= Five & Two Pictures =

Christian Film Production Company

- Type: Filmmaking
- Genre: Christian film
- Founded: 2002
- Founder: Dave Christiano; Rich Christiano
- Headquarters: United States
- Website: Official website

Five & Two Pictures is an independent Christian film production company founded in 2002 by Dave Christiano and Rich Christiano. They have produced several Christian feature films; Time Changer, Unidentified, Me & You, Us, Forever, The Secrets of Jonathan Sperry, Amazing Love, Play the Flute and A Matter of Faith.

== History ==
Five & Two Pictures was founded by Dave Christiano and Rich Christiano in 2002 with their first theatrical release, Time Changer. The time travel movie opened on October 25, 2002 in 169 theaters and eventually played in 310. On April 28, 2006, Five and Two Pictures released their second film, a drama about UFOs entitled, Unidentified. This was a smaller platform release, opening in 6 theaters and eventually playing in 85.

On February 15, 2008, Five & Two Pictures released film number three, a love story, Me & You, Us, Forever in 83 theaters. Their fourth film, The Secrets of Jonathan Sperry, is a period piece set in 1970. It opened in 118 theaters on September 18, 2009 and ended up playing in 313.

== List of films ==
Year	Title	Budget	Box office
2002	Time Changer	$825,000	$1,305,964
2006	Unidentified	$400,000	$224,099
2008	Me & You, Us, Forever		$84,093
2009	The Secrets of Jonathan Sperry	$1,000,000	$1,048,655
2012	Amazing Love: The Story of Hosea	$1,000,000	
2014	A Matter of Faith		$669,557
2016	Remember the Goal		
2018	Power of the Air		
2018	Play the Flute		
2019	The Perfect Race		
2022	MindReader		
2023	Always a Winner		
2025	Take Time to Dance		
