= Pilgrim's Progress: Journey to Heaven =

- Directed by: Danny Carrales
- Written by: John Bunyan (novel); Danny Carrales (screenwriter)
- Cinematography: James Burgess
- Edited by: James Burgess
- Production company: DRC Films
- Release date: 2008
- Country: United States
- Language: English

Pilgrim's Progress: Journey to Heaven (or simply Pilgrim's Progress) is a 2008 Christian film based on John Bunyan’s classic 1678 novel The Pilgrim's Progress. It was written and directed by Danny Carrales, and starred Daniel Kruse as Christian. The film was featured at the Merrimack Valley Christian Film Festival.

== Plot ==
Set in the modern day, the main character in the film, Christian (Daniel Kruse) is concerned about the well-being of his family after reading the Bible which says that the city will be destroyed by fire. It becomes a burden for him, but his family and friends reject the warnings in the Bible. He begins his journey to The Celestial City where he has been told that he will find safety from the coming destruction and relief from his burden.

== Cast ==
- Daniel Kruse as Christian
- Terry Jernigan as Faithful and Apollyon (voice)
- Jeremiah Guelzo as Hopeful
- Hugh McLean as Evangelist
- Reid Dalton as Giant Despair
- Neal Brasher as Envy
