= Unidentified (2006 film) =

- Directed by: Rich Christiano
- Written by: Rich Christiano
- Produced by: Rich Christiano; Alvin Mount
- Starring: Jonathan Aube; Josh Adamson; Michael Blain-Rozgay; Jenna Bailey
- Cinematography: Jasper Randall
- Edited by: Jeffrey Lee Hollis
- Distributed by: Five & Two Pictures; Cornerstone Television
- Release date: March 24, 2006
- Running time: 85 minutes
- Country: United States
- Language: English
- Budget: $400,000
- Box office: $224,099

Unidentified is a 2006 science fiction Christian film produced by Rich Christiano and Alvin Mount. It was written and directed by Rich Christiano and stars Jonathan Aube, Josh Adamson, Michael Blain-Rozgay, Jenna Bailey, Lance Zitron, and the popular Christian pop rock musician Rebecca St. James. The film deals with UFOs and how they could play into the end times.

== Production and release ==
In May 2005, Rich Christiano wrote, co-produced, and directed the film, his second feature-length movie. Dave Christiano served as story consultant. It was released in theaters in April 2006 under Five & Two Pictures. It was rated PG for thematic elements.

== Main cast ==
- Jonathan Aube – Keith
- Josh Adamson – Brad
- Michael Blain-Rozgay – Darren
- Jenna Bailey – Lauren
- Lance Zitron – Vince
- Rebecca St. James – Colleen

== Reception ==
Reviews were negative. Joe Leyden of Variety wrote "It's not quite awful enough to qualify as camp, which may work against its finding any audience", and credited it with actors with "more sincerity than talent", but a script which "buries its one good idea". Philip Martin of the Arkansas Democrat-Gazette wrote, "...the cinematic equivalent of a Jack Chick cartoon tract, a modestly artful form of proselytizing," but "one hopes the people who enjoy this sort of thing will find it."
