= Jansen Panettiere =

American actor (1994–2023)

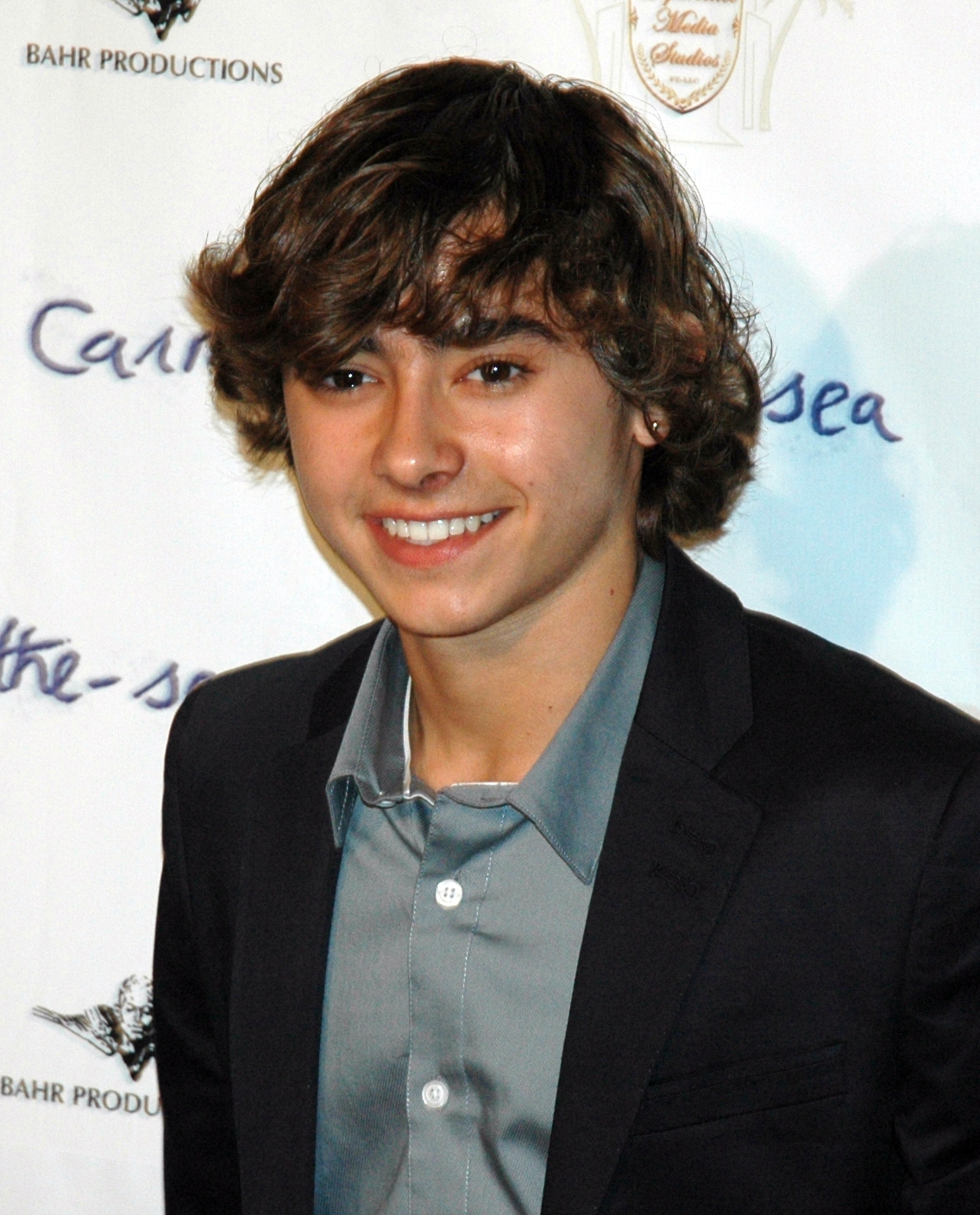
- Panettiere in 2011
- Born: Jansen Rane Panettiere; September 25, 1994; Palisades, New York, U.S.
- Died: February 19, 2023 (aged 28); Nyack, New York, U.S.
- Occupation: Actor
- Years active: 2002–2023
- Relatives: Hayden Panettiere (sister)

Jansen Rane Panettiere (/ˌpænətiˈɛər/ PAN-ə-tee-AIR; September 25, 1994 – February 19, 2023) was an American actor, known for his roles in films The Secrets of Jonathan Sperry, The Perfect Game, The Martial Arts Kid, and How High 2. He had also provided the voice roles of Periwinkle in the sixth and final season of the Nick Jr. children's live-action/animated TV series Blue's Clues, young Stripes in Racing Stripes, young Rodney Copperbottom in Robots, Truman X in the Nickelodeon animated TV series The X's, and Shovelmouth Boy in Ice Age: The Meltdown.

== Early life ==
Panettiere was born on September 25, 1994, in Palisades, New York, to Lesley R. Vogel, a former soap opera actress, and Alan Lee "Skip" Panettiere, a fire department lieutenant. He was the younger brother of actress and singer Hayden Panettiere.

== Career ==
Panettiere had a supporting role in the Disney Channel Original Movie Tiger Cruise, which starred his sister Hayden. This was one of two productions featuring both siblings onscreen, the other being The Forger. Panettiere voiced Periwinkle in the Nick Jr. show Blue's Clues for its sixth and final season, replacing Kenny Kim. He lent his voice to Racing Stripes. He portrayed the voice of Truman X in The X's. He starred as Luke Malloy in the made-for-television Nickelodeon film The Last Day of Summer, airing on July 20, 2007. It was released on DVD on August 28, 2007.

His next film, The Perfect Game, was going to be released in theaters on August 8, 2008, but Lionsgate Films decided to push it back to the spring of 2010. The Perfect Game is directed by William Dear, based on the true story of how a group of boys from Monterrey, Mexico became the first non-U.S. team to win the Little League World Series. Panettiere also co-starred with Gavin MacLeod in The Secrets of Jonathan Sperry, a film directed by Rich Christiano about faith and friendship. He appeared with Martin Sheen, Jamie Lee Curtis, and Christine Lahti, as Elliott Perry in Dustin Lance Black's play 8, a reenactment of the Perry v. Schwarzenegger trial, at the Wilshire Ebell Theatre on March 3, 2012. The performance was broadcast on YouTube to raise money for the American Foundation for Equal Rights. In 2019, Panettiere guest starred in the AMC network series The Walking Dead and co-starred in MTV's How High 2.

== Death ==
Panettiere died of aortic valve complications arising from cardiomegaly in Nyack, New York, on February 19, 2023, at age 28.

== Filmography ==
Television and film roles
Year	Film	Role	Notes
2002	Even Stevens	Kupchack's Son	Episode: "The Big Splash"
2003	Hope & Faith	Justin Shanowski	Episode: "Pilot"
2003	Third Watch	Billy	Episode: "Payback"
2004	Tiger Cruise	Joey Coleman	Television film
2004	Blue's Clues	Periwinkle	Voice role; Season 6
2005–2006	Holly Hobbie and Friends: Surprise Party	Robby Hobbie	Voice role; TV special
2005–2006	Racing Stripes	Young Stripes	Voice role
2005–2006	Robots	Young Rodney Copperbottom	Voice role
2005–2006	The X's	Truman X	Voice role
2006	Ice Age: The Meltdown	Shovelmouth Boy	Voice role
2006	Holly Hobbie and Friends: Christmas Wishes	Robby Hobbie	Voice role
2006	Everybody Hates Chris	Peter	Episode: "Everybody Hates Kris"
2007	Holly Hobbie and Friends: Secret Adventures	Robby Hobbie	Voice role
2007	The Last Day of Summer	Luke Malloy	Television film
2007	The Babysitters	Mikey Beltran	
2007	Holly Hobbie and Friends: Best Friends Forever	Robby Hobbie	Voice role
2009	The Secrets of Jonathan Sperry	Dustin	
2010	The Perfect Game	Enrique	
2011	The Lost Medallion: The Adventures of Billy Stone	Huko	
2012	The Forger	Aram	
2013	Shadow on the Mesa	Young Boy	
2015	Summer Forever	Broom	
2015	The Martial Arts Kid	Robbie Oakes	
2019	How High 2	Hayes	
2019	The Walking Dead	Casper	Episode: "The Calm Before"
2022	Love and Love Not	Robin	
2025	Bart Bagalzby and the Garbage Genie	Fizz	Posthumous release
TBA	Aaah! Roach!	Martin Jones	Posthumous release
TBA	American Game		Posthumous release
TBA	Horse	Isaac	Posthumous release
TBA	Justice Angel	Allen	Posthumous release
