= List of Christian film production companies =

This is a partial list of notable production companies that are focused on the Christian film genre.

== Companies ==
=== A ===
- Advent Film Group
- Affirm Films
- Angel Studios

=== B ===
- Believe Pictures

=== C ===
- ChristianCinema.com
- Cloud Ten Pictures
- CMD Distribution
- Crystal Creek Media

=== D ===
- Dallas Jenkins

=== E ===
- Elevating Entertainment Motion Pictures
- Erwin Brothers
- Eternal Pictures

=== F ===
- Faith Films
- Five & Two Pictures
- Fox Faith

=== G ===
- Gateway Films/Vision Video
- Gener8Xion Entertainment

=== J ===
- Jeremiah Films

=== K ===
- Kendrick Brothers
- Kingdom Story Company

=== L ===
- Lightworkers Media
- Limelight Department

=== P ===
- Paulist Productions
- Pinnacle Peak Pictures
- PorchLight Entertainment
- Protestant Film Commission
- Provident Films

=== S ===
- Sherwood Pictures

=== U ===
- Uplifting Entertainment

=== V ===
- VidAngel

=== W ===
- Wonder Project

== See also ==
- List of Christian films
- List of film production companies
