= Time Changer =

2002 film by Rich Christiano

- Theatrical poster
- Directed by: Rich Christiano
- Written by: Rich Christiano
- Produced by: Rich Christiano; Kevin Downes
- Starring: D. David Morin; Gavin MacLeod; Hal Linden; Richard Riehle; Jennifer O'Neill; Paul Rodriguez
- Cinematography: Philip Hurn
- Edited by: Jeffrey Lee Hollis
- Music by: Jasper Randall
- Distributed by: Five & Two Pictures
- Release date: October 25, 2002
- Running time: 95 minutes
- Country: United States
- Language: English
- Budget: $825,000
- Box office: $1.3 million

Time Changer is a 2002 independent Christian science fiction seriocomic film written and directed by Rich Christiano, released by Five & Two Pictures. The screenplay concerns Dr. Norris Anderson (Gavin MacLeod), who uses his late father's time machine to send his colleague, Bible professor Russell Carlisle (D. David Morin), from 1890 into the early 21st century. The film had a limited nationwide release.

== Plot ==
In October 1890, Bible professor Russell Carlisle (D. David Morin) stops and scolds a boy named Roger for stealing his neighbor's marbles. He makes the boy return the marbles, and demands he apologize for his unjust action, only for Roger to run away.

Carlisle has also written a book manuscript promoting themes of bringing forth Christ's teachings apart from His name. The book is on track to receive a unanimous endorsement from the board of Grace Bible Seminary, until colleague Dr. Norris Anderson (Gavin MacLeod) objects, arguing that teaching morality without Jesus as the standard would be detrimental to future generations. The Dean puts the vote on hold until Anderson and Carlisle work out their differences.

Anderson invites Carlisle to his home later that evening to show him something that would prove his point. Carlisle turns him down and urges the Dean to proceed with the endorsement without Anderson's vote. However, the Dean firms that the vote must be unanimous. Carlisle finally meets with Norris the next night, where Norris shows him a top-secret invention: a time machine invented by his late father. Refusing to believe time travel is possible, Carlisle laughs Norris off as crazy before leaving. However, Carlisle relents and returns to Norris the next night after deciding their differences must be resolved.

Anderson prepares to send Carlisle 100 years into the future. Sending him on a Saturday afternoon, he instructs Carlisle that he has until Wednesday night and must return to the exact location where he was sent. He further instructs Carlisle not to tell anyone where he is from, nor is he to learn of his own fate. However, Anderson does urge him to find a Christian librarian named Michelle Bain, who helped Norris when he himself traveled to the future.

Arriving in the late 20th century, Carlisle, although fascinated by society's advancements, is shocked at its moral decay: half of all marriages end in divorce, teenagers talk openly about underage drinking, children are disrespectful to their parents and treat moral sins, such as theft, as fun and games. Immodest apparel are openly sold in retail stores, movies and TV shows contain blasphemous language and inappropriate content. Jesus and the Bible are now banned from public education, and many professing Christians in the church do not really follow Jesus.

Carlisle finds Bain (Jennifer O'Neill), and with her assistance, he learns that society decided to remove the Biblical foundations the country was built on in the 1960s, after deciding that morality was good enough on its own. Finally realizing the error of his ways, Russel begs God for forgiveness. Meanwhile, two churchgoing police investigators grow suspicious of Carlisle, after learning many inconsistencies about himself, such as his identity and his work. They arrange to have Carlisle guest speak at an evening church service, hoping to expose himself.

At the service, Carlisle gives a heartfelt expression of his shock and grief at how wicked the generation has become, even in the church. He reminds everyone that the faith is nothing to take lightly, and that the eternal state of their souls is in jeopardy if they don't truly commit to Christ. The cops tail Carlisle as he goes back to the alley to be taken back to the past, where they confront him. Carlisle tells them he's a messenger from God, and that the second coming of Christ is near. As they prepare to apprehend him, the sky grows thunderous, and Carlisle vanishes.

Carlisle tells Anderson that seeing the corruption of the future has forced him to see his mistake, and revises his book. Carlisle finds Roger sometime later and gives him his own set of marbles, telling him that it is Jesus who says theft is wrong. Anderson tries to find out the world's end by trying to send a large Bible to the future date of October 22, 2100, only to discover the machine won't operate to it. He makes adjustments by a decade, leading to more failed outcomes. The film closes as he lowers down to 2050 to still no avail.

== Cast ==
- D. David Morin as Russell Carlisle
- Gavin MacLeod as Norris Anderson
- Hal Linden as The Dean
- Jennifer O'Neill as Michelle Bain
- Paul Rodriguez as Eddie Martinez
- Richard Riehle as Dr. Wiseman
- John Valdetero as Tom Sharp
- Dan Campbell as Rex
- Evan Ellingson as Roger
- Crystal Robbins as Mrs. Matthews
- Patty MacLeod as Norris' Wife
- Paul Napier as Dr. Butler
- Charles Hutchins as Dr. Henry
- Callan White as Carlisle's Wife
- Ross McKerras as Pawn Shop Guy
- Ruben Madera as Bellhop
- Mike Wilson as Sam
- Arthur Roberts as Man In Pew
- Rod Britt as Pastor
- Ron Sey as Hot Dog Vendor
- Emily Trapp as Young Girl
- Brad Heller as Boutique Manager
- Alexander Polk as Security Guard
- Teresa Vidak as Waitress
- Paige Peterson as Girl In Booth
- Alana Curry as Girl In Booth
- Nan McNamara as Tom's Wife
- Cassie LaRocca as Rex's Wife
- Alfred Jackson as Student
- Michael Gier as Group Leader
- Chipper Lowell as Visitation Guy (as Chip Lowell)
- Linda Kerns as Lady Prospect
- William Bowerman as William
- Michelle Dunker as Secretary
- Kevin Downes as Greg

== Production ==
Time Changer was Rich Christiano's first feature-length film. In August 2001 Christiano Film Group announced the film's cast, and that shooting would begin on October 6, 2001 in Visalia, CA, for an August 2, 2002 release. In February 2002, the website stated that the film was being edited in Los Angeles. In March, the first rough cut was completed, work began on a second pass, and streaming video was made available. In a press release, the theatrical release date was listed as October 4, 2002. Editing wrapped in June, while music score, sound design, and visual effects work continued, and two scene sneak previews were linked on the website. On August 2, the trailer was released online. On August 6 the press release changed to show a theatrical release date of October 11. On October 4, 2002, the film was announced as "ready to go", with a theatrical poster available which showed the final release date of October 25, as did the simultaneous press release.

== Releases ==
The film premiered in limited nationwide release on October 25, 2002. It was released on VHS and DVD in 2003; The DVD included a "making of" featurette, commentary tracks, deleted scenes, promos and the trailer. Time Changer was one of the first Christiano films offered through the Sky Angel Video On Demand service.

A 140-page tie-in novel, Time Changer (A Novel), was released in 2001, co-authored by Christiano and Greg Mitchell.

== Reception ==
In the Charlotte Observer, Lawrence Toppman praised the acting work, but had questions about plot holes and how some of the film's premises would be accepted by Christian viewers. Toppman wrote, "technically, the film can stand with most releases", and gave it 2.5 stars out of four. Variety reviewer Scott Foundas described the film as "goofy fantasy hokum" with a message, one scene as "subpar", and some monologues as "distinctly uncinematic", but other scenes as "surprisingly enjoyable." Foundas found the film "hard to read" – often having "its tongue planted firmly in its cheek", but at other times "sweetly naive". Joe Baltake of The Sacramento Bee gave 1.5 stars (of 4) to the "whimsical if predictable" film "marred by a willful single-mindedness." He found the film's beginning "interminable", and overall, "very strange".

As of 18 July 2009, the film holds a 22% approval rating on Rotten Tomatoes with 2 out of 9 critics giving it a positive review with an average rating of 3.9/10; audience reviews, however, give the movie a rating of 87%.
