= Parables TV =

American religious streaming media service

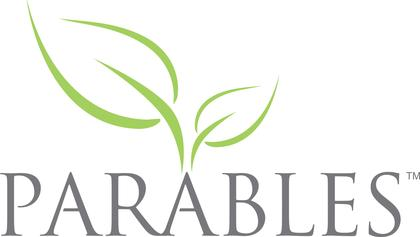
- Type: Internet Christian TV Network
- Country: United States
- Availability: Worldwide
- Owner: Olympusat
- Launch date: June 2009
- Official website: parablestv.com

Parables TV is a global subscription-based provider of streaming Christian and other faith-based movies and TV series. Parables TV is owned by Olympusat. Parables TV features a library of subscription video on demand (SVOD) movies, documentaries, children’s programming, original productions and TV series, as well as a streaming linear TV channel which has a daily schedule. Parables TV was established June 2009 in Florida. The CEO of Parables TV is Bob Higley, who also sits on the board of the organization Christians in Media. Vice president of programming is Issac Hernandez, who also serves on the Film Standing Committee with National Religious Broadcasters (NRB).

== Business model ==
Parables TV primarily operates through three distribution channels:

- Subscription video on demand service on its website and mobile devices similar to Netflix.
- Subscription streaming 24-hour-per-day linear TV channel viewable on its website and mobile devices.
- Program syndicator for other religious TV networks. (Parables TV offers a syndicated “movie of the week” that airs on other Christian TV networks)

Parables TV has entered the online TV market with a video on demand library that includes hundreds of Christian movies, documentaries and TV series not available on many cable and satellite TV channels, including international Christian TV networks. Parable's marketing has also aligned with many churches of various denominations. In exchange, Parables TV sponsors church events using media avenues such as local radio, and provides free screenings of new movies. Expansion plans include creating original Christian movies and original scripted TV series; distribution to other “TV everywhere” platforms like Truli TV, including smart televisions and gaming devices; syndication with other faith networks; and strategic partnerships with filmmakers. According to MediaPost Communications, online TV viewing is up 246%, and within five years streaming video on demand will pass regular TV in the number of viewers. Parables is promoted on YouTube, and GodTube with endorsements from celebrities like Robert Duvall, Diane Lane, John Schneider, Leonard Maltin, Morgan Freeman and Alex Kendrick. According to Business Insider, Christian themed movies have been so profitable that Hollywood continues to target a religious demographic in theaters with films such as The Bible (miniseries), Noah (2014 film), God's Not Dead, Transcendence, Heaven is for Real and The Passion of the Christ.

== Parent company ==
Olympusat Holdings is the parent company of Parables TV. Parables TV and the Faith Broadcasting Network are the Christian networks in Olympusat's Faith and Family suite. Olympusat is an independent television network operator, providing master control, satellite/uplink, affiliate sales, administrative, and on-demand and multi platform transcoding expertise, distribution, production and technical services to the cable, satellite, and telecommunications industries. Olympusat owns and operates 70 TV networks, including 35 new high-definition networks targeting U.S. Hispanics with Spanish-language programming from Latin America, including Mexico, Venezuela, Chile, Honduras, and Puerto Rico. Networks include Hispanic TV network Cine Mexicano, the Toku Channel and Ultra HD Plex. Parables TV and Upliftv are Olympusat’s two faith channels that provide faith and family programming for its cable and satellite affiliates as well as online subscribers.

== Syndication and distribution ==
In 2011 Parables TV entered a syndication agreement with Daystar Television Network which features a weekly faith based family friendly movie on Daystar’s network. Syndication partnerships include Uplift TV, Faith Broadcasting Network (formerly TBN Africa), TCT Network, God TV, NRB Network (National Religious Broadcasters Network) and Christian Television Network. Parables is also a Distributor of media content, and works directly with film producers and writers to distribute their film projects.

== Technology platforms ==
In February 2013, Parables TV introduced its 24/7 Internet linear streaming television network. Linear TV differs from Video on Demand because it offers scheduled TV programs. Parables TV can also be viewed on Apple’s iPhones, iPads and Apple TV.

An Android app was released featuring both on demand and streaming TV. Parables TV created an app for the popular Roku box that allows viewers to watch Parables TV on their large screen televisions in their homes.

In December 2013, Parables introduced subscription video on demand (SVOD). Hundreds of hours of Christian movies were added to the video on demand library of the Parables streaming TV service and made available to all devices including the Roku Channel, Apple and Android mobile devices and Apple TV.

== Programming ==
Parables TV offers on-demand Christian movies such as Left Behind, The Finger of God, The Resurrection and many others. Parables also carries weekly series, and scheduled daily shows on their linear TV schedule. Parables also publishes movie reviews which contain interviews with the lead actors on faith-based and/or family-friendly films such as Concussion, starring Will Smith, The Revenant, starring David Anders and Chris Wylde, Star Wars: The Force Awakens, starring Harrison Ford, Mark Hamill, and Carrie Fisher, Another Perfect Stranger starring Jefferson Moore, and C Me Dance, produced by Uplifting Entertainment.
