= A Matter of Faith =

- Theatrical poster
- Directed by: Rich Christiano
- Written by: Rich Christiano; Dave Christiano
- Produced by: Rich Christiano; Laura Burnell
- Starring: Jordan Trovillion; Jay Pickett; Chandler Macocha; Barrett Carnahan; Clarence Gilyard; Harry Anderson
- Cinematography: Phillip Hurn
- Edited by: Dave Christiano
- Music by: Jasper Randall
- Distributed by: Five & Two Pictures
- Release date: October 17, 2014
- Running time: 88 minutes
- Country: United States
- Language: English
- Budget: $600,000
- Box office: $677,577

A Matter of Faith is a 2014 American Christian drama film directed by Rich Christiano and starring Harry Anderson (in his final role), Jordan Trovillion, Jay Pickett, and Clarence Gilyard. The film was shot in the summer of 2013 in Michigan, and was released into theaters on October 17, 2014, by Five & Two Pictures. The fictional story follows a Christian student (played by Trovillion) and her father (Pickett) who are challenged by a biology professor (Anderson) who teaches evolution.

== Plot ==
In 2013 Michigan, Rachel Whitaker, who was raised in an evangelical Christian household, prepares to leave for college. At school, her atheist biology professor, Dr. Kaman, teaches evolutionary theory. Rachel encounters ideas that conflict with her religious upbringing and begins to question aspects of her faith.

Rachel's father, Stephen, becomes concerned about the changes in her beliefs and confronts Dr. Kaman, who challenges him to a public debate on religion, to Rachel's discomfort. While preparing, Stephen is approached by Evan, a student who directs him to Portland, a former biology professor who was dismissed years earlier after teaching creationism and disputing evolutionary theory. Portland initially refuses to assist and asks Stephen to leave.

While studying in the campus library, Rachel is approached by another student who criticizes Stephen for attempting to challenge evolutionary theory. Evan arrives, confronts the student, and argues that evolution is impossible, claiming that humans did not descend from earlier primates and instead originate from Adam and Eve. The student leaves. Rachel becomes upset with Evan, saying that he embarrassed her. Evan responds that he was defending Jesus, God, and Christianity rather than Rachel personally.

Evan overhears two students discussing Rachel and learns that Tyler, who has recently begun dating her, intends to invite her to a party and take advantage of her. Evan attempts to warn Rachel, but she refuses to speak with him. He goes to her dorm and confronts her, accusing her of abandoning her faith and being influenced by others. Rachel leaves angrily. Evan calls after her, claiming that Tyler is manipulating her and is only interested in her for sexual reasons. Disturbed by what she hears, Rachel thanks Evan for telling her and later ends her relationship with Tyler.

During the debate, Dr. Kaman presents arguments against creationism, religion, and belief in an afterlife. As he prepares to conclude, Portland interrupts and challenges Kaman’s claims, asserting his belief that life cannot arise from non-life, that the Bible is divinely inspired, that evolution is unproven, and that the Earth is far younger than mainstream science holds. Portland admits that he resented Kaman for years after losing his job but now considers that reaction misguided. He argues that biology classes should present both evolution and creationism and allow students to choose what to believe. Portland asks Kaman for forgiveness and attempts to persuade him toward Christianity. Kaman concedes the debate, and the audience applauds.

Evan later asks Rachel to be his girlfriend, and she agrees. He takes her to a nature preserve that he says is meaningful to him and explains that he once stole a coin from a girl there, regretted it, and subsequently became a Christian. Evan reveals that the girl was Rachel, a fact he learned from speaking with Stephen. Rachel accepts his apology, and the two embrace.

== Cast ==
- Harry Anderson as Professor Marcus Kaman
- Jordan Trovillion as Rachel Whitaker
- Jay Pickett as Stephen Whitaker
- Clarence Gilyard as Professor Joseph Portland
- Chandler Macocha as Evan Carlson
- Justin Brandt as Jason
- Barrett Carnahan as Tyler Mathis
- Stephanie Shemanski as Ally
- Sarab Kamoo as Kimberly Whitaker
- Scott Alan Smith as Phil Jamison

== Reception ==
A Matter of Faith was initially released to 25 movie theaters and its widest release was to 52 theaters.

Common Sense Media gave the film a one out of five rating, criticizing its "clear agenda" and "clichéd plotting".

The Young Earth creationist and Christian apologetics organization Answers in Genesis (AiG) promoted the film.

The Dove Foundation gave the film a rating of five out of five dove seals, writing that "This quality movie features solid acting including two veterans, Harry Anderson and Clarence Gilyard."
