= List of Pastor Greg episodes =

The following is a list of Pastor Greg episodes.

== Episodes ==
=== Specials ===
No.	Title	Original release date
N–A	"Pilot"	N/A
N–A	"Pastor Greg's First Christmas"	N/A

=== Season 1 ===
No.	Title	Original release date
1	"Impressions"	October 13, 2005
2	"Friendship"	October 20, 2005
3	"Stress (Part 1)"	October 27, 2005
4	"Patience (Part 2)"	November 1, 2005
5	"Faith"	November 8, 2005
6	"Fear"	November 15, 2005
7	"Service"	November 22, 2005
8	"Commitment"	November 29, 2005
9	"Jealousy"	December 8, 2005
10	"Risk"	December 15, 2005
11	"Hope"	December 22, 2005
12	"Confusion"	December 29, 2005
13	"Temptation"	January 5, 2006
14	"Anger"	February 9, 2006
15	"Responsibility"	February 16, 2006
16	"Spooky"	January 19, 2006
17	"Shame"	January 26, 2006
18	"Love"	January 12, 2006

=== Season 2 ===
No.	Title	Original release date
19	"Trust"	February 3, 2007
20	"Rejection"	TBA
21	"Priorities"	TBA
22	"Shock"	TBA
23	"Sanity"	TBA
24	"Marriage"	TBA
25	"Forgiveness"	TBA
26	"Peace"	TBA
27	"Visiting Merline Church"	TBA
28	"Lost"	TBA
29	"Obedience"	TBA
30	"Relaxation"	TBA
31	"Unexpected"	TBA

=== Season 3 ===
No.	Title	Original release date
32	"Time"	February 1, 2008
33	"Agape"	February 8, 2008
34	"Opportunities"	February 15, 2008
35	"Misguided"	February 22, 2008
36	"Stewardship"	February 29, 2008
37	"Chances"	March 7, 2008
38	"Ethics"	March 14, 2008
39	"Criticism"	March 21, 2008
40	"Series Finale"	May 30, 2008
