= Me & You, Us, Forever =

- Directed by: Dave Christiano
- Written by: Dave Christiano
- Produced by: Dave Christiano
- Starring: Michael Blain-Rozgay; Stacey J. Aswad; Hugh McLean; Jenna Bailey; Karla Droege; Terry Loughlin; Sandi Fix; Kathryn Worsham
- Cinematography: Philip Hurn
- Edited by: Shane McMullin; Dave Christiano
- Music by: Jasper Randall Titman
- Production company: Dave Christiano Films
- Distributed by: Five & Two Pictures
- Release date: February 15, 2008
- Running time: 104 minutes
- Country: United States
- Language: English
- Box office: $84,093

Me & You, Us, Forever is a 2008 Christian film written, directed, produced and co-edited by Dave Christiano, and upon whose personal experience of divorce it is based. The film was distributed by Five & Two Pictures, and starred Michael Blain-Rozgay, Stacey J. Aswad, Hugh McLean, Jenna Bailey, Sandi Fix, Kathryn Worsham and character actor Terry Loughlin.

== Plot ==
A 47-year-old Christian man (Michael Blain-Rozgay) is on the other side of an unwanted divorce. Searching for answers to ease the pain and make sense of his life, he meets a woman (Stacey J. Aswad) at a divorce recovery group. The two forge a friendship and find they have a common bond: both have been thinking about their lost first loves. As he reminisces about his old high school girlfriend (Kathryn Worsham), he regrets he ever broke up with her. Now, 30 years later, he wants to see her again.

== Cast ==
- Michael Blain-Rozgay as Dave
- Stacey J. Aswad as Carla
- Hugh McLean as Paul
- Jenna Bailey as Sue
- Sandi Fix as Mary
- Kathryn Worsham as a young Mary
- Terry Loughlin as support group leader

== Production ==
According to Christiano, the idea for the film occurred years before his marriage, and he began writing it in about 2002, basing it on his own "first love" teen romance in New York. He stated that he wrote it with the intention of helping Christians through difficult times, and getting past anger and bitterness. He said that church leaders should reach out to members in crisis. Jasper Randall composed the music for the film.

== Release ==
Me & You, Us, Forever's initial theatrical release was set for 83 cities in 34 states on February 15, 2008, following Valentine's Day. A second release to additional cities was planned for May 9, 2008. The film was released to digital-projection cinemas, and was marketed "direct-to-churches", which one reverend remarked upon as "relatively new." The film made $58,662 on its opening weekend, and $84,093 total.

== Reception ==
Ken Hanke of the Mountain Xpress described the technical aspects of the film as "competent", but action locations as "blandest, least interesting settings imaginable". He continued, "I don’t know when I’ve ever seen a less interesting or more dramatically neutered movie," commenting specifically on many overlong simple action sequences which could have been easily trimmed. In a roundup of the best and worst films of 2008, Andrew Jefchak of the Grand Rapids Press labeled the film the "Worst inspirational feature ... which takes an important message about life and turns it into boring drivel through simplistic dialogue, terrible acting and unimaginative direction."
