= C. O. Baptista =

Early Christian filmmaker and animator

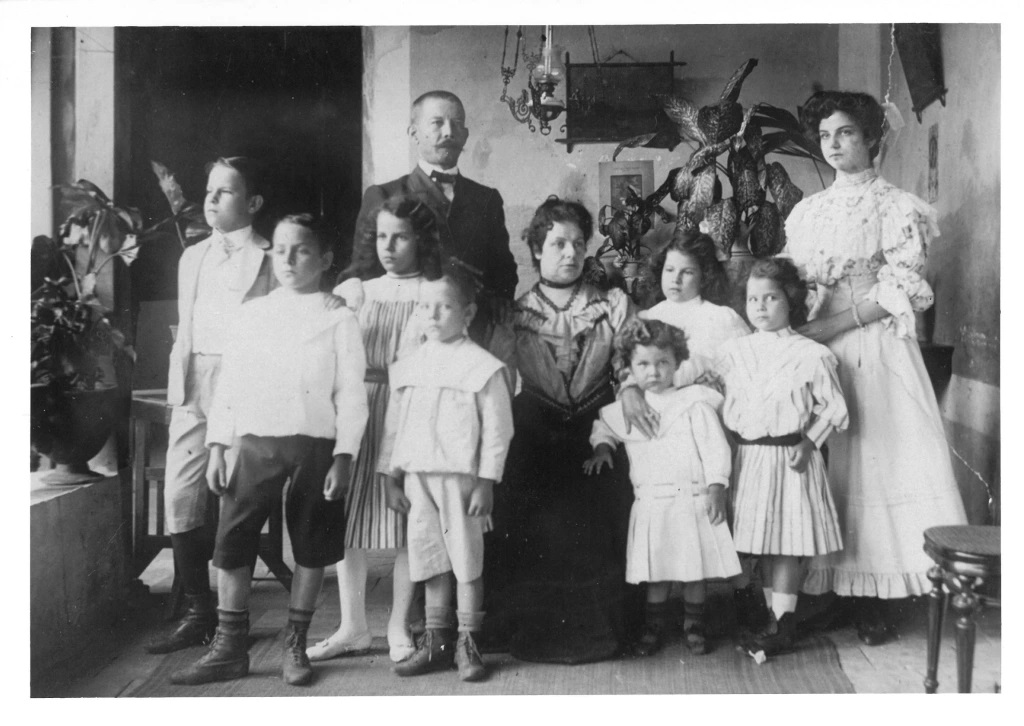
- Baptista Family in Venezuela, 1908, with Carlos on far left
- Born: Carlos Octavio Baptista; September 25, 1894; San Cristóbal, Venezuela
- Died: February 9, 1965 (aged 70); Wheaton, Illinois
- Resting place: Elm Lawn Memorial Park Elmhurst, Illinois
- Citizenship: Venezuela (1894 - 1919) United States (1919–1965)
- Occupation: Filmmaker
- Years active: 1936-1964
- Known for: Pioneer in Christian cinema and animation
- Notable work: The Story of a Fountain Pen (1939) Pilgrim's Progress (1950)
- Spouse: Virginia Mullins (m. 1921)
- Children: 1

C. O. Baptista (1894–1965) was an early American Christian filmmaker. Between 1939 and 1958, he produced over 100 educational and evangelistic live action and animated films. He and the production company he founded are recognized as important pioneers in the history of Christian cinema.

== Life ==
Carlos (or Charles) Octavio Baptista was born in 1894 in San Cristóbal, Táchira, in Venezuela, the son of a Venezuelan lawyer and diplomat. In 1909, he immigrated to the United States while a high school student. He settled in Chicago and became a naturalized U.S. citizen in 1919. His first job was as a salesman for the Kimball Piano Company, selling pianos to the domestic and Latin American market. It took three months for him to sell his first piano. Of his early years in Chicago, Baptista would later recall, "It is a strange feeling to find yourself alone and friendless in a big city." During World War I, he served in the as a correspondent in the U.S. Army National Guard 131st Infantry Regiment, attaining the rank of First Sergeant.

The turning point in his life came when a stranger gave him a copy of the Gospel of John. Moved by John's Gospel, Baptista dedicated his life to spreading the Good News of salvation in Christ. Shortly after his conversion to Christ, Baptista took another job in sales, this time selling movie projection equipment to Latin American countries. To increase sales of 16mm movie projectors, Baptista began transferring English language films into Spanish. This would prove to be Baptista's entry into the technical side of filmmaking. The inspiration for Baptista's first film came in the course of teaching Sunday school in 1939: "It became my habit to give an object lesson to the children during the opening exercises. One of these was called Story of a Fountain Pen, paralleling a Christian life to a fountain pen that is "redeemed" from a pawn shop for a purpose. The object lesson was so well received in Sunday school that it occurred to me to put it on film." In 1942, Baptista founded a film production company, known variously as "C. O. Baptista Films," "Scriptures Visualized Institute," and ultimately, "Baptista Film Mission."

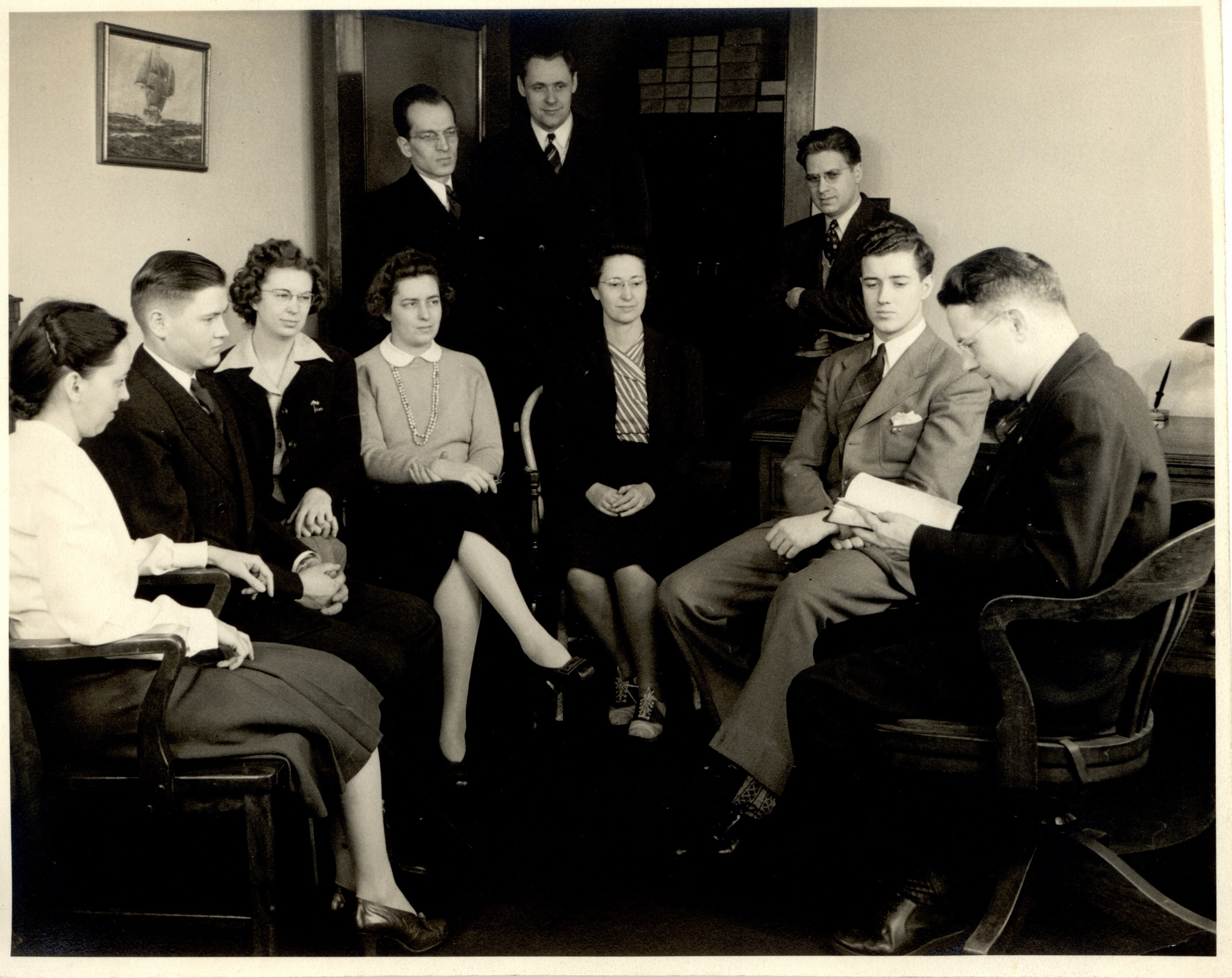
C. O. Baptista leads staff devotions at Baptista Film Mission offices, 1943. Courtesy of Wheaton College Archives & Special Collections.

Along with a prolific output of films, Baptista's company also manufactured two innovative projection devices. The more important of these was the "Miracle Projector," introduced in 1944. Weighing only twenty-five pounds, the Miracle was sixty pounds lighter than typical 16mm projectors of its day, a significant improvement in portability. The name for the projector, however, came not from its light weight, but in the guarantee that came with every model: "We unconditionally guarantee the Miracle Projector...against any defects whatsoever in the quality of its materials or workmanship, from the date it is purchased until the return of the Lord Jesus Christ." In 1950, the company released a synchronized filmstrip projector called Tell-N-See to be used in religious education classes and began adapting many of its films to filmstrip format. Baptista had a strong entrepreneurial spirit and was even a visionary about the potential future for film distribution, predicting a time when a film projector would be part of the equipment of every church, Sunday School, Bible camp, and Christian home. Ironically, Baptista, for whom the Word and evangelistic message were paramount, never appreciated filmmaking as an artistic endeavor. Many of his films were amateurish in production, consisting mostly of preaching and commentary, rather than dramatic dialogue. Baptista's insistence on absolute fidelity to the Scriptural message in his films (he required that everyone involved in his productions be committed Christians) and lack of concern for professional quality caused his films gradually to lose favor with church audiences.

== Films ==
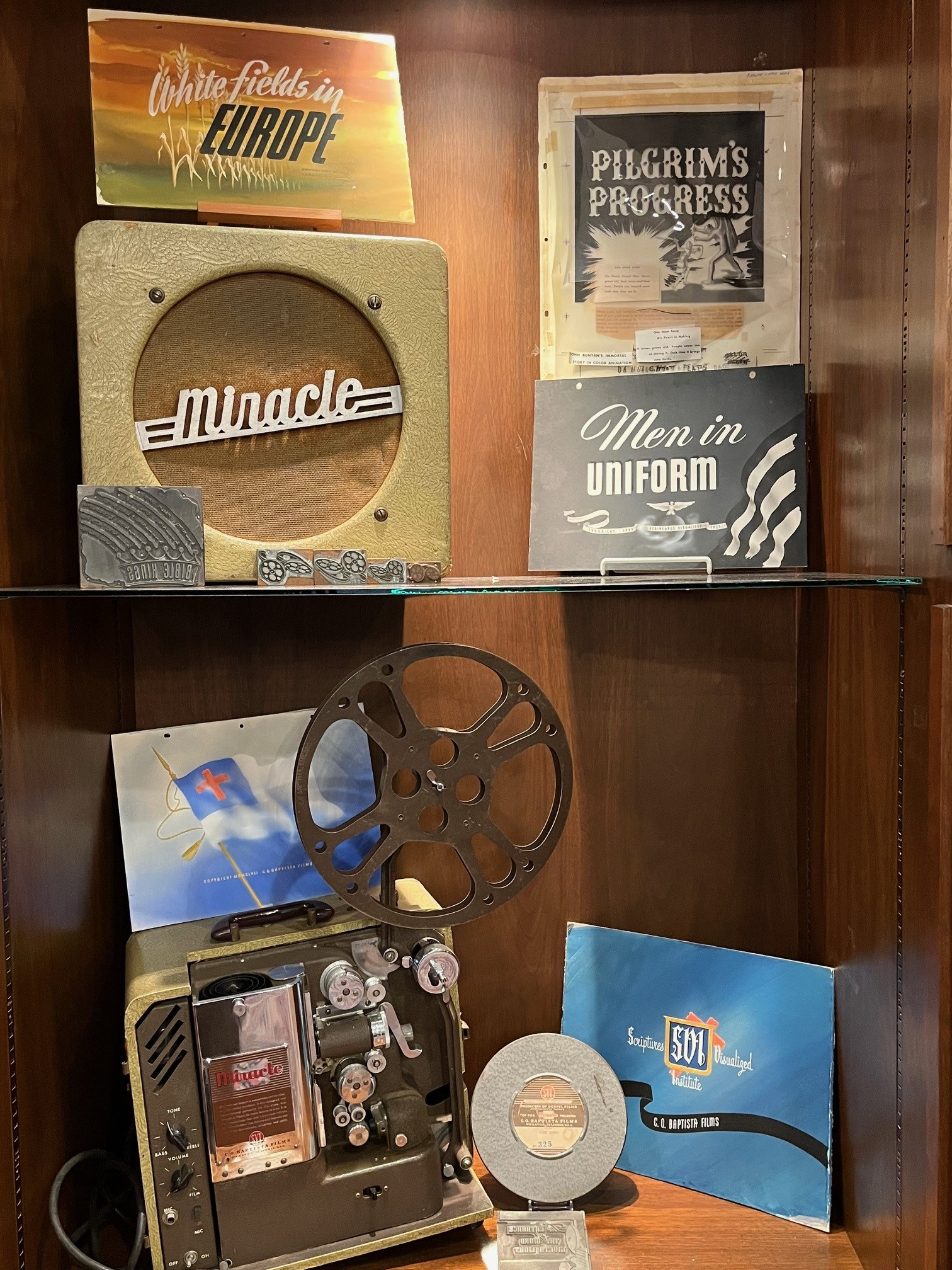
Artifacts from the C. O. Baptista Collection, Regent University Special Collections & Archives

Between 1939 and 1958, Baptista produced over 100 films and filmstrips in different formats and genres, including animation, drama, and sing-alongs. Eleven of his productions were missionary films, shot on location in Mexico, London, Rome, Paris, Egypt, Nigeria, French Equatorial Africa, French Indochina, South Korea, and the Holy Land.

In the early years of Baptista's filmmaking, cinema was not universally accepted by conservative churches as a tool for religious education, although as early as 1939, some congregations greeted The Story of a Fountain Pen with interest. Ironically for a filmmaker, Baptista shared this suspicion of his own art form: "Baptista never really trusted pictures, as he was convinced of the supremacy and efficacy of the word; thus his films are dominated by voice-overs and preaching."

The film genre in which Baptista's company produced works corresponding to the technological and artistic standards of the day, was animation. The technical staff of C. O. Baptista Films spent six months to design and build a thee-level animation camera, similar to the multi-plane camera that animation pioneer Ub Iwerk developed for Disney. The first fruit of this labor was Thankful Dandelion (1946), shot partly in black and white due to budgetary restrictions. Baptista's team spent the next four years perfecting the art of animated filmmaking. The culmination of these efforts came with the release in 1950 of the 55-minute fully colored retelling of Pilgrim's Progress, John Bunyan's allegory of the a Christian's pilgrimage through life, first published in 1678. Pilgrim's Progress required four and a half years and more than 100,000 individual cells to make. Probably the first feature-length Evangelical cartoon, the work is also Baptista's most enduring. In 1978, Maxwell Kerr abridged the film to 35 minutes and added a new sound track. The abridged version was released on both VHS and DVD.

== Film strips ==
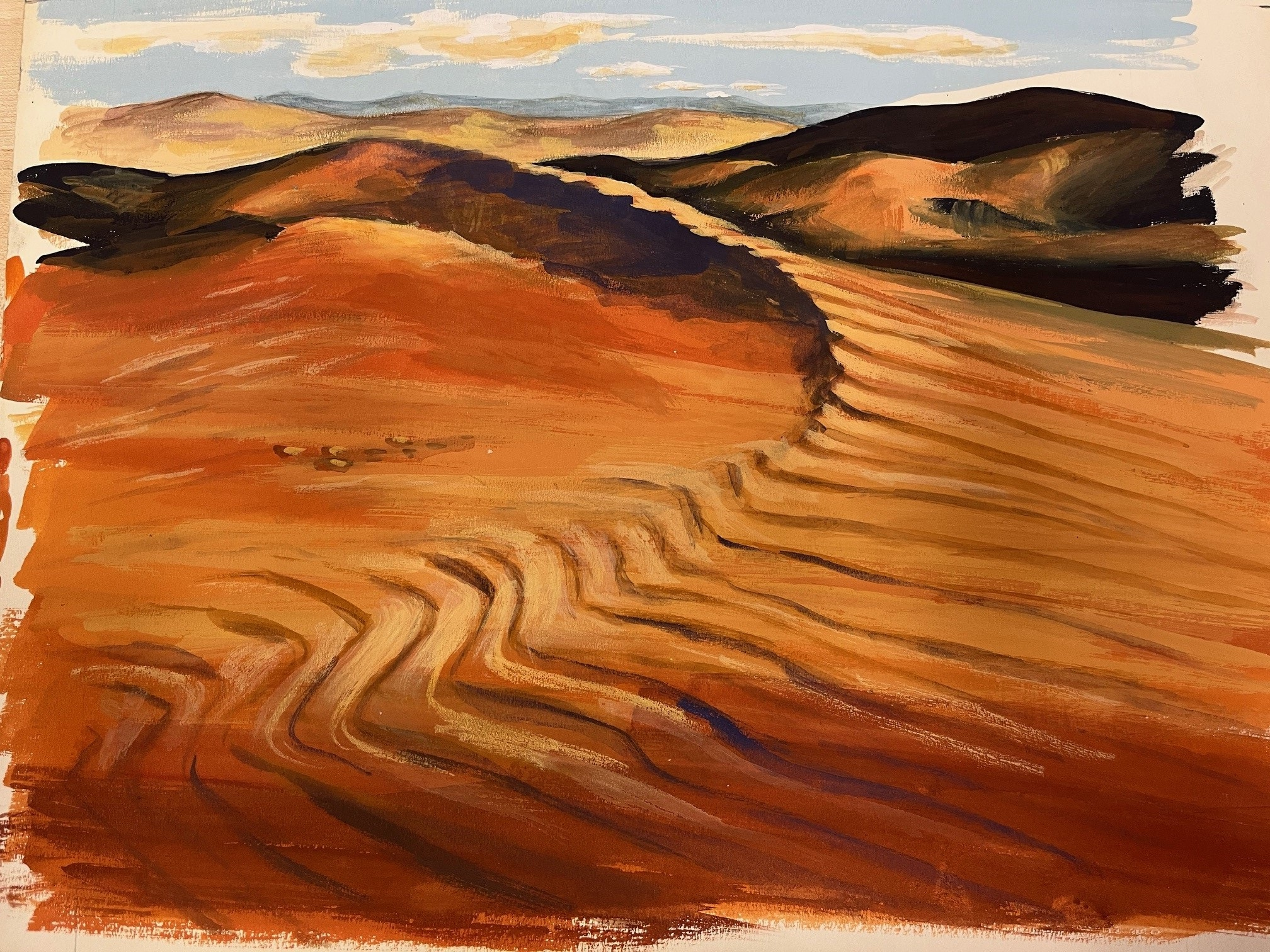
Original artwork for film strip "Have Thy Own Way, Lord" c. 1952–1958. Courtesy of Regent University Archives & Special Collections

Despite the company's prolific output, growing sophistication in animation, and a steady stream of testimonials about the spiritual efficacy of his films, Baptista's company perpetually faced financial difficulty. To reduce production costs and to introduce new churches to Baptista Film Mission's catalog, throughout the 1950s the company increasingly focused on film strips. Again, Baptista's resourceful technicians rose to the occasion and developed their patented projector, which synchronized strip frames with a tape player.

Over the decade the company released more than sixty film strips, both original titles and adaptations from its film catalog. Unfortunately, the venture into a new educational medium did not produce sufficient savings and revenue to save the company, and in 1964, Baptista was forced to declare bankruptcy. Despite this unhappy end, Maxwell Kerr, Baptista's sound technician, would reflect in an interview in 1982, "One of the biggest things that Baptista Films did for us was inspire us and train us in that field. It was a training ground, as well as an encouragement for the use of films in evangelistic fields."

== See also ==
- List of Christian film production companies
