= Late One Night =

2001 film by Dave Christiano

- DVD cover
- Directed by: Dave Christiano
- Written by: Dave Christiano
- Produced by: Dave Christiano
- Starring: Brad Heller, Josh Gaffga, Hugh McLean
- Edited by: Dave Christiano
- Distributed by: Dave Christiano
- Release date: 2001
- Running time: 33 minutes
- Country: United States
- Language: English

Late One Night is a Christian film released in 2001 by Dave Christiano. It stars Brad Heller, Josh Gaffga, Hugh McLean.

== Plot ==
In flashback, a young boy in his room overhears his father and pregnant mother fighting; his father shouts that he's leaving the family, and "hates that kid." 25 years later, at a bar, a man flirts with a girl, who abruptly says, "Drop dead." In a diner booth, three factory workers banter with the cook and waitress. Outside, a man offers cards to passersby, preaching, "God loves you." In the booth, Larry reluctantly describes an incident earlier at the factory: he was pursuing an office girl who, when she saw him coming, went the other way. Co-workers tried to persuade him to leave her alone. One, Riley, tried to tell him of the girl's religion, but Larry called him a "fake", and himself a "heathen." The boss summons Larry to his office to tell him of the complaint the girl filed, and orders him to leave her alone; Larry ends up calling him a fake as well. In the diner, the friends marvel at Larry's boldness. Outside, the preacher meets a man who acknowledges everything he says. The man enters the diner to sit at the counter. Larry pesters him for a conversation and, finding out that he is a Christian, taunts the man by calling him "Jesus" and questioning why other Christians are fakes. After Larry verbally accosts him several times, and messes with his food, the man tells him, "God loves you." Larry denies this increasingly aggressively, finally yelling in the man's face about his broken home, his lack of a wife or girlfriend, and his long history of prison time, grabs the passive man by the collar and demands to know how God loves him. The cook breaks it up, and the man leaves. Larry gets up to follow the man, and tries to pay the bill, but the cook reveals that "Jesus" paid it.

== Production and release ==
In 2000, it was announced that Christiano had begun filming, planning on a fall 2000 release. The film was released in 2001, and on DVD. It is one of the Christiano Brothers' films to be available on Sky Angel's "Video On Demand" service, announced in 2008, and is also available on Netflix.

The producer's website refers to "reach[ing] out with the message of this movie", and one reviewer noted its length as appropriate for small groups; the film has been used in that way.

== Reception ==
Ken James of ChristianAnswers.net gave Late One Night a "moral rating" of excellent and gave the movie's moviemaking quality four out of five stars. He described the film as "more evangelistic" than many other films, referring to scenes of a proselytizing street preacher, and the religious tract he hands out. James found the character of "Jesus" to deliver the film's "most effective message," and the film's conclusion to "speak volumes." He added that the film's 33 minute duration made it suitable for "youth groups, Sunday Schools, or one-on-one meetings."
