= Jordan Trovillion =

American actress and singer

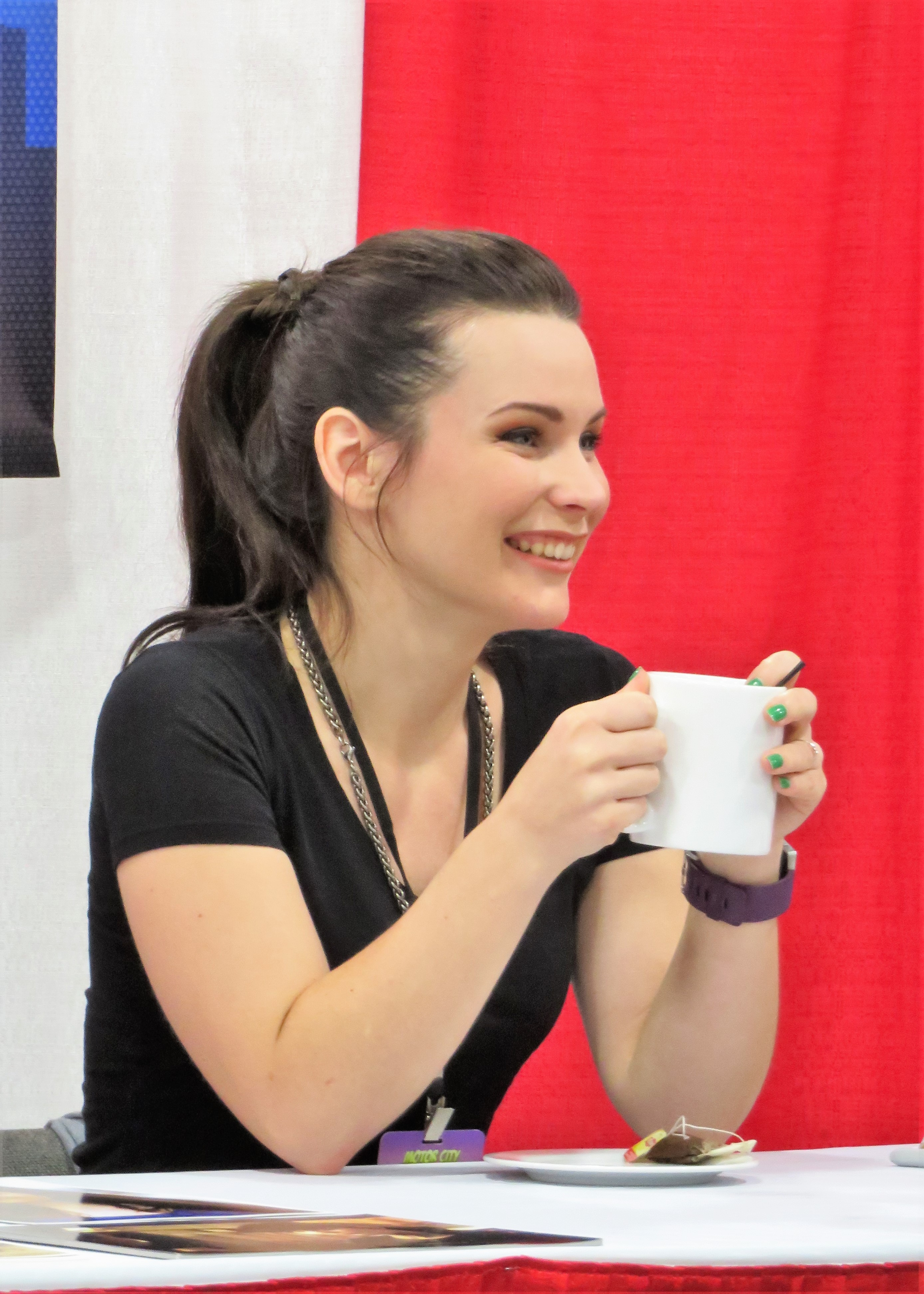
- Trovillion at Motor City Comic Con in 2017
- Education: University of Michigan - Flint
- Occupations: Actress, singer, model
- Years active: 2009–present

Jordan Trovillion is an American actress and singer. She has appeared in Detroiters and Secrets in the Walls.

She grew up in Michigan and started acting on stage in school, later studying theater at the University of Michigan-Flint.

== Filmography ==
Year	Title	Role	Notes
2009	Want	The Woman	
2010	The Genesis Code	Tanna	
2010	Trust	waitress	
2010	Vanishing on 7th Street	concession girl	
2010	Secrets in the Walls	Greta	TV movie
2011	Setup	Keli	
2011	Shadow Earth	Raven Delicotta	TV series, 2 episodes
2012	Amil the Ewok	Princess Rhea	TV series, 2 episodes
2012	Crave	young Emily	
2012	The Domino Effect	Sirisha's friend	
2012	Jack Reacher	Goodwill Cashier	
2013	Highland Park	Caroline	
2013	Sucker	Evelyn	
2014	Those Who Kill	Monica Albreath	TV series, 1 episode
2014	Horse Camp	Kathy	
2014	A Matter of Faith	Rachel Whitaker	
2014	Within	Laura	short
2015	Fractured	Maddy	
2015	Saugatuck Cures	Lindy	
2015	Golden Shoes	assistant	
2015	The Neverlands	Caleb's mother	short
2016	Kampout: Director's Cut	Susan	
2016	Eloise	garage girl	
2016	Elder Island	Brooke Ree	
2017	Horse Camp	Kathy	
2017	Needlestick	Sarah Hanna	
2017	Detroiters	Abigail	TV series, 1 episode
2017	Kampout	Susan	
2017	My Days of Mercy	Katlin	
2018	Gotti	Angel	
2018	Lizard of Dogs	Jane	short
2018	Blue	Jenna	
2018	Old Man & the Gun	Angela	
2019	Trash Polka	Mystery	short
2019	Love Immortal	Fiona	
