= C Me Dance =

- Theatrical release poster
- Directed by: Greg Robbins
- Written by: Greg Robbins
- Story by: Greg Robbins
- Starring: Christina DeMarco; Greg Robbins; Laura Romeo; Peter Kent
- Cinematography: Robert J. Sommer
- Edited by: David Kosor
- Music by: Stephen Tammearu
- Production company: Uplifting Entertainment
- Distributed by: Freestyle Releasing
- Release dates: April 2, 2009 (Washington, Pennsylvania); April 3, 2009 (United States)
- Running time: 89 minutes
- Country: United States
- Language: English
- Budget: $500,000

C Me Dance is a 2009 American Christian thriller film, written and directed by Greg Robbins. It was produced by Uplifting Entertainment, distributed by Freestyle Releasing, and was released on April 3, 2009. It has been endorsed by the Leukemia & Lymphoma Society and The Dove Foundation. It has had songs written by Lincoln Brewster, Eowyn, Stephanie Fraschetti and Terri Shamar.

== Plot ==
The story centers around a teenage girl named Sheri, whose desire is to join the Pittsburgh Ballet Theatre. At 17, fulfilling her dream, she discovers she has leukemia. Sheri rebels against her father and God, causing her father to seek to keep his daughter close to God, to soften her heart, and to live out her dream before dying, all while he anguishes over losing his daughter so young. While praying to God to ask for strength and clear direction for her remaining days, God blesses Sheri so she is able to bring people to Christ against their will.

== Filming ==
The film was shot in October 2008 in Pittsburgh and Carnegie, Pennsylvania.

== Release ==
C Me Dance premiered on April 2, 2009, at the Hollywood Theaters in Washington, Pennsylvania, and opened the following day in at least 150 theaters in twelve U.S. states: Alabama, Arkansas, Florida, Georgia, Louisiana, Mississippi, North Carolina, Ohio, Oregon, Pennsylvania, South Carolina and Tennessee.

=== Reception ===
The film's reviews were overwhelmingly negative. It has a 0% approval rating on the review aggregator Rotten Tomatoes, based on six reviews. Galen Holley of the Northeast Mississippi Daily Journal said, "C Me Dance is a darker, riskier movie that tends more toward mysticism than Christian social commentary," but did also say, "[C Me Dance is] creatively ambitious and bold." Luke Thompson of L.A. Weekly wrote that the film "plays like a fake Christian movie Troy McClure might end up starring in on an episode of The Simpsons, though it’s apparently for real". Gary Goldstein of the Los Angeles Times was also negative towards the film, saying, "it's fine to know your audience and cater to its entertainment needs, but even the most devout viewer subjected to Robbins' ham-fisted film might think, 'OK, now tell me something I don't already know'." The Huffington Post included the film in its article "The 9 Worst Movies Ever Made."
