= Christian Film Database =

Online database of Christian films

ChristianFilmDatabase.com (CFDb)
- Website type: An online database of Christian films on Blu-ray, DVD, VHS, 16mm, video-on-demand and those coming to Theaters.
- Available in: English
- Headquarters: Dawson Creek, British Columbia, Canada
- Owners: Desiree & Bryce Wisekal
- Creators: Annelie Rudlaff and Roger Rudlaff
- Website: ChristianFilmDatabase.com
- Advertising: Web banners, Blog spot, News Letter Positions, Email And Social Media Networking
- Commercial: Yes
- Registration: Registration is optional for members to leave comments and ratings films.
- Launched: 2008 with Ramp up in 2010
- Current status: Inactive

ChristianFilmDatabase.com, LLC (CFDb) was an online database of Christian films and their associated information. It was designed to be a Christian version of the Internet Movie Database.

== History of the CFDb website ==
CFDb was founded in 2008 by Roger Rudlaff who had previously created "The Wayhouse Christian Film Library", a library that lent Christian movies to the public. He and his wife Annelie Rudlaff started "The Wayhouse Christian Film Library" in 2001 by loaning out Christian books and VHS movies in Buena Vista, Colorado out of their home and showing a few films to the public in their town's chamber of commerce building. They later moved to Roanoke, Virginia, where they re-opened in 2006. While the Rudlaffs were running this lending library, Roger Rudlaff had difficulty finding certain Christian films, because the different films he searched for were scattered on many different websites. He started a specialist Christian films website called CFDb, after doing some research on IMDb. He was unable to claim the title of CMDb, because that domain name was taken by another Christian music website. He registered the CFDb domain name in 2008 and on Feb. 25 2011, the company became a LLC.

The database includes information on the films such as release date, running time, MPAA rating, formats, film director, film producer, screenwriter, film score composer, cinematographer, language and subtitles, film production company, film distribution company, cast, film trailer, film website, Facebook page, Twitter page, movie reviews, contact info, and synopsis.

In March 2012 the company made informal agreements with "Cruciflicks" and with "Indy Christian Review" for sharing Christian movie review content. In May 2012, CFDb signed an exclusive deal with Christian Book Distributors to sell the films listed on CFDb via Christian Book Distributors' website.

On March 13, 2013, CFDb and the crowdfunding website FaithLauncher announced a strategic alliance.

As of March 2021 the site is undergoing major renovations and is currently down.

== Criteria for inclusion ==
According to their website, the CFDb states that they are a non-denominational list of what they call "Christian films" and that "We list all films with a Christian message, it does not matter who makes it."

The CFDb states that two of their criteria for being a Christian film are: 1. "The film must show a need for God, Jesus, or the Holy Spirit in some way." 2. "The film is marketed to the Christian Community, therefore Christians will be searching for it on the database."

== Number of films ==
On January 1, 2010, there were approximately 1,250 films listed on CFDb, with more added weekly. Rudlaff said, "I list films in many formats, like 16mm, VHS, DVD, and now Blu-ray and (VOD) Video on Demand" As of January 2013, CFDb had over 1600 films listed, some of which have multiple film titles listed on one page as a series: these are counted as a single film.

== Rankings (CFDb's top 100) ==
In December 2012, the CFDb released its list of the top 100 Christian films for 2012.

=== Top 30 of 100 films ===
Rank	Film	Page views
1.	October Baby	23,722
2.	The Encounter	21,983
3.	Love’s Christmas Journey (Love Comes Softly Series)	17,219
4.	The Encounter 2: Paradise Lost	14,461
5.	Heaven is Waiting	10,386
6.	Last Ounce of Courage	9366
7.	Amazing Love:The Story of Hosea	9105
8.	For Greater Glory:The True Story of Cristiada	8983
9.	I Am Gabriel	8428
10.	Love’s Everlasting Courage (Love Comes Softly Series)	7983
11.	Loving the Bad Man	7659
12.	Church Girl	7462
13.	El Gran Milagro (The Greatest Miracle)	6492
14.	Marriage Retreat	6434
15.	The Mark	6387
16.	Hardflip	6078
17.	Jerusalem Countdown (film)	5868
18.	Me Again	5664
19.	Unconditional (film)	5582
20.	Escape	5557
21.	The Wylds (The Adventures of Chris Fable)	5058
22.	New Hope	4800
23.	Monumental: In Search of America's National Treasure	4692
24.	Thousand Pieces:The Nicky Cruz Story (Run Baby Run)	4349
25.	Left Behind: The Remake	4281
26.	The Shunning	4264
27.	A Mile in His Shoes	4237
28.	The Confession	3681
29.	Apostle Peter and the Last Supper	3672
30.	Nefarious: Merchant of Souls	3635
