= Christian History Institute =

American non-profit organization

Christian History Institute is a non-profit organization located in Worcester, Pennsylvania, producer or co-producer of several films, the Torchlighters: Heroes of the Faith series, and the founder of Christian History magazine.

It has EIN 22-2437121 as a 501(c)(3) Public Charity; in 2025 it reported $4,581,177 in total revenue and $7,393,467 in total assets.

== History ==
Founded by A. Kenneth Curtis (1939–2011) in 1982, Christian History Institute from its inception has issued film and print resources for laity education in Christian history, and now also offers online resources, including supplemental material for Christian films and videos, Christian History magazine, and Glimpses bulletins.

In 2004 the Institute moved its offices from Worcester to the campus of the Missio Seminary in Hatfield, Pennsylvania. Dr. David Dunbar, president of the Seminary, joined the board of trustees of the Institute and Institute President, Dr. Ken Curtis, joined the Seminary's board of Directors.

In 2019, Gateway Films/Vision Video became part of the Christian History Institute. Vision Video was also founded by A. Kenneth Curtis. In 2020, Vision Video launched the streaming service Redeem TV.

== Productions ==
=== Print publications ===
Today, Christian History Institute produces study guides on historical subjects, new issues of Christian History magazine, and Christian history videos for DVD and Television. It is most well known for producing the ongoing series The Torchlighters: Heroes of the Faith series, in cooperation with Voice of the Martyrs and International Films. The Torchlighters is a series animated biographies of Christian heroes for children, which has won numerous awards.

=== Film and television ===
The organization has produced a number of film and television productions.

- John Wycliffe: Morningstar. (1984) Best film of the year from Christian Film Distributors Association
- From Christ to Constantine: The Trial and Testimony of the Early Church. (1990) • Chris Award from Columbus International Film & Video Festival • Gold Award from Houston International Film & Video Festival;
- The Reformation Overview. (1995) Individual units within this package won over 30 international film awards.
- Candle in the Dark. (1998) • Gold Award at Christian Broadcasting Commission of UK 1998; • Gold Award at WorldFest Houston 1999; • Gold Award at Aurora Awards; • Bronze Plaque at Columbus International Film & Video Festival 1999; • Golden Eagle Award at CINE Golden Eagle Awards 1999;
- Jesus the New Way. (1998) • Chris Statuette at Columbus International Film & Video Festival 1998; • Gold Award at Worldfest Flagstaff 1998.
- Test of Time. (2001) A co-production with the BBC, the full title of this program is Putting the teachings of Jesus to the Test of Time, which it does through contemporary case studies. • Columbus Int’l Film & Video, Honorable Mention 2001

== Books ==
- Bewes, Richard. Wesley Country; a Pictorial History Based on John Wesley's Journal. Camp Hill, PA: Christian Publications, Inc.; Worcester, PA: Christian History Institute, 2005.
- Curtis, A. Kenneth. "The Hampton Court Conference." in Translation that Openeth the Window; Reflections on the History and Legacy of the King James Bible. Edited by David G. Burke. Atlanta: Society of Biblical Literature, 2009.
- Curtis, A. Kenneth. and Carsten Peter Thiede, eds. From Christ to Constantine; the Trial and Testimony of the Early Church. Worcester, PA: Christian History Institute, 1991.
- Curtis, A. Kenneth and Dan Graves. Great Women in Christian History; 37 women who changed their world. Camp Hill, PA: WingSpread Publications; Worcester, PA: Christian History Institute, 2004.
- ——— This Day in Christian History. Camp Hill, PA: Christian Publications, Inc., 2005.
- Curtis, A. Kenneth, J. Stephen Lang and Randy Petersen. Dates with Destiny: the One Hundred Greatest Events in Church History. Tarrytown, New York: Fleming H. Revell, 1991.
- George, Timothy. Faithful Witness; the Life and Mission of William Carey. Worcester, PA: Christian History Institute, 1998.
- Langmead, Clive. Robber of the Cruel Streets; the Prayerful Life of George Mueller. Crusade for World Revival; Worcester, PA: Christian History Institute, 2006.
- Radcliff, Kaylena. "Torchlighters Biography Series: Corrie ten Boom." Worcester, PA: Christian History Institute, 2014.
