= My Days of Mercy =

2017 film by Tali Shalom Ezer

- Theatrical release poster
- Directed by: Tali Shalom Ezer
- Written by: Joe Barton
- Produced by: David Hinojosa; Kate Mara; Elliot Page; Christine Vachon
- Starring: Kate Mara; Elliot Page (Note: Credited as Ellen Page); Amy Seimetz; Brian Geraghty; Elias Koteas
- Cinematography: Radek Ladczuk
- Edited by: Einat Glaser Zarhin
- Music by: Michael Brook
- Production companies: Killer Films; Great Point Media; Lexis Media
- Distributed by: Lionsgate (United States); Signature Entertainment (United Kingdom)
- Release dates: September 8, 2017 (TIFF); May 17, 2019 (United Kingdom); July 5, 2019 (United States)
- Running time: 108 minutes
- Countries: United States; United Kingdom
- Language: English

My Days of Mercy is a 2017 romantic drama film directed by Tali Shalom Ezer and written by Joe Barton. It stars Kate Mara, Elliot Page, Amy Seimetz, Brian Geraghty, and Elias Koteas.

It screened at the 2017 Toronto International Film Festival on September 8, 2017, as a Gala Presentation. It was released in the United Kingdom on May 17, 2019, by Signature Entertainment, and was released in the United States on July 5, 2019, by Lionsgate.

== Plot ==
Lucy Moro and her older sister Martha are anti-death penalty protestors, fighting for the acquittal of their father Simon, who is on death row for the murder of their mother eight years ago. The sisters live in their parents' house in a small Ohio town, and travel to various states in a mobile home, together with their little 10-year-old brother Ben.

At one demonstration outside a prison in Illinois, Lucy meets Mercy Bromage, a lawyer whose father is a police officer with ties to the death penalty case the crowd is protesting. Despite the political tensions between the two, Lucy and Mercy grow closer to each other. They begin to keep in contact over Skype. During a solo excursion to a demonstration in Missouri, Lucy and Mercy start a romance.

Meanwhile, Martha is determined to free Simon (who she still believes is innocent) and manages to hire a lawyer, who is then able to get a four-month stay of execution to look for legal loopholes or any new evidence to re-open the case. When the last of Martha and Lucy's legal appeals is denied and the evidence continues to point towards Simon, a distraught Lucy travels alone to Illinois to visit Mercy. There, she learns that Mercy still lives with her parents and has a boyfriend. Lucy breaks up with her. Regardless, Mercy attends Simon's execution with the sisters. Martha proposes they sell the house and move away for a fresh start, and Ben and Lucy agree.

Six months later, Lucy is a waitress in California when Mercy shows up. Mercy attempts to rekindle their relationship, but Lucy initially rejects her before deciding to give her another chance.

== Cast ==
- Elliot Page as Lucy Moro
- Kate Mara as Mercy Bromage
- Amy Seimetz as Martha Moro
- Charlie Shotwell as Ben Moro
- Brian Geraghty as Weldon
- Elias Koteas as Simon Moro
- Beau Knapp as Toby
- Tonya Pinkins as Agatha
- Jake Robinson as Ian
- Jordan Trovillion as Katlin

== Production ==
In August 2016, Elliot Page, Kate Mara, Pablo Schreiber, Elias Koteas and Amy Seimetz were cast in the film, with Tali Shalom Ezer directing from a screenplay by Joe Barton. Christine Vachon and David Hinojosa served as producers under their Killer Films banner, alongside Mara and Page, while Robert Halmi Jr. and Jim Reeve will serve as executive producers through their Great Point Media banner along with executive producer Karri O'Reilly. In September 2016, Brian Geraghty joined the cast of the film, replacing Schreiber.

Principal photography began on September 19, 2016.

== Release ==
The film had its world premiere at the Toronto International Film Festival on September 9, 2017. It was released in the United Kingdom on May 17, 2019, by Signature Entertainment, and was released in the United States on July 5, 2019, by Lionsgate.

== Reception ==
On review aggregator website Rotten Tomatoes, the film has an approval rating of 89% based on 19 reviews, and an average rating of 7/10. The website's critical consensus reads, "Though My Days of Mercy's knotty romance drifts into melodrama, it's grounded by Elliot Page and Kate Mara's exceptional chemistry."

The film was selected to compete for the Premio Maguey's Best Film award at the 33rd Guadalajara International Film Festival, where Page was awarded in the Best Performance category.
