= Susie's Law =

North Carolina state law

Susie's Law (House Bill 1690) is a 2010 North Carolina state law which authorizes up to two years in jail for convicted perpetrators of cruelty to animals.

== Passage of legislation ==
The law is named for "Susie", a part pit bull, part German Shepherd, which as a puppy was rescued by a woman who found her on August 20, 2009, in Greenfield Park in Greensboro, North Carolina, having been set on fire, in torment and left to die.

The woman took Susie to his nearby home where he then contacted Guilford County Animal Control to take her to a veterinarian. Susie was found to be suffering from severe second and third-degree burns over most of her body; her ears were burned off, and she had a broken jaw and teeth.

An animal cruelty investigation was launched by Guilford County Animal Control, but due to limited resources the investigation was taken over by a detective with Greensboro Police Department who set up a crimestoppers tip line. After a few months a tip was received and Lashawn Demaro Whitehead was arrested and charged with animal cruelty.

Susie was adopted by Donna Smith Lawrence, who had been seriously injured in an attack by a pit bull, which she had befriended, several months prior. Donna and her husband, Roy, reside in High Point, North Carolina.

The law reclassifies the "malicious abuse, torture, or killing" of an animal from a Class I to a Class H felony, with the ten-month potential period of confinement. LaShawn Whitehead received a two-year prison sentence on conviction of indecent liberties with a minor and burning his girlfriend's personal property, according to records of the North Carolina Department of Correction. At the time abuse of Whitehead's own dog would have netted no jail time, but Whitehead was found guilty of abusing an animal owned by another person, which brought jail time.

Susie's Law was passed unanimously in both the North Carolina State Senate and North Carolina House of Representatives and was signed into law by North Carolina Governor Beverly Perdue, and took effect on December 1, 2010. Passage was possible through intense citizen involvement when Susie's abuse became public, and fund-raising appeals met with great success.

== Aftermath ==
The 2013 film Susie's Hope by Uplifting Entertainment focuses on the Lawrences' story and their work to protect vulnerable animals. Emmanuelle Vaugier, a Canadian, is cast as Donna, Burgess Jenkins, a native of Winston-Salem, North Carolina, as Roy, and Andrea Powell as Ramona Hodges, Donna's close friend and neighbor. Jon Provost, former child actor on CBS's Lassie, appeared as then North Carolina State Senator Don Vaughan, a Democrat from Greensboro who pushed for passage of Susie's Law. Willette Thompson portrays Marsha Williams, the outspoken director of the Guilford County Animal Shelter in Greensboro. The name of LaShawn Whitehead is changed in the film to Shawn Griffin, with Cranston Johnson cast in the part.

Susie subsequently became a certified therapy dog, and was regularly taken to schools, churches, and hospitals to warn of the danger of animal abuse and to promote kindness and respect. In 2014, the American Humane Association named Susie its "Hero Dog" in the category of "Dog Therapy".

Susie died in September 2022.

== See also ==
- List of individual dogs
