= Marshall Teague =

Marshall Teague may refer to:

- Marshall Teague (racing driver) (1921–1959), American racing driver
- Marshall Teague (actor) (born 1953), American film and television performer
