= Christian History =

Magazine

- Editor: Chris R. Armstrong
- Categories: Church history
- Frequency: Quarterly
- Publisher: Christian History Institute (1982-1989, 2011-present); Christianity Today International (1989-2008)
- First issue: 1982
- Website: www.christianhistoryinstitute.org/magazine/
- OCLC: 729257395

Christian History is a magazine on the history of Christianity. It was established by Ken Curtis in 1982 and published by the Christian History Institute. It began as a series of resource guides designed to supplement films about major figures in the history of the church, transitioning from an "occasional" publication to a quarterly magazine in 1984. In 1989, it was sold to Christianity Today International, which changed the name of the magazine to Christian History & Biography in 2004. In 2008 publication ceased after issue 99. Christian History Institute reclaimed custody of the title and revived the publication in 2011.
