= Gavin MacLeod =

American actor (1931–2021)

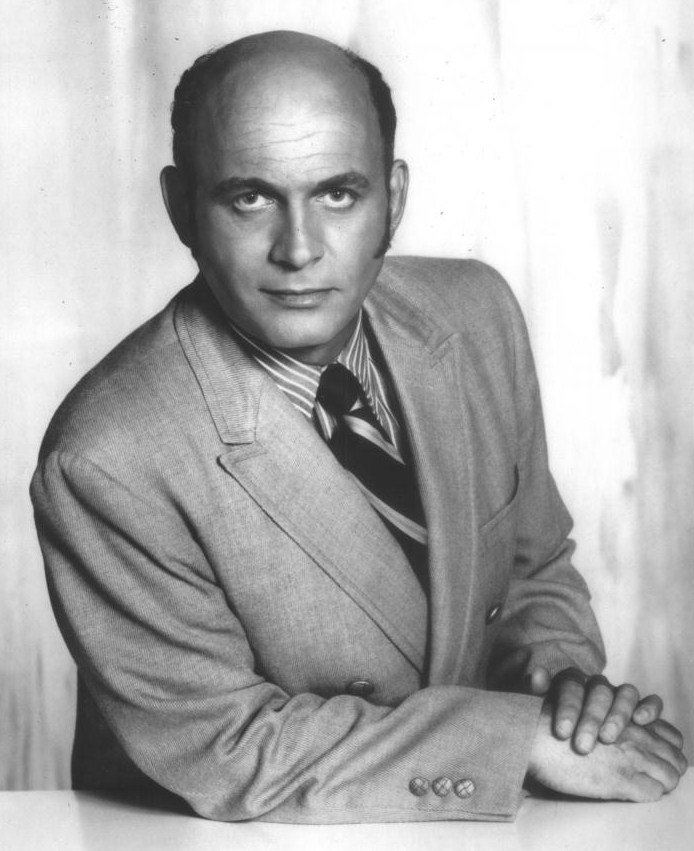
- MacLeod in a publicity photo for The Mary Tyler Moore Show in 1970
- Born: Allan George See; February 28, 1931; Mount Kisco, New York, U.S.
- Died: May 29, 2021 (aged 90); Palm Desert, California, U.S.
- Resting place: Forest Lawn Cemetery
- Education: Ithaca College (BFA)
- Occupations: Actor; author
- Years active: 1955–2017
- Known for: Murray Slaughter on The Mary Tyler Moore Show; Captain Merrill Stubing on The Love Boat
- Spouses: Joan F. Rootvik (m. 1955; div. 1972); Patti Kendig (m. 1974; div. 1982); (m. 1985)
- Children: 4
- Military service
- Allegiance: United States
- Branch: United States Air Force
- Years: 1952–1954
- Rank: Airman

Gavin MacLeod (/məˈklaʊd/ mə-KLOWD; born Allan George See; February 28, 1931 – May 29, 2021) was an American actor best known for his roles as news writer Murray Slaughter on The Mary Tyler Moore Show and ship's captain Merrill Stubing on ABC's The Love Boat. After growing up Catholic, MacLeod became an evangelical Christian in 1984. His career, which spanned six decades, included work as a Christian television host, author, and guest on several talk, variety, and religious programs.

MacLeod's career began in films in 1957. In 1960 he was on an episode of Death Valley Days named "Yankee Confederate". In 1965, he starred in The Sword of Ali Baba. In 1967 he played a British Cpl. Tommy Behran in an episode of Combat. He went on to appear in A Man Called Gannon (1968), in The Thousand Plane Raid (1969), and in Kelly's Heroes (1970).

MacLeod also achieved continuing television success co-starring alongside Ernest Borgnine on McHale's Navy (1962–1964) as Joseph "Happy" Haines.

== Early life ==
Gavin MacLeod was born Allan George See on February 28, 1931, in Mount Kisco, New York. His mother, Margaret (née Shea) See (1906–2004), a middle school dropout, worked for Reader's Digest. His father, George See (1906–1945), an electrician, was part Chippewa (Ojibwe). His brother Ronald was three years his junior. He grew up in Pleasantville, New York, and studied acting at Ithaca College, from which he graduated in 1952 with a bachelor's degree in fine arts.

After serving in the United States Air Force, he moved to New York City and worked at Radio City Music Hall while looking for acting work. At about this time he changed his name, drawing "Gavin" from a physically disabled victim in a television drama, and "MacLeod" from his Ithaca drama coach, Beatrice MacLeod. MacLeod said in a 2013 interview with Parade about his stage name, he "felt as if my name was getting in the way of my success." Allan, he wrote, "just wasn't strong enough", and See was "too confusing".

== Career ==
MacLeod made his television debut in 1957 on The Walter Winchell File at the age of 26. His first movie appearance was a small, uncredited role in The True Story of Lynn Stuart in 1958. Soon thereafter, he landed a credited role in I Want to Live!, a 1958 prison drama starring Susan Hayward. He was soon noticed by Blake Edwards, who in 1958 cast him in the pilot episode of his NBC series Peter Gunn, two guest roles on the Edwards CBS series Mr. Lucky in 1959, and as a nervous and harried Navy yeoman in Operation Petticoat, with Cary Grant and Tony Curtis. Operation Petticoat proved to be a breakout role for MacLeod, and he was soon cast in two other Edwards' comedies, High Time with Bing Crosby and The Party with Peter Sellers.

In December 1961, he landed a guest role on The Dick Van Dyke Show, which was his first time working with Mary Tyler Moore. MacLeod also had guest appearances on Perry Mason, The Andy Griffith Show, Ben Casey, The Big Valley, Hogan's Heroes, Ironside, and My Favorite Martian. He played the role of a drug pusher, "Big Chicken", in two episodes of the first season of Hawaii Five-O.

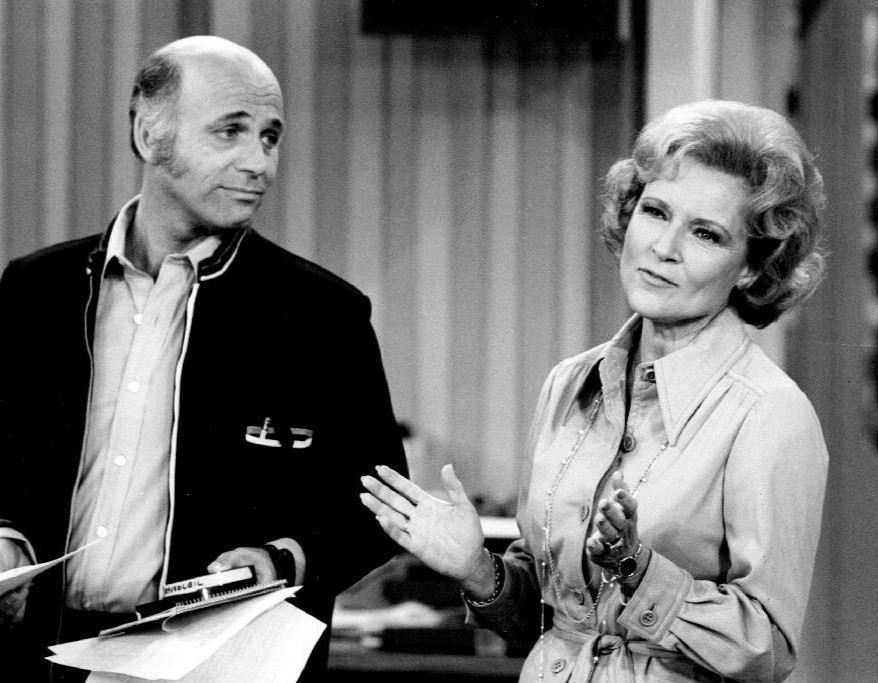
MacLeod with Betty White on the set of The Mary Tyler Moore Show in August 1975

His first regular television role began in 1962 as Joseph "Happy" Haines on McHale's Navy, but he was frustrated with the role's limitations. He later described Haines as "not much of a character" who had "two lines a week", and was sometimes simply used as a prop: "Sometimes they'd have me stand there. They'd shoot on a back lot, and they'd use me to cover something they didn't want anybody to see on the back lot." McLeod left the show after two seasons to appear as Signalman 2nd Class Crosley in the film The Sand Pebbles with Steve McQueen.

MacLeod's second breakout role, as Murray Slaughter on CBS's The Mary Tyler Moore Show, won him lasting fame and two Golden Globe Award nominations. His starring role as Captain Stubing on The Love Boat, his next television series, was broadcast in 90 countries worldwide, between 1977 and 1986, spanning nine seasons. His work on that show earned him three Golden Globe nominations. Co-starring with him was a familiar actor and best friend Bernie Kopell as Dr. Adam Bricker and Ted Lange as bartender Isaac Washington. Lange said in a 2017 interview with The Wiseguyz Show of MacLeod that "Oh yeah, sure, Gavin was wonderful. Gavin lives down here in Palm Springs and we're still tight, all of us, Gavin and Bernie and Jill; we still see each other. Fred (Grandy) lives in a different state, we're still close, we're still good friends."

For the summer of 1986, immediately following the finale of The Love Boat, MacLeod spent the summer touring in a production of Never Too Late (play) as Harry Lambert, and in a nod to The Love Boat, Marion Ross who played his wife in the finale toured with him as his wife in this production. In August of that summer the play was presented at Denver's historic Elitch Theatre.

MacLeod became the global ambassador for Princess Cruises in 1986. He played a role in ceremonies launching many of the line's new ships. In 1997, MacLeod joined the Love Boat cast on The Oprah Winfrey Show.

After The Love Boat, MacLeod toured with Michael Learned (of The Waltons) in Love Letters. He made several appearances in musicals such as Gigi and Copacabana between 1997 and 2003. In December 2008, he appeared with the Colorado Symphony in Denver.

MacLeod and his wife were hosts on the Trinity Broadcasting Network for 17 years, primarily hosting a show about marriage called Back on Course. MacLeod appeared in Rich Christiano's Time Changer, a movie about time travel and how the morals of society have moved away from the Bible. He also plays the lead role in Christiano's 2009 film The Secrets of Jonathan Sperry.

=== Later activity ===
In April 2010, the entire cast of The Love Boat attended the TV Land Awards with the exception of MacLeod, due to a back operation to repair a couple of injured discs. Former co-star and long-term friend Ted Lange contacted him and received word that MacLeod was doing well. In December, MacLeod appeared as a guest narrator with the Florida Orchestra and Master Chorale of Tampa Bay.

MacLeod served as the honorary Mayor of Pacific Palisades for five years, until Sugar Ray Leonard succeeded him in 2011. On February 28, 2011, MacLeod celebrated his 80th birthday aboard the Golden Princess on Princess Cruises in Los Angeles, California. His friends and family wished him a happy birthday and presented him with a 5-foot-long (1.5 m) 3-D cake replica of the Pacific Princess, the original "Love Boat".

MacLeod appeared on the special for Betty White's 90th birthday on January 17, 2012. He reunited with White to film "Safety Old School Style", an in-flight safety video for Air New Zealand in 2013. By January 2013, the video had been viewed two million times on YouTube. In October 2013, MacLeod appeared on Today to begin the promotional tour for his new book This Is Your Captain Speaking: My Fantastic Voyage Through Hollywood, Faith & Life. This appearance included a special set change to honor MacLeod's appearance on the show. In addition to television appearances, he continued his national book tour.

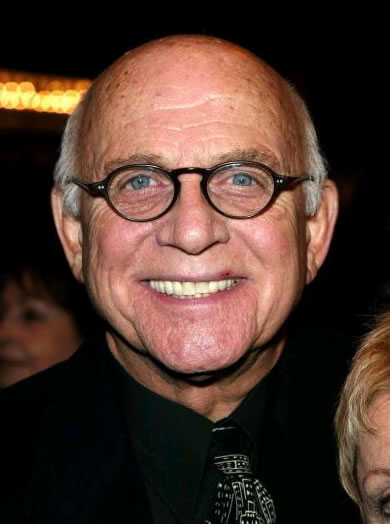
MacLeod in 2006

On November 5, 2013, MacLeod joined his Love Boat cast mates live on the CBS daytime show The Talk. A full one-hour episode was dedicated to the cast reunion. The Talk co-hosts dressed in costumes to commemorate their special guests' arrivals. Spanish-American actress Charo also appeared on the reunion show. Charo guest-starred in eight episodes of The Love Boat. Jack Jones performed the Love Boat theme song, which he introduced in 1977.

In December 2013, MacLeod appeared on The 700 Club to discuss his life and career. The following year, on February 1, MacLeod was honored with a star on the Palm Springs Walk of Stars in downtown Palm Springs, California. In January 2015, MacLeod appeared in the Rose Parade along with several other members of the original cast of The Love Boat. Later that same year MacLeod starred in the play Happy Hour at the Coachella Valley Repertory Theatre (CVRep) in Rancho Mirage, California, a role which earned him critical praise.

== Writing ==
In 1987, following MacLeod's conversion to evangelical Christianity and remarriage, he and his wife, Patti, wrote about his struggles with alcoholism and their divorce in Back On Course: The Remarkable Story of a Divorce That Ended in Remarriage.

In the 1980s Gavin and his wife Patti started a seminar called Born Again Marriages in order to share their journey with others going through separation or divorce.

In 2013, MacLeod released a memoir, This Is Your Captain Speaking: My Fantastic Voyage Through Hollywood, Faith & Life. He said, "...all my living has been based on what other people have written... I hope it can help others, how I overcame and never gave up. There are so many lessons in life." In the book, MacLeod recounted his stories as a young actor trying to make a name for himself in Hollywood, the lifelong friends he made, struggles with alcoholism, divorce, and faith.

== Personal life ==
While working as an usher and elevator operator at Radio City Music Hall, MacLeod met dancer Joan F. Rootvik, who was a Rockette. They married in 1955 and had two sons and two daughters before divorcing in 1972.

In 1974, he married Patti Kendig. The couple divorced in 1982 and remarried in 1985. During the mid-1980s, they became evangelical Christians and credited their faith for bringing them back together.

On September 20, 2009, MacLeod discussed his conversion to evangelicalism at The Rock Church in Anaheim, California, and was a guest speaker there in 2012.

MacLeod died at his home in Palm Desert, California, on May 29, 2021, at the age of 90. He is interred at Forest Lawn Cemetery in Cathedral City.

== Filmography ==
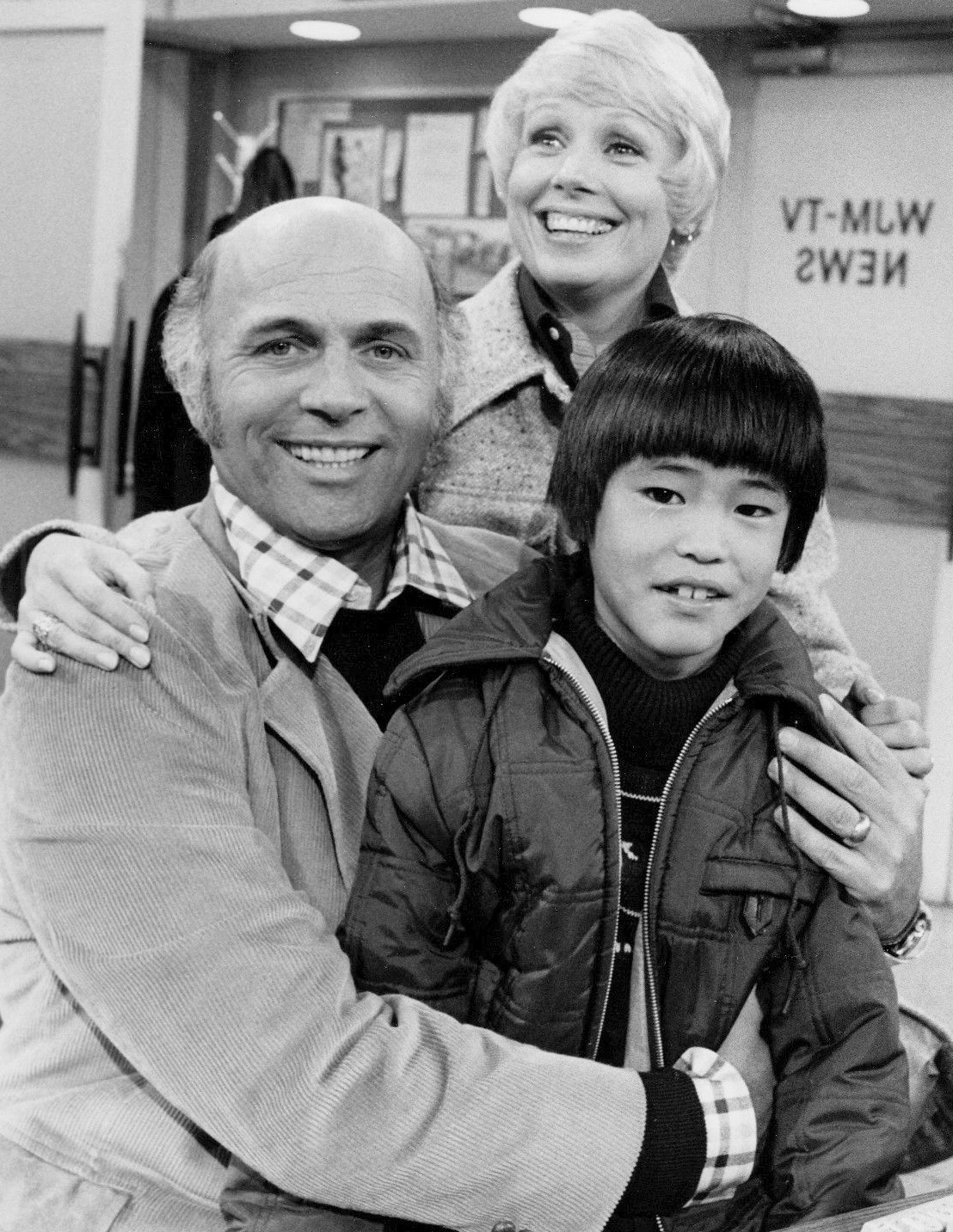
MacLeod with Joyce Bulifant and Michael Higa on The Mary Tyler Moore Show in May 1975

=== Film ===
Year	Title	Role	Source
1958	I Want to Live!	The Lieutenant	
1959	Compulsion	Padua – Horn's Assistant	
1959	Pork Chop Hill	Private Saxon	
1959	Operation Petticoat	Seaman Ernest Hunkle, USN	
1959	The Gene Krupa Story	Ted Krupa (uncredited)	
1960	Twelve Hours to Kill	Johnny	
1960	High Time	Professor Thayer	
1961	The Crimebusters	Harry Deiner	
1962	War Hunt	Pvt. Crotty	
1964	McHale's Navy	Seaman Joseph Haines	
1965	The Sword of Ali Baba	Hulagu Khan	
1965	McHale's Navy Joins the Air Force	Seaman Joseph Haines	
1965	Deathwatch	Emil	
1966	And Baby Makes Three	Dr. Charles Norwood	
1966	The Sand Pebbles	Crosley	
1968	A Man Called Gannon	Lou	
1968	The Party	C.S. Divot	
1969	The Thousand Plane Raid	Sgt. Kruger	
1969	The Comic	1st Director	
1970	The Intruders	Warden	
1970	Kelly's Heroes	Private Moriarty, Oddball's bow machine-gunner and mechanic	
2002	Time Changer	Dr. Norris Anderson	
2009	The Secrets of Jonathan Sperry	Jonathan Sperry	

=== Television ===
Year	Title	Role	Notes	Source
1957	The Walter Winchell File	Crook	Episode: "Act of Folly"	
1958	U.S. Marshal	Buck	Episode: "The Arraignment"	
1958	The Walter Winchell File	Stone Ballston	Episode: "The Walkout"	
1958–60	Peter Gunn	George Fallon / Mitch Borden	2 episodes	
1959–60	Mr. Lucky	Salesman / Bugsy McKenna	2 episodes	
1959	Men into Space	Dave Parsons	"Lost Missile"	
1959	Steve Canyon	Jack Olsen	Episode: "The Robbery"	
1959–62	The Untouchables	Artie McLeod / Three-Fingered Jack White / William 'Porker' Davis / Whitey Metz	4 episodes	
1960–68	Death Valley Days	Phil Arnold / Dandy Martin	2 episodes	
1961	Dr. Kildare	Lorenzo Lawson	Episode: "Winter Harvest"	
1961	Straightaway		Episode: "The Heist"	
1961	The Dick Van Dyke Show	Maxwell Cooley	Episode: "Empress Carlotta's Necklace"	
1961	The Investigators	Frankie Giff	Episode: "Style of Living"	
1961–65	Perry Mason	Dan Platte / Mortimer Hershey / Lawrence Comminger	3 episodes	
1962–64	McHale's Navy	Seaman Joseph "Happy" Hanes	73 episodes	
1964	The Munsters	Paul Newmar	Episode: "The Sleeping Cutie"	
1965	Rawhide	Rian Powers	Episode: "The Meeting"	
1965	Gomer Pyle, U.S.M.C.	Fred Fay	Episode: "Dance, Marine, Dance"	
1965	The Andy Griffith Show	Bryan Bender / Gilbert Jamel	2 episodes	
1965	The Man from U.N.C.L.E.	Cleveland	Episode: "The Hong Kong Shilling Affair"	
1965–66	My Favorite Martian	Alvin Wannamaker	2 episodes	
1966–69	Hogan's Heroes	Gen. von Rauscher / Maj. Kiegel / Gen. Metzger / Maj. Zolle	4 episodes	
1967	Combat!	British Sgt. Tommy Behan	Episode: "The Masquers"	
1966	The Rat Patrol	Sgt. Gribs	Episode: "The Fatal Chase Raid"	
1967	The Road West	Nick Marteen	Episode: "The Eighty-Seven Dollar Bride"	
1967–69	The Big Valley	Clute / O'Leary / Mace	3 episodes	
1968–70	It Takes a Thief	Gen. Contell / Seymour / Maj. Kazan	3 episodes	
1968	Death Valley Days	prospector Phil Arnold	Episode: "The Great Diamond Mines"	
1969	The Flying Nun	Harold Harmon	Episode: "A Star Is Reborn"	
1968–69	Hawaii Five-O	Big Chicken	2 episodes	
1970–77	The Mary Tyler Moore Show	Murray Slaughter	168 episodes	
1974	Only with Married Men	Jordan Robbins	Movie	
1974	Tattletales	Himself	Games Show/One Week (5 episodes) with wife Patti	
1977	Ransom for Alice!	Yankee Sullivan	Movie	
1977–87	The Love Boat	Captain Merrill Stubing	250 episodes	
1980	Murder Can Hurt You	Nojack	Movie	
1980	Scruples	Curt Arvey	Miniseries	
1985	Hotel	Martin 'Merrick' Brenner	Episode: "Fallen Idols"	
1986	The Greatest Adventure: Stories from the Bible	Daniel	Episode: "Daniel and the Lion's Den"	
1987	Student Exchange	Vice Principal Durfner	Movie	
1990	Murder, She Wrote	Art Sommers	Episode: "The Big Show of 1965"	
1991	The General Motors Playwrights Theater	Michael Holmes	Episode: "The Last Act Is a Solo"	
1993	CBS Schoolbreak Special	Robert Carter	Episode: "If I Die Before I Wake"	
1994	Burke's Law	Jerry Marz	Episode: "Who Killed the Host at the Roast?"	
1994	New Year’s Eve with Guy Lombardo and His Royal Canadians	Emcee	Special	
1998	Love Boat: The Next Wave	Captain Merrill Stubing	Episode: "Reunion"	
2000	Oz	Cardinal Frances Abgott	Episode: "Works of Mercy"	
2001–02	The King of Queens	Uncle Stu	2 episodes	
2002–03	JAG	Raymond Harrick	Episode: "Standards of Conduct"	
2003	Touched by an Angel	Calvin	Episode: "The Show Must Not Go On"	
2006	That '70s Show	Smitty	2 episodes	
2009	The Suite Life on Deck	Mr. Barker	2 episodes	
2011	Pound Puppies	Captain Gumble (voice)	Episode: "Bone Voyage"	

Preceded by Steve Guttenberg	Honorary mayor of Pacific Palisades, California; 2006–2011	Succeeded by Sugar Ray Leonard
