= Pastor Greg =

- Genre: Christian Sitcom
- Created by: Greg Robbins
- Written by: Greg Robbins
- Starring: Greg Robbins, Shelby Young, Jim Young, Tony Nunes, Jack Blackburn
- Country of origin: United States
- Original language: English
- No. of seasons: 3

Production
- Executive producers: Greg Robbins; Chuck Alexander; Ron Hembree; Calvin Kennedy
- Production company: Uplifting Entertainment

Original release
- Network: Cornerstone Television (2005 - 2007); Trinity Broadcasting Network (2007 - 2008)
- Release: October 13, 2005 – May 30, 2008

Pastor Greg is a Christian sitcom, the first Christian television show of this genre. Debuted in 2005, it ran for three seasons. The series is not filmed before a studio audience and uses a laugh track.

The series was initially co-produced by Uplifting Entertainment and Cornerstone Television; when the series debuted, it was one of the first regularly scheduled religious television series to be produced in High Definition. To achieve this notoriety, Cornerstone added more infomercials to its schedule and cancelled some of its other programs in order to defray the cost of two HDTV cameras bought for the show. In addition, following the lead of many American series (especially dramas), production later shifted to Canada; the show's second season was filmed in Orangeville, Ontario. Greg Robbins has said, "Without the amazing talent of Shelby Young, Jim Young, Tony Nunes and Jack Blackburn this series would not have happened. Jim and Shelby Young showed great courage and moved across the USA to help pioneer this show. Calvin Kennedy the shows first director helped mold the series. Ron Hembree and CTVN led the charge. Without them and many others this would not have happened. My family trusted me with this task and stood by me during very difficult times. My wife and kids are my heroes!"

== Cast ==
- Greg Robbins as Pastor Greg

Tony Nunes as Flo (2005-2007)

- Shelby Young as Lori (2005, 2008)
- Jim Young as John (2005-2008)

Other notable castmembers include Dawn Wells, Eddie Mekka, Mel Novak.
