= Gateway Films/Vision Video =

- Industry: Film
- Founded: 1969
- Headquarters: Worcester, Pennsylvania, United States
- Website: visionvideo.com

Gateway Films/Vision Video is an independent Christian film company located in Worcester, Pennsylvania, notable for producing The Cross and the Switchblade and other award-winning films, docu-dramas and documentaries of interest to Christian audiences.

== History ==
Founded in 1969, Gateway Films created its niche within the Christian film industry after it was nominated to distribute The Cross and the Switchblade whose producer had entered receivership. Gateway Films afterward produced successful theatrical and television releases, many (such as the original Shadowlands, 1985) in conjunction with the BBC.

Vision Video was formed in 1981 to explore the growing video field. Today it’s a significant producer and vendor of DVD’s geared to Christian and family audiences, the majority of them its own productions or co-productions, and many of them award-winners.

A number of the company's early productions and co-productions focused on Christian biography, such as First Fruits (Count Zinzendorf and Moravian missions), Jan Hus (life and trial of the Bohemian martyr), God's Outlaw (starring Roger Rees as William Tyndale) and John Wycliffe: the Morningstar. Christian biography is a genre to which the company has often returned, as for example in its co-production of Bonhoeffer: Agent of Grace (with the BBC and others) and the 2010 John Wesley: a Heart Transformed Can Change the World (with Foundery Pictures).

The Cross and the Switchblade introduced actor Erik Estrada to film audiences, playing alongside entertainer Pat Boone. Shadowlands with Joss Ackland as C.S. Lewis and Claire Bloom as Joy Gresham, won two BAFTA TV Awards and the 1986 International Emmy for best Drama.

In 2019, Gateway Films/Vision Video became part of the Christian History Institute, also founded by A. Kenneth Curtis. In 2020, Vision Video launched the streaming service Redeem TV.
