= Last Ounce of Courage =

- Theatrical release poster
- Directed by: Darrel Campbell; Kevin McAfee
- Screenplay by: Darrel Campbell
- Story by: Richard Headrick; Gina Headrick; Darrel Campbell; Kevin McAfee
- Produced by: Kevin McAfee
- Starring: Marshall R. Teague; Jennifer O'Neill; Fred Williamson
- Cinematography: Jason Cantu
- Edited by: Miles Hanon
- Music by: Ronald Owen
- Production company: Veritas Entertainment
- Distributed by: Rocky Mountain Pictures
- Release date: September 14, 2012
- Running time: 101 minutes
- Country: United States
- Language: English
- Box office: $3,329,674

Last Ounce of Courage is a 2012 American Christian Christmas drama film directed by Darrel Campbell and Kevin McAfee and starring Marshall R. Teague, Jennifer O'Neill, and Fred Williamson. It centers on the struggle of Bob Revere, a man dealing with what he feels is his freedom of religion being attacked by the government of his community and an ACLU-like group.

The film was universally panned by film critics and audiences.

== Synopsis ==
After the death of his son Thomas, Bob Revere (Teague), the mayor of Mount Columbus, has to deal with politicians removing Christmas and starts a controversial protest.

== Cast ==
- Marshall R. Teague as Bob Revere
- Fred Williamson as Warren Hammerschmidt
- Jennifer O'Neill as Dottie Revere
- Hunter Gomez as Christian Revere
- Jenna Boyd as Maddie Rogers
- Nikki Novak as Kari Revere
- Rusty Joiner as Greg Rogers
- Benjy Gaither as Ernie
- Austin Marks as Thomas Revere
- Bill O'Reilly as himself

== Theatrical run ==
Last Ounce of Courage was released on September 14, 2012 at 1,407 locations in the United States and grossed $1.59 million in its opening weekend, ranking 15th at the box office. Box Office Mojo reported that unlike most Christian films that depend on word of mouth, commercials were run for Last Ounce of Courage. The website said this indicated that the opening was "probably a pretty serious financial disappointment". As of September 23, the film has grossed an estimated $3,329,674.

== Critical reception ==
Last Ounce of Courage was universally panned by film critics. On the review aggregator website Rotten Tomatoes, 0% of 16 critics' reviews are positive. Metacritic, which uses a weighted average, assigned the film a score of 11 out of 100, based on five critics, indicating "overwhelming dislike". As The Washington Post puts it, "Its effectiveness depends entirely on the degree to which you already believe its talking points." Actor and activist Chuck Norris said of the film, "It was an easy choice to endorse this film because its message is consistent with my life principles and core values."

Michael O'Sullivan of The Washington Post said it was "preaching to the choir". Robert Abele of the Los Angeles Times said of the film, "The patriot-packaged Last Ounce of Courage has been made with the conviction of true zealots, but also the competence of amateurs." In contrast, Movieguide, a conservative Christian film review site, says of the film, "Last Ounce of Courage ends on several positive notes that make it recommended viewing for everyone."

== Lawsuit ==
Last Ounce of Courage was the subject of a 2014 class action lawsuit. The lawsuit alleges that the film's marketing team conducted a massive robocall advertising campaign, which was alleged to be in violation of the Telephone Consumer Protection Act. In 2017, a federal judge awarded $32.4 million to the plaintiffs.

== See also ==
- List of Christmas films
