= Dave Christiano =

American film director

- Born: 2 October 1956 (age 69)
- Occupation: Film director
- Known for: Christian filmmaking
- Relatives: Rich Christiano (brother)
- Website: ChristianFilms.com

Dave Christiano (born October 2, 1956) is a Christian filmmaker and twin brother of Rich Christiano. He owns Dave Christiano Films and ChristianFilms.com. Several of Christiano's films have been released to theaters.

In 2004, Christiano began producing 7th Street Theater, which was to be the first ever primetime Christian dramatic TV series. After shooting the first 24 episodes for the first season, it premiered on 3 March 2007 on the Trinity Broadcasting Network. The series eventually began to show on SAFE TV on Oct 21st, 2013.

== Filmography ==
=== Film ===
Year	Film					
Year	Film	Director	Writer	Producer	Editor	Notes
1998	Pamela's Prayer	Yes	Yes	Yes	Yes	Also cinematographer
2008	Me & You, Us, Forever	Yes	Yes	Yes	Yes	Also sound editor
2009	The Secrets of Jonathan Sperry	No	Yes	No	No	
2012	Amazing Love: The Story of Hosea	No	Yes	No	Yes	
2014	A Matter of Faith	No	Yes	No	Yes	
2016	Remember The Goal	Yes	Yes	Yes	Yes	
2018	Power of the Air	Yes	Yes	Yes	Yes	
2019	The Perfect Race	Yes	Yes	Yes	Yes	
2023	Always a Winner	Yes	Yes	Yes	Yes	

=== Short film ===
Year	Film						
Year	Film	Director	Writer	Producer	Editor	Cinematographer	Notes
1986	The Daylight Zone	Yes	Yes	Yes	Yes	Yes	Also composer
1987	The Pretender	Yes	Yes	Yes	Yes	Yes	Also uncredited actor as "Onlooker at Football Field"
1988	Crime of the Age	Yes	Yes	Yes (Note: Uncredited in the film but credited on the film's poster)	Yes	Yes	
2001	Late One Night	Yes	Yes	Yes	Yes	No	

=== Television ===
Year	Film					
Year	Film	Director	Writer	Producer	Editor	Notes
2007-2014	7th Street Theater	Yes	Yes	Yes	Yes	TV series
