= Rich Christiano =

American film director and producer

- Born: October 2, 1956 (age 69)
- Education: St. John Fisher College
- Occupation: Filmmaker
- Relatives: Dave Christiano (brother)
- Website: ChristianMovies.com

Rich Christiano (born October 2, 1956) is an American filmmaker, who has directed, produced and written many Christian films. He owns Christiano Film Group, co-founded Five & Two Pictures and founded ChristianMovies.com in 1997. He is also the twin brother of Dave Christiano.

== Filmography ==
=== Film ===
Year	Title	Director	Writer	Producer	
1992	Second Glance	Yes	Yes	Yes	Also editor
1998	End of the Harvest	Yes	Yes	Yes	Also editor
2002	Time Changer	Yes	Yes	Yes	
2006	Unidentified	Yes	Yes	Yes	
2009	The Secrets of Jonathan Sperry	Yes	Yes	Yes	
2012	Amazing Love: The Story of Hosea	No	Yes	Yes	
2014	A Matter of Faith	Yes	Yes	Yes	
2019	Play the Flute	Yes	Yes	Yes	Also casting director
2022	MindReader	Yes	Yes	Yes	Also casting director

=== Short film ===
Year	Title	Director	Writer	Producer	Sound	Notes
1986	The Daylight Zone	No	No	Executive	Yes	
1987	The Pretender	No	No	Yes	Yes	
1988	Crime of the Age	No	Yes	Yes	Yes	Also co-editor
1991	The Appointment	Yes	Yes	Yes	No	

== Bibliography ==
- Christiano, Rich; Mitchell, Greg (February 1, 2001). Time Changer. White Harvest Books. ISBN 0966691148.
