= Uplifting Entertainment =

- Type: Production
- Founded: 1999
- Founder: Greg Robbins
- Headquarters: Pennsylvania; United States
- Products: Film, Television
- Website: UpliftingEntertainment.com

Uplifting Entertainment is an independent Christian production company based in Pennsylvania. It was conceived by Greg Robbins in 1999, who portrays Pastor Greg, with the purpose of "informing with delight." It was formally founded in Oregon in 2003 as a limited partnership between Robbins, director Calvin Kennedy, producer Roger Lounsbury, and writer/producer Ken Armstrong. The 2009 film, C Me Dance, was the first film created by it.

Notable productions included eight Christian entertainment series for Trinity Broadcasting Network, such as Sarah's Stories, Kid Fit, and Deputy Dingle; and a feature film, Susie's Hope (2013), about an abused pit bull puppy who later became a certified therapy dog.
