= Merrimack Valley Christian Film Festival =

- Location: Lawrence, Massachusetts
- Founded: 1993
- Language: English
- Website: http://www.christianfilmfestival.org/

The Merrimack Valley Christian Film Festival was a Christian film festival in Lawrence, Massachusetts. The festival typically drew 12,000 to 15,000 people and was held during Holy Week. Festival organizer Tom Saab said the festival was among the more popular ones in the country. Saab began the festival in 1993 at the now closed Salem Tri Cinemas. Up through 2015, the festival had been held at the Showcase Cinemas in South Lawrence. However, the Showcase Cinemas in South Lawrence closed in January 2016, which caused the Merrimack Valley Christian Film Festival to expand its scope beyond the Merrimack Valley.

The festival was renamed the Seacost Christian Film Festival, and was held for both 2016 and 2017 in Salisbury, Massachusetts at Vision Max Cinema. For unknown reasons, 2017 was the final year of the festival.
