= Christian film industry =

Aspect of Christian media

The Christian film industry is an aspect of Christian media for films containing a Christian-themed message or moral. They are often interdenominational films, but can also be films targeting a specific denomination of Christianity.

== Criteria ==
Popular mainstream studio productions of films with strong Christian messages or Biblical stories, such as Ben-Hur, The Ten Commandments, The Prince of Egypt, The Robe, Sergeant York, The Blind Side, The Book of Eli, Machine Gun Preacher, Risen, Hacksaw Ridge, and Silence, are not specifically part of the Christian film industry, being more agnostic about their audiences' religious beliefs. These films generally also have a much higher budget, production values and better-known film stars, and are received more favorably with film critics.

Many films from the Christian film industry are produced by openly confessing Christians in independent companies mainly targeting a Christian audience. This has been on the rise since the success of Sherwood Pictures whose Fireproof was the highest-grossing independent film of 2008.

== History ==
=== Beginnings ===
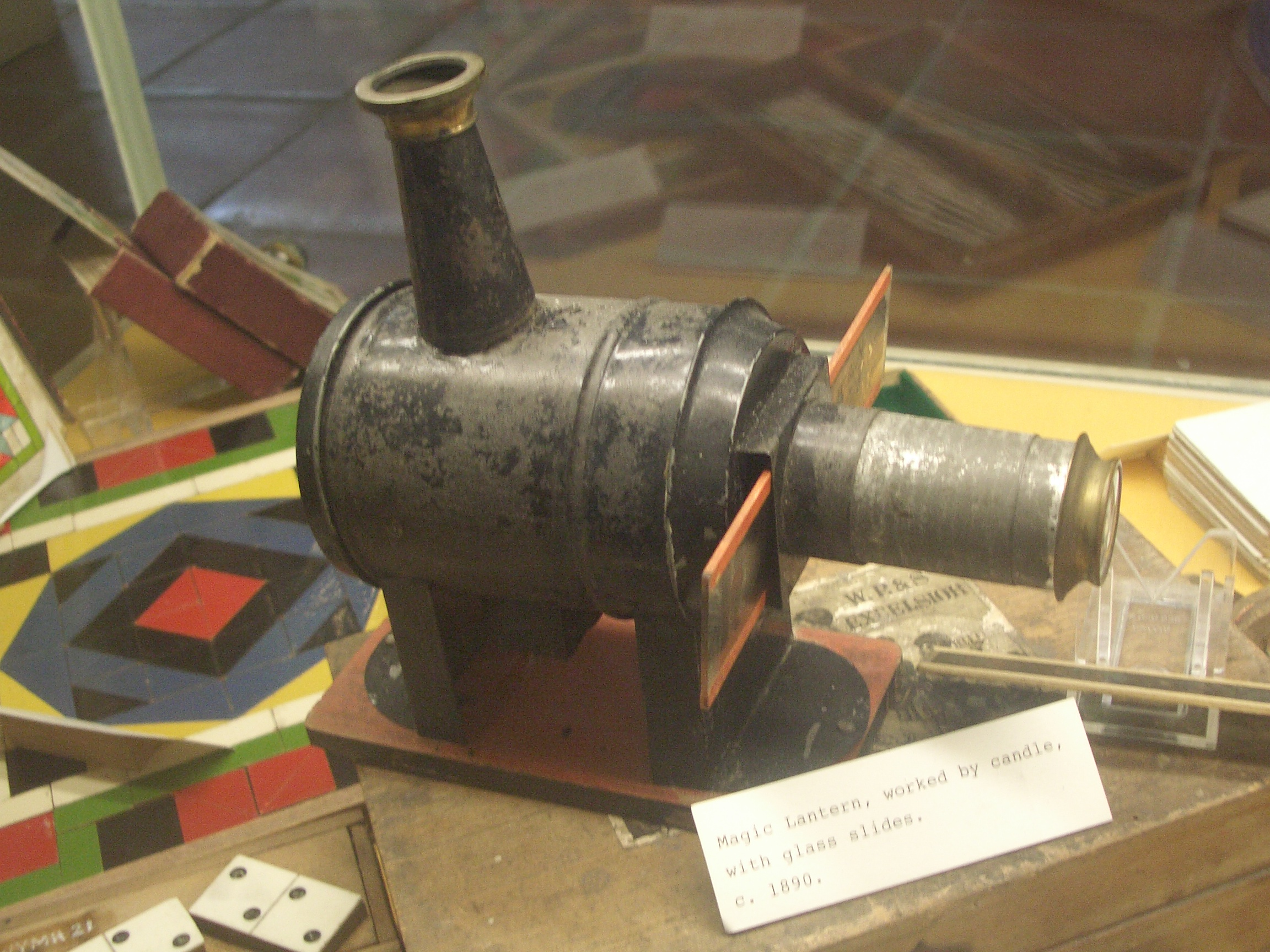
Magic lantern at the Wymondham Museum.

Catholic priest Athanasius Kircher promoted the magic lantern by publishing the book Ars Magna Lucis et Umbrae in 1646. Controversy soon followed as priests and masons used the lanterns "to persuade followers of their ability to control both the forces of darkness and enlightenment," and temperance groups used the lanterns to fight alcoholism. In the 1800s, missionaries such as David Livingstone used the lanterns to present the Gospel in Africa.

Through the years, many Christians began to utilize motion pictures for their own purposes. In 1899, Herbert Booth, as part of the Salvation Army, claimed to be the first user of film for the cause of Christianity.

=== 20th century ===
In the 1940s, Christian film libraries emerged. Harvey W. Marks started the Visual Aid Center in 1945. Around 1968, Harry Bristow launched Christian Cinema in a small theater in the Germantown area of Philadelphia, and in the early 1970s, the ministry moved to a theater in Ambler, Pennsylvania. Christian Cinema operated a movie theater that showed only Christian films, but it closed down in the mid-1990s. The growth of Christian film libraries led to the Christian Film Distributors Association (CFDA) being formed in 1974. The CFDA began holding a conference each year for Christian filmmakers and distributors. The Christian Film and Video Association (formerly the Christian Film Distribution Association) gave out Crown Awards for films that "glorify Jesus Christ."

Spencer Williams's 1941 race film The Blood of Jesus was screened in cinemas and in Black churches. The film was produced in Texas on a budget of US$5,000. To present the afterlife, Williams used scenes from a 1911 Italian film called L'Inferno that depicted souls entering Heaven and in addition to Williams, the cast was made up of amateur actors and members of Reverend R. L. Robinson's Heavenly Choir, who sang the film's gospel music score. The film's commercial success enabled Williams to direct and write additional feature films for Sack Amusement Enterprises, including two films with religious themes: Brother Martin: Servant of Jesus (1942; now considered a lost film) and Go Down Death (1944).

The 1971 Christploitation film If Footmen Tire You, What Will Horses Do? was based on a sermon by Estus Pirkle held on January 31, 1968, at Camp Zion in Myrtle Mississippi with the title "If Footmen Tire You, What Will Horses Do?". The sermon was made available by print, and Estus W. Pirkle joined with filmmaker Ron Ormond in their first collaboration, and converted the sermon into a film. The pair made a number of other films together (The Burning Hell in 1974 and The Believer's Heaven in 1977), but this first film is the team's most well-known. The film became widely distributed among churches and church camps in the 1970s.

=== Movie theaters and film festivals ===
Since The Great Commandment opened in movie theaters in 1941, many Christian filmmakers have attempted to pursue theatrical releases. World Wide Pictures was a pioneer in partnering with churches to bring Christian films to the cinema. Gateway Films (now Gateway Films/Vision Video) was "formed with the express purpose of communicating the Christian Gospel in secular motion picture theaters" and released The Cross and the Switchblade in 1972. In 1979, the Jesus film appeared in theaters across the United States. This film, based on the Gospel of Luke, was made for $6 million by Campus Crusade for Christ.

In 1993, Tom Saab launched the Merrimack Valley Christian Film Festival in Salem, New Hampshire. Each year, this festival is held during Easter week and draws an audience of thousands to a theater to watch Christian films for free. Saab's organization Christian Film Festivals of America has also presented film festivals in Salinas, California, and Orlando, Florida. In October 1999, the Voice of Pentecost Church in San Francisco hosted the first Annual WYSIWYG Film Festival. Other Christian film festivals include the San Antonio Independent Christian Film Festival, the 168 Hour Film Project, and the Redemptive Film Festival.

=== Recent years ===
ChristianCinema.com is a website that lists movies related to Christianity.

Many Christian films have been released to theaters since that time, such as The Omega Code (1999), Megiddo: The Omega Code 2 (2001), Jonah: A VeggieTales Movie (2002), The Passion of the Christ (2004), Facing the Giants (2006), The Ultimate Gift (2007), Amazing Grace (2007), the CGI animated version of The Ten Commandments (2007), Fireproof (2008), The Secrets of Jonathan Sperry (2009), To Save a Life (2010), Preacher's Kid (2010), Letters to God (2010), What If... (2010), The Grace Card (2011), Courageous (2011), October Baby (2012), Last Ounce of Courage (2012), Home Run (2013), Grace Unplugged (2013), I'm in Love with a Church Girl (2013), Son of God (2014), God's Not Dead (2014), Persecuted (2014), Old Fashioned (2015), Do You Believe? (2015), War Room (2015), Beyond the Mask (2015), I'm Not Ashamed (2016), I Can Only Imagine (2018), Breakthrough (2019), Overcomer (2019), and The Forge (2024).

In 2006, nearly 50 Christian-faith films were produced. The films grossed an average of $39 million. All five of the major Hollywood studios have created marketing departments to target the growing demand for faith-based and family fare. Movieguide publisher Ted Baehr said, "There is competition for the Christian audience now that there hasn't been before. I thought at some point it would level off, but so far it's getting bigger and bigger. It's more than I could have possibly imagined. One of the audiences that has become stable and even grown for books, music and movies is the Christian audience."

The proliferation of Christian movies and Christian films has led to the establishment of many online retailers that focus their business exclusively on the sale and distribution of Christian movies and family-friendly films such as Parables.tv, Exploration Films based in Monument, Colorado, FishFlix.com, ChristianCinema.com and ChristianMovies.com. Parables TV also provides streaming and linear TV. In 2013, FishFlix.com opened the first ever DVD store devoted completely to Christian DVDs in Tulsa, Oklahoma.

The 2014 film God's Not Dead is one of the most successful independent Christian films of all time and the 2015 film War Room became a box office number-one film.

== Christian film in Africa ==
=== South Africa ===
Faith-based, family-values films are popular in South Africa due to its predominantly Christian audience, including Faith Like Potatoes, a 2006 biopic of farmer-turned-preacher Angus Buchan.

=== Nigeria ===
Nigerian Christians are actively contributing to the booming Nigerian film industry known as Nollywood. Christian films make up about 20% of Nigerian films. Independent companies, ministries, and large churches producing hundreds of Christian films often see themselves as an alternative to Nollywood. Nevertheless, they have also participated in mainstream success and many of these films appear on state television channels.

The Redeemed Christian Church of God founded Dove Studios, its studio became the country's biggest movie studio and distributor. More than 50,000 copies of their movies were sold before April 2006. The Gospel Film Festival (GOFESTIVAL) is also a major Nigerian film attraction.

== See also ==
- The Bible in film
- Christian Film Database
- List of Christian films
- List of Christian film production companies
- Independent film
  - Indiewood
