= Ashley Bratcher =

American actress and activist

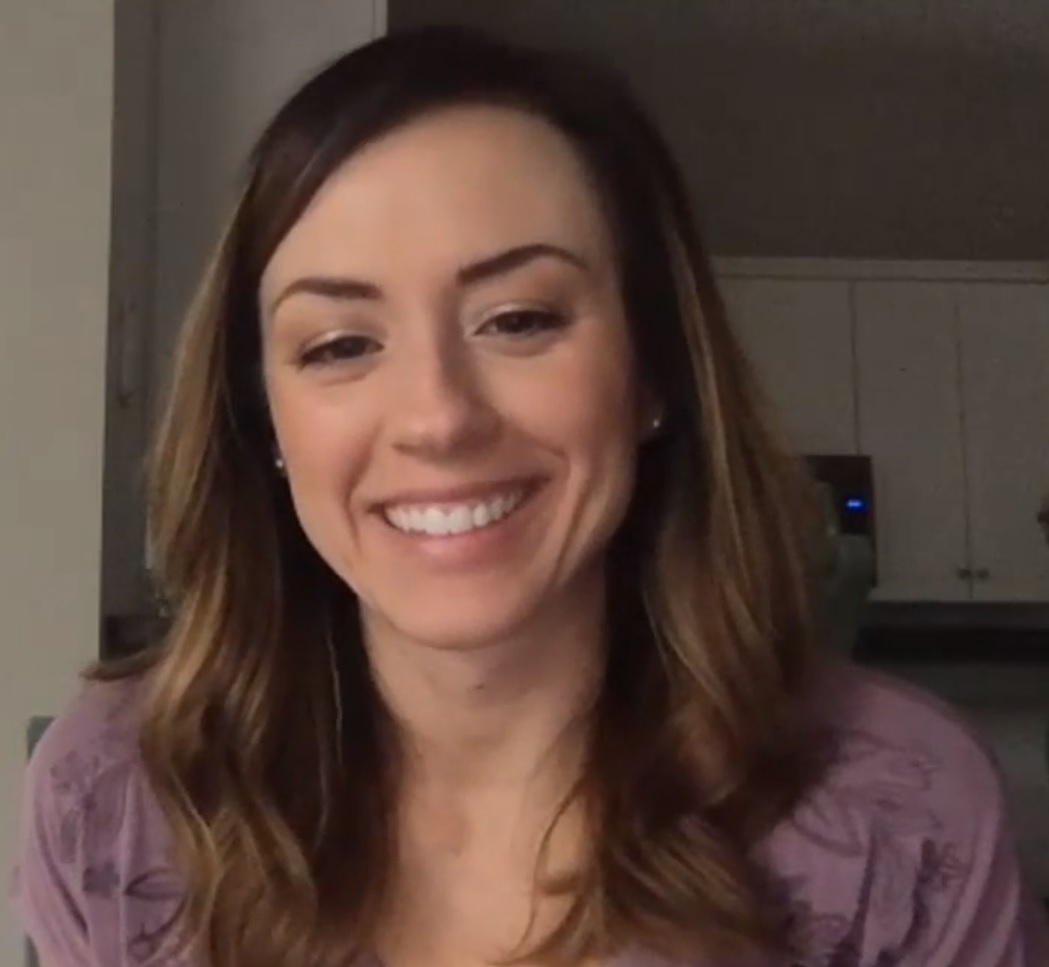
- Bratcher in 2019
- Born: North Carolina, U.S.
- Occupation: Actress
- Years active: 2012–present
- Known for: Unplanned (2019)
- Spouse: David Bratcher (m. 2010)
- Children: 1

Ashley Bratcher is an actress who has starred in Christian films in the U.S. She portrayed anti-abortion activist Abby Johnson in the 2019 film Unplanned.

== Early life ==
Bratcher was born in North Carolina. She grew up in a mobile home and considers Georgia her home state. Ashley began acting on stage at age 16, and attended Campbell University where she graduated with honors. She briefly worked as a middle school teacher before becoming a full-time actress.

== Career ==
After acting in several short films and minor roles, in 2015 Bratcher starred as the female lead of Christian romance film Princess Cut. She continued to act in several other faith-based films, such as War Room and 90 Minutes in Heaven. In 2018, she was approached for the lead role for Unplanned, a drama about the life of Abby Johnson, a former Planned Parenthood director who became an anti-abortion activist. After learning about Abby's testimony, Bratcher was deeply moved and quickly accepted the role.Others discouraged her from working with the film out of concern that she would be blacklisted, but Bratcher decided that the role was "worth it". The cast and crew commended her on her commitment to the role, and Abby Johnson complimented Bratcher on accurately portraying her.

== Personal life ==
=== Family and faith ===
On April 23, 2010, Bratcher married her high school sweetheart David Bratcher after seven years of dating. They have one child together, a son. The family resides in Georgia. According to Bratcher, her son was the result of an unintended pregnancy and she and family were forced to rely on WIC and Medicaid in order to get by. She also reported initial feelings of shame associated with her pregnancy but now credits the birth of her son with making her a better person and deepening her devotion to Christianity.

=== Anti-abortion efforts ===
Shortly before the release of Unplanned, Bratcher told the media that after she had started working on the movie, her mother told Bratcher that she became pregnant with Bratcher at 19 years old and had pawned a family heirloom in order to cover the cost of an abortion but ultimately changed her mind, resulting in Bratcher's birth.

Since the release of Unplanned, she has spoken at crisis pregnancy centers nationwide. After the release of Unplanned, Bratcher started the Unplanned Movie Scholarship to offer scholarships to women facing unplanned pregnancies.

She also voiced her support of the Living Infants Fairness Equality (LIFE) Act (Georgia HB481), a legislative effort that would ban abortion after six weeks of pregnancy.

=== Hobbies ===
Bratcher is a competitive practitioner of Brazilian jiu-jitsu, which she sees as an avenue of personal growth.

== Filmography ==
=== Film ===
Year	Title	Role	Notes
2012	Wrinkle	Jenny	Short
2013	Safe Haven	Bus Passenger	
2013	Fifty Shades of Olivia!	Olivia Wildheart	Short
2013	The Perfect Summer	Surfer	
2013	Are You Here	Suburbanite	
2013	Don't Know Yet	Football Player	
2013	Mean Green	Kathy	Short
2013	The Dempsey Sisters	New Assistant	
2014	Southern Comfort	Abigail Stansbury	
2014	The Most Beautiful Girl in the World	Veronica Anderson	Short
2014	Mitosis	Vivian	Short
2015	Princess Cut	Grace Anderson	
2015	War Room	Lindsay	
2015	90 Minutes in Heaven	Susan Long	
2015	If	Sister	Short
2015	Badge of Faith	Rebecca	
2016	Nico	Delilah	Short
2016	Yesterday's Gone	Rachel	Short
2016	#FollowFriday	Vivian Weiss	TV movie
2016	Apricity	Alex	Short
2017	Extraordinary	20's Nancy	
2017	New Chapters	Sarah	Short
2019	Unplanned	Abby Johnson	
2019	A Walk with Grace	Grace	
2021	Princess Cut 2: Hearts on Fire	Grace Masters	
2021	Love Map	Avery	TV movie
2022	Game Changer	Jen Everette	
2024	Finding Faith	Victoria	

=== Television ===
Year	Title	Role	Notes
2014	Your Worst Nightmare	Lisa Brown	Episode: "Fight or Flight"
2015	Secrets and Lies	Woman (Dave's Date)	Episode: "Brother's Keeper"
2016	A Haunting	Claire	Episode: "Love Curse"
2017	Good Behavior	Party Girl #1	Episode: "Don't Thank God, Thank Me"
2019-21	Vindication	Marissa	Guest: Season 1, Recurring Cast: Season 2
2020	The Encounter	Sharon	Episode: "The Gift"
