= The Mole (American TV series) season 3 =

The Mole
- Season 3
- Region 1 DVD cover
- Presented by: Ahmad Rashad
- No. of contestants: 7
- Winner: Kathy Griffin
- Runner-up: Erik von Detten
- Location: Big Island, Hawaii
- The Mole: Frederique van der Wal
- No. of episodes: 6

Release
- Original network: ABC
- Original release: January 8 – February 12, 2003

Season chronology
- ← Previous; Season 2 Next → Season 4

Celebrity Mole: Hawaii is the third season (and first Celebrity Edition) of the American version of The Mole and aired from January 8 to February 12, 2003. It was filmed on the Big Island of Hawaii in October 2002. On December 17, 2002, a fire on the second floor of the Hollywood Center Studios in Los Angeles caused the offices of Stone Stanley Entertainment to be flooded with water from sprinklers and fire hoses. All of the tapes from the series were found soaked in 18 inches of water, but they were all recovered, dried out, and ultimately were unharmed.

Seven celebrities competed in physical and mental challenges while trying to determine who among them had been hired to sabotage their efforts to earn money from these challenges. In the end, model Frederique van der Wal was unmasked as the mole and comedian Kathy Griffin took home the $233,000 grand prize. In contrast with celebrity editions of some reality and game shows, each contestant played for his or her own benefit rather than for charity.

This season was presented by Ahmad Rashad.

Celebrity Mole Hawaii was most recently reran as a marathon on Fox Reality on March 1, 2008.

== Celebrity contestants ==
- Corbin Bernsen (actor; Major League, L.A. Law)
- Erik von Detten (actor; The Princess Diaries, Dinotopia)
- Frederique van der Wal (model; Victoria's Secret)
- Kathy Griffin (comedian, actress; Suddenly Susan)
- Kim Coles (actress; Living Single, In Living Color)
- Michael Boatman (actor; Arli$$, Spin City)
- Stephen Baldwin (actor; The Usual Suspects, The Flintstones in Viva Rock Vegas)

Queen Latifah was originally part of the cast but dropped out shortly before filming. Griffin claimed she agreed to do the show because Latifah was on it, but could not drop out after Latifah did. Griffin also claimed she persuaded producers that the celebrity contestant winner should get to keep the winnings, rather than charity.

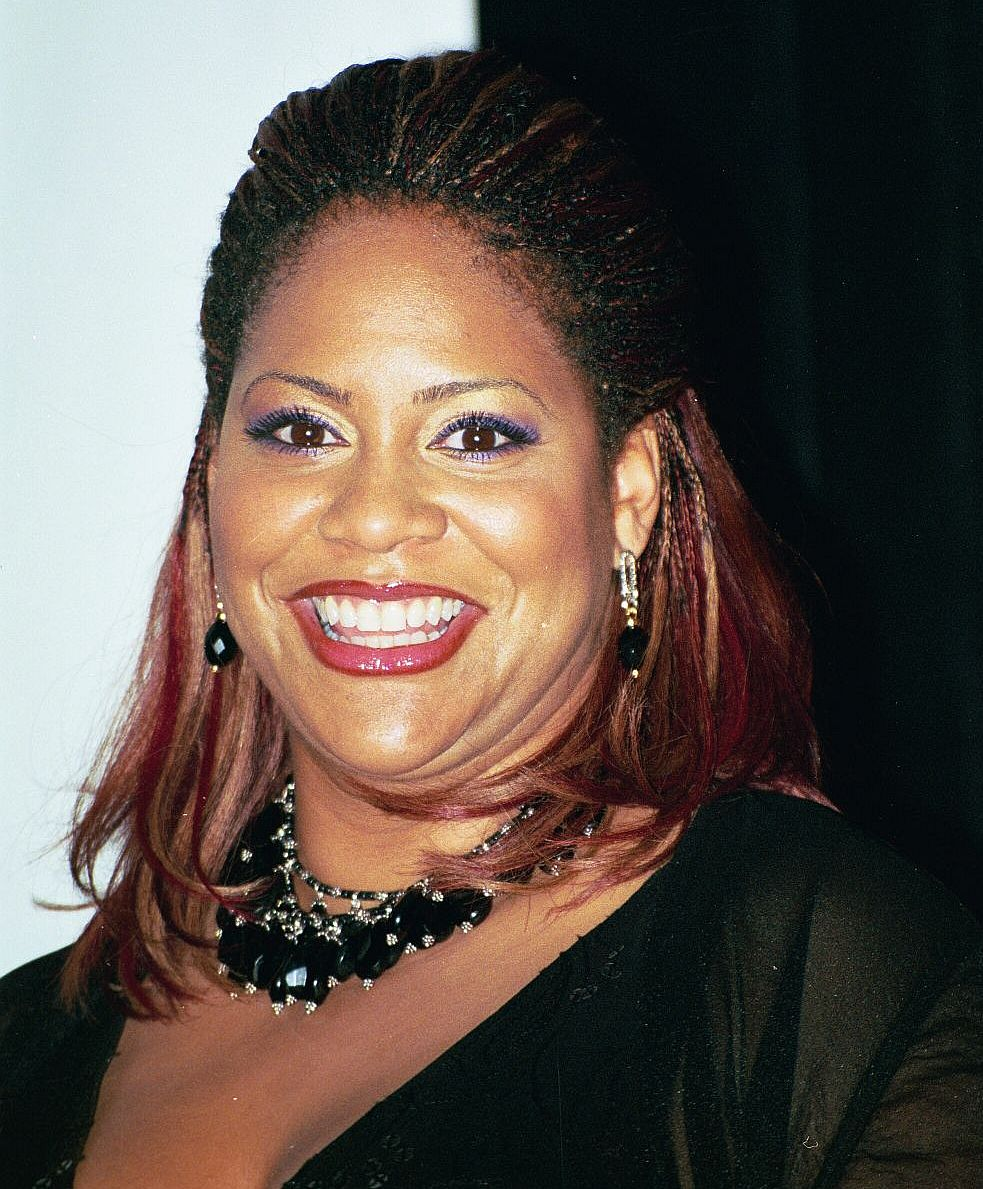
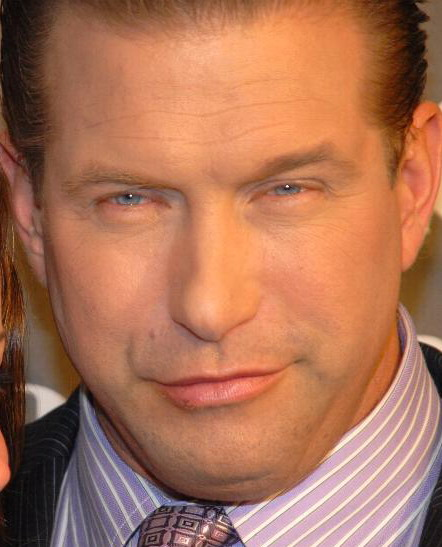
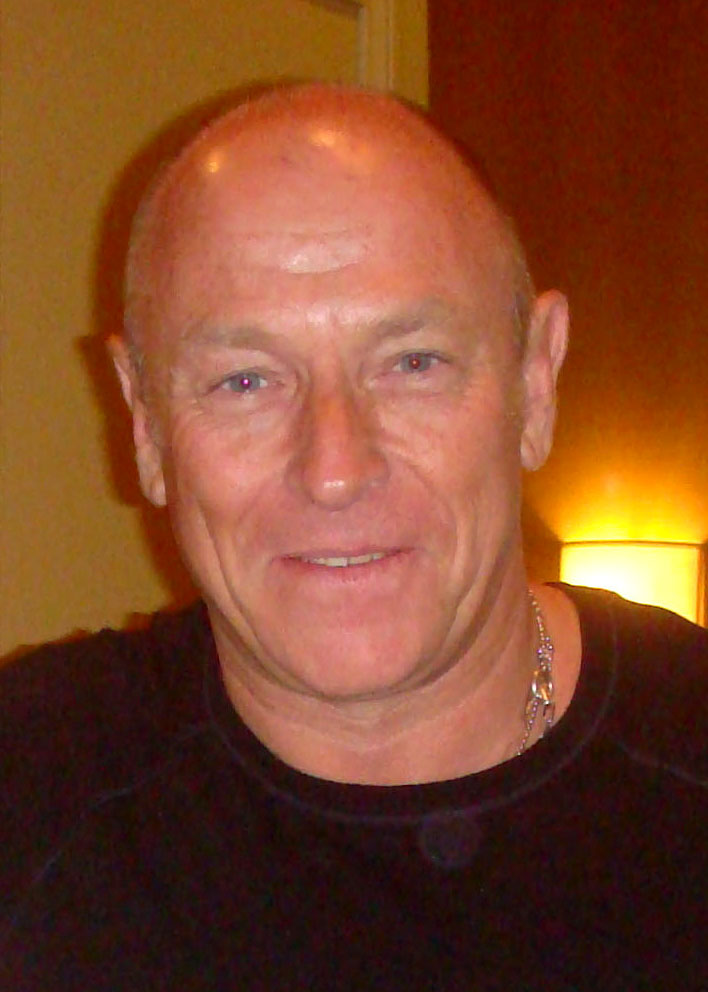
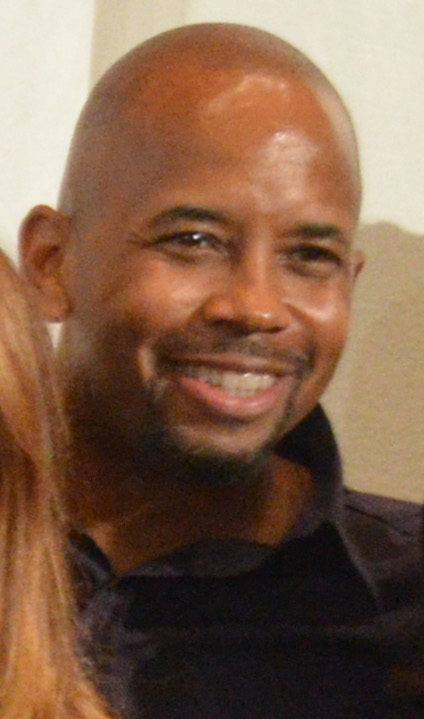
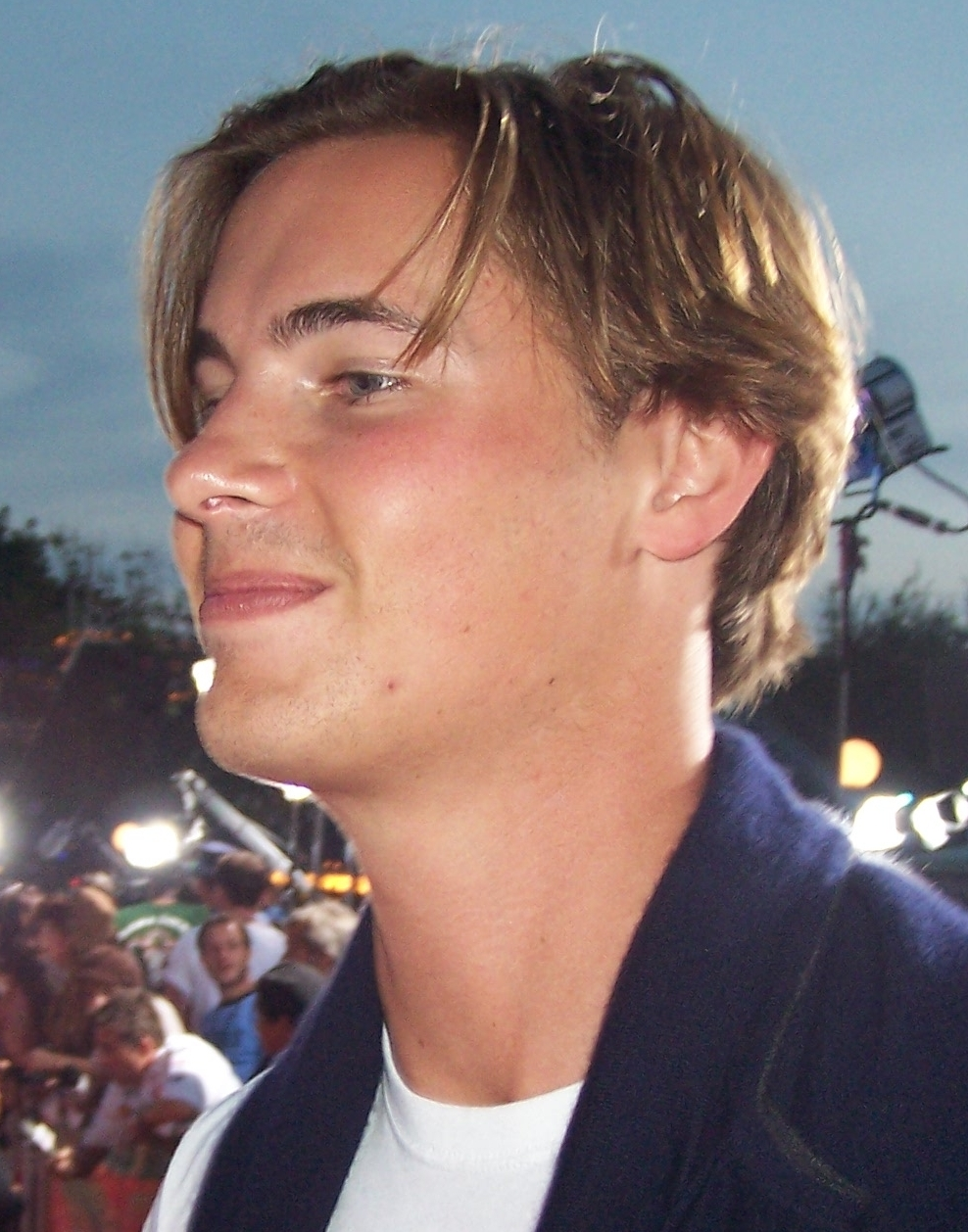
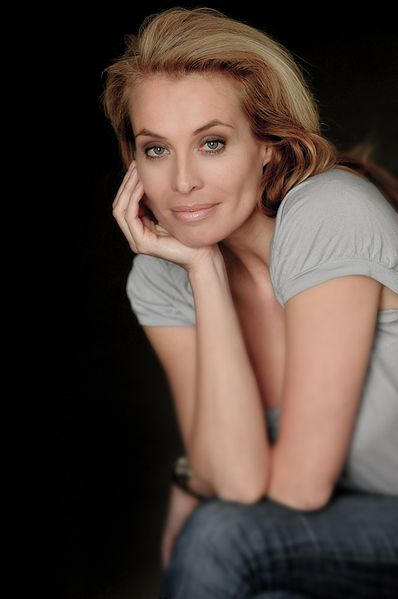
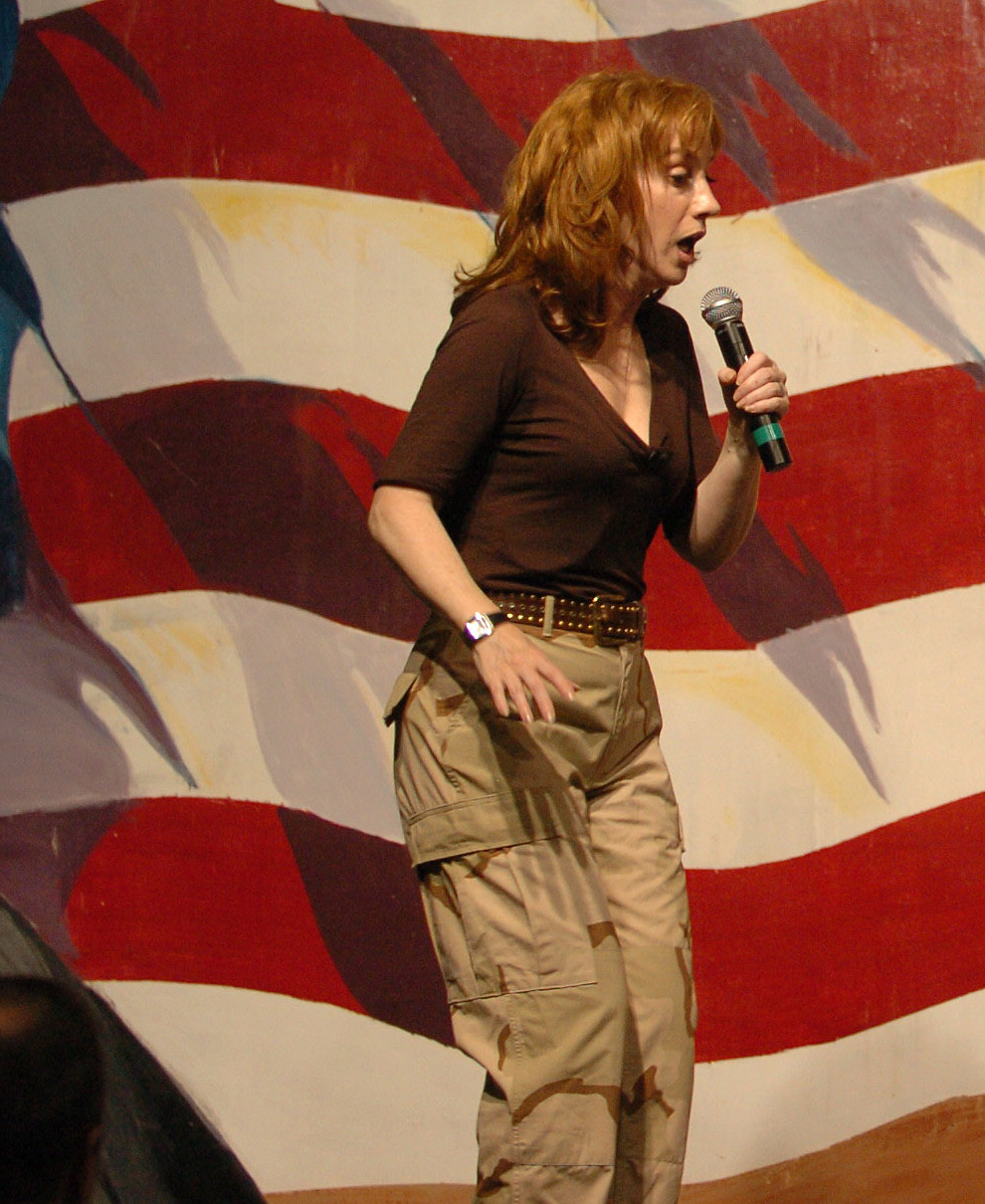
From left to right: Kim Coles, Stephen Baldwin, Corbin Bernsen, Michael Boatman, Erik von Detten, Frederique van der Wal, and Kathy Griffin

== Execution chart ==
Color key:

Winner
The Mole
Runner-up
Earned or claimed exemption
Tied for lowest score
Executed

	Episode 1	Episode 2	Episode 3	Episode 4	Episode 6 Final
Quiz	1	2	3	4	5
Starting prize pot	$0	$50,000	$42,000	$151,000	$151,000
Money earned	$50,000	$17,000	$109,000	$0	$82,000
Penalties	(none)	-$25,000	(none)		
Total prize pot	$50,000	$42,000	$151,000	$151,000	$233,000
Kathy	Safe	Safe	Safe	Safe	Winner (Episode 6)
Frederique	Safe	Safe	Safe	Safe	The Mole (Episode 6)
Erik	Safe	Safe	Safe	Exempt	Runner-up (Episode 6)
Michael	Safe	Safe	Safe	Executed	Executed (Episode 4)
Corbin	Safe	Safe	Executed	Executed (Episode 3)	
Stephen	Exempt	Executed	Executed (Episode 2)		
Kim	Executed	Executed (Episode 1)			
Exemptions	Stephen	Not earned	~~Erik~~ (declined)	Erik	(none)
Executed	Kim; Lowest score	Stephen; Slowest time	Corbin; Slowest time	Michael; Second-lowest score	Frederique; The Mole
Executed	Kim; Lowest score	Stephen; Slowest time	Corbin; Slowest time	Michael; Second-lowest score	Erik; Lowest score
Executed	Kim; Lowest score	Stephen; Slowest time	Corbin; Slowest time	Michael; Second-lowest score	Kathy; Highest score

== Episodes ==
=== Episode 1 ===
Episode 1 recapOriginal airdate: January 8, 2003
Mission	Money earned	Possible earnings
On The Line	$20,000	$30,000
Baa Baa Black Jack	$30,000	$50,000
Current Pot	$50,000	$80,000

Exemptions
Stephen	Corralled the Mole sheep

Execution
Kim	1st player executed

On The Line: The group is split up into two groups: four strong players, and three who would like to hang out. A player from the hang out group will be on a zip line and have to grab a bucket, fill it at the waterfall and empty it into a bigger bucket, which when filled with enough water will lift a money bag worth $10,000. The strong players will be in four positions: two operate a crank that moves the hanging player back and forth; one operates a joystick that moves the player up and down; and the other will be a spotter giving instructions to the other three strong players. The first hanger has six minutes to complete the task, while the two other hanging players will have to beat the previous best time in order to add money. The strong players rotate positions for each turn. Up to $30,000 can be added to the pot in this game.

Baa Baa Black Jack: The players form three groups of two, leaving one person out of the first part of the game. Every sheep has a cape with a card value on it. For each group that can wrangle two sheep into the group's pen in three minutes and beat Ahmad's hand, two cards picked from regular cards by the left out player, $5,000 is added. The group with the best hand can add an additional $10,000 by beating Ahmad's hand a second time. Finally, the player who was left out can earn an exemption and double the money earned from this game if he can corral the Mole sheep, a sheep with a black cape, into one of the pens in under three minutes. However, if he fails, all the money is lost from this game. In this game, up to $50,000 can be added to the pot.

=== Episode 2 ===
Episode 2 recapOriginal airdate: January 15, 2003
Mission	Money earned	Possible earnings
Take This Job	$17,000	$24,000
Underwater Charades	$0	$25,000
Exemption Dinner	-$25,000	$25,000
Current Pot	$42,000	$154,000

Exemptions
None	Unable to decide in Exemption Dinner

Execution
Stephen	2nd player executed (tie quiz score, slowest time)

Take This Job: The players are split into three groups of two: flight attendants, short order cooks, and lifeguards. The flight attendants are to wipe off grease on the front panel while a plane does tricks in the air. The short order cooks are to walk across hot rocks and retrieve a chicken. The lifeguards' job is to jump into a lagoon. The players will guess on the performance of the other group's members. For each correct guess, $1,000 will be added, making this game worth $24,000.

Underwater Charades: The players form three groups of two: charade players, gravediggers and players in a submarine. The charade players are given five cards which have the titles of movies or television shows in which a character dies. The submarine group must figure out the title. Once they do, they report the title to the gravediggers, who will dig up a coffin of the actor whose character died. Inside one of the coffins is $25,000. If the gravediggers find this coffin, that money will be added to the pot.

Exemption Dinner: The group must unanimously decide who will be given an exemption in this episode. If they do that, $25,000 will be added to the pot. However, if they can not reach an agreement, $25,000 will be taken out of the pot.

=== Episode 3 ===
Episode 3 recapOriginal airdate: January 22, 2003
Mission	Money earned	Possible earnings
Offshore Account	$60,000	$60,000
Looky Looky Hot Pepper	$49,000	$75,000
Current Pot	$151,000	$263,000

Exemptions
None	Erik gave back exemption in Offshore Account

Execution
Corbin	3rd player executed (tie quiz score, slower time)

Offshore Account: Four players must build a raft out of a pile of junk and row it to the money offshore in under thirty minutes to win $30,000. The person left out is told to make smoothies. The smoothie making player is given an offer to use a metal detector to find $15 worth of coins and rent a kayak to grab the flag on the offshore money. If the player does this, he gains an exemption and no money goes into the pot. However, if the player gives back the exemption, $60,000 will be added.

Looky Looky Hot Pepper Each player is asked a pop culture question and chooses a mouse which moves to one of six areas marked with numbers 1-6. This decides what type of hot pepper a player must eat, 6 being the hottest. If the player answers correctly, he/she can pass the pepper off to someone else. However, if the player is wrong, he/she must take a bite out of the pepper, chew it, show the group, and swallow it to add money. Each pepper is worth $10,000. A glass of milk can be bought for $1,000 if a player's mouth becomes too hot. Afterwards, an additional $25,000 would be added if everyone eats another pepper, which turned out to be a non-spicy tomato pepper.

=== Episode 4 ===
Episode 4 recapOriginal airdate: January 29, 2003
Mission	Money earned	Possible earnings
Hulapalooza	$0	$30,000
Exemption Game	$0	$20,000
Current Pot	$151,000	$313,000

Exemptions
Erik	Completed memory game

Execution
Michael	4th player executed

Hulapalooza: The remaining male contestants must perform the hula to the song "Tiny Bubbles" while the remaining female contestants surf. The surfers have thirty minutes to each stand on their board for five seconds while the males must keep dancing during this time. $20,000 will be added if the groups are successful. Afterwards, Erik was given an offer to stand on the surfboard for twenty seconds to add $10,000 to the group pot.

Exemption Game: The players form two groups and compete against each other for the final exemption. The first round features two brain teasers. The group that answers them the fastest goes on to the second round. There the two players answer ten multiple choice questions. The player who correctly answers the questions the fastest is given the chance at the final exemption by playing a memory game with a deck of cards. 52 cards are in front of the contestant face down, and the player can only pick two at a time. The other three players must find him before he matches the 26 pairs. This prevents him from getting the exemption and earns $20,000 for the pot.

=== Episode 5 ===
Episode 5 recapOriginal airdate: February 5, 2003
Mission	Money earned	Possible earnings
Three Questions	$10,000	$30,000
It Takes a Thief	$72,000	$75,000
Final Pot	$233,000	$418,000

Three Questions: Each player filled out a questionnaire about the other two players. Each player took turns hiding in the forest while the other two searched for him/her by predicting how the player answered three of the questions. If the duo answered all three questions right, the group earned $10,000. A possible $30,000 was available in this game.

It Takes a Thief: The players take part in a scavenger hunt by following clues that can only be read by a black light. These clues ultimately lead to three numbers. Once the players find the numbers, they have to correctly guess the combination to open a safe. Once opened, the safe gives the players one final clue to find the money. If the players are stuck, they can buy an additional clue for $1,000. Up to $75,000 could be added to the pot in this game.

The remaining players took the final quiz, and the winner was to be revealed the following week.

=== Episode 6 ===
The final episode revealed Kathy as the winner and Frederique as the Mole. To reveal the results, the players were put behind three locked doors and placed their hand on a scanner. The first player to come out was the winner and the second was the Mole.

In this episode it was revealed that both Kathy and Erik had tied for the lowest score with Stephen on the second quiz. Also, Kathy and Corbin had the low score in the third quiz. Since Stephen and Corbin were slower in the respective quizzes, they were executed. Furthermore, had it not been for the exemption in Episode 4, Erik would have been executed, not Michael.

The remainder of the episode was focused on the ways the Mole sabotaged games and explaining the hidden clues that pointed to the Mole's identity to the viewers.

== Mole sabotage ==
On The Line: As one of the players that wanted to "hang out," Frederique used her accent and pretended to have slight difficulty with English. She stalled the strong players with her poor directions. When it came to getting the water into the bigger bucket, she struggled pouring, wasting time and costing the group $10,000. To avoid any suspicion, she quickly blamed Corbin for not listening to her.

Underwater Charades: Despite the group finding four out of the five coffins, Frederique stalled on the final charade. She quickly figured out the answer to the last charade was "American Beauty", but purposely did not tell Stephen. The money was in the coffin that was not found, keeping $25,000 out of the pot. Suspicion was eased on her when Erik knew the last coffin was empty, but still said to open it.

Offshore Account: Frederique was supposed to be the player who looked good on the beach and be given the exemption offer. Since Erik was the one on the beach, Frederique used the chaos of the game to loosen some knots on the raft. Despite this, Erik gave back the exemption, earning $60,000 for the pot.

Looky Looky Hot Pepper: At this time, Frederique figured the players suspected Michael as the Mole. When it came time to eat the $25,000 peppers, she refused to, keeping that money out of the pot. Despite this, no one chose her as the Mole on the next quiz.

Hulapalooza: Frederique knew Kathy was not an athletic person and would not be able to get on the surfboard, so she tried her hardest in this game. Kathy was unsuccessful in surfing for five seconds, which kept the $20,000 out of the pot and shifted suspicions to Kathy.

Exemption Game: Frederique knew where Erik was playing the game. So she ran ahead of the others and slowed down to waste time. Her goal was to arrive just after Erik completed the game. She found Erik a minute after he completed the memory game.

It Takes a Thief: At this point, Frederique figured the other two players were on to her, so she decided not to try to sabotage the game. The other two players were either trying to convince the other that he/she was the Mole, or as she states, "...it was just a sad moment for both.". They did win the game, but Frederique put doubt in their minds before the final execution.

In all, Frederique cost the group $80,000. No one picked her on the quiz until the final quiz, making her the stealthiest mole to date among the U.S. series.

== Hidden clues ==
There were hidden clues throughout the season meant for the viewers. The clues ranged from hints at Frederique's background while others were codes that when deciphered would point to the Mole's identity.

Episode Opening: When Ahmad says, "But someone is being paid to deceive the others and sabotage the games,” Frederique is only player (besides the helicopter operator) visible in the helicopter. This pointed out that Frederique is the "saboteur".

Episode 1:

- Baa Baa Black Jack: In the preview to the game before the commercials, Ahmad says, "It's Wild Wild West, Mole style." This is referring to the movie Wild Wild West where Frederique played the role Amazonia.

Episode 2:

- Take This Job: When Corbin is making his predictions on whether the other players would do their jobs during the game, a plane registration number is behind him: VS-CMH03. The code stood for Victoria's Secret: Celebrity Mole Hawaii 2003. This is a reference to Frederique's profession as a supermodel.

Episode 3:

- Offshore Account: As Frederique walks out of the ocean, a red, white, and blue inflatable dolphin is shown. When rotated 90 degrees, this gives the flag of the Netherlands, Frederique's home country.

Episode 5:

- It Takes a Thief: There were storage bins in the walk-in cooler where Kathy grabbed a watermelon. The bins were labeled Fruits, Vegetables, Dairy, Water, and Meat. The first letters of each word stand for Frederique Van Der Wal, Mole.
