= Kim Coles =

American actress and comedian

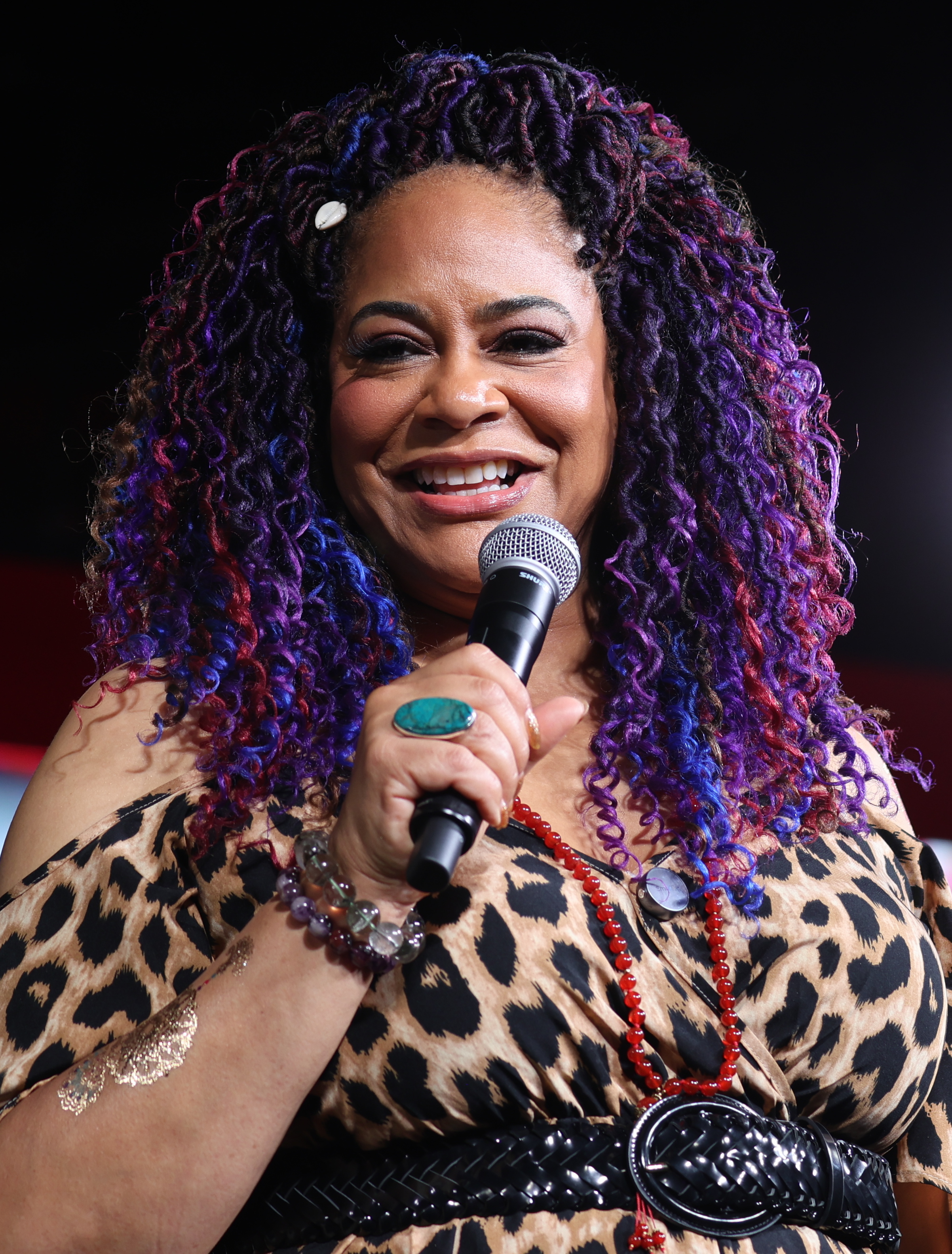
- Coles in 2025
- Born: Kimberly Coles; January 11, 1962 (age 64); New York City, U.S.
- Education: North Carolina Central University
- Occupations: Actress; comedian; game show host
- Years active: 1988–present
- Known for: Synclaire James – Living Single
- Spouse(s): Aton Edwards (m. 1985; div. 1995) Reggie Mckiver (m. 2015; div. 2019)

Kimberly Coles (born January 11, 1962) is an American actress and comedian. She is known for her roles as an original cast member on the variety show In Living Color (1990–1991) and as Synclaire James-Jones on the sitcom Living Single (1993–1998), which both aired on Fox. She was the host of BET's game show Pay It Off in 2009. With Erika Alexander, Kim currently cohosts and coproduces the Reliving Single podcast on YouTube and other podcast sites.

== Early life ==
Coles was born in Brooklyn, New York City. Her father was an Episcopal priest. and was the first black Dean of the Pratt Institute. She attended a private Lutheran school and was quiet and studious until high school, when her sense of humor emerged. She graduated from Brooklyn Technical High School in 1980.

In 1984 Coles was first runner-up among 45 contestants in the first Big Beautiful Woman Fashion and Beauty Pageant in Atlantic City, sponsored by Big Beautiful Woman Magazine. That development led to a change in plans for Coles, who was in college and was considering a career in cultural anthropology. She began modeling for Lane Bryant and made Burger King commercials.

== Career ==
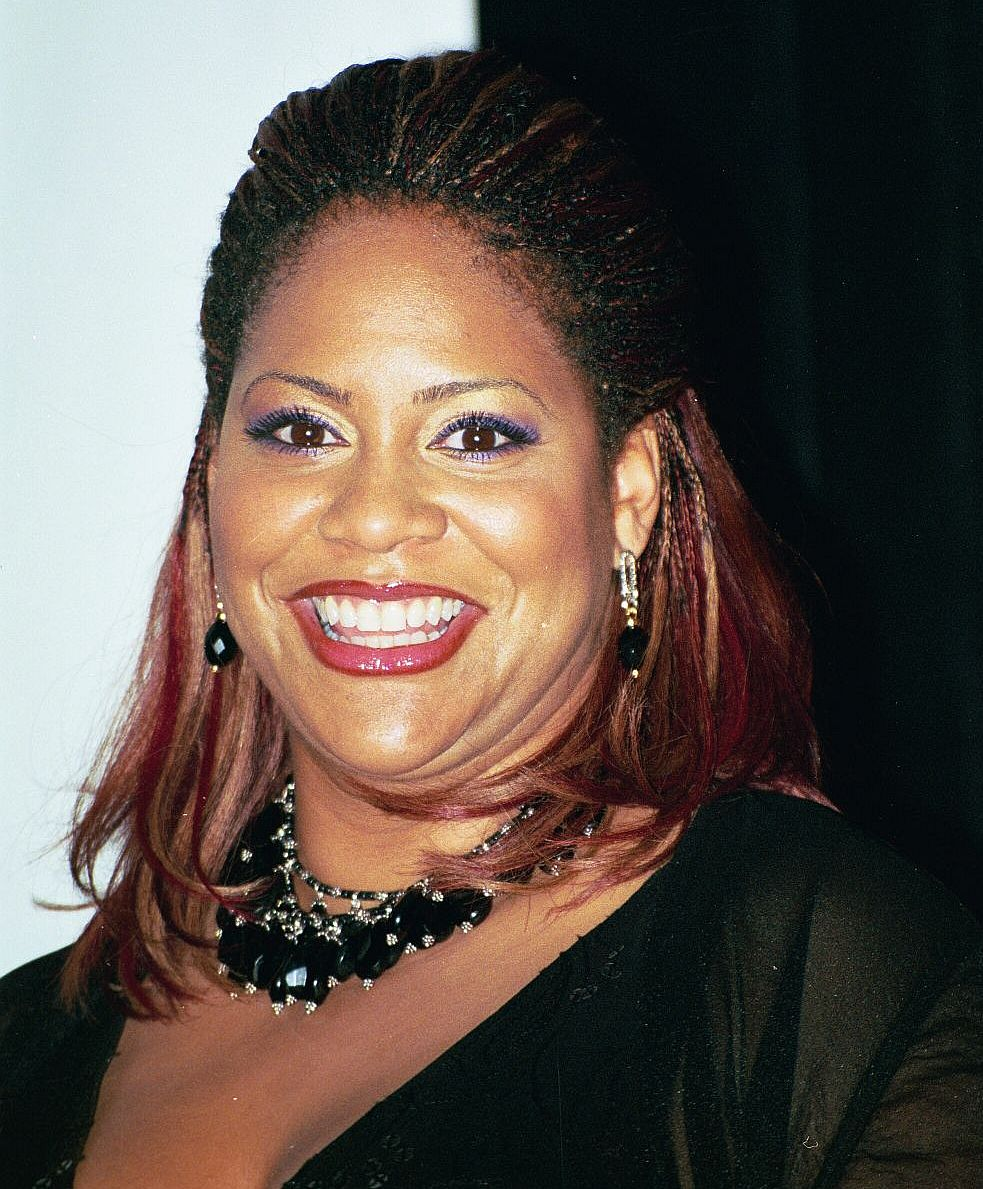
Coles in 1998

Encouraged by the audience's response to her comedy sketch at the beauty pageant, Coles began her career in stand-up comedy in 1984. "Once I saw the reaction of the audience," she said, "I knew this was what I wanted to do." After a nightclub owner told her that she should gain 40 pounds for a "Nell Carter look", she instead changed her eating habits and began exercising, losing 50 pounds in five months.

Coles has appeared on many television shows, including Frasier ("Dr." Mary Thomas), Six Feet Under, Celebrity Mole, Living Single and The Geena Davis Show. Early in her career, she appeared as one of the hosts of It's Showtime at the Apollo. She was an original cast member on the sketch comedy series In Living Color that appeared on the FOX network. After the first season, Coles was informed by a phone call from her agent that she had been fired. Coles later learned Keenen Ivory Wayans did not think she was versatile enough, which she disagreed with, stating: "How could I show my versatility if I wasn’t able to perform?", describing Wayans as sometimes overlooking her for parts in sketches.

After leaving "In Living Color", she then got the role as Synclaire James on Living Single and won an NAACP Image Award for Outstanding Actress in a Comedy Series. She appeared as the mother of Spirit on UPN's One on One. Coles is a published author; her book is called I'm Free But It Will Cost You, ISBN 978-0-7868-8322-6, Hyperion Books, 1998.

Coles appeared on Celebrity Mole: Hawaii and was the first contestant to be eliminated. At the reunion of the show, she was one of two celebrities (the other was Michael Boatman) to correctly guess that Frederique van der Wal was the series' saboteur, Kathy Griffin was the winner, and Erik von Detten was the runner-up. Coles also joined other celebrities for a weight loss journey on the VH-1 reality show, Celebrity Fit Club. After 16 weeks, she lost a total of 24 lbs, and dropping nearly 4 percentage points in body fat, going from 34.7% to 31%. She accomplished this with the help of her team, "Ralphie's Angels". She lost 10.2% of her body weight, dropping down to 196 lbs.

Coles was a regular panelist on the 2000 revival of To Tell the Truth during its second season. She was also featured as a guest host on two episodes of The View. Coles was a co-host of the syndicated daytime television show In The Loop With iVillage alongside The Apprentice winner Bill Rancic and fellow season one contestant Ereka Vetrini. She has recently joined the cast of 10 Items or Less on TBS.

On September 30, 2009, she hosted the game show Pay It Off, lasted for one season on BET, which is similar to Debt. In 2010, she appeared on RuPaul's Drag Race. She appeared in an episode of TV One's series "Life After" in late 2011.

Coles has also performed as a stand-up comedian, with some of her material dealing with her struggle with being overweight at times.

== Personal life ==
Coles married Reggie Mckiver, a former SWAT police officer, in the Dominican Republic in 2015.

== Filmography ==
=== Film ===
Year	Title	Role	Notes
1991	Strictly Business	Millicent	
2005	Kids in America	Loretta Jenkins	
2009	Wig	Cacey	Short
2019	Love Is Not Enough	Angela	
2021	A Jenkins Family Christmas	Beverly	
2022	A Marriage Made in Heaven	Angela Tucker	
2025	Hungry	Sharlyne	
2025	Love, Danielle	Ellen	

=== Television ===
Year	Title	Role	Notes
1988–1991	Showtime at the Apollo	Herself	Recurring Guest
1990	In Living Color	Herself/Cast Member	Main Cast: Season 1
1992–1994	An Evening at the Improv	Herself	Episode: "Episode #9.18" & "#13.13"
1993	Martin	Bonquisha	Episode: "Baby You Can Drive My Car"
1993–1998	Living Single	Synclaire James-Jones	Main Cast
1995	The Crew	Synclaire James	Episode: "The Worst Noel"
1996	MADtv	Herself	Episode: "Episode #1.17" & "#2.3"
1996	The Show	Deandra	Episode: "Deandra and Them"
1999	New Attitudes	Herself/Host	Main Host
1999	Hollywood Squares	Herself/Panelist	Recurring Panelist
2000	Frasier	Dr. Mary Thomas	Guest Cast: Seasons 7–8
2000–2001	The Geena Davis Show	Judy Owens	Main Cast
2001	The Test	Herself/Panelist	Episode: "The Self-Respect Test"
2001	Headliners & Legends with Matt Lauer	Herself	Episode: "Halle Berry"
2001	Biography	Herself	Episode: "Kim Fields: A Little Somethin' Somethin'"
2001	Weakest Link	Herself	Episode: "Comedians #3 Special"
2002	Six Feet Under	Dolores	Episode: "The Liar and the Whore"
2002–2003	Pyramid	Herself/Celebrity Contestant	Recurring Guest
2002–2004	One on One	Leilani Jones	Recurring Cast: Season 2 & 4, Guest: Season 3
2003	The Mole	Herself	Contestant: Season 3
2003	Star Search	Herself/Guest Judge	Episode: "The One with Living Single Star Kim Coles"
2003	The Parkers	Florence	Episode: "That's What Friends Are For"
2003–2004	Coming to the Stage	Herself/Judge	Main Judge
2004	Steve Harvey's Big Time Challenge	Herself	Episode: "Episode #2.11"
2004	My Wife and Kids	Childcare Instructor	Episode: "Childcare Class"
2005	Black in the 80s	Herself	Recurring Guest
2005	Celebrity Fit Club	Herself/Contestant	Contestant: Season 1
2005	Queer Edge with Jack E. Jett & Sandra Bernhard	Herself/Co-Host	Recurring Co-Host
2006	The Tom Joyner Show	Herself	Episode: "Episode #1.14" & "#1.20"
2006	Celebrity Poker Showdown	Herself/Contestant	Episode: "Tournament 8, Game 2"
2006–2007	Comics Unleashed	Herself	Recurring Guest
2007	The View	Herself/Co-Host	Episode: "June 11 & 14, 2007"
2007	In the Loop with iVillage	Herself/Co-Host	Main Co-Host
2009	GSN Live	Herself	Episode: "Kim Coles"
2009	10 Items or Less	Mercedes "Mercy" P. Jones	Recurring Cast: Season 3
2010	RuPaul's Drag Race	Herself/Guest Judge	Episode: "Starrbootylicious"
2011	Life After	Herself	Episode: "Kim Coles: Life After 'Living Single'"
2011	Celebrity Ghost Stories	Herself/Contestant	Episode: "Mickey Rooney/Eric Mabius/Brande Roderick/Kim Coles"
2011	Love That Girl!	Dr. Sarah Van Jones	Episode: "Head Shrunk"
2012	Let's Stay Together	Carol	Episode: "Waiting to XXXhale"
2012	The Soul Man	Wanda	Recurring Cast: Season 1
2013	Big Morning Buzz Live	Herself/Panelist	Episode: "Sylvester Stallone/Jerry Springer/Tim Love"
2013	Wendell and Vinnie	Suzanne	Episode: "Of Mothers & Gardens"
2014	Life with La Toya	Herself	Episode: "What Happens in Vegas..."
2014	Gotham Comedy Live	Herself/Host	Episode: "Anthony Anderson" & "Kim Coles"
2014	Off the Chain	Herself	Episode: "Episode #3.1"
2014	Baby Daddy	Vice Principal Peters	Episode: "Livin' on a Prom"
2014	Quick Draw	Mrs. Tannenbaum	Episode: "The Grasshopper Plague"
2016	Celebrity Food Fight	Herself/Contestant	Episode: "Make Mine a Ruben Studdard"
2016	Mann and Wife	Donna	Episode: "Mann Up"
2019	Sister Circle	Herself/Guest Co-Host	Episode: "August 26, 2019"
2020	25 Words or Less	Herself/Contestant	Recurring Guest
2021	Soul of a Nation	Herself	Episode: "Black Joy"
2021	History of the Sitcom	Herself	Episode: "Just Friends" & "Facing Race"
2022	The Talk	Herself/Guest Co-Host	Episode: "Episode #12.191" & "#12.192"
2022	Dark Side of the 90s	Herself	Episode: "Black Sitcoms' Last Laugh"
2022	The Surreal Life	Herself	Recurring Guest
2022	Finding Happy	Jo Garrett	Main Cast
2022	Home Economics	Tamara	Episode: "Sunday New York Times, $6"
2023	Rewind the '90s	Herself	Episode: "Comedy Rebellion"
2023	See It Loud: The History of Black Television	Herself	Recurring Guest
2023	Dark Side of Comedy	Herself	Episode: "Gilda Radner"
2023	Days of Our Lives	Nurse Whitley King	Regular Cast
2025	Mid-Century Modern	Yvonne	Episode: "Never Have I Ever"
2025–present	Vampirina: Teenage Vampire	Dean Merriweather	Recurring Guest

=== Documentary ===
Year	Title
2020	Fierce Funny & Fly

== Awards and nominations ==
Year	Awards	Category	Recipient	Outcome
1996	NAACP Image Awards	NAACP Image Award for Outstanding Actress in a Comedy Series	"Living Single"	Nominated
1997	NAACP Image Awards	NAACP Image Award for Outstanding Actress in a Comedy Series	"Living Single"	Nominated
1998	NAACP Image Awards	NAACP Image Award for Outstanding Actress in a Comedy Series	"Living Single"	Won
2001	NAACP Image Awards	NAACP Image Award for Outstanding Supporting Actress in a Comedy Series	"Frasier"	Nominated
