= Roe v. Wade (film) =

2020 film by Nick Loeb

- Theatrical release poster
- Directed by: Nick Loeb; Cathy Allyn
- Written by: Nick Loeb; Cathy Allyn
- Story by: Nick Loeb
- Produced by: Nick Loeb; Cathy Allyn
- Starring: Nick Loeb; Stacey Dash; Jamie Kennedy; Joey Lawrence; Greer Grammer; Justine Wachsberger
- Narrated by: Nick Loeb
- Cinematography: Alan McIntyre Smith
- Edited by: Jeffrey Canavan
- Music by: Declan Hartigan
- Production companies: P&J; Producers Capital Fund
- Distributed by: Vendian Entertainment
- Release dates: October 2020 (Vienna); April 2, 2021
- Running time: 112 minutes
- Country: United States
- Language: English
- Budget: $6.5–6.8 million

Roe v. Wade is a 2020 American political legal drama film produced, written and directed by Nick Loeb and Cathy Allyn. It serves as Loeb's dramatization of the 1973 landmark decision of the same name, rendered by the U.S. Supreme Court on the issue of the constitutionality of laws that criminalized or restricted access to abortions.

The film stars a predominantly conservative ensemble cast, including Jon Voight, Stacey Dash and Robert Davi. Loeb also stars as Bernard Nathanson, a gynecologist who co-founded the abortion rights organization NARAL Pro-Choice America and later became an anti-abortion movement advocate. According to Loeb, the film is about "the women's rights movement versus the pro-life movement. It's a social war movie where we take both sides of the argument and hopefully let the audience decide."

The film, which was widely panned by film critics, was first screened at the Vienna Independent Film Festival in October 2020 and was released on April 2, 2021.

== Plot ==
After experiencing a personal tragedy with his girlfriend relating to abortion, Dr. Bernard Nathanson (Nick Loeb) becomes a strong abortion advocate to make sure no woman has to go through what she went through. Together with journalist Larry Lader (Jamie Kennedy), they fight to legalize abortion across the country. Fighting against the anti-abortion lobby headed by Dr. Mildred Jefferson (Stacey Dash), the decision ends up in the U.S. Supreme Court leading to a verdict on abortion.

== Cast ==
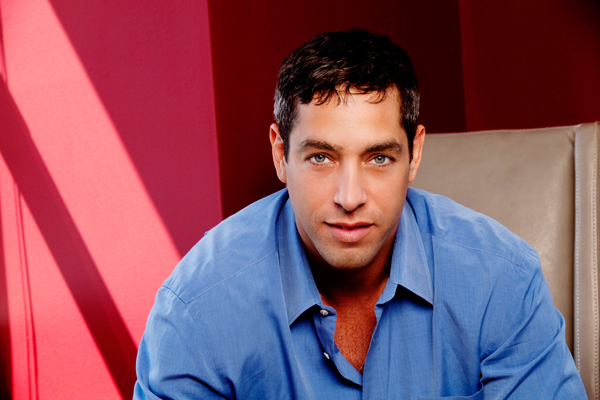
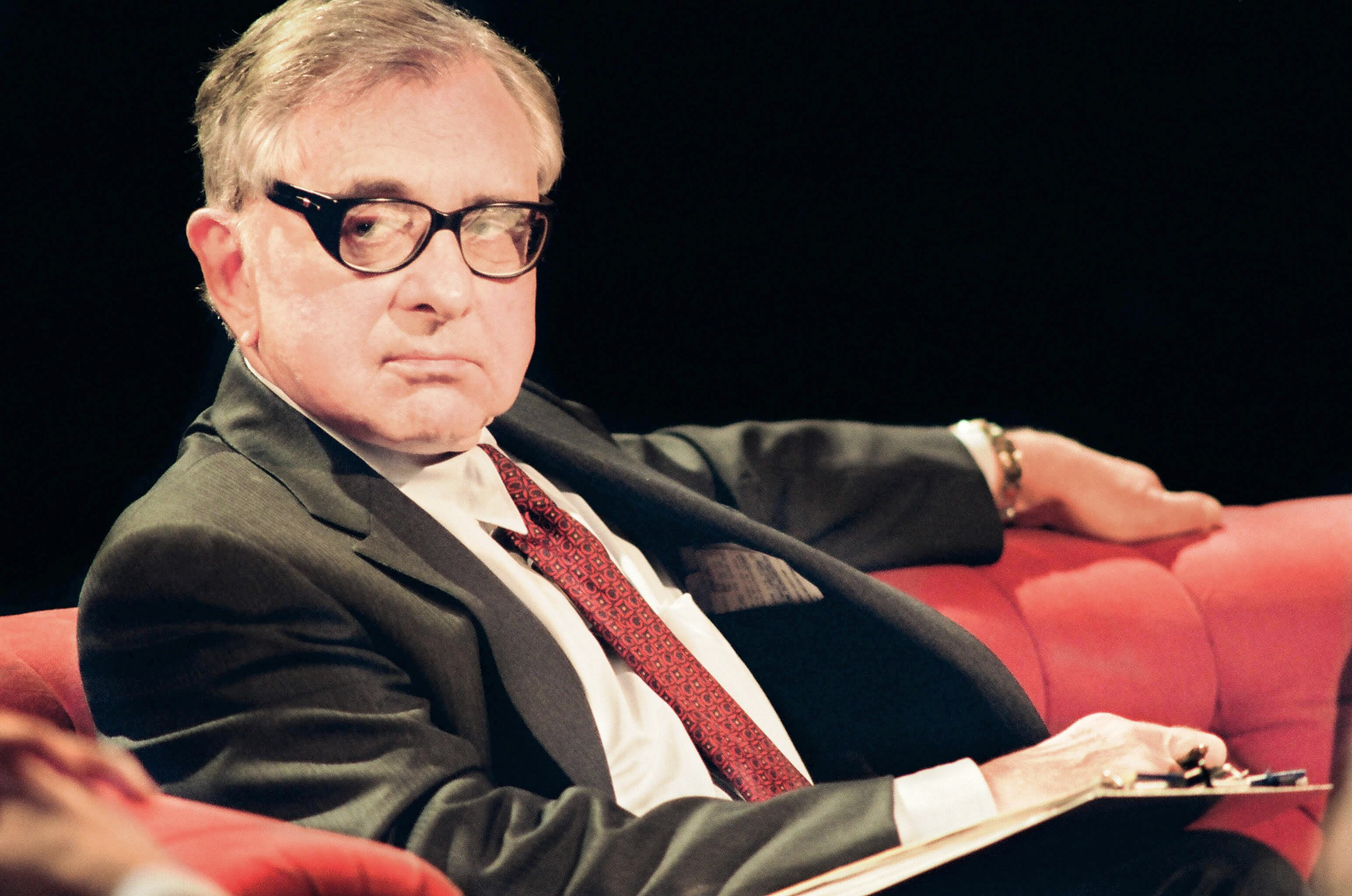
Nick Loeb, co-writer and co-director of Roe v. Wade, also stars in the film as Bernard Nathanson, pictured right.
- Nick Loeb as Bernard Nathanson
- Stacey Dash as Mildred Fay Jefferson
- Jamie Kennedy as Lawrence Lader
- Joey Lawrence as Robert Byrn
- Greer Grammer as Sarah Weddington
- Justine Wachsberger as Linda Coffee
- Octavius Prince as Cyril Means
- Lucy Davenport as Betty Friedan
- Summer Joy Campbell as Norma McCorvey
- Tomi Lahren as Sally Blackmun
- Jon Voight as Warren E. Burger
- Robert Davi as William J. Brennan Jr.
- Corbin Bernsen as Harry Blackmun
- John Schneider as Byron White
- William Forsythe as Potter Stewart
- Wade Williams as William Rehnquist
- Richard Portnow as William O. Douglas
- Jarrett Ellis Beal as Thurgood Marshall
- Steve Guttenberg as Lewis F. Powell Jr.
- Alan Robertson as Henry McKluskey
- Milo Yiannopoulos as David Sopher
- Mike Lindell as News Anchor

== Production ==
Sources reported that Roe v. Wade had been filming since June 15, 2018, under the title 1973. The production was kept hidden from the media until a July 2018 report in The Hollywood Reporter revealed that shooting had taken place in Louisiana. Several cast and crew members (including the original director) left the project within the first few days of filming because of the anti-abortion theme of Loeb and Cathy Allyn's screenplay. Loeb and Allyn stepped in as directors despite their lack of experience. One crew member told The Daily Beast, "They're not keeping people in the loop with the script. When people finally receive the script, they've dropped out really fast." Rather than send scripts out in advance, lines were changed just before shooting. Some locations barred the filmmakers from shooting. Louisiana State University explained filming was not allowed there because of logistical issues and not the film's subject matter.

Executive producer Alveda King, Martin Luther King Jr.'s niece, told Fox News the aim of the film is "to educate the public" with "facts, no fake news". Of the controversy surrounding the film, she acknowledged: "Folks that are inside the set, inside the project, are getting pressure from Hollywood and from outside. They don't want the truth to come out. And so for various reasons, investors, donors, cast [and] crew are getting rattled from all this pressure." The film's unit production manager (UPM), though, disputed King's "no fake news" statement in a Salon report. The UPM told the website that he withdrew from the project the day before filming began because in his opinion the partial script he received contained historical inaccuracies but promoted them as factual. For example, an early draft portrayed Margaret Sanger, founder of Planned Parenthood, as a Ku Klux Klan (KKK) sympathizer who disparaged Black people before 15 robed women during a cross burning, a claim which Sanger biographer Jean H. Baker declared false.

== Reception ==
On the review aggregator Rotten Tomatoes, the film holds an approval rating of 14% based on 6 reviews.

The New York Times cited "hammy acting and poor production values," and called it a "confused, sepia-tinted cross between a mafia thriller, a courtroom drama and a saga of prophetic redemption" that depicted "a mercenary anti-Catholic conspiracy." Variety called it an "atrocious anti-abortion propaganda piece" that disseminates historical falsehoods. Variety said the filmmakers' "revisionist telling amounts to a sometimes sexist smear campaign, executed with roughly the competence of a cheaply assembled infomercial as it exploits religious guilt to disgrace a legal medical procedure."

== Accolades ==
The film premiered as part of the 2020 Vienna Independent Film Festival, at which Voight won the Best Supporting Actor award.

== See also ==
- Abortion in the United States
- Lake of Fire, a 2006 documentary film that tackles the abortion debate in the U.S.
- Unplanned, a 2019 Christian-themed drama film based on the memoir by the anti-abortion activist Abby Johnson
