= Stephen Baldwin =

American actor (born 1966)

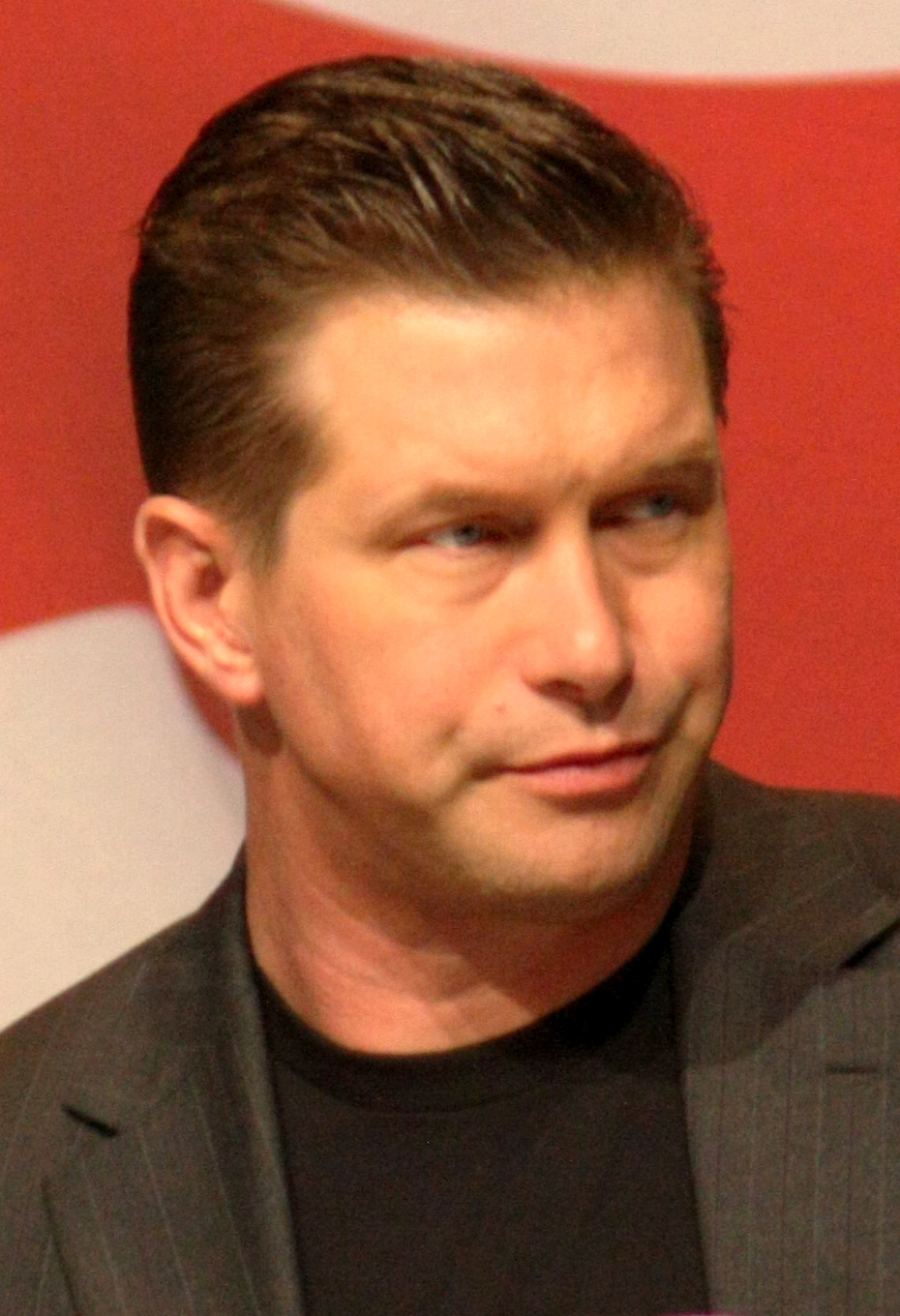
- Baldwin in 2009
- Born: Stephen Andrew Baldwin; May 12, 1966 (age 60); Massapequa, New York, U.S.
- Occupations: Actor; film producer; director
- Years active: 1986–present
- Political party: Republican
- Spouse: Kennya Deodato (m. 1990)
- Children: 2, including Hailey
- Relatives: Justin Bieber (son-in-law); Eumir Deodato (father-in-law); Alec Baldwin (brother); Ireland Baldwin (niece); William Baldwin (brother); Daniel Baldwin (brother)
- Family: Baldwin family
- Website: stephenbaldwin.com

Stephen Andrew Baldwin (born May 12, 1966) is an American actor. He has appeared in the films Born on the Fourth of July (1989), Posse (1993), 8 Seconds, Threesome (both 1994), The Usual Suspects (1995), Bio-Dome (1996), and The Flintstones in Viva Rock Vegas (2000). Baldwin also starred in the television series The Young Riders (1989–1992) and as himself in the reality shows Celebrity Big Brother 7, in which he placed 9th in the United Kingdom, and The Celebrity Apprentice. In 2004, he directed Livin' It, a Christian-themed skateboarding DVD. He is the youngest of the four Baldwin brothers.

== Early life ==
Stephen Andrew Baldwin was born on May 12, 1966, in Massapequa, New York, the youngest son of Carol Newcomb (née Martineau; December 15, 1929 – May 26, 2022), founder of The Baldwin Fund, and Alexander Rae Baldwin Jr. (October 26, 1927 – April 15, 1983), a high school social studies teacher and football coach. Baldwin's elder brothers are actors Alec, Daniel, and William: they are collectively known as the "Baldwin brothers". He was raised in the Catholic faith. In high school, Baldwin participated on the varsity wrestling team, along with William. Baldwin has two elder sisters, Elizabeth (née Baldwin) Keuchler and Jane (née Baldwin) Sasso. Baldwin attended the American Academy of Dramatic Arts.

== Career ==
Baldwin began acting on television and made his film debut in The Beast. He starred in the western television series The Young Riders and in Threesome (1994). Baldwin landed a breakthrough role in The Usual Suspects (1995) and played Barney Rubble in The Flintstones in Viva Rock Vegas (2000). He participated in Celebrity Mole Hawaii, the first celebrity edition of The Mole in 2002. ABC broadcast the program in early 2003. Later that year, he returned for Celebrity Mole Yucatán, which ABC aired in early 2004. In 2006, Baldwin played a villainous thug in the television film Jesse Stone: Night Passage. In August 2007, Baldwin returned to television when CMT cast him in Ty Murray's Celebrity Bull Riding Challenge, one of nine celebrities cast. In the first episode, Baldwin was injured in a bad fall from a wooden pontoon, breaking his shoulder blade and cracking a rib. Under doctor's orders, he left the show in the second episode. From January to March 2008, Baldwin appeared on Donald Trump's Celebrity Apprentice on NBC. He finished fifth out of the 14 celebrity contestants. He and Trace Adkins became friends while competing on the show. In October 2008, Baldwin appeared in Adkins's music video, "Muddy Water". In March 2013, Baldwin returned to compete in All-Star Celebrity Apprentice. He was a contestant on the 2009 NBC reality show I'm a Celebrity…Get Me out of Here!. Baldwin quit the show mid-season. On the second episode, he baptized The Hills actor Spencer Pratt. In 2019, Baldwin starred in a Filipino film, Kaibigan.

== Personal life ==
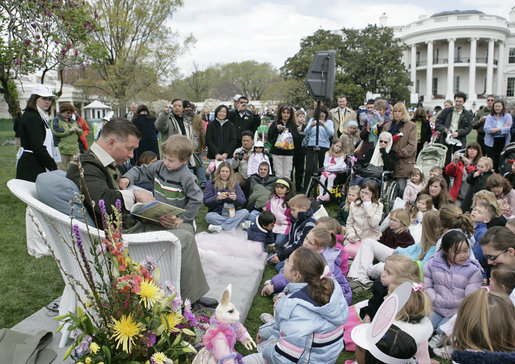
Baldwin reads to children at the 2007 White House Easter Egg Roll.

Baldwin resides in the village of Nyack, New York, with his wife, the Brazilian graphic designer Kennya Baldwin (née Deodato), whom he met in 1987 and married in 1990. They have two daughters, Alaia Baldwin and Hailey Bieber; both are models. His father-in-law is Brazilian composer Eumir Deodato, and Canadian singer Justin Bieber is his son-in-law through marriage to his daughter Hailey. Through his daughters, Baldwin has two grandchildren.

In 2006, Baldwin launched a campaign to prevent an adult bookstore from opening in Nyack. He has a tattoo on his left shoulder of the initials "HM" for Hannah Montana. He got the tattoo after making a pact with Miley Cyrus that he would be allowed to cameo on the show if he had the initials tattooed on him. He revealed the tattoo to Cyrus at a book signing in Nashville on November 10, 2008. He was never given the opportunity to appear on the show and has since said that he regrets getting the tattoo.

In June 2009, Baldwin's foreclosed $515,000, 1.4-acre home in Rockland County, New York was publicly auctioned after he and his wife defaulted on more than $824,000 in mortgage payments. In July, Baldwin filed for Chapter 11 bankruptcy protection claiming more than $2.3 million in debt. Court papers showed he owed $1.2 million on two mortgages on a New York property valued at only $1.1 million, and more than $1 million in taxes and credit card debt.

Baldwin was the first person to enter the Celebrity Big Brother house on January 3, 2010. The theme for this series was "Hell", with a devil head on the front door. He frequently taunted the head by saying "you're a loser". During his stay in the house, he frequently read passages from the Bible to his fellow housemates. He failed to win many fans and was evicted on January 22, 2010, becoming the fourth housemate to be evicted. In a three-way vote—against Ivana Trump and Sisqó—he received 50% of the public vote. After his eviction, the website restorestephenbaldwin.org, unsolicited by him, began soliciting cash donations to improve Baldwin's career.

In December 2010, Baldwin filed a $3.8 million lawsuit against Kevin Costner over oil-separating technology that was used to help solve the BP oil spill in the Gulf of Mexico. In June 2012, a jury sided with Costner and awarded Baldwin no damages. In March 2013, Baldwin pleaded guilty to failing to file income taxes for the years 2008, 2009, and 2010. He stated that he never intended to avoid paying taxes and that he had received bad advice from lawyers and accountants. Baldwin agreed to pay $300,000 within a year, or he would be sentenced to five years' probation and have five years to pay the money.

== Views ==
=== Religion ===
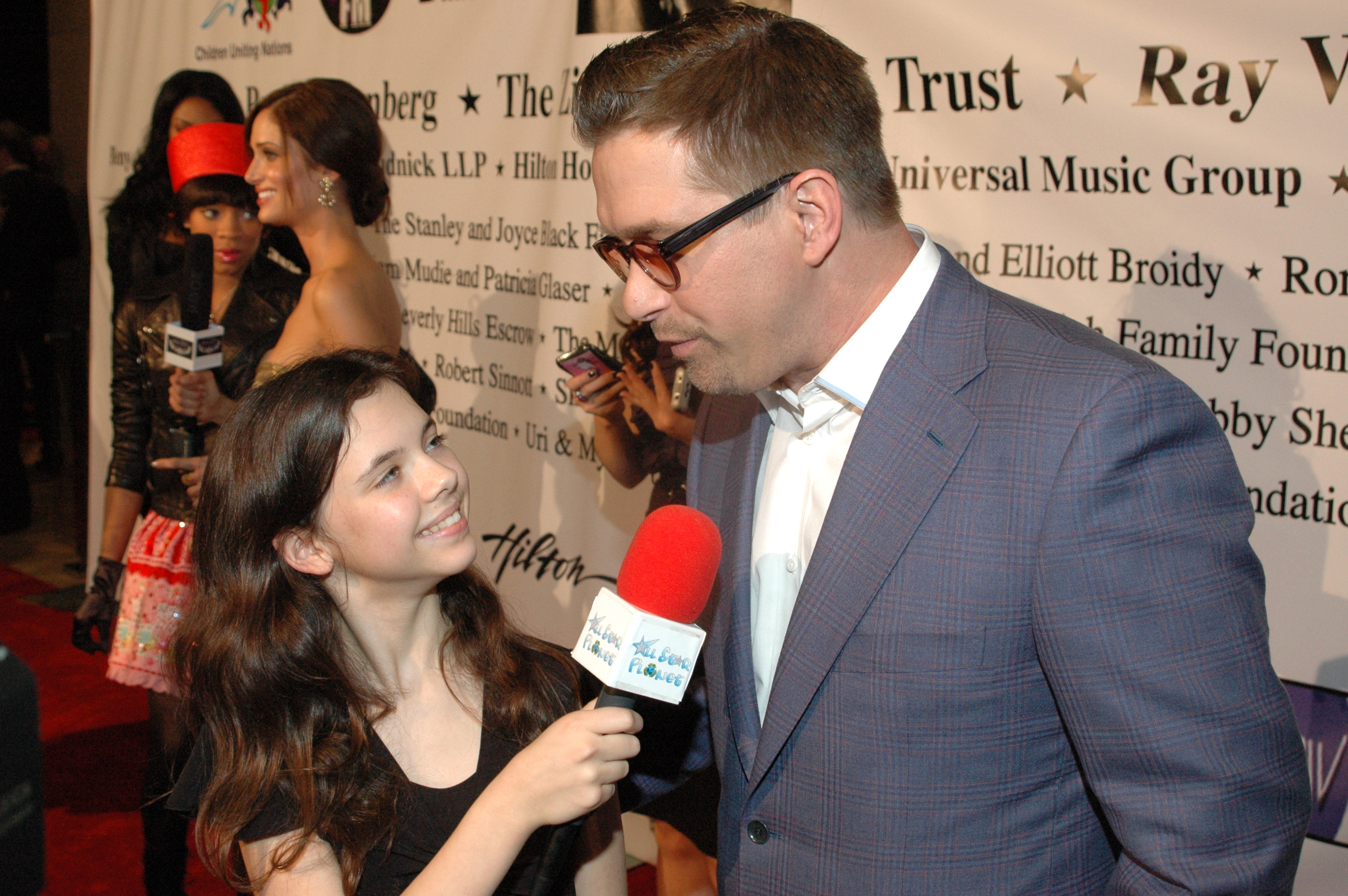
Baldwin talks on the red carpet of a Children Uniting Nations party, 2009.

In September 2006, Baldwin released his book titled The Unusual Suspect, which details highlights from his personal life, career, days of drug abuse, and his turn to becoming a born-again Evangelical after the September 11 attacks in 2001. In the same year, Baldwin, Mario D'Ortenzio, and Bobby Brewer founded Breakthrough Ministry, which was designed to use extreme sports as a ministry via arena tours, called AsSalt Tours. The tours featured extreme sports celebrities, including Christian Hosoi.

In late 2008, Baldwin formed a for-profit organization called Antioch Ministry, which exists "to facilitate the gifts and calling of Stephen Baldwin." In 2009, Baldwin launched a third ministry called Now More Than Ever, designed to reach enlisted men and women in the U.S. armed services around the world. In 2008, Baldwin teamed up with conservative talk-radio host Kevin McCullough to put together a Saturday radio show called Baldwin/McCullough Radio. As of April 18, 2009, the show aired on 213 stations and in more than 400 cities across the US and worldwide on Sirius 161 and XM 227. Baldwin appears weekly on the show from the broadcast studios in New York City and from various locations around the country when he is traveling for other business purposes.

=== Politics ===
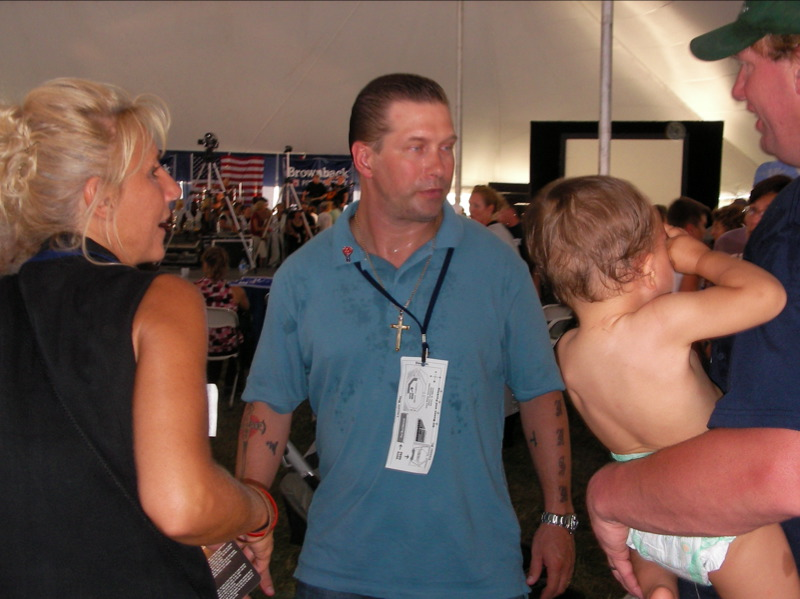
Baldwin at the Iowa Straw Poll in support of Brownback, 2007

In 2007, Baldwin endorsed Sam Brownback for U.S. president. After Brownback ended his campaign, Baldwin switched his support to Mike Huckabee. Baldwin was an outspoken advocate of the John McCain–Sarah Palin presidential ticket after Huckabee dropped out of the 2008 presidential election.

In 2011, Baldwin mentioned the possibility of entering New York City's 2013 mayoral election as an opponent of his brother Alec, who had suggested that he might run himself.

Baldwin was among the first Hollywood celebrities to endorse Donald Trump in the 2016 presidential election. He would later endorse Trump in 2020 and 2024.

== Filmography ==
=== Film ===
Year	Title	Role	Notes
1988	Homeboy	Luna Park Drunk	
1988	The Beast	Anthony Golikov	
1989	Last Exit to Brooklyn	Sal	
1989	Casualties of War	Soldier	
1989	Born on the Fourth of July	Billy Vorsovich	
1990	Jury Duty: The Comedy	Carlucci	TV movie
1992	Crossing the Bridge	Danny Morgan	
1993	Posse	Jimmy J. "Little J" Teeters	
1993	Bitter Harvest	Travis	
1994	Threesome	Stuart	
1994	8 Seconds	Tuff Hedeman	
1994	Mrs. Parker and the Vicious Circle	Roger Spalding	
1994	A Simple Twist of Fate	Danny Newland	
1994	New Eden	Adams	TV movie
1995	The Usual Suspects	Michael McManus	
1995	Fall Time	Leon	
1995	Under the Hula Moon	Buzzard "Buzz" Wall	
1995	Dead Weekend	Agent Weed	TV movie
1996	Bio-Dome	Doyle Johnson	
1996	Fled	Luke Dodge	
1996	Crimetime	Bobby Mahon	
1997	Sub Down	Rick Postley	TV movie
1998	Half Baked	MacGyver Smoker	
1998	Scar City	John Trace	
1998	One Tough Cop	Bo Dietl	
1999	Friends & Lovers	Jon	
1999	The Sex Monster	Murphy	
1999	Absence of the Good	Caleb Barnes	TV movie
2000	Mercy	The Mechanic	
2000	The Flintstones in Viva Rock Vegas	Barney Rubble	
2000	Table One	Jimmy	
2000	Cutaway	Vic Cooper	TV movie
2001	XChange	Clone #1 / Toffler 3	
2001	Zebra Lounge	Jack Bauer	TV movie
2001	Protection	Sal	
2001	Dead Awake	Desmond Caine	
2002	Slap Shot 2: Breaking the Ice	Sean Linden	Video
2002	Greenmail	Scott Anderson	Video
2002	Spider's Web	Clay Harding	
2003	Silent Warnings	Joe "Cousin Joe" Vossimer	TV movie
2003	Firefight	Wolf	
2003	Lost Treasure	Bryan McBride	
2003	Shelter Island	Lenny	
2004	Target	Charlie Snow	
2004	Fallacy	Realtor	
2004	Six: The Mark Unleashed	Luke	
2005	Liminality	Caramelli	Short
2005	Betrayed	Max Garrett	Video
2005	The Snake King	Matt Ford	TV movie
2005	Midnight Clear	Lefty	Short
2006	Jesse Stone: Night Passage	Joe Genest	TV movie
2006	Dark Storm	Daniel Grey	TV movie
2006	Earthstorm	John Redding	TV movie
2006	The Genius Club	Rory Johnson	
2006	Midnight Clear	Lefty	
2007	Harpies	Jason	TV movie
2007	Fred Claus	Himself	
2008	The Flyboys	Silvio Esposito	
2008	Shark in Venice	David Franks	
2009	Shoot the Duke	Max Rockinsky	
2010	Let the Game Begin	David Carroll	
2010	Loving the Bad Man	McQuade	
2010	The Perfect Hurl	El Toro	Short
2012	Dino Time	Surly (voice)	
2013	I'm in Love with a Church Girl	Jason McDaniels	
2014	Death Squad	Ryan Willburn	
2014	Let the Lion Roar	Jerome	
2014	The Costume Shop	Older Kyle	
2015	Balance	Titus	Short
2015	Hoovey	Pastor	
2015	Touched	Detective Nick	
2015	The Networker	Pierre	
2015	Faith of Our Fathers	Mansfield	
2015	God's Club	Michael Evans	
2016	No Panic, With a Hint of Hysteria	Chester	
2016	Magi	Burga Adler	
2016	The Apostle Peter: Redemption	Nero	
2016	Scarlett	Chase's Father	
2017	Run	Jeff Conners	
2017	The UnMiracle	David Stevenson	
2017	Heaven, How I Got Here: The Story of the Thief on the Cross	The thief	A soliloquy originally performed in 2015 and made into a film in 2017.
2019	Tapestry	Ryan	
2019	The Least of These: The Graham Staines Story	Graham Staines	
2019	A Walk with Grace	Jay Thorson	
2019	Kaibigan	John Anderson	
2021	Church People	Chad Chase	
2021	Missiya: Prorok	-	
2021	Blood Pageant	Priest	
2024	A Carpenter’s Prayer	Ken Strickler	

=== Television ===
Year	Title	Role	Notes
1986	Kate & Allie	Student	Episode: "The Trouble with Jason"
1987	American Playhouse	Gutter Pup	Episode: "The Prodigious Hickey"
1988	Family Ties	Bobby	Episode: "Beyond Therapy"
1989	China Beach	Chuck Berry	Episode: "All About E.E.V."
1989–1992	The Young Riders	William F. Cody	Main Cast
1994	Saturday Night Live	Himself	Episode: "Alec Baldwin & Kim Basinger/UB40"
1995	In a New Light: Sex Unplugged	Himself/Host	Main Host
1995	Legend	Jimmy Siringo	Episode: "Mr. Pratt Goes to Sheridan"
1996	Moviewatch	Himself	Episode: "Episode #5.4"
1998	Mr. Murder	Marty Stillwater/Alfie	Episode: "Part 1 & 2"
1998–1999	Hollywood Squares	Himself/Panelist	Recurring Panelist
2000	The Other Side	Himself	Episode: "King of New York"
2000	Batman Beyond	Charlie Bigelow (voice)	Episode: "Big Time"
2001	Wild On!	Himself	Episode: "Wild on Spring Break 2001"
2001	Night Visions	Barry	Episode: "The Doghouse"
2002	Fear Factor	Himself	Episode: "Celebrity Fear Factor 2"
2003	Bikini Destinations	Himself	Episode: "France"
2003–2004	The Mole	Himself/Contestant	Contestant: Season 3-4
2004	Celebrity Blackjack	Himself	Episode: "Tournament 8, Game 8"
2004	My Coolest Years	Himself	Episode: "My First Time, Summer Vacation"
2004	Scare Tactics	Himself/Host	Main Host: Season 2
2004	Livin' It	Himself/Host	Main Host
2005	CSI: Crime Scene Investigation	Jesse Acheson	Episode: "Compulsion"
2007	UCB Comedy Originals	Himself	Episode: "Ask Stevie B."
2007	Eyes	Detective Vincent Novella	Episode: "Burglary"
2009	The Celebrity Apprentice	Himself/Contestant	Contestant: Season 7
2009	I'm a Celebrity...Get Me Out of Here!	Himself/Contestant	Contestant: Season 2
2010	Countdown	Himself/Contestant	Episode: "Celebrity Big Brother Special"
2010	8 Out of 10 Cats	Himself	Episode: "Episode #9.4"
2010	Celebrity Big Brother	Himself/Contestant	Contestant: Season 7
2013	All-Star Celebrity Apprentice	Himself/Contestant	Contestant: Season 13
2017–2018	The Great American Pilgrimage	Himself/Host	Main Host
2021	Nova Vita	Agent Smith	Main Cast
2025	Special Forces: World's Toughest Test	Himself/Contestant	Contestant: Season 3 (2 episodes)

=== Director ===
Year	Title	Notes
2004	Livin' It	Documentary short
2012	The Will to Drill	Documentary

== Awards ==
Year	Association	Category	Work	Result
1995	National Board of Review	Best Acting by an Ensemble	The Usual Suspects	Won
2001	Golden Raspberry Awards	Worst Supporting Actor	The Flintstones in Viva Rock Vegas	Nominated
