= Lucy Davenport =

British actress

- Education: Royal Academy of Dramatic Art
- Occupation: Actress
- Years active: 2000–present
- Height: 5 ft 4 in (1.63 m)

Lucy Davenport is a British actress who graduated at the Royal Academy of Dramatic Art in 1999.

== Filmography ==
=== Film ===
Year	Title	Role	Notes
2000	Soho Square	Julia	
2002	Gangs of New York	Miss Schermerhorn	
2003	Sylvia	Doreen	
2004	If Only	Lottie	
2007	Ditto	Cathy	Short film
2010	Alice in Wonderland	Woman with Big Ears	
2010	Dinner for Schmucks	Birgit Mueller	
2011	A Cinderella Story: Once Upon a Song	Ms. Plumberg	Direct to video
2013	Gangster Squad	Slapsy Maxie's singer	
2013	Breathe In	Sophie's aunt	
2013	Escape from Planet Earth	BASA Escape Pod Voice	Voice (uncredited)
2020	Roe v. Wade	Betty Friedan	

=== Television ===
Year	Title	Role	Notes
2002	Dickens	Mary Hogarth	1 episode
2003	Frankenstein: Birth of a Monster	Mary Shelley	Television film
2004	Doctors	Polly	1 episode
2007	Doctor Who	Pale Woman	Gridlock
2013	Seek	Maria	NCIS (TV series) (Season 10, Episode 18)
2013	Deadtime Stories	Mrs. Leeds	1 episode
