= Bobby Brewer =

American pastor, author and talk radio personality

Robert Brewer (1963 – June 11, 2024) was an American pastor, author, and talk radio personality based in Phoenix, Arizona. In addition to being the co-host of a Christian radio show and pastor, he was known for being an Evangelical Christian who witnessed the 1997 Phoenix Lights. In 2002, he wrote an article for the Christian Research Journal. In 2022, he wrote a book, UFOs: 12 Things You Should Know (A Christian Perspective) (ISBN 9781640795617), in which he gave his assessment of the phenomenon.

== Early life ==
Brewer was born in Japan at a United States Navy base, his father was an enlisted sailor for the United States Navy. Brewer grew up in San Diego, California; Virginia Beach, Virginia; and Roanoke, Virginia prior to moving to Phoenix, Arizona.

== Education ==
Brewer obtained a Masters in Divinity (M. Div.) at Liberty Baptist Theological Seminary, a graduate school for aspiring pastors founded by Rev. Jerry Falwell in Lynchburg, Virginia, and a Doctorate of Ministry (D.Min.) from Phoenix Seminary in Phoenix, Arizona.

== Career ==
While at Liberty Baptist Theological Seminary, Brewer studied church growth under Dr. Elmer Towns, who has authored numerous books on the subject of church growth. Towns wrote the foreword to Brewer's book Postmodernism: What You Should Know & Do About It. Upon completion of his doctorate, Brewer regularly spoke at Christian conferences regarding the implications of Postmodernism upon the North American church and how outreach and evangelistic methodologies could and should adjust for the transition of eras (i.e., Modern to Postmodern). Prior to becoming a "Cowboy Church" pastor for Reigning Grace Ranch, Rio Verde, Arizona, he served on the pastoral staff of two megachurches in Scottsdale, Arizona; Scottsdale Bible Church, and served as the Lead Pastor for North Chapel Bible Church in Fountain Hills, Arizona which became a campus of Scottsdale Bible Church in 2021. Brewer was a founding team member for an extreme sports ministry founded by actor Stephen Baldwin and D'Ortenzio but restructured as "Death to Life Revolution" ministry. On January 10, 2021 it was announced by Scottsdale Bible Church that North Chapel Bible Church would become their Fountain Hills campus with a new location and with Brewer as the campus pastor. Following this merger and relocation, Brewer then became the Pastor of Reigning Grace Ranch in Rio Verde, Arizona on June 1, 2022.

== Radio ==
From 2004-2008 Brewer was the co-host of Faith in the Real World, a local call-in radio show in Phoenix, Arizona on AM 1360 KPXQ of Salem Broadcasting. After partnering with Stephen Baldwin in 2006, the show's name and the format were changed to Breakthrough Radio. In 2011, Brewer began co-hosting Freakshow with D'Ortenzio.

== Bibliography ==
- Postmodernism: What You Should Know and Do About It (ISBN 9780595253722).
- UFOs: 12 Things Everyone Should Know (ISBN 9781640795617).
- Help! I'm Really Single (ISBN 978-1490870465).
- Brewer has co-authored several books with Dr. Darryl DelHousaye, president of Phoenix Seminary, e.g., The Personal Journal of Solomon: A Commentary of Ecclesiastes for the Common Reader (ISBN 9781606471142).
