= If Only (2004 film) =

2004 romantic fantasy drama film by Gil Junger

- Theatrical release poster
- Directed by: Gil Junger
- Written by: Christina Welsh
- Produced by: Jill Gilbert; Jeffrey Graup; Jennifer Love Hewitt
- Starring: Jennifer Love Hewitt; Paul Nicholls; Tom Wilkinson; Lucy Davenport
- Cinematography: Giles Nuttgens
- Edited by: William M. Anderson; Padraic McKinley
- Music by: Adrian Johnston
- Distributed by: Sony Pictures Home Entertainment
- Release dates: 23 January 2004 (Sarasota Film Festival); 23 September 2005 (Spain); 15 January 2006 (US; ABC Family)
- Running time: 92 minutes
- Countries: United States; United Kingdom
- Language: English
- Budget: $3 million
- Box office: $532,673

If Only is a 2004 romantic fantasy drama film directed by Gil Junger and starring Jennifer Love Hewitt and Paul Nicholls.

== Plot ==
Ian Wyndham (Nicholls) is a British businessman who lives with his American musician girlfriend, Samantha Andrews (Hewitt), in London. Taking us through a day in Ian and Samantha's life, the film opens by showing different events such as Samantha getting burnt on a kettle, Ian's watch breaking, Samantha getting Coca-Cola splashed on her clothing, and Ian being interrupted by Samantha during an important meeting at work.

Samantha gets angry at Ian as he always treats her as his second priority and tells him that she just wants him to love her. Ian makes one last attempt to reconcile with Samantha. An angry Samantha gets into a taxi and asks Ian whether he is coming or not - he remains on the sidewalk. The taxi is T-boned, and Samantha dies. From the hospital, a heartbroken Ian returns to their apartment, finds Samantha's notebook and opens it, finding a song she was working on. He falls asleep clutching the notebook.

When he awakes in the morning, he is shocked to hear Samantha talking, and wakes to find her in the bed beside him. He is scared at first but after the initial confusion, concludes that the previous day must have been a dream. Ian feels happy to have Samantha by his side.

The events of the day are similar to those he already experienced in the "dream", although occurring at different times and in different ways. Ian is sure that he had a premonition and that at day's end, Samantha will die. Samantha does burn her hand; she gets soda on her blouse, but in different ways from the previous occasion. Other differences from the previous day include: Ian's watch remains in working order this time, and his meeting seeking financial backing for his company's next project is successful. One thing that remains the same is Ian's after work cab ride. Ian finds that the driver today is the same one from the previous evening - a man who tells Ian that the most important thing in Ian's life is to love Samantha.

Ian chases around London until he locates Samantha, and convinces her to temporarily leave the city. At her choice, they take the train to Ian's home town, and climb his favorite hill. A sudden shower sends them into an isolated hut. There, he asks her how she would spend her last day if she only had one left. She replies that she would spend it with him. He declares his devotion to her, and they make love in front the fire.

Returning to the village, the couple have drinks at his late father's favorite hangout. Ian describes his father, whom Ian idolized before the hometown's primary employer closed its factory, putting Ian's father, and the rest of the town, out of work. Ian's father never found another job, and subsequently, became an alcoholic.

The two return to London and Ian takes Samantha on the London Eye as another surprise. Back in their apartment, Ian surreptitiously removes a folded-up song from Samantha's notebook, and takes it to a printing shop while Samantha goes to her graduation concert with her violin. Before the show begins Ian gives the photocopied pages to an organizer. After the performance in which Samantha is a violinist, the organiser announces Samantha's name as the next performer. A nervous Samantha proceeds onto the stage as the orchestra begins to play the song printed on Ian's photocopied sheets. She sings the song she wrote for Ian in her notebook and the crowd burst into applause at her performance.

Instead of going to Tantra, the restaurant at which Ian previously made reservations, they eat at a more intimate restaurant of Samantha's choice. Ian gives her a charm bracelet with meaningful charms. After dinner, Ian tells Samantha why he loves her. As a taxi pulls over and Samantha gets in, she asks him again whether he is getting in or not. This time Ian gets in and sees that the cab driver is the same as before. As the clock strikes 11, the taxi (again) meets with a sideways collision.

The hospital scene is repeated, where Samantha's friend runs to console the survivor of the crash. This time, however, Samantha was hurt but survived, while Ian is the victim.

The film ends six months later, with Samantha packing up the apartment she shared with Ian while looking at his watch, and then performing onstage while wearing the bracelet that Ian gave her, with tears in her eyes but smiling, intercut with a scene of her finally getting to the top of the mountain that she tried to climb with Ian on that last day together.

== Cast ==
- Jennifer Love Hewitt as Samantha Andrews
- Paul Nicholls as Ian Wyndham
- Tom Wilkinson as Taxi driver
- Lucy Davenport as Lottie

== Production ==
Filming locations in London include (in chronological order): Kensington Park Road where their apartment is located; CityPoint where Ian works; Piccadilly where Ian is seen running towards the Méridien hotel; Westminster tube station exit; and the London Eye. Filming was done between November 2002 and January 2003.

== Soundtrack ==
Hewitt performed two songs from the soundtrack, "Love Will Show You Everything" and "Take My Heart Back". She wrote the lyrics of "Take My Heart Back" to music of Chris Canute. Hewitt and Gil Junger co-wrote "Love Will Show You Everything", with music by Paul Englishby.

== Release ==
The movie made its world premiere at the Sarasota Film Festival in January 2004. However it was not picked up for US distribution. It went on to play around the world throughout late 2004 and 2005. American audiences were given a chance to see this film when it premiered on the American ABC Family television network on 15 January 2006. The film premiered on UK television on the Hallmark channel, on 28 July 2009.
