= A Walk with Grace =

- Film poster
- Directed by: Nick Kellis
- Written by: Nick Kellis
- Produced by: Nick Kellis, April Kennedy, Lance Paul
- Starring: Ashley Bratcher; David Lee Smith; Jason London; Stephen Baldwin
- Release date: October 30, 2019
- Country: United States
- Language: English

A Walk with Grace is a 2019 American "faith-based" drama film, starring David Lee Smith, Stephen Baldwin, Jason London, and Ashley Bratcher, and written and directed by Nick Kellis.

Principal photography started in Lima, Ohio in June 2017. The film premiered in Wapakoneta, Ohio on October 30, 2019.

== Cast ==
- Ashley Bratcher as Grace
- David Lee Smith as Nate Lassiter
- Jason London as Pastor Tom Grey
- Stephen Baldwin as Jay Thorson
- Cindy Pickett as Grandma Carol
- Joe Estevez as Dale
- Austin St. John as Duane Shaffer
- Jenni-Kate DeShon as Sabrina
- Yorke Fryer as Shawn Croft
- Nicole Dambro as Graciela
- Lance Paul as Joel
- Mishka Calderon as Chloe Lassiter
- Ian Grey as Luke Grey
