= Princess Cut (film) =

- Directed by: Paul Munger
- Written by: Paul Munger
- Produced by: Paul Munger
- Starring: Ashley Bratcher; Joseph Gray; Cory Assink
- Cinematography: Spencer Weaver
- Edited by: Paul Munger
- Music by: Rick Holets
- Distributed by: Tugg
- Release date: August 4, 2015
- Running time: 100 minutes
- Country: United States
- Language: English

Princess Cut is a 2015 American Christian romance film, directed and written by Paul Munger.

== Plot ==
A woman tries to find love but hasn't had much success in truly finding it. After a number of tries, she decides to do things differently, by how God would need them to.

== Cast ==
- Ashley Bratcher as Grace Anderson
- Joseph Gray as Clint Masters
- Rusty Martin Sr. as Jim Anderson
- Mimi Sagadin as Katherine Anderson
- Rusty Martin as Robert Anderson
- Evan Brinkman as Drew Anderson

== Accolades ==
| Year | Award | Category | Recipient | Result | Ref. |
|---|---|---|---|---|---|
| 2016 | International Christian Film Festival | Best Actress | Ashley Bratcher | Nominated | |
| 2016 | Pan Pacific Film Festival | Best Actress | Ashley Bratcher | Nominated | |
