= Livin' It =

- Directed by: Stephen Baldwin
- Produced by: Kevin Palau with contributions from Kirk Purdy.
- Starring: Stephen Baldwin; Jud Heald; Tim Byrne; Luke Braddock; Anthony Carney; Jared Lee; Phil Trotter; Sierra Fellers
- Release date: 2004
- Running time: 45 minutes
- Country: United States
- Language: English

Livin' It is a skateboarding film directed by Stephen Baldwin and executive produced by Kevin Palau, son of evangelist Luis Palau. The film is aimed at a Christian audience, featuring footage of various skateboarders interspersed with interviews where they discuss their relationship with God. The film is a product of Palau and Baldwin's Livin’ It Ministry, and would later be followed by a Livin’ It tour as well as related books and comics.

The film was shot in Portland, Oregon with a particular focus on Skatechurch, an evangelical skatepark founded by pastor Paul Andersen. Featured skateboarders and BMX riders include Jud Heald, Tim Byrne, Luke Braddock, Anthony Carney, Jared Lee, Phil Trotter, and Sierra Fellers. Kevin Palau and Stephen Baldwin make brief cameos throughout.

The ministry claims that more than 150,000 copies of Livin' It have been distributed. It combines skateboarding footage with what Baldwin calls a real message about life. In his interview with PBS, Baldwin said of the DVD: "That was the goal, to create something very cool that the kids could watch and then explore the DVD, go to those bonus features, hear the testimonies, hear about what's going on in the lives of these guys they admire and look up to, and then hopefully be touched by it."

== Soundtrack ==
The soundtrack for the movie featured a number of tracks from Christian punk and hip hop artists.

“Livin’ It Anthem” by The Cross Movement

“Fury” by Juggernautz

“Sheep of the U.S.” by Calibretto 13 (Luke Braddock)

“Hollywood (Is Burning Down)” by Calibretto 13

“Tip of My Tongue” by Stereo Motion (Jared Lee)

“Break Loose” by Vla Hemia

“Beside Me” by Shade (John Greer)

“Wasted (With You)” by Squad 5-0 (Anthony Carney)

“Today Tomorrow” by Vla Hemia

“Mosa Dixie” by Soul-Junk

“Charlie Brown” by LA Symphony (Phil Trotter)

“Gotham” by Soul-Junk (Bruce Crimson)

“Believe” by Shade

“Waiting” by Adam Skills (Sierra Fellers)

“Lady Luck” by LA Symphony (Tim Bryne)

“Your Love, Oh Lord” by Third Day

“Monday in Vegas” by Lucerin Blue (Vic Murphy)

“Phaze One” by Daniel Lazinski

== See also ==
- Skateboarding in Portland, Oregon
