= Soho Square (film) =

- DVD cover
- Directed by: Jamie Rafn
- Written by: Jamie Rafn
- Produced by: Imogen Cooper; Jamie Rafn
- Starring: Anthony Biggs; Lucy Davenport
- Cinematography: Brendan McGinty
- Edited by: Sam Eastall; Jamie Rafn
- Music by: Chris Read
- Production company: Raven Films
- Distributed by: Raven Films; Showtime Networks
- Release date: 2000
- Running time: 90 minutes
- Country: United Kingdom
- Language: English

Soho Square is a 2000 British thriller film written and directed by Jamie Rafn, starring Anthony Biggs and Lucy Davenport.

== Cast ==
- Anthony Biggs as J.
- Lucy Davenport as Julia
- Livy Armstrong as Trump
- Helen Day as Aunty Bel
- Olegar Fedoro as S.M.
- Tim FitzHigham
- Amanda Haberland as Barmaid
- Andrew Heath as Shopkeeper
- Pamela Mandell as Mum
- Emma Poole as Claire
- William Wilde as Callaway

== Reception ==
Gil Jawetz of DVD Talk rated the film 4 stars out of 5 and wrote: "A tough film about a character's very internal unraveling, Soho Square uses the basic tools of filmmaking (editing, images, sound) in ways that bypass the need for a big budget." He praised Rafn's direction, stating that while Rafn "may be working with a tired genre", his "approach is fresh and unpretentious." Anne Sherber of Video Store Magazine praised the "strong" performances and opined that Rafn's "displays a distinctive style in which time passing is articulated by the changing London cityscape in hyperspeed." Ed Hulse of Video Business wrote that while the film "starts off well, promising a stylishly gritty thriller with a flawed but interesting protagonist", eventually the "technique becomes obtrusive and actually begins impeding the plot's development."
