= Unplanned =

2019 anti-abortion film directed by Chuck Konzelman and Cary Solomon

- Theatrical release poster
- Directed by: Cary Solomon; Chuck Konzelman
- Screenplay by: Cary Solomon; Chuck Konzelman
- Produced by: Chris Jones; Joe Knopp; Daryl Lefever; Cary Solomon; Chuck Konzelman
- Starring: Ashley Bratcher; Brooks Ryan; Robia Scott
- Cinematography: Drew Maw
- Edited by: Parker Adams; Dana Wilson
- Music by: Stephen Blake Kanicka
- Production company: Soli Deo Gloria
- Distributed by: Pure Flix Entertainment
- Release date: March 29, 2019 (United States)
- Running time: 106 minutes
- Country: United States
- Language: English
- Budget: $6 million
- Box office: $21.3 million

Unplanned is a 2019 American drama film written and directed by Cary Solomon and Chuck Konzelman. It is based on the disputed 2011 memoir Unplanned by anti-abortion activist Abby Johnson. The film stars Ashley Bratcher as Johnson, following her life as a clinic director for Planned Parenthood and her subsequent transition to anti-abortion activism.

The film was released to US theaters by evangelical Christian studio Pure Flix on March 29, 2019. The working title was Redeemed, and details of its subject were kept from the public in order to minimize protests by abortion rights advocates. My Pillow CEO Mike Lindell served as an executive producer and appears in the film in a cameo role. Some TV channels refused to air ads for the film due to its subject matter.

The film grossed $21 million worldwide on a $6 million budget. The accuracy of the film's portrayal of abortion and of Planned Parenthood have been severely criticized by doctors and advocates for Planned Parenthood, with several commentators describing it as political propaganda.

== Plot ==
The plot closely follows the account found in Abby Johnson's memoir, Unplanned. The film opens with a depiction of Johnson's home life with her husband, Doug, and daughter, Grace. In voice-over, Abby Johnson says she was tricked into participating with Planned Parenthood and the scene shifts to a time in 2009 when she claims she was asked to assist in an ultrasound-guided suction aspiration abortion at thirteen weeks gestation. During the procedure, Abby seems to witness the fetus showing distress as it is aborted. The scene ends with Abby leaving in tears. Johnson then describes, in voice over, that her story started her junior year at Texas A&M. The scene is depicted in flashback of a Planned Parenthood booth at a career fair. Johnson agrees to volunteer after the representative in the booth says to her that the ultimate goal was to reduce the number of abortions. As a clinic escort, she meets director Cheryl and witnesses anti-abortion protesters being verbally confrontational towards the women going in. One protester, Marilisa, is depicted as being kinder to women than the other protestors and says that those from her organization, "Coalition for Life", are "not here to hurt them or condemn them".

A flashback within a flashback then happens to when Abby had her two abortions, the first as a college student and the second after she marries then divorces. During the second abortion, for $400, she is given mifepristone at the clinic and is told there will be "a little bleeding", but the experience is depicted as being excruciatingly painful, over twelve hours and then followed up with "eight weeks of blood clots and excruciating cramps" causing her to fear for her life.

The film then cuts back to Abby's continuing work at the clinic, and she recounts in voice-over that it became "my career, despite the disapproval of virtually everyone in my life". The film flashes forward to her second marriage to Doug, a man who proclaims love while, like her parents, disapproving of her career on religious and moral grounds. Abby describes starting her life with Doug and attending a church with him that is decidedly opposed to abortion even while she continues to work at Planned Parenthood.

Abby becomes pregnant by Doug and, feeling secure in her life and marriage, chooses to carry the pregnancy. A scene is depicted of a botched abortion taking place at the clinic where Abby is told not to call an ambulance because of the way it would "look". Afterward, the staff throws Abby a baby shower. Abby gives birth to Grace and is promoted to director when Cheryl is transferred to Houston. Before Hurricane Ike strikes, Abby coordinates all of the abortions to happen beforehand, anticipating that it will not be possible to perform the procedures for a while after the hurricane.

At a company meeting led by Cheryl and attended by clinic directors, Abby wins Employee of the Year. Cheryl then instructs the directors to double their abortion numbers. Abby is scolded for objecting to this by Cheryl, who explains that Planned Parenthood makes its money off of abortions the same way that fast food restaurants make money off of fries and soda, and says that "non-profit is a tax status, not a business model". Abby vents her frustrations to Doug, who later takes her out to dinner to help her relax. They leave the restaurant when they learn that abortion doctor George Tiller has been murdered, and they decide to spend the night with Grace at Abby's parents' house for their safety.

Abby is eventually formally reprimanded for insubordination after which the first few moments of the film are repeated just prior to Abby's participation in the procedure. Abby is then depicted going to the office of 40 Days for Life, run by Marilisa and her husband, Shawn, and tearfully telling them that she cannot stay at her job after what she has seen. They offer to help her find employment. Abby formally resigns from Planned Parenthood and begins to help with the 40 Days for Life campaign, to the point of being on the other side of the clinic fence encouraging women not to go through with their abortions. Planned Parenthood sues Abby for leaking confidential information about its operations, and Shawn convinces his laid-back lawyer friend Jeff to defend her. On the day of the trial, Jeff proves Abby is innocent in court.

In 2013, the clinic Abby worked at closes, and she organizes a celebration at the abandoned building in which she expresses regret for performing abortions as well as having two. The closing captions say that Abby continues to work with the ministry "And Then There Were None", helping other abortion clinic workers leave and find employment elsewhere.

== Accuracy of portrayal ==
Several outlets—including Variety, The Globe and Mail, The Guardian, and the Toronto Sun—described the film as "propaganda".

The New York Times reported on an evaluation of the film's first scene:

In that first scene, teased in the trailer and on posters as "the moment that changed everything", Abby, played by Bratcher, witnesses an ultrasound-guided termination of a pregnancy at 13 weeks. The ultrasound, as depicted onscreen, shows a fetus with a discernible head, torso and limbs frantically squirming away from a doctor's probe—an action that Abby later describes as "twisting and fighting for its life"—before being liquefied by suction.

Given a description of this scene, Jennifer Villavicencio, a fellow with the nonpartisan American College of Obstetricians and Gynecologists who performs ultrasound-guided abortions but has not seen the film, said that while an ultrasound of a 13-week-old fetus may show a visible head and body, the notion that it would be "fighting for its life" is misleading.

"If you watch an ultrasound, certainly there is movement, but it's not kicking its legs or recoiling", said Villavicencio. She noted broad scientific consensus that fetuses cannot experience pain, and therefore would not recoil from it, until well after 13 weeks. "There is no neurological capability for awareness of danger—that part of the brain is simply not there yet", she said.

Villavicencio explained to the HuffPost that most abortions last three to ten minutes and are "well tolerated".

The film has been criticized for uncritically portraying events as Johnson claims they occurred in spite of a variety of journalists casting doubt on the veracity of her account. Johnson stated that the patient whose abortion led to her decision to leave Planned Parenthood was a black woman. Based on reporting by Texas Monthly (which relied on Planned Parenthood clinic records), only one patient served by Johnson's then-employer on September 26, 2009, was black, and she was in the sixth week—not the 13th week—of her pregnancy.

The film depicts Planned Parenthood as promoting abortion for the sake of profit. A character, Cheryl (Robia Scott), claims that Planned Parenthood makes its money off of abortions the way that fast food restaurants make money by selling French fries and soda.

Anna North of Vox criticized the film for depicting abortion as very dangerous, noting that within the United States, it is significantly safer than childbirth.

== Cast ==
- Ashley Bratcher as Abby Johnson
- Brooks Ryan as Doug
- Robia Scott as Cheryl
- Jared Lotz as Shawn
- Emma Elle Roberts as Marilisa
- Robin DeMarco as Kathleen
- Robert Thomason as Mike
- Tina Toner as Renee
- Sarah Hernandez as Elena
- Maura Corsini as Megan
- Lezl Gonzales as Taylor
- Kaiser Johnson as Jeff
- Andee Grace Burton as Grace
- Alexander Kane as Mark
- Stacey Bradshaw as Karen
- Mike Lindell as Foreman

== Production ==
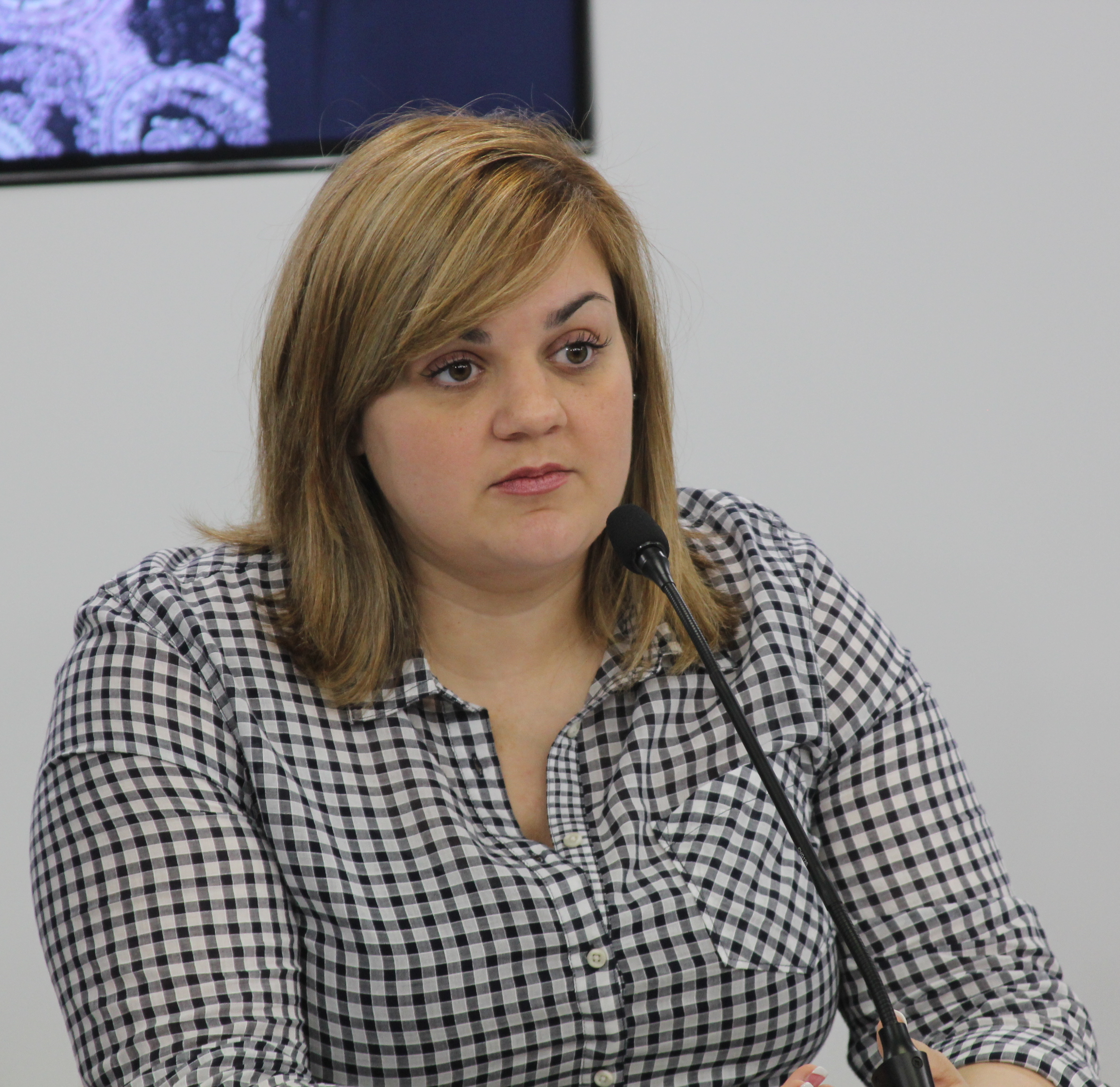
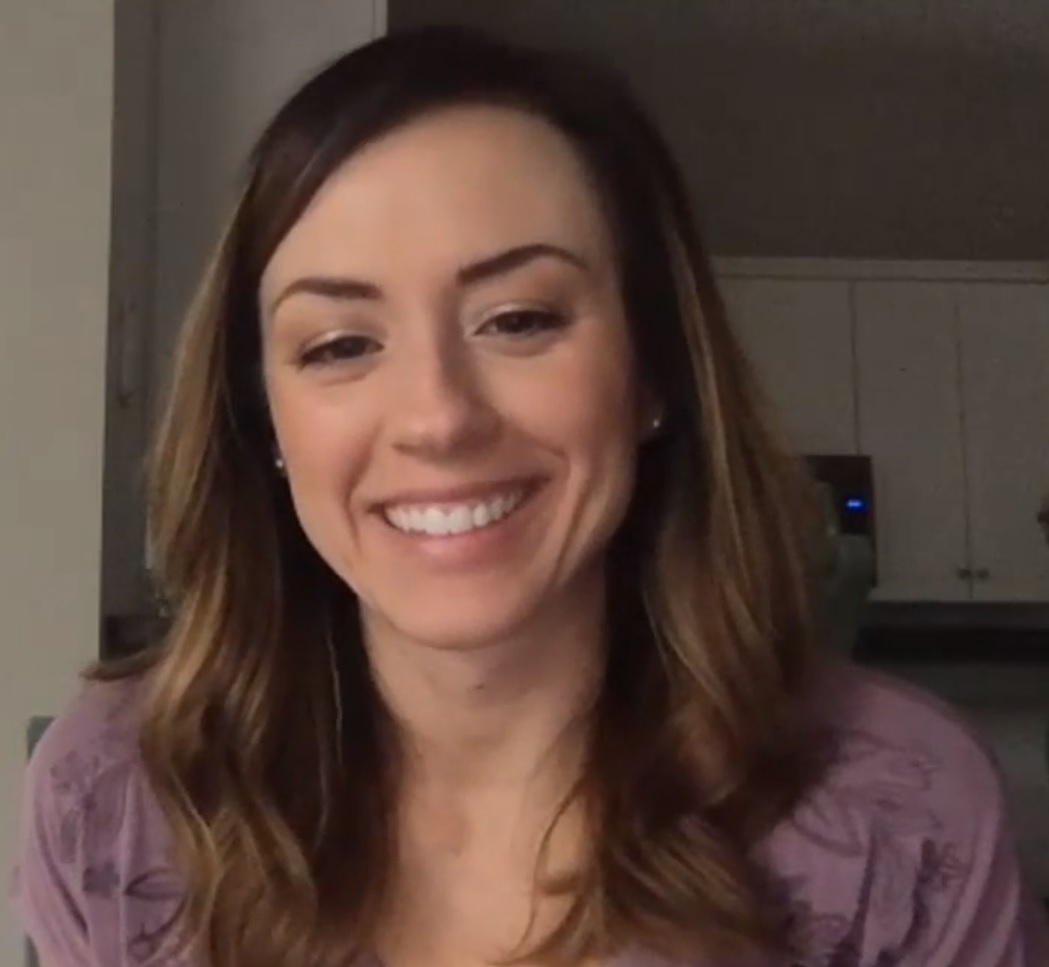
Abby Johnson (left or top) is portrayed in the film by Ashley Bratcher (right or bottom).

In September 2018, it was announced that principal photography on a new Pure Flix film with a working title of Redeemed had been completed. Out of fear for potential protests due to the subject matter, everyone involved with the project signed a confidentiality agreement, whereby they agreed not to engage in social media posts about the film nor any press interaction. Additionally, the film was secretly shot in Stillwater, Oklahoma.

Based on Johnson's memoir of the same name, Unplanned was produced on a $6 million budget. Mike Lindell, founder and owner of My Pillow, was a major backer of the film, contributing $1 million to production and having a cameo.

Directors Chuck Konzelman and Cary Solomon sent a draft of their script to Johnson for review. Upon reading, Johnson reacted, "I read the script. And in the first 15 pages, I hated me. Then I got to the end of the script, and I loved it. It was me!" During casting, producers warned potential cast members that their participation in the film might result in their not getting future roles in the film industry due to the film's subject matter. Unlike the upcoming Roe v. Wade – which had some crew who quit once they learned of the film's subject matter – Unplanned did not suffer from the same fate since those involved knew about the film's focus when hired.

Music labels denied the rights to use such songs as The Fray's "How to Save a Life", "Girls Just Want to Have Fun" by Cyndi Lauper, One Direction's "Story of My Life", Oingo Boingo's "Dead Man's Party" and "The Guardian Suite" by Trevor Rabin. Christian singer Matthew West wrote a song for the film called "Unplanned", posting its music video a week before the film's release.

== MPAA rating ==
Unplanned was given an R rating (the first for any Pure Flix film) by the Motion Picture Association of America (MPAA), with the rating descriptor being "for some disturbing/bloody images", citing the graphic abortion-related scenes as the reason for the rating, and notified the film's producers that it would remain R-rated unless those scenes were removed. The MPAA denied allegations that it had assigned the rating due to political bias. Pure Flix, which had been expecting a PG-13 rating, decided not to contest the MPAA's action due to concerns that such conflict could delay the film's release.

In response to the film's rating, the MPAA was sent a complaint signed by twenty-nine people uninvolved in the production of the film. The signers include former Arkansas governor Mike Huckabee, political commentator Glenn Beck, actor Kevin Sorbo, and Academy Award-winning film producers Gerald R. Molen and Gray Frederickson. Despite this, the MPAA did not revoke the rating, saying that "[t]he filmmakers did not make use of the rating appeal process."

Johnson subsequently wrote an open letter addressed to parents, stating that the film contained no nudity, sex or profanity. A second open letter, signed by the same twenty-nine people from the MPAA complaint, encouraged faith communities to ignore the rating and turn out for the film as they did for The Passion of the Christ, another religious movie that received controversy from the evangelical community for receiving an R rating for its graphic violent content.

== Release ==
=== United States ===
Unplanned was released in the United States on March 29, 2019. The film received a pre-screening on February 21, 2019, in lower Manhattan, and again on March 28, 2019, in Indiana, one day before its release date.

Many media outlets declined to air advertising for the film on account of the controversial subject matter and/or the film's R rating, including A&E Networks, Discovery, Inc., Hallmark Channel, NBCUniversal, and Christian radio network K-Love. Only Fox News (who also did editorial coverage of the production) and the Christian Broadcasting Network agreed to air ads.

During the opening weekend, the film's official Twitter account was suspended (reportedly because it was linked to another account that violated Twitter's code of conduct). It was soon reinstated, gaining thousands of additional followers within several hours, with the follower count briefly appearing to shoot up as high as 200,000. Twitter was then accused of dropping followers of the film's account from over 200,000 to approximately 16,000. US senator Josh Hawley accused Twitter of censoring conservative views, and in a letter to Twitter CEO Jack Dorsey, requested that an outside independent audit be made into Twitter's speech policies. Twitter responded and "said follower counts can often take up to 24 hours to stabilize following a suspension and that any issues with page follows should also be resolved shortly"; the next day, according to Newsweek, "the official account for the film appeared to confirm Twitter's statement" in a tweet.

Mark Cavaliere, an executive director of a local Coalition for Life, dressed in a 40 Days for Life shirt like those seen in the film and recruited volunteers at some showings.

=== Canada ===
No distributors in Canada were initially interested in the film, which prevented movie theaters from picking it up. In June 2019, the small distribution company Cinedicom agreed to make it available to the Canadian market, its president stating the decision to distribute the film was based on divine inspiration. The producers accused Canada's dominant movie theater chain Cineplex Entertainment of effectively banning the film in the country by not showing it in its theaters. The company usually only considers films if their distributor presents a marketing plan and obtains a rating from a provincial ratings board. Christian activist Faytene Grasseschi participated in organizing a petition threatening to boycott Cineplex unless it agreed to screen the film.

Cineplex later reversed its decision, opting to show the film in 14 locations. The competing chain Landmark Cinemas also show the film at 10 locations. Released onn July 12, 2019, the film took in $352,000 during its opening weekend, with the screen count variously reported as 49 or 56. Unplanned made $643,000 CAD at the Canadian box office in its one week of release.

=== Philippines ===
Unplanned premiered exclusively in SM Supermalls cinemas in the Philippines on August 21, 2019. Felicidad Tan-Sy, the widow of SM founder Henry Sy, cried during its local premiere and stated that "Every Filipino, every person needs to see this movie."

Unplanned was released on DVD and Blu-ray in August 2019.

== Reception ==
=== Box office ===
Unplanned grossed $19 million in the United States and Canada, and $2.3 million in other territories, for a worldwide $21.3 million, against a production budget of $6 million.

In the United States, Unplanned was released alongside The Beach Bum and Dumbo, and based upon tracking was projected to gross $3–5 million from 1,060 theaters its opening weekend. The film made $3 million on its first day, including $700,000 from Thursday night previews. The film played best in conservative-leaning states in the Midwest and South. Audiences polled by CinemaScore gave the film a rare average grade of "A+". Deadline Hollywood said the opening was "remarkable considering that the film was rated R [and was] boxed out from running TV spots on most major cable networks and Christian radio." It was reported that churches across the country had bought out entire screenings for the picture. In its second weekend the film was added to 456 additional theaters (for a total of 1,516) and made $3.2 million.

=== Critical response ===
On Rotten Tomatoes, the film holds an approval rating of 42% based on 24 reviews, with an average rating of 5.7/10. The site's critical consensus reads: "A dramatic approach to a hot-button topic whose agenda is immediately clear, Unplanned will only reinforce the feelings of viewers on either side of the issue." On Metacritic, the film has a weighted average score of 10 out of 100, based on seven critics, indicating "overwhelming dislike".

Religious publications were mostly positive about the film. Writing for the National Catholic Reporter, Rose Pacatte said that "Unplanned is an important film, a designation that directors hate to hear. It is not entertaining (until the cheesy lawyer shows up) but tells an emotional story with wide-ranging implications." The Deseret News's Josh Terry wrote that the film "...may not bridge the divide between the different sides of the abortion issue, but it will provide some food for thought for the undecideds", ultimately concluding that "Unplanned has room for praise and criticism." According to Catholic Herald's Sohrab Ahmari, Unplanned "reveals the culture of death that lies at the core of our secular-liberal modernity".

In contrast, The Hollywood Reporter's Frank Scheck criticized Unplanned as "proselytizing agitprop" comparable to a "basic cable television movie in its mediocre production values and subpar performances". Similarly, Owen Gleiberman of Variety said the film "isn't good drama but it's effective propaganda" and The A.V. Club's Vadim Rizov stated that "[while Unplanned] has greater technical finesse than its foundational forebears. [...] But there's not a single scene that speaks to characters with lives outside their streamlined narrative function; they're performers in a parable traced over a Chick tract, filmed with a bland competence at odds with the true perversity of the material". Writing for Arkansas Democrat Gazette, Philip Martin said that "Unplanned is a competently made film that has some moments of genuine grace and a winning lead performance by Ashley Bratcher".

The Canadian media was generally critical of Unplanned. The Globe and Mail, the Ottawa Citizen and the Toronto Sun all described the film as dishonest religious, social, and political propaganda. Christian news programs such as Salt + Light Hour were supportive of it.

=== Planned Parenthood reaction ===
Shortly before release, the American division of Planned Parenthood stated that the claims in the movie were false and that the movie promotes falsehoods.

== Soundtrack ==
A soundtrack album was released on March 22, 2019, with the title track being performed by Matthew West. Blake Kanicka, the music supervisor for Unplanned, failed in attempts to license songs from more established mainstream artists and from a half dozen of the largest music companies.

== See also ==
- Abortion in the United States
- Gosnell: The Trial of America's Biggest Serial Killer, a 2018 film about abortion provider Kermit Gosnell
- 180, a 2011 anti-abortion documentary
- The Silent Scream, a 1984 anti-abortion documentary by Bernard Nathanson describing the abortion process via ultrasound
- Roe v. Wade, a 2020 dramatization of the 1973 US Supreme Court legalization
