= Frederique van der Wal =

Dutch model

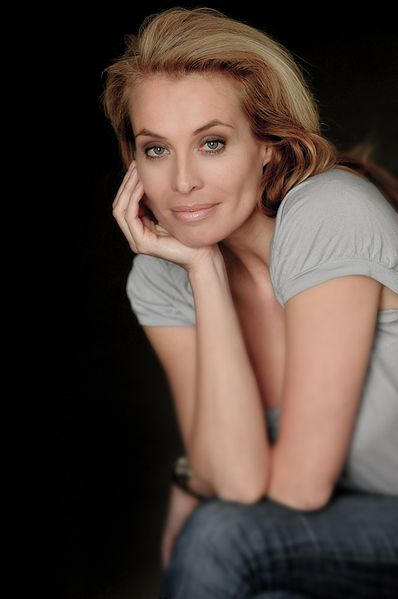
- Modeling information
- Agency: Visage Management (Zurich)

Frederique van der Wal (also Frédérique van der Wal) is a Dutch former model, actress, television personality, and a businesswoman. She is known for having appeared in Victoria's Secret and on the covers of magazines such as Cosmopolitan and Vogue.

== Career ==
Van der Wal has appeared in campaigns for Revlon, Guess, and Victoria's Secret. She has also been profiled in Forbes and InStyle.

In 2003, Van der Wal appeared in a stage production of The Vagina Monologues (Washington D.C.).

Van der Wal has produced and appeared on television programs including World Class with Frederique for the Scripts network, The Ultimate Holiday Towns USA, a two-hour special for A&E, as well as broadcasts in her native Holland. She was the "Mole" in the Hawaii celebrity edition of ABC's popular TV series, The Mole, and was the host and producer of Discovery TLC's Cover Shot, where she assembled an expert team of makeup artists and stylists to transform an everyday woman into a cover model. Van der Wal is currently a featured host on RTL 5's The Face.

Van der Wal has also been a guest lecturer at Harvard University and, in 2011, was the recipient of the Marie Claire Entrepreneur of the Year award. She has previously been involved in licensing deals carrying her name, such as a line of lingerie, sleepwear and loungewear, a bathing suit line, a workout video, a signature fragrance, and a calendar.

In 2005, her home country of Holland named a flower after her. The "Frederique's Choice Lily" was unveiled at a ceremony in Amsterdam, inspiring her to develop, produce, and host a television program called The Invisible Journey with the Discovery Channel, which traced the path of a flower from Africa's growing fields to the markets and auction houses of the Netherlands, and finally to a special event in New York City.

Subsequently, van der Wal established "Frederique's Choice," a lifestyle brand within the flower industry. In 2015, with the launch of the US unit of the business, she assumed the role of executive producer and host for the TV show titled Home Grown Makeover with Frederique and Carter. This 10-episode series aired in 2016 on AETN's FYI channel. The program transforms homes by using flowers and plants, bringing the outdoors indoors. Her business also appeared in the season finale of Germany's Next Topmodel with host Heidi Klum.

== Personal life ==
Van der Wal has a daughter with her partner Nicholas Klein, Scyler Pim van der Wal Klein. Her brother is the New York independent art advisor and curator Michiel van der Wal. She grew up in The Hague.

== Filmography ==
- 1995 - Burnzy's Last Call as Gertrude
- 1997 - Two Girls and a Guy as Carol, directed by James Toback
- 1998 - 54 as VIP Patron (cameo)
- 1998 - Celebrity as Friend of Supermodel, directed by Woody Allen
- 1999 - Wild Wild West as Amazonia, directed by Barry Sonnenfeld
- 1999 - The Venice Project as Alana/Lucrezia
- 1999 - Cosby as herself
- 2000 - The Million Dollar Hotel as Diamond Woman (cameo), directed by Wim Wenders
