= Abby Johnson (activist) =

American activist and author (born 1980)

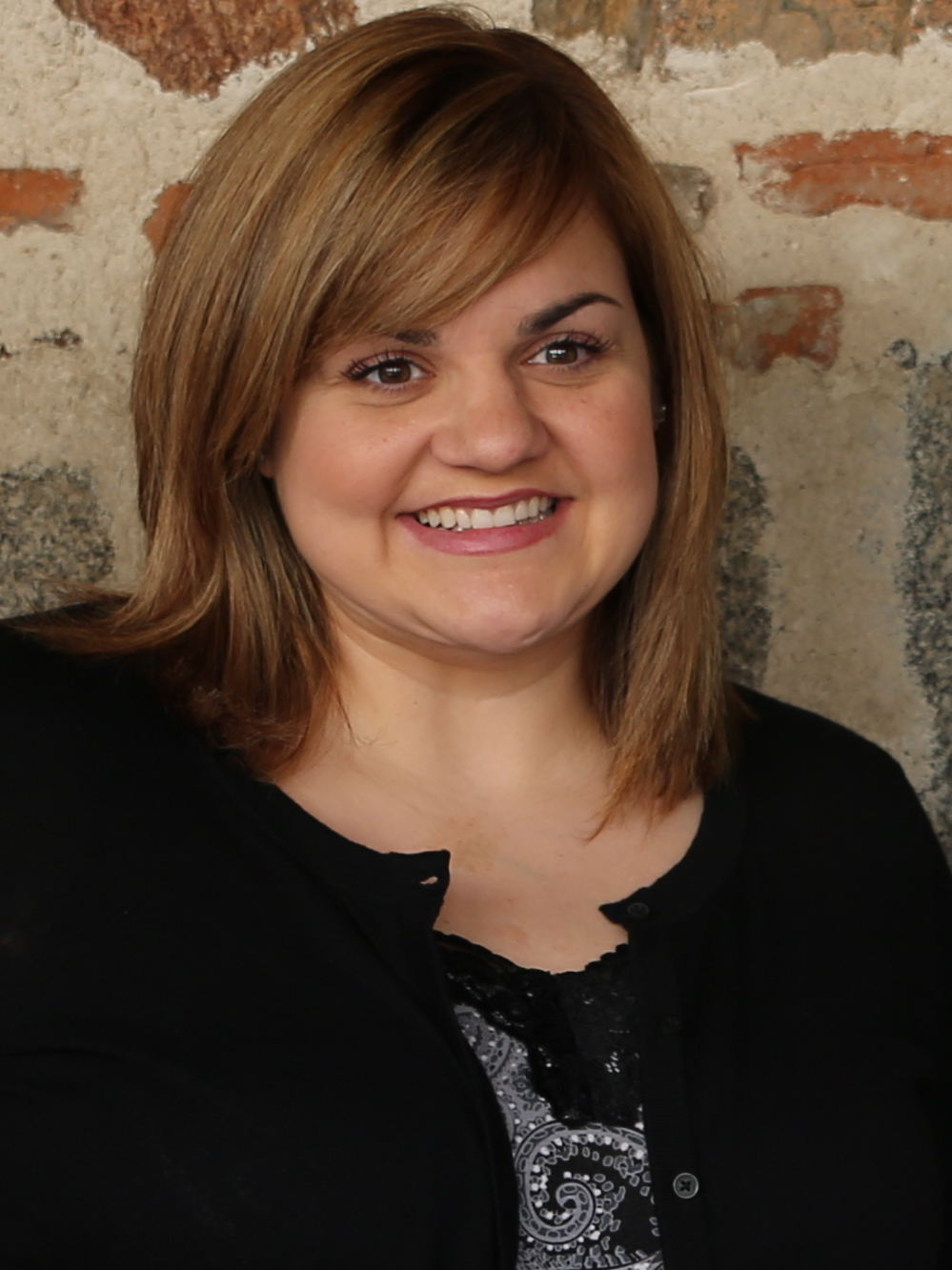
- Johnson at Spanish anti-abortion organization HazteOir in 2015.
- Born: July 11, 1980 (age 46)
- Education: Texas A&M University (BA); Sam Houston State University (MA)
- Occupations: Author; public speaker; President/Founder of And Then There Were None
- Known for: Anti-abortion activism

Abby Johnson (born July 11, 1980) is an American anti-abortion activist who previously worked at Planned Parenthood as a clinic director, but resigned in October 2009. She states that she resigned after watching an abortion on ultrasound. The veracity of her account and the details and motivation for her conversion have been challenged by investigative reporters, as medical records contradict some of her claims.

Her memoir, Unplanned, was made into the 2019 movie of the same title.

== Early life and work ==
Johnson grew up in Rockdale, Texas, and graduated from Rockdale High School. She obtained her Bachelor of Science in psychology from Texas A&M University and Master of Arts in counseling from Sam Houston State University. Although raised in a conservative family opposed to abortion, Johnson began volunteering for Planned Parenthood in 2001 after seeing their booth at a volunteer fair at her college.

Identifying as "extremely pro-choice", Johnson worked at the Planned Parenthood clinic in Bryan, Texas for eight years, escorting women into the clinic from their cars and eventually working as director of the clinic. Johnson regularly encountered activists from Coalition for Life (40 Days for Life), a local anti-abortion group which demonstrated at the clinic's fence, and described extensive harassment of clinic staff by anti-abortion activists. Johnson described death threats from anti-abortion activists against her and her family, stating: "It's very scary, this group of people that claim to be these peaceful prayer warriors, or whatever they call themselves, it's kind of ironic that some of them would be sending death threats." The Planned Parenthood clinic named Johnson employee of the year in 2008.

=== Resignation from Planned Parenthood ===
Johnson, in her description of her resignation from Planned Parenthood, says that in September 2009 she was called to assist in an ultrasound-guided abortion at thirteen weeks of gestation. She said she was disconcerted to see how similar the ultrasound image looked to her own daughter's, and said that she saw the fetus squirming and twisting to avoid the vacuum tube used for the abortion. Johnson continued working at the clinic for nine more days, but soon met with Shawn Carney, leader of the local anti-abortion group Coalition for Life, and told him she could no longer continue assisting women in getting abortions. She resigned on October 6, 2009. After her resignation, she said that her supervisors had pressured her to increase profits by performing more and more abortions at the clinic, but said that she could not produce any evidence to support her allegations, and that abortions account for 3% of all health services provided by Planned Parenthood, whose spokesperson stated that Johnson's allegations were "completely false". In a September 2009 interview, Johnson acknowledged the 3% number, but in May 2011 Johnson stated that the figure is closer to 12%, and that Planned Parenthood artificially inflates the number of "services".

In court filings, Planned Parenthood said that Johnson was put on a performance improvement plan four days before her resignation, and that she was then seen removing items from the clinic and copying confidential files and gave the home address and phone number of an abortion provider to Coalition for Life. Planned Parenthood was granted a temporary injunction against Johnson after her resignation, preventing her from speaking about her job, and the order was lifted by a court a week later. Johnson said that the performance improvement plan was due to her reluctance to increase the number of abortions performed at her facility. Johnson says she did not remove, copy, or distribute any confidential information, and writes in her book that her attorney disproved these accusations at the time that the temporary order was lifted.

Johnson's description of her conversion has been questioned by two investigative journalists in the Texas Monthly and The Texas Observer. In the Texas Monthly story, reporter Nate Blakeslee said that one day after the epiphany Johnson stated she had while watching an ultrasound guided abortion, she gave a radio interview on a feminist program in which she was enthusiastic about her clinic and critical of the 40 Days for Life protestors. Additionally, Johnson stated to Blakeslee that the woman having the abortion she witnessed was black, and thirteen weeks pregnant, yet according to the Induced Abortion Report Forms (which are required to be filed with the state of Texas), only one woman that day was black; she was in her sixth week of pregnancy, and no patient that day was more than ten weeks. According to Planned Parenthood, their records do not show any ultrasound-guided abortions performed on the date when Johnson said she witnessed the procedure, and the physician at the Bryan clinic stated that Johnson had never been asked to assist in an abortion.

Blakeslee also said that during the court hearing for Planned Parenthood's injunction, two former co-workers of Johnson testified that she was afraid she would be fired. Co-workers also testified that Johnson told them that Coalition for Life could find jobs for them, all they had to do was say they had a "moral conflict" against working at Planned Parenthood. Additionally, he states that her social media postings immediately prior to her resignation never suggested any morality qualms, only someone tired of their job and angry at their employer.

In the Texas Observer article, author Saul Elbein interviewed Johnson and two of her friends. According to Laura Kaminczak, a friend of Johnson's since graduate school who worked at a different Planned Parenthood clinic, Johnson's resignation from Planned Parenthood and conversion to anti-abortion was "completely opportunistic". Kaminczak stated that Johnson was disciplined at work because Kaminczak and Johnson had been exchanging emails with "inappropriate discussion" of their employees, for which Johnson was placed on a performance improvement plan, and Kaminczak was fired. Kaminczak also said that Johnson was not upset after seeing the abortion on ultrasound, but was excited about it because it seemed more humane than the standard procedure. Shelly Blair, another of Johnson's friends, and Kaminczak both stated that Johnson had financial problems, and was considering bankruptcy before she resigned from Planned Parenthood. Kaminczak went on to say that Johnson confided that Shawn Carney of Coalition for Life had promised her money for speaking arrangements if she converted. The author concludes with: "Johnson can't stop talking about the people who wronged her, about how hard she worked, about how little she was appreciated. She'll talk about how nasty her boss was, how her co-workers sold her out, how no one cared for the women as much as she did. She'll talk about how the progressives kicked her out of their club because she became pro-life, and how her friends dropped her, and how unfair it all is. The more she talks, the more Abby Johnson's issue with Planned Parenthood seems to be its treatment of Abby Johnson."

Johnson's story received national coverage starting in November 2009, at which point she was embraced by the anti-abortion movement and compared to Norma McCorvey, the "Jane Roe" of Roe v. Wade, the United States Supreme Court case that legalized abortion in 1973. McCorvey joined the anti-abortion movement in 1995.

== Anti-abortion activism ==
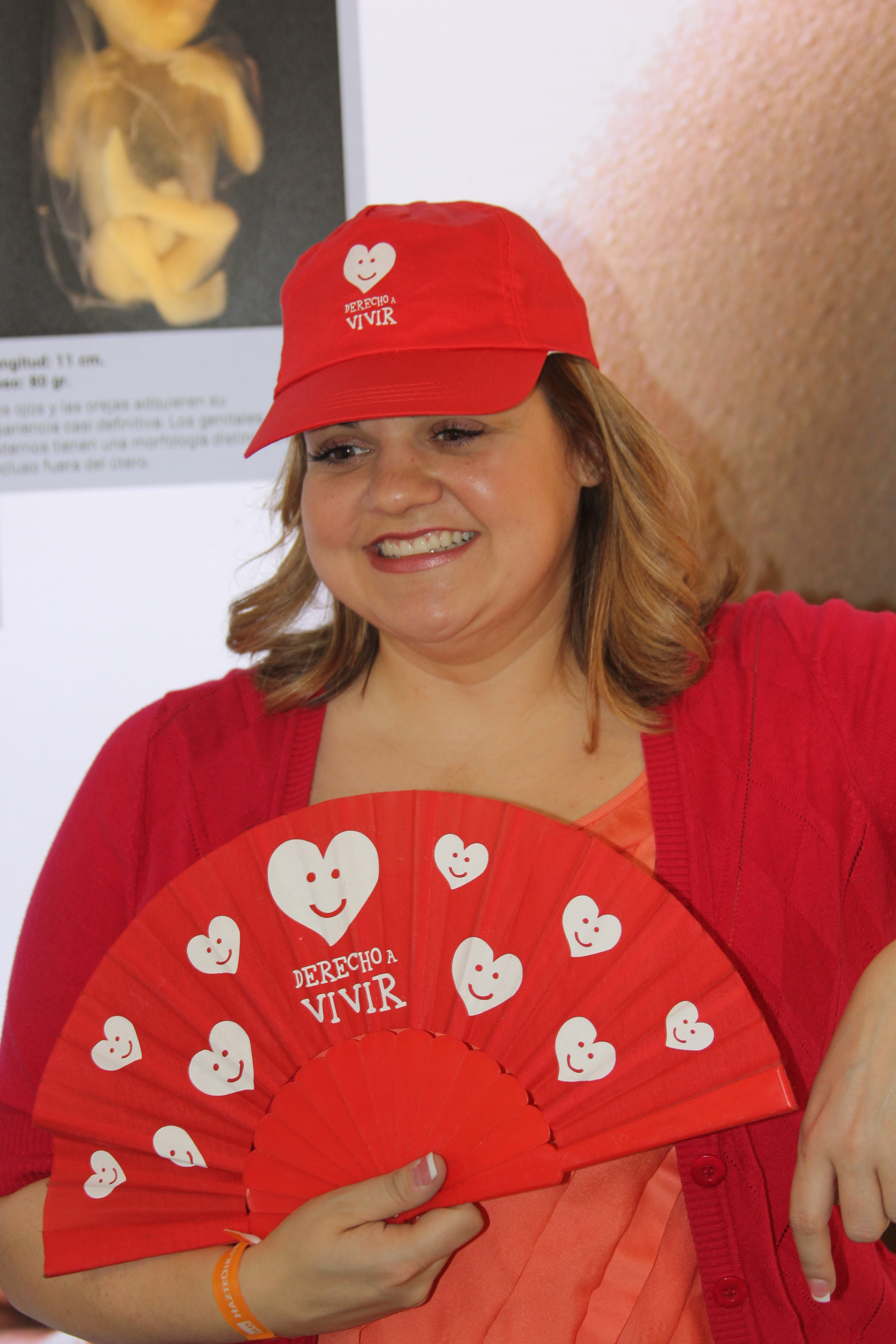
Johnson at Spanish organization HazteOir in 2015

Soon after her resignation, Johnson began volunteering with the Coalition for Life, which regularly prayed outside her former clinic. Johnson is the author of two books. Unplanned, released in January 2011, details her work at Planned Parenthood and her conversion to abortion opposition; the book is the basis for a film which was released in March 2019. The Walls Are Talking: Former Abortion Clinic Workers Tell Their Stories, released in 2016, recounts stories of former abortion workers that have come through her ministry.

Johnson runs an anti-abortion ministry, And Then There Were None (ATTWN), which lobbies abortion-clinic workers to leave the industry and which provides money and counseling for those who do. Johnson attended the 2017 Women's March, a massive protest against newly inaugurated President Donald Trump in January 2017, and she subsequently spoke at the 2020 Republican National Convention in support of Trump's re-election campaign.

== Politics ==
In the lead-up to Johnson's speech at the 2020 Republican National Convention, media attention was drawn to some of Johnson's other political views outside of her stance on abortion.

=== Household voting ===
On Twitter, Johnson advocated changing the electoral system to give each household a single vote. In response to a question about potential disagreement between husband and wife, she wrote that "in a Godly household, the husband would get the final say".

=== COVID-19 pandemic ===
Johnson stated that all Christians have a moral obligation to reject the new COVID-19 vaccines because of their potential links to abortions. (The AstraZeneca vaccine was created with fetal cells from decades-old abortions, kept alive and replicating in labs. The Pfizer and Moderna mRNA vaccines were not created with fetal cells, though fetal cells were used in development of the mRNA technology.) The U.S. Conference of Catholic Bishops (USCCB) stated that if there aren't other vaccines available, then Catholics should get vaccinated as part of their "moral responsibility for the common good". Johnson stated that the USCCB was being hypocritical and "cowering to Big Pharma", and that she intends to protest the vaccines. Johnson stated that she intends not to get a COVID-19 vaccine because she does not trust a fast-tracked approval FDA approval process, stating that she is "not anti-vaccine".

=== Comments on racial profiling ===
In August 2020, Johnson stated in a later deleted YouTube video that police would be "smart" if they racially profiled her mixed-race son and "would be more careful around my brown son than my white son". Johnson has also said, "Statistically, I look at our prison population, and I see that there is a disproportionately high number of African American males in our prison population for crimes, particularly for violent crimes. So statistically, when a police officer sees a brown man like my (son) Jude walking down the road — as opposed to my white nerdy kids, my white nerdy men walking down the road — because of the statistics that he knows in his head, that these police officers know in their head, they're going to know that statistically my brown son is more likely to commit a violent offense over my white sons." These remarks attracted controversy.

== Personal life ==
Johnson said in January 2011 that she had two abortions herself before the birth of her daughter. She lives in Texas with her husband Doug and eight children, one of whom is adopted.

Johnson was raised as a Southern Baptist, but left the church because it objected to her work at Planned Parenthood. She and her husband Doug, who was raised Lutheran, stopped attending church altogether for two years before joining the Episcopal Church, which has one of the most liberal stances on abortion of any Mainline Protestant denomination. After she went public with her conversion to the anti-abortion position, Johnson said she felt unwelcome at this church. She and her husband converted to Roman Catholicism in 2012.

== Bibliography ==
- Johnson, Abby; Lambert, Cindy (2010). Unplanned: The Dramatic True Story of a Former Planned Parenthood Leader's Eye-Opening Journey across the Life Line. Colorado Springs: SaltRiver/Focus on the Family.
  - Adapted into a 2019 movie with the same name.
- Johnson, Abby (2016). The Walls Are Talking: Former Abortion Clinic Workers Tell Their Stories. San Francisco: Ignatius Press. ISBN 978-1-58617-797-3. OCLC 936344831.

== See also ==
- Norma McCorvey
- Gianna Jessen
- Lila Rose
