= List of Christian films =

This is a list of notable Christian films. Titles are listed in alphabetical order followed by the year of release in parentheses. The month or day of release is stated if known.

== Pre-1930 ==
Title	Year	Month	Day	Director
The Birth, the Life and the Death of Christ	1906	January		Alice Guy-Blaché
From the Manger to the Cross	1912	October	3	Sidney Olcott
Civilization	1916	June	2	Thomas H. Ince, Reginald Barker, Raymond B. West
Intolerance	1916	September	5	D. W. Griffith
The Ten Commandments	1923	December	21	Cecil B. DeMille
Ben-Hur	1925	December	30	Fred Niblo
The King of Kings	1927	April	19	Cecil B. DeMille

== 1930s ==
Title	Year	Month	Day	Director
The Miracle Woman	1931	August	7	Frank Capra
The Sign of the Cross	1932	November	30	Cecil B. DeMille
The Last Days of Pompeii	1935	October	18	Merian C. Cooper, Ernest B. Schoedsack
San Francisco	1936	June	26	W. S. Van Dyke, D. W. Griffith
Boys Town	1938	September	9	Norman Taurog
Angels with Dirty Faces	1938	November	26	Michael Curtiz
The Great Commandment	1939	October	2	Irving Pichel

== 1940s ==
Title	Year	Month	Day	Director
Sergeant York	1941	July	2	Howard Hawks
One Foot in Heaven	1941	October	2	Irving Rapper
The Devil and Daniel Webster	1941	October	17	William Dieterle
Heaven Can Wait	1943	August	11	Ernst Lubitsch
The Song of Bernadette	1943	December	21	Henry King
Going My Way	1944	May	3	Leo McCarey
The Keys of the Kingdom	1944	December	15	John M. Stahl
The Picture of Dorian Gray	1945	March	1	Albert Lewin
The Bells of St. Mary's	1945	December	6	Leo McCarey
Dragonwyck	1946	April	10	Joseph L. Mankiewicz
Angel on My Shoulder	1946	September	20	Archie Mayo
Heaven Only Knows	1947	September	12	Albert S. Rogell
The Bishop's Wife	1947	December	9	Henry Koster
The Miracle of the Bells	1948	March	16	Irving Pichel
Gnana Soundari	1948	May	21	Joseph Thaliath Jr.
Gnana Soundari	1948	June	18	Murugadasa
3 Godfathers	1948	December	1	John Ford
Alias Nick Beal	1949	March	4	John Farrow
Samson and Delilah	1949	December	21	Cecil B. DeMille

== 1950s ==
Title	Year	Month	Day	Director	Country
Stars in My Crown	1950	May	11	Jacques Tourneur	United States
The Flowers of St. Francis	1950	December	14	Roberto Rossellini	Italy
The First Legion	1951	April	27	Douglas Sirk	United States
Journey Into Light	1951	September	28	Stuart Heisler	United States
Quo Vadis	1951	November	8	Mervyn LeRoy	United States
The Miracle of Our Lady of Fatima	1952	August	20	John Brahm	United States
I Confess	1953	March	22	Alfred Hitchcock	United States
Martin Luther	1953	May	8	Irving Pichel	United States; West Germany
The Robe	1953	September	16	Henry Koster	United States
Agua Bendita	1954	June	13	Paquito Bolero	Philippines
Demetrius and the Gladiators	1954	June	18	Delmer Daves	United States
Luha ng Birhen	1954	September	17	Octavio Silos	Philippines
Sign of the Pagan	1954	December	18	Douglas Sirk	United States
The Silver Chalice	1954	December	20	Victor Saville	United States
Miracle of Marcelino	1955	February	24	Ladislao Vajda	Spain
East of Eden	1955	March	9	Elia Kazan	United States
Banal o Makasalanan?	1955	March	31	Susana C. de Guzman	Philippines
Friendly Persuasion	1956	November	8	William Wyler	United States
Santa Lucia	1956	March	10	Teodorico C. Santos	Philippines
The Ten Commandments	1956	December	19	Cecil B. DeMille	United States
The Midnight Story	1957	June	4	Joseph Pevney	United States
Pitong Pagsisisi	1959	March	21	Armando Garces	Philippines
Marcelino	1959	March	25	Roy Padilla	Philippines
The Big Fisherman	1959	August	4	Frank Borzage	United States
Ben-Hur	1959	November	18	William Wyler	United States

== 1960s ==
Title	Year	Month	Day	Director	Country
Nakausap Ko ang Diyos	1960	April	4	Teodorico C. Santos	Philippines
Sa Hardin ng Diyos	1960	April	9	Mar S. Torres	Philippines
Limang Misteryo ng Krus	1960	April	14	Octavio Silos	Philippines
Elmer Gantry	1960	June	29	Richard Brooks	United States
Francis of Assisi	1961	July	12	Michael Curtiz	United States
King of Kings	1961	October	20	Nicholas Ray	United States
Jnaanasundari	1961	December	21	K. S. Sethumadhavan	India
Barabbas	1961	December	23	Richard Fleischer	Italy; United States
Pitong Kalbaryo ni Inang	1962	April	14	Jose de Villa	Philippines
Satan Never Sleeps	1962	July	12	Leo McCarey	United States
Snapaka Yohannan	1963	March	31	P. Subramaniam	India
Lilies of the Field	1963	October	1	Ralph Nelson	United States
El señor de La Salle	1964	Unknown	Unknown	Luis César Amadori	Spain
Becket	1964	March	11	Peter Glenville	United Kingdom
The Gospel According to St. Matthew	1964	September	4	Pier Paolo Pasolini	Italy; France
The Greatest Story Ever Told	1965	February	15	George Stevens	United States
The Agony and the Ecstasy	1965	October	7	Carol Reed	United States
A Man Named John	1965	August		Ermanno Olmi	Italy
7 Women	1966	January	5	John Ford	United States
A Man for All Seasons	1966	December	12	Fred Zinnemann	United Kingdom
Andrei Rublev	1966	December	16	Andrei Tarkovsky	Soviet Union (Russia)
The Shoes of the Fisherman	1968	November	14	Michael Anderson	United States

== 1970s ==
Title	Year	Month	Day	Director	Country
Our Lady of Peñafrancia (Patroness of Bicolandia)	1970	Unknown	Unknown	Romy Villaflor	Philippines
Munting Santa	1970	March	22	Artemio Marquez	Philippines
Lord Forgive Me	1970	March	26	Chiquito	Philippines
Santa Teresa de Avila	1970	December	2	Ben Feleo	Philippines
Brother John	1971	March	24	James Goldstone	United States
My Prayer	1971	April	4	Artemio Marquez	Philippines
Johnny Got His Gun	1971	May	14	Dalton Trumbo	United States
Annai Velankanni	1971	August	15	K. Thangappan	India
Ang Gangster at ang Birhen	1972	February	23	Celso Ad. Castillo	Philippines
A Thief in the Night	1972	March	22	Donald W. Thompson	United States
Pope Joan	1972	September	29	Michael Anderson	United Kingdom
Essene	1972	November	23	Frederick Wiseman	United States
Brother Sun, Sister Moon	1972	December	2	Franco Zeffirelli	Italy; United Kingdom
Father Jess	1973	April	15	Tommy C. David	Philippines
Jesus Christ Superstar	1973	August	15	Norman Jewison	United States
Godspell	1973	August	24	David Greene	United States
Jesus	1973	December	21	P. A. Thomas	India
Luther	1974	January	21	Guy Green	United States
The Abdication	1974	October	3	Anthony Harvey	United Kingdom
Thomasleeha	1975	July	19	P. A. Thomas	India
Rooster Cogburn	1975	October	17	Stuart Millar	United States
Iniibig Kita... Father Salvador	1976	May	Unknown	Pablo Santiago	Philippines
Oh, God!	1977	October	7	Carl Reiner	United States
Punitha Anthoniyar	1977	Unknown	Unknown	Nanjil Durai	India
Nite Song	1978	Unknown	Unknown	Russell S. Doughten Jr.	United States
The Pilgrim's Progress	1978	April	5	Ken Anderson	United States
Born Again	1978	September	29	Irving Rapper	United States
The Nativity	1978	December	17	Bernard L. Kowalski	United States
Karunamayudu	1978	December	21	A. Bhimsingh	India
Hermano Puli	1979	April	6	F.V. Alfon	Philippines
Jesus	1979	October	19	Peter Sykes, John Krish	United States
Christmas Lilies of the Field	1979	December	16	Ralph Nelson	United States
Christiana	1979	June	10	Ken Anderson	United States

== 1980s ==
Title	Year	Month	Day	Director	Country
Oh, God! Book II	1980	October	2	Gilbert Cates	United States
Rajadhi Raju	1980	Unknown	Unknown	Bapu	India
From a Far Country: Pope John Paul II	1981	September	9	Krzysztof Zanussi	Poland; Italy; United Kingdom
Chariots of Fire	1981	October	9	Hugh Hudson	United Kingdom; United States
Milagro sa Porta Vaga	1982	January	15	Florencio 'Pons' Orbeta	Philippines
The Hunchback of Notre Dame	1982	February	4	Michael Tuchner, Alan Hume	United States
The Scarlet and the Black	1983	February	2	Jerry London	United States; Italy; United Kingdom
Tender Mercies	1983	March	4	Bruce Beresford	United States
The Prodigal Planet	1983	Unknown	Unknown	Donald W. Thompson	United States
Oh, God! You Devil	1984	October	7	Paul Bogart	United States
Mass Appeal	1984	December	6	Glenn Jordan	United States
Kuzhandhai Yesu	1984	Unknown	Unknown	V Rajan	India
Hi-Tops	1985	Unknown	Unknown	Ernie Rettino, Debby Kerner Rettino	United States
The Fourth Wise Man	1985	March	30	Michael Ray Rhodes	United States
Hinugot sa Langit	1985	June	7	Ishmael Bernal	Philippines
Saving Grace	1986	May	2	Robert M. Young	United States
The Mission	1986	October	31	Roland Joffé	United Kingdom
Divine Mercy: No Escape	1987	September	15	Hermann D. Tauchert	United States
Au revoir les enfants	1987	October	7	Louis Malle	France; West Germany; Italy
Dayamayudu	1987	Unknown	Unknown	Vijayachander	India
Bernadette	1988	February	17	Jean Delannoy	France
Nakausap Ko ang Birhen	1988	March	24	Mike Relon Makiling	Philippines
The Seventh Sign	1988	April	1	Carl Schultz	United States
The Last Temptation of Christ	1988	August	12	Martin Scorsese	United States
To Kill A Priest	1988	September	7	Agnieszka Holland	France
Adipapam	1988	September	10	P. Chandrakumar	India
Don Bosco	1988	September	30	Leandro Castellani	Italy
Lorenzo Ruiz... The Saint... A Filipino!	1988	October	5	Maria Saret	Philippines
Jesus of Montreal	1989	May	17	Denys Arcand	Canada
Romero	1989	August	25	John Duigan	United States; Mexico

== 1990s ==
Title	Year	Month	Day	Director	Country
The Passion of Bernadette	1990	May	9	Jean Delannoy	France
Christhu Charithaya	1990	October	9	Sunil Ariyaratne	Sri Lanka
Life for Life: Maximilian Kolbe	1991	March	3	Krzysztof Zanussi	Poland
Second Glance	1992	Unknown	U	Rich Christiano	United States
Divine Mercy: Sa Buhay ni Sister Faustina	1993	March	24	Ben Yalung	Philippines
Household Saints	1993	September	15	Nancy Savoca	United States
Seasons of the Heart	1993	Unknown	U	T. C. Christensen	United States
Abraham	1993	April	3	Joseph Sargent	United States; Germany; Italy
The Visual Bible: Acts	1994	October	1	Regardt van den Bergh	United States
Jacob	1994	December	4	Peter Hall	United States; Germany; Italy
Faustina	1995	March	22	Jerzy Łukaszewicz	Poland
Mary of Nazareth	1995	March	29	Jean Delannoy	France; Belgium; Morocco
Slave of Dreams	1995	December	10	Robert M. Young	United States
Kristo	1996	March	27	Ben Yalung	Philippines
The Spitfire Grill	1996	January	24	Lee David Zlotoff	United States
Dead Man Walking	1996	January	24	Tim Robbins	United States
Ibulong Mo sa Diyos 2	1997	March	19	F.C. Gargantilla	Philippines
The Hunchback	1997	May	21	John Fasano	United States; Hungary; Canada; Czech Republic
Mother Teresa: In the Name of God's Poor	1997	October	5	Kevin Connor	United States
The Apostle	1997	December	17	Robert Duvall	United States
Gaither's Pond: The Lure Depths	1997	Unknown	U	Benjy Gaither; Amy Hayes	United States
Ama Namin	1998	April	1	Ben Yalung	Philippines
The Book of Life	1998	May	26	Hal Hartley	United States
Dorbees: Making Decisions	1998	September	8	Benjy Gaither; Scott Harper	United States
Apocalypse	1998	September	27	Robert Gerretsen	Canada
Mother Ignacia	1998	October	20	Nick Deocampo	Philippines
Molokai: The Story of Father Damien	1999	March	17	Paul Cox	Belgium
Esther	1999	March	29	Raffaele Mertes	United States; Germany; Italy
Apocalypse II: Revelation	1999	May	7	André van Heerden	United States; Canada
The Moment After	1999	July	4	Wes Llewellyn	United States
Mighty Messengers: Jonah and the Whale	1999	August	12	Benjy Gaither	United States
The Omega Code	1999	October	15	Rob Marcarelli	United States; Canada; Israel
The Soul Collector	1999	October	24	Michael M. Scott	United States
Mary, Mother of Jesus	1999	November	14	Kevin Connor	United States
Gaither's Pond: Fish Tales	1999	Unknown	U	Benjy Gaither; Scott Harper	United States

== 2000s ==
=== 2000 ===
- Apocalypse III: Tribulation (January 14)
- St. Patrick: The Irish Legend
- The Testaments of One Fold and One Shepherd (March 24)
- The Miracle Maker (March 31)
- Jesus (May 14)
- Something to Sing About (June 10)
- The Patriot (June 30)
- Left Behind: The Movie (September 4)
- Mercy Streets (October 31)
- Joseph: King of Dreams (November 7)
- Christy: Return to Cutter Gap (November 19)

=== 2001 ===
- Road to Redemption (February 16 & March 9)
- Carman: The Champion (March 2)
- Lay It Down (April 3)
- Christy: A Change of Seasons (May 13)
- Megiddo: The Omega Code 2 (September 7)
- Extreme Days (September 28)
- You Are Special (October 22)
- The Miracle of the Cards (November 10)
- Late One Night
- Gaither's Pond: The Great Divide

=== 2002 ===
- The Climb (February 22)
- Amen. (February 27)
- Joshua (April 19)
- Jonah: A VeggieTales Movie (October 4)
- Time Changer (October 25)
- Left Behind II: Tribulation Force (October 29)

=== 2003 ===
- Hermie: A Common Caterpillar (January 4)
- Magnifico (January 29)
- Ben Hur (February 15)
- Gods and Generals (February 21)
- The Gospel of John (March 18)
- Bells of Innocence (April 6)
- Love Comes Softly (April 13)
- The Light of the World (October 3)
- Luther (October 30)
- Christmas Child (November 9)
- Shortcut to Happiness
- A Wobots Christmas (December 17, 2003)
- The 3 Wise Men (December 19)
- Yesu Mahimalu
- The Legend of the Sky Kingdom
- Gaither's Pond: The Legend at Gaither's Pond

=== 2004 ===
- The Passion of the Christ (February 25)
- Joshua and the Promised Land (April 25)
- Six: The Mark Unleashed (June 29)
- Saint John Bosco: Mission to Love
- Love's Enduring Promise (November 20)
- Father of Mercy
- Davey and Goliath's Snowboard Christmas (December 19)
- The Pilgrim's Progress (December 31)
- Livin' It
- Shanti Sandesham

=== 2005 ===
- Noah’s Ark Story of the Biblical Flood (February 1)
- Birhen ng Manaoag
- The Gospel (October 7)
- Left Behind: World at War (October 21)
- The Perfect Stranger (October 28)
- Joyeux Noël (November 9)
- Into Great Silence (November 10)
- Barabbas
- Mulla Kireetam

=== 2006 ===
- Sister Aimee: The Aimee Semple McPherson Story (January 8)
- End of the Spear (January 20)
- Hidden Places (January 28)
- The Second Chance (February 17)
- Prince Vladimir (February 23)
- The Visitation (February 28)
- God Help Me (July 13)
- Unidentified (August 18)
- Livin' It LA (September 1)
- Jesus Camp (September 15)
- Amazing Grace (September 16)
- Facing the Giants (September 29)
- Love's Abiding Joy (October 6)
- A Christmas Journey: About the blessings God gives (October 10)
- One Night with the King (October 13)
- Secret of the Cave (October 20)
- Color of the Cross (October 27)
- Faith Like Potatoes (October 27)
- The Genius Club (October 27)
- The Island (November 23)
- The Nativity Story (December 1)
- Nacho Libre (June 16)

=== 2007 ===
- The Ultimate Gift (March 9)
- Love's Unending Legacy (April 7)
- Secret Sunshine (May 23)
- Evan Almighty (June 22)
- Noah's Ark (July 5)
- Saving Sarah Cain (August 19)
- St. Giuseppe Moscati: Doctor to the Poor
- The Prodigal Trilogy (October 17)
- The Ten Commandments (October 19)
- Noëlle (December 7)
- The Christmas Miracle of Jonathan Toomey
- Love's Unfolding Dream (December 15)

=== 2008 ===
- 2012: Doomsday (February 12)
- Me & You, Us, Forever (February 15)
- The Passion (March 16)
- The Sound of a Dirt Road (August 18)
- Fireproof (September 26)
- Billy: The Early Years (October 10)
- Saving God (October 18)
- Sunday School Musical (October 21)
- House (November 7)
- Pilgrim's Progress: Journey to Heaven

=== 2009 ===
- Not Easily Broken (January 9)
- Song Man (February 2)
- Like Dandelion Dust
- The Cross (March 27)
- The One Lamb (March 30)
- C Me Dance (April 3)
- Love Takes Wing (April 4)
- The Widow's Might (April 13)
- Bringing Up Bobby (May 15)
- Journey to Everest (August 20)
- Click Clack Jack: A Rail Legend (September 1)
- Love Finds a Home (September 5)
- The Lost & Found Family (September 15)
- The Secrets of Jonathan Sperry (September 18)
- The Imposter (October 12)
- Homeless for the Holidays (October 16)
- Sarah's Choice (November 1)
- To Save a Life
- The River Within (November 10)
- Birdie & Bogey (November 17)
- The Blind Side (November 20)
- The Mysterious Islands (November)
- Side Order (December 4)
- The Book of Ruth: Journey of Faith (December 15)
- A Greater Yes: The Story of Amy Newhouse (December 15)

== 2010s ==
Year	Title	Director	Country
2010	Holyman Undercover	David A. R. White	United States
2010	No Greater Love	Brad J. Silverman	United States
2010	Preacher's Kid	Stan Foster	United States
2010	Beware of Christians	Will Bakke	United States
2010	Letters to God	David Nixon	United States
2010	Leap: Rise of the Beast	Christopher Tempel	United States
2010	What Would Jesus Do?	Thomas Makowski	United States
2010	What If...	Dallas Jenkins	United States
2010	Johnny	D. David Morin	United States
2010	Standing Firm	Kyle Prohaska	United States
2010	The Genesis Code	C. Thomas Howell; Patrick Read Johnson	United States
2010	Joseph Vaz	Sanajaya Nirmal	Sri Lanka
2010	The Bill Collector	Cristóbal Krusen	United States
2010	Of Gods and Men	Xavier Beauvois	France
2010	Saint Philip Neri: I Prefer Heaven	Giacomo Campiotti	Italy
2010	The Way	Emilio Estevez	United States; Spain
2010	Upside	Ken Horstmann	United States
2010	The Way Home	Lance W. Dreesen	United States
2010	Cutback	Lance Bachelder; Johnny Remo	United States
2011	The Mill and the Cross	Lech Majewski	Poland; Sweden
2011	Prodigal	Aaron Huggett	United States
2011	Marriage Retreat	David Christiaan	United States
2011	Redemption Ride	Mike Dornbirer	United States
2011	The Grace Card	David G. Evans	United States
2011	The Tree of Life	Terrence Malick	United States
2011	The 5th Quarter	Rick Bieber	United States
2011	Soul Surfer	Sean McNamara	United States
2011	The Encounter	David A. R. White	United States
2011	The Lion of Judah	Deryck Broom; Roger Hawkins	United States
2011	Honoring a Father's Dream: Sons of Lwala	Barry Simmons	United States
2011	Dominic: Light of the Church	Marcelino Sari	Philippines
2011	Nefarious: Merchant of Souls	Benjamin Nolot	United States
2011	The Greatest Miracle	Bruce Morris	Mexico
2011	Jerusalem Countdown	Harold Cronk	United States
2011	Suing the Devil	Timothy A. Chey	Australia; United States
2011	A Mile in His Shoes	William Dear	Canada
2011	Ikaw ang Pag-ibig	Marilou Diaz-Abaya	Philippines
2011	Courageous	Alex Kendrick	United States
2011	Stand Strong	Amy Kenney	United States
2011	October Baby	Erwin brothers	United States
2011	Je m'appelle Bernadette	Jean Sagols	France
2012	Brother White	Brian Herzlinger	United States
2012	Joyful Noise	Todd Graff	United States
2012	New Hope	Rodney Ray	United States
2012	Apostle Peter and the Last Supper	Gabriel Sabloff	United States
2012	God's Country	Chris Armstrong	United States
2012	The War of the Vendée	Jim Morlino	United States
2012	Monumental: In Search of America's National Treasure	Duane Barnhart	United States
2012	Mary of Nazareth	Giacomo Campiotti	Italy; Germany; Spain
2012	Blue Like Jazz	Steve Taylor	United States
2012	Hardflip	Johnny Remo	United States
2012	Cristiada	Dean Wright	Mexico
2012	Between Heaven and Ground Zero	André van Heerden	Canada
2012	Last Ounce of Courage	Darrel Campbell; Kevin McAfee	United States
2012	Abel's Field	Gordie Haakstad	United States
2012	The Encounter: Paradise Lost	Bobby Smyth	United States
2012	Unconditional	Brent McCorkle	United States
2012	The Mark	James Chankin	United States
2012	Amazing Love: The Story of Hosea	Kevin Downes	United States
2012	Strawinsky and the Mysterious House	David Hutter	United Kingdom
2012	Meant to Be	Bradley Dorsey	United States
2013	Camp	Jacob Roebuck	United States
2013	Ring the Bell	Thomas Weber	United States
2013	Different Drummers	Don Caron; Lyle Hatcher	United States
2013	Home Run	David Boyd	United States
2013	King's Faith	Nicholas DiBella	United States
2013	The Book of Esther	David A. R. White	United States
2013	Lazer Us	Mann Munoz	United States; Canada
2013	Baseball's Last Hero: 21 Clemente Stories	Richard Rossi	United States
2013	The Ultimate Life	Michael Landon Jr.	United States
2013	Unstoppable	Darren Doane	United States
2013	Alone yet Not Alone	Ray Bengston; George D. Escobar	United States
2013	Seasons of Gray	Paul Stehlik Jr.	United States
2013	Season of Miracles	Dave Moody	United States
2013	The Book of Daniel	Anna Zielinski	United States
2013	Grace Unplugged	Brad J. Silverman	United States
2013	Linsanity	Evan Jackson Leong	United States
2013	I'm in Love with a Church Girl	Steve Race	United States
2013	In the Name of God	Kevan Otto	United States
2013	Golden Mind	Josiah David Warren	United States
2013	The Christmas Candle	John Stephenson	United Kingdom; United States
2013	Pedro Calungsod: Batang Martir	Francis Villacorta	Philippines
2014	Turn Around Jake	Jared Isham	United States
2014	Ragamuffin	David Leo Schultz	United States
2014	The Perfect Wave	Bruce Macdonald	South Africa; New Zealand; Indonesia
2014	The Letters	William Riead	United States
2014	Son of God	Christopher Spencer	United States
2014	God's Not Dead	Harold Cronk	United States
2014	Noah	Darren Aronofsky	United States
2014	Heaven Is for Real	Randall Wallace	United States
2014	Moms' Night Out	Erwin brothers	United States
2014	Virtuous	Bill Rahn	United States
2014	Camp Harlow	Shane Hawks	United States
2014	Leviathan	Andrey Zvyagintsev	Russia
2014	A Long Way Off	Michael Davis; John Errington	United States
2014	Next Station, I Love You	Lee Tak-Wai	China (Hong Kong)
2014	Like a Country Song	Johnny Remo	United States
2014	Persecuted	Daniel Lusko	United States
2014	Summer Snow	Jeremy White; Kendra White	United States
2014	When the Game Stands Tall	Thomas Carter	United States
2014	Holy Ghost	Darren Wilson	United States
2014	The Identical	Dustin Marcellino	United States
2014	The Remaining	Casey La Scala	United States
2014	Believe Me	Will Bakke	United States
2014	The Song	Richard Ramsey	United States
2014	Left Behind	Vic Armstrong	United States
2014	Love Covers All	Kyle Prohaska	United States
2014	Christian Mingle	Corbin Bernsen	United States
2014	A Matter of Faith	Rich Christiano	United States
2014	23 Blast	Dylan Baker	United States
2014	Saving Christmas	Darren Doane	United States
2014	The Gospel of John	David Batty	United Kingdom; Canada; United States
2014	Exodus: Gods and Kings	Ridley Scott	United States; United Kingdom; Spain
2014	The One I Wrote for You	Andrew Lauer	United States
2015	The Gospel of Luke	David Batty	United Kingdom; Canada; United States
2015	The Gospel of Mark	David Batty	United Kingdom; Canada; United States
2015	Last Days in the Desert	Rodrigo García	United States
2015	Hoovey	Sean McNamara	United States
2015	Old Fashioned	Rik Swartzwelder	United States
2015	Joseph: Beloved Son, Rejected Slave, Exalted Ruler	Robert Fernandez	United States
2015	The Drop Box	Brian Tetsuro Ivie	United States; South Korea
2015	Do You Believe?	Jon Gunn	United States
2015	For You	Fr. Charles Sawaya	Lebanon
2015	The Ark	Kenneth Glenaan	United Kingdom
2015	Little Boy	Alejandro Monteverde	United States; Mexico
2015	Polycarp	Joe Henline	United States
2015	Beyond the Mask	Chad Burns	United States
2015	The Cokeville Miracle	T. C. Christensen	United States
2015	Felices los que lloran	Marcelo Torcida	Paraguay
2015	Alison's Choice	Bruce Marchiano	United States
2015	Faith of Our Fathers	Carey Scott	United States
2015	Princess Cut	Paul Munger	United States
2015	Catching Faith	John K.D. Graham	United States
2015	War Room	Alex Kendrick	United States
2015	A Perfect Chord	Nathan Blair; Joseph Bechor	United States
2015	Nail 32	Bill Rahn	United States
2015	Francis: Pray for Me	Beda Docampo Feijóo	Argentina
2015	90 Minutes in Heaven	Michael Polish	United States
2015	Captive	Jerry Jameson	United States
2015	Felix Manalo	Joel Lamangan	Philippines
2015	Just Let Go	Christopher S. Clark; Patrick Henry Parker	United States
2015	Full of Grace	Andrew Hyatt	United States
2015	Woodlawn	Erwin brothers	United States
2015	God's Club	Jared Cohn	United States
2016	The Gospel of Matthew	David Batty	United Kingdom; Canada; United States
2016	The Masked Saint	Warren P. Sonoda	Canada
2016	The Ten Commandments: The Movie	Alexandre Avancini	Brazil
2016	Prayer Never Fails	Wes Miller	United States
2016	Risen	Kevin Reynolds	United States
2016	Genesis	Craig S. Cunningham	United States
2016	Poveda	Pablo Moreno	Spain
2016	The Young Messiah	Cyrus Nowrasteh	United States
2016	Miracles from Heaven	Patricia Riggen	United States
2016	Eternal Salvation	Reed Simonsen	United States
2016	God's Not Dead 2	Harold Cronk	United States
2016	40 Nights	Jesse Low	United States
2016	Ignacio de Loyola	Paolo Dy	Philippines
2016	Max and Me	Donovan Cook	Mexico
2016	The Atheist Delusion	Ray Comfort	United States
2016	The Fight Within	Michael William Gordon	United States
2016	Ang Hapis at Himagsik ni Hermano Puli	Gil M. Portes	Philippines
2016	Ben-Hur	Timur Bekmambetov	United States
2016	Greater	David L. Hunt	United States
2016	Hacksaw Ridge	Mel Gibson	United States
2016	Hillsong: Let Hope Rise	Michael John Warren	United States
2016	The Promise	Terry George	United States
2016	Vanished – Left Behind: Next Generation	Larry A. McLean	United States
2016	Priceless	Ben Smallbone	United States
2016	I'm Not Ashamed	Brian Baugh	United States
2016	Tell the World	Kyle Portbury	Australia; Canada; United States
2016	David and Goliath	Wallace Brothers	United States
2016	New Life	Drew Waters	United States
2016	Joseph & Mary	Roger Christian	Canada
2016	Hero of Auschwitz: The Life Story of St. Maximilian Kolbe	Jessy Maria	India
2016	Until Forever	Michael Linn	United States
2016	Silence	Martin Scorsese	United States
2016	Believe	Billy Dickson	United States
2017	The Messengers	Robert Fernandez	United States
2017	Faith's Song	Frank Hutto	United States
2017	The Resurrection of Gavin Stone	Dallas Jenkins	United States
2017	Is Genesis History?	Thomas Purifoy	United States
2017	The Shack	Stuart Hazeldine	United States
2017	Slamma Jamma	Timothy A. Chey	United States
2017	Coming Home	Layne McDonald	United States
2017	The Case for Christ	Jon Gunn	United States
2017	Champion	Judd Brannon	United States
2017	Redemption Way	Dan Gremley; Brad Podowski	United States
2017	All Saints	Steve Gomer	United States
2017	Chasing the Star	Bret Miller	United States
2017	Because of Gracia	Tom Simes	United States
2017	Altar Egos	Sean Morgan	United States
2017	A Question of Faith	Kevan Otto	United States
2017	Network of Freedom	Pablo Moreno	Spain
2017	Same Kind of Different as Me	Michael Carney	United States
2017	Let There Be Light	Kevin Sorbo	United States
2017	I Believe	Juergen Peretzki; Stacey Peretzki	United States
2017	The Star	Timothy Reckart	United States
2017	Genesis: Paradise Lost	Ralph Strean	United States
2018	Samson	Bruce Macdonald	United States; South Africa
2018	Like Arrows	Kevin Peeples	United States
2018	Run the Race	Chris Dowling	United States
2018	Tortured for Christ	John Grooters	United States
2018	I Can Only Imagine	Erwin brothers	United States
2018	Mary Magdalene	Garth Davis	United States; United Kingdom; Australia
2018	Paul, Apostle of Christ	Andrew Hyatt	United States
2018	God's Not Dead: A Light in Darkness	Michael Mason	United States
2018	Come Sunday	Joshua Marston	United States
2018	Pope Francis: A Man of His Word	Wim Wenders	France; Germany; Italy; Switzerland
2018	An Interview with God	Perry Lang	United States
2018	Beautifully Broken	Eric Welch	United States
2018	God Bless the Broken Road	Harold Cronk	United States
2018	Unbroken: Path to Redemption	Harold Cronk	United States
2018	Little Women	Clare Niederpruem	United States
2018	Indivisible	David G. Evans	United States
2018	Amazing Grace	Sydney Pollack	United States
2019	Harriet	Kasi Lemmons	United States
2019	The Least of These: The Graham Staines Story	Aneesh Daniel	United States
2019	The Christ Slayer	Nathaniel Nose	United States
2019	Play the Flute	Rich Christiano	United States
2019	The Road to Knock	Alan Field	United Kingdom
2019	Walk. Ride. Rodeo.	Conor Allyn	United States
2019	Breakthrough	Roxann Dawson	United States
2019	Love and Mercy: Faustina	Michał Kondrat	Poland
2019	Unplanned	Cary Solomon; Chuck Konzelman	United States
2019	Sunrise in Heaven	Waymon Boone	United States
2019	The Pilgrim's Progress	Robert Fernandez	United States
2019	Good Sam	Kate Melville	United States
2019	A Hidden Life	Terrence Malick	United States; Germany
2019	Otto Neururer – Hope Through Darkness	Hermann Weiskopf	Austria
2019	Overcomer	Alex Kendrick	United States
2019	The Two Popes	Fernando Meirelles	United Kingdom; United States; Italy
2019	Finding Grace	Warren Fast	United States

== 2020s ==
Year	Title	Director	Country
2020	I Still Believe	Erwin Brothers	United States
2020	I Am Patrick: The Patron Saint of Ireland	Jarrod Anderson	United States
2020	My Brother's Keeper	Kevan Otto	United States
2020	40: The Temptation of Christ	Douglas James Vail	United States
2020	Selfie Dad	Brad J. Silverman	United States
2020	Tulsa	Scott Pryor; Gloria Stella	United States
2020	Fatima	Marco Pontecorvo	Portugal; United States
2020	One Nation Under God	Lisa Arnold	United States
2020	2 Hearts	Lance Hool	United States
2020	Canaan Land	Richard Rossi	United States
2020	The Reason	Randall Stevens	United States
2021	2025: The World Enslaved by a Virus	Joshua Wesely; Simon Wesely	Germany
2021	Our Lady of San Juan, Four Centuries of Miracles	Francisco Pérez	Mexico
2021	Lamb of God: The Concert Film	Rob Gardner	United States
2021	Church People	Christopher Shawn Shaw	United States
2021	A Week Away	Roman White	United States
2021	Mystery of the Kingdom of God	Adam Smit	United States
2021	Resurrection	Ciaran Donnelly	United States
2021	The Girl Who Believes in Miracles	Richard Correll	United States
2021	Man of God	Yelena Popovic	Greece
2021	Finding You	Brian Baugh	United States
2021	Blue Miracle	Julio Quintana	United States
2021	Show Me the Father	Rick Altizer	United States
2021	The Jesus Music	Erwin brothers	United States
2021	God's Not Dead: We the People	Vance Null	United States
2021	Courageous Legacy	Alex Kendrick	United States
2021	Christmas with the Chosen: The Messengers	Dallas Jenkins	United States
2021	American Underdog	Erwin brothers	United States
2022	Redeeming Love	D.J. Caruso	United States
2022	Tyson's Run	Kim Bass	United States
2022	Father Stu	Rosalind Ross	United States
2022	Family Camp	Brian Cates	United States
2022	Strong Fathers, Strong Daughters	David de Vos	United States
2022	Honk for Jesus. Save Your Soul.	Adamma Ebo	United States
2022	Lifemark	Kevin Peeples	United States
2022	Running the Bases	Marty Roberts; Jimmy Womble	United States
2022	Legacy Peak	Aaron Burns	United States
2022	Testament: The Parables Retold	Paul Syrstad	United Kingdom
2022	Nothing Is Impossible	Matt Shapira	United States
2022	Praana	Sanjaya Nirmal	Sri Lanka
2022	Mother Teresa and Me	Kamal Musale	India
2022	Prophet	Michał Kondrat	Poland
2022	Why the Nativity?	Paul Joiner	United States
2022	Birth	Park Heung-Shik	South Korea
2022	I Heard the Bells	Joshua Enck	United States
2022	5000 Blankets	Amin Matalqa	United States
2023	Jesus Revolution	Jon Erwin; Brent McCorkle	United States
2023	Southern Gospel	Jeffrey A. Smith	United States
2023	His Only Son	David Helling	United States
2023	On a Wing and a Prayer	Sean McNamara	United States
2023	Big George Foreman	George Tillman, Jr.	United States
2023	Sound of Freedom	Alejandro Monteverde	United States
2023	The Essential Church	Shannon Halliday	United States
2023	Camp Hideout	Sean Olson	United States
2023	The Blind	Andrew Hyatt	United States
2023	Journey to Bethlehem	Adam Anders	United States
2023	Face of the Faceless	Shaison P. Ouseph	India
2023	A Law for Christmas	Simon Wesely	United States
2023	The Shift	Brock Heasley	United States
2023	Christmas with the Chosen: Holy Night	Dallas Jenkins	United States
2023	GomBurZa	Jose Lorenzo Diokno	Philippines
2024	Ordinary Angels	Jon Gunn	United States
2024	Cabrini	Alejandro Gómez Monteverde	United States
2024	Escape from Germany	T.C. Christensen	United States
2024	The Hopeful	Kyle Portbury	United States, Australia, Canada
2024	Unsung Hero	Richard L. Ramsey; Joel Smallbone	United States
2024	Diego de Pantoja, SJ: A Bridge between China and the West	Jesús Ramón Folgado García	United States
2024	Possum Trot	Joshua Weigel	United States
2024	The Forge	Alex Kendrick	United States
2024	Conclave	Edward Berger	United Kingdom; United States
2024	Lucy and the Lake Monster	Richard Rossi	United States
2024	The Best Christmas Pageant Ever	Dallas Jenkins	United States
2024	Mary	D. J. Caruso	United States
2025	I Am Living Proof	Bob Maddux	United States
2025	Bright Sky	Spencer Folmar	United States
2025	The Unbreakable Boy	Jon Gunn	United States
2025	The King of Kings	Seong-ho Jang	United States
2025	Leap: A Tale of the Last Days	Christopher Tempel	United States
2025	Wake Up Dead Man	Rian Johnson	United States
2025	Soul on Fire	Sean McNamara	United States
2025	Sarah's Oil	Cyrus Nowrasteh	United States
2025	Nasaan si Hesus?	Dennis Marasigan	Philippines
2025	David	Phil Cunningham; Brent Dawes	United States
2026	Moses the Black	Yelena Popovic	United States
2026	I Can Only Imagine 2	Andrew Erwin; Brent McCorkle	United States

== Upcoming ==
Title	Director	Country
American Martyr: The Stanley Rother Story	Derek Watson	United States
The Way of the Wind	Terrence Malick	United States
The Triumph of the Heart	Anthony D'Ambrosio	United States
The Resurrection of the Christ: Part One	Mel Gibson	United States
The Resurrection of the Christ: Part Two	Mel Gibson	United States
G.O.D.Tech	David John Jeffery	United States
A Life of Jesus	Martin Scorsese	United States
Take Time to Dance	Dave Christiano	United States

== See also ==
- List of Christian animations
- List of Christian video games
- Christian film industry
- List of Christian film production companies
- The Bible in film
- List of films based on the Bible
- List of actors who have played Jesus
- The Chosen (TV series)
- Conclave
