= Robert Pralgo =

American actor (born 1966)

- Born: June 4, 1966 (age 59); The Bronx, New York, U.S.
- Occupation: Actor
- Years active: 1994–present
- Website: http://www.robertpralgo.com/

Robert Pralgo (born June 4, 1966) is an American actor.

Pralgo was born in the Bronx in New York City. He graduated with a "BA Television and Film Production" at the University of Georgia in 1989. After graduation, he worked as a bartender while attending acting classes at Atlanta and a few years later, he moved to Los Angeles where he continued with his studies in the field of acting. He started to appear in hearings and agents in Atlanta and got his first works in advertising, video and television series with Houghton Agency.

== Filmography ==
Year	Title	Role	Director	Notes
1994	Stickfighter	Robert Reves	BJ Davis	
1994	Matlock	Paul Retzke	Christopher Hibler	TV Series (1 Episode)
1995	All My Children	Maitre'd Valley Inn	Conal O'Brien	TV Series (3 Episodes)
1996	Beat Daddies	Beat Poetry MC	James Kanter	
1996	Baywatch Nights	Eddie	Georg Fenady	TV Series (1 Episode)
1998	The Waterfront	Mobster	Jesse Dell & John M. Sjogren	
2001	Going to California	Vance Clarington	John Asher	TV Series (1 Episode)
2002	Blood Bath	Jack Hess	William McDaniel	Also Casting Director
2002	Epiphany	Paul Trulli	Jim Hunter	Short
2003	A Conspiracy	Peter Walsh	Rick Jordan	
2003	Vicious	Steve	Matt Green	
2003	Identity Crisis	Inspector Alan Goddard	Les Rayburn & Les Rayburn Jr.	Short
2003	Dawson's Creek	Cute Guy	James Whitmore Jr.	TV Series (1 Episode)
2004	Bobby Jones: Stroke of Genius	Reporter	Rowdy Herrington	
2004	Last Goodbye	Odesky	Jacob Gentry	
2004	Delivery Boy Chronicles	Chad	Stacey Childers	
2005	Shooting Gallery	Robert Hudson	Keoni Waxman	
2005	Battaglia	Thomas Carter	Owen Smith	Short
2005	One Tree Hill	Attorney	Michael Lange	TV Series (1 Episode)
2006	The Feeding	Jack Driscoll	Paul Moore	
2007	Blood Ties	Jim Davis	Kely McClung	Also Writer, Casting Director & Executive Producer
2007	The Promise	Charles Brown	Shandra L. McDonald	Short
2007	The Honored	Reverend	James Magliocca	Short
2007	Prison Break	Agent Holdrich	Dwight H. Little	TV Series (1 Episode)
2007	House of Payne	Officer	Tyler Perry	TV Series (1 Episode)
2007	Army Wives	Sgt. George Polarski	John T. Kretchmer & Jeff Melman	TV Series (3 Episodes)
2008	Crystal River	Paul Nance	Brett Levner	
2008	Rex	Bar Drunk	Christopher L. Miller	
2008	Keepsake	TTD	Paul Moore (2)	
2008	Precious Cargo	Jack	Max Adams	Short
2008	Waking Up	Bearded Man	Micah Ranum	Short
2008	Harvest Moon	Walter	Micah Ranum (2)	Short
2008	First Kill	Rayburn	Micah Ranum (3)	Short
2009	The Joneses	Alex Bayner	Derrick Borte	
2009	The Blind Side	Lemming's Associate	John Lee Hancock	
2009	12 Rounds	Camouflaged Agent	Renny Harlin	
2009	Savage	Mitchell	Jordan Blum	
2009	Love Fever	Stan	Michele Grey & William Schweikert	
2009	I Am the Bluebird	Charles Galloway	Thomas Verrette	Short
2009	The Mandala Maker	Art Professor Wade	Sam Borowski	Short; Also Associate Producer
2009	My Fake Fiancé	Ben	Gil Junger	TV Movie
2009	Acceptance	Ari	Sanaa Hamri	TV Movie
2009	One Tree Hill	Frank	Peter B. Kowalski	TV Series (1 Episode)
2009	Drop Dead Diva	Doctor	James Hayman	TV Series (1 Episode)
2009	High Rise	Marcus Hunt	Charles Van Eman	TV Series (14 Episodes)
2009-10	The Vampire Diaries	Mayor Lockwood	Several	TV Series (8 Episodes)
2010	Upside	Cornell Recruiter	Ken Horstmann	
2010	The Fat Boy Chronicles	Mr. Grove	Jason Winn	
2010	Exhibit A-7		Adam Minarovich	Also Producer
2010	Kerberos	Lester Armstrong	Kely McClung (2)	
2010	Pantheon Black	Leon	Fabian Rush	
2010	Tainted Blood	Hally's Dad	Martin L. Kelley	Short
2010	YardByrds	Bad Lieutenant	Jason Hawkins	Short
2010	Puppets of War	Voice	Corey Ellis, Michael Landau & Francis McDonald	Short
2010	My Super Psycho Sweet 16: Part 2	Ted Bell	Jacob Gentry (2)	TV Movie
2010	Past Life	Prosecutor Gerron	Kate Woods	TV Series (1 Episode)
2010	The Gates	Alex Dupree	David Grossman	TV Series (1 Episode)
2011	Love Thy Enemy	Captain Charles Parker	J Knorr	
2011	Take Me Out	Parker Lam	Michael H. Harper	Short
2011	Sweatshop	Ceo	Joshua Wilcox	Short
2011	The Lost Valentine	David Oliver	Darnell Martin	TV Movie
2011	Criminal Behavior	Officer Deaton	Tim Matheson	TV Movie
2011	Franklin & Bash	Reporter	Jason Ensler	TV Series (1 Episode)
2011	Single Ladies	Martin Perez	Tamra Davis	TV Series (1 Episode)
2011-15	Avengers Assemble!	Nick Fury	Chris Burns	TV Series (5 Episodes)
2012	The Collection	Doctor	Marcus Dunstan	
2012	Carl	Mike Ingram	Greg Daniel	
2012	The Great Divide	Martin	Ibrahim Yilla	
2012	A Zombie Invasion	Sheriff Long	Matt Green (2)	
2012	Perception	Murray Weideman	Stan Harrington	
2012	Remote Control		Matthew McGahren	Short
2012	Clear Revenge	Dr. Gerard	Christie Maher	TV Series (1 Episode)
2012	Teen Wolf	David Whittemore	Toby Wilkins & Russell Mulcahy	TV Series (4 Episodes)
2012	Becky & Barry	Brody Steele	Jay D. Zimmerman	TV Series (5 Episodes)
2013	Standing Up	Client	D. J. Caruso	
2013	Solace	Nolan	Vandon N. Gibbs	
2013	Remnants	Art Bernard	Tim Szczesniak	
2013	Implanted	Charles Galloway	Thomas Verrette	
2013	Reckless	Bauman	Martin Campbell	TV Movie
2013	Diggy Simmons MOW	Mr. Bartell	Salim Akil	TV Movie
2013	Witches of East End	Bill Thatcher	Allan Arkush	TV Series (1 Episode)
2013	Revolution	Captain Burke	Charles Beeson & Nick Copus	TV Series (2 Episodes)
2014	Kill the Messenger	Sheriff Nelson	Michael Cuesta	
2014	Taken 3	Cop	Olivier Megaton	
2014	Altered	The Priest	Kely McClung (3)	
2014	The Morningside Monster	Tom Haulk	Chris Ethridge	
2014	Lost Angels	Richard Steinberg	Stan Harrington	
2014	A Free Bird	Police Commander	Gregg Russell	
2014	The Semi-Hostage Incident	Robert	Jason Hawkins (2)	Short
2014	Satisfaction	Doug	Stephen Gyllenhaal	TV Series (1 Episode)
2014	Red Band Society	Black T-shirt Dude	Tricia Brock	TV Series (1 Episode)
2014-15	The Haves and the Have Nots	Professor Cannon	Tyler Perry (2)	TV Series (8 Episodes)
2015	Furious 7	Merc Tech	James Wan	
2015	Constantine	Dr. Bob Carroll	Sam Hill	TV Series (1 Episode)
2015	The Drunks	Raul	Thomas Bell	TV Series (1 Episode)
2016	Ride Along 2	Port Commissioner Nunez	Tim Story	
2017	The Yellow Birds	Frank	Alexandre Moors	
2017	The Leisure Seeker	Phillip	Paolo Virzì	
2021	Crazy 2 Crazy	James Bender	Greg Daniel	
2024	Lilly	Kent Kohler	Rachel Feldman	
