= A Different Drummer =

A Different Drummer or Different Drummer may refer to:

- A Different Drummer (album), a 1971 album by Buddy Rich
- A Different Drummer (novel), a 1962 novel by William Melvin Kelley
- Different Drummer (album), a 1987 album by Isley-Jasper-Isley
- Different Drummer (ballet), a 1984 ballet created by Kenneth MacMillan
- Different Drummers, a 2013 American film
- "Different Drummer" (Cagney & Lacey), a 1987 television episode
- "Different Drummer" (Doctors), a 2002 television episode
