= ChristianCinema.com =

Christian film production company

- Available in: English
- Creators: Kevin Downes; Bobby Downes
- Website: www.christiancinema.com
- Commercial: Yes
- Launched: 1999

ChristianCinema.com, Inc. is an independent Christian film production company as well as a distribution company, founded in 1999, by brothers Bobby Downes and Kevin Downes. In addition, the website reviews both theatrical released movies (over 6000 currently), carries news articles about Christian film and media, and often interviews filmmakers. It is also an online store for Christian films, with over 1,300 Christian-themed movies, and sells or rents digital streaming.

== History ==
ChristianCinema.com was co-founded in 1999 in Visalia, California, by brothers, Kevin (President) and Bobby Downes (CEO). They wanted to make movies and create a system for independent filmmakers to distribute their films. Bobby designed the website in the small apartment where he lived, Kevin shipped the first movie from his spare bedroom, and they produced their first movie, The Moment After, the same year. It has been shown on the Trinity Broadcasting Network, and its website gives filmmakers a place to submit screening copies of their work with the possibility of being distributed and promoted by the website. The company now has its own warehouse and 14 employees. Angela Walker (director of producer relations) sends a weekly e-newsletter with recommendations about new releases and more to over 58,000 people. Jared Geesey is the Vice President of ChristianCinema.com.

== Online store ==
ChristianCinema.com is also an online store for Christian films, and carries only Christian-oriented or family-friendly films. It calls itself "the biggest Christian movie store on the planet," with, in 2007, over 1,300 Christian-themed movies, and it sells and/or rents them worldwide. Many of ChristianCinema.com's members are churches that have weekly or monthly movie nights.

== Filmography ==
They have created, worked on, or distributed the following films:

- The Moment After (1999)
- Mercy Streets (2000)
- Lay It Down (2001)
- Time Changer (2002)
- Six: The Mark Unleashed (2003)
- The Moment After II (2006)
- The Visitation (2006)
- The List (2007)
- In Gramps' Shoes (2014)
