= Harold Cronk =

American film director

Harold David Cronk
- Born: Harold David Cronk; October 27, 1973 (age 52); Reed City, Michigan, U.S.
- Education: Central Michigan University
- Occupations: Director, producer, writer
- Known for: God's Not Dead; Mickey Matson and the Copperhead Conspiracy; Jerusalem Countdown

Harold David Cronk (born October 27, 1973) is an American writer, director and producer best known for his work in Christian films, and for being a founding partner in 10 West Studios and EMC Productions. Cronk won the Best Director award at the Beverly Hills International Film Festival in 2006. He is husband to Amy Cronk.

== Early life ==
Born in Reed City, Michigan, Cronk went to school in the Baldwin School District until about sixth grade. He then attended school in Scottville, Michigan, where he was active in the theatre department, and graduated from Mason County Central High School in 1993. Cronk graduated from Central Michigan University in 1998, with a Bachelor of Science in Art and K-12 Education.

== Career ==
Cronk taught high school art courses and was voted Teacher of the Year for two of his four years at Evart High School. When the Reed City elementary school hired another art teacher in 1998, Cronk made a point of introducing himself to the new hire, Matthew Tailford. The two teachers found that they had a lot in common: both had participated in college athletics, both had studied sculpture and both had acting experience in school.

Back then, Cronk concedes, "I didn't even know people made livings as art directors." To him, movies just appeared on the screen, almost magically. "I didn't understand that it could take hundreds of people on a movie set to make it happen."

— "Two Filmmakers Bring Michigan Movie Industry to Manistee", by Jeff Smith, April 27, 2010

In 2000, Tailford landed a job as the art director on a television pilot, Dear Doughboy. Cronk and Tailford traveled to Los Angeles to work for the show. The experience in Los Angeles motivated the pair to try their hand at producing Cronk's screenplays South Manitou and The Agent. Using their own funds, Cronk and Tailford completed the South Manitou and The Agent projects and considered the life-experience as equivalent to film school coursework. Upon completion, a film screening was set up by Compass College of Cinematic Arts with producer Ralph Winter in attendance. Winter enjoyed the film(s) and encouraged Cronk and Tailford to continue with film-making. Buoyed by the reception of the work, Cronk moved to Los Angeles in the summer of 2004. Within months of the relocation to Los Angeles, Cronk and Tailford found themselves on location in Ireland, working on the Secret of the Cave (2006), starring Kevin Novotny and Patrick Bergin, with Cronk as production designer and Tailford as art director. Other assignments followed, direction of a Magic Johnson Foundation, Lincoln Navigator commercial starring Earvin "Magic" Johnson and Cronk directed, Eve Ensler's, The Vagina Monologues, Vday West (2006) at the Ivy Substation during this time period.

Cronk and Tailford also had greater ambitions to develop their own screenplays, Cronk found that he enjoyed directing and Tailford was interested in producing and acting. With some industry experience behind them, they returned to Michigan to create a ten-minute short, War Prayer, based upon Mark Twain's short story, "The War Prayer", a controversial war-story that was embargoed by Harper's Bazaar, until six years after Twain's death. A wind-damaged stand of pine trees near Evart, Michigan served as the set and battlefield props were fashioned from junkyard remnants. After receiving several rejection notices from various film festivals, the War Prayer was accepted by the Beverly Hills International Film Festival, the festival's Best Director Award for 2006, going to Harold Cronk, came as "a total shock."

=== 10 West Studios ===
Cronk is currently the CEO of 10 West Studios. His win for Best Director at the Beverly Hills Film Festival resulted in a three-picture deal with Origin Entertainment for the studio. Cronk had already spent a year and a half on his screenplay, set in West Michigan, Mickey Matson and the Copperhead Conspiracy, a children's comedy adventure film.

== Filmography ==
Cronk directed God's Not Dead, starring Kevin Sorbo, David A. R. White and Willie Robertson. The film was Cronk's first significant box office opening, with a gross of $2.8 million on Friday (March 21, 2014), and $8.5 million for the weekend, in a limited 780 theater release.

Year	Nominee / work	Award	Result
2006	War Prayer	Best Director, Beverly Hills Film Festival	Won

Year	Film	Role	Notes	Reference
2005	Midnight Clear	Art Director	Jenkins Entertainment	
2005	The Red Veil (short film)	Production Design	Under the Fog Productions	
2005	The Agent (short film)	Co-Director	Mendicant Pictures	
2006	War Prayer (short film)	Director	10 West Productions	
2006	Secret of the Cave	Production Designer	Carmel Entertainment, School of Visual Art and design, Southern Adventist University	
2010	Tug	Set Decorator	Jumpstart Pictures, TicTock Studios	
2010	What If...	Co-producer	Jenkins Film Group	
2010	Christmas with a Capital C	Production Designer	Pure Flix Entertainment	
2010	Johnny	Associate Producer	10 West Studios, Pure Flix Entertainment	
2011	Return to the Hiding Place	Associate Producer	Spencer Productions, 10 West Studios	
2011	Jerusalem Countdown	Director, screenwriter	10 West Studios, God & Country Entertainment, Pure Flix Ent	
2012	Mickey Matson and the Copperhead Conspiracy	Director, screenwriter	10 West Studios, EMC Productions	
2013	Silver Bells	Director	Filmed in Manistee, Grand rapids and Ludington in March, 2013.	
2014	God's Not Dead	Director	Pure Flix Entertainment, Red Entertainment Group	
2016	God's Not Dead 2	Director	Pure Flix Entertainment, Red Entertainment Group	
2017	God Bless the Broken Road	Director and writer	Freestyle Releasing	
2018	Unbroken: Path to Redemption	Director	Pure Flix Entertainment	
