= Bringing Up Bobby =

Bringing Up Bobby may refer to:

- Bringing Up Bobby (2009 film), a Christian direct-to-video comedy film
- Bringing Up Bobby (2011 film), a comedy-drama film
