= Mount Paran Christian School =

Location
- 1275 Stanley Road; Kennesaw, Georgia; United States; 33°59′16″N 84°36′45″W

Information
- Type: Private, coeducational, secondary
- Established: 1976
- Grades: Pre-K3 through grade 12
- Enrollment: About 1320
- Colors: Blue, white, and black
- Mascot: Eagle

Mount Paran Christian School is a covenantal private Christian school located in Kennesaw, Georgia, United States. It includes Pre-K3 through grade 12.

== Organization ==
Mount Paran Christian School opened in 1976 as a private independent school.

== Academics ==
MPCS (Mount Paran Christian School) is accredited through Cognia and the Southern Association of Independent Schools (SAIS). Mount Paran Christian School offers a full college-preparatory program with Honors and Advanced Placement classes. MPCS incorporates art, music, computer, foreign language, and physical education as regular components of the instructional program, beginning in preschool and extending through high school.

Mount Paran Christian School offers a program for gifted students in lower school called ENCORE. Entrance into this program is based on testing and teacher recommendations. Advanced classes are offered in math and language arts for grades 3-8 and accelerated classes starting in seventh grade.

== Admission ==
Mount Paran Christian School's admissions department makes admission decisions for prospective students with the following general criteria in mind: faith commitment of the family and applicant, readiness to learn, relevant academic skills, behavioral history, self-motivation, and leadership potential.

== Sports ==
Mount Paran competes in Georgia High School Association's Region 2-A.

- Baseball
- Basketball
- Cheerleading
- Cross country
- Dance Team
- Fishing
- Flag Football
- Football
- Golf
- Lacrosse
- Soccer
- Softball
- Strength
- Swimming
- Tennis
- Track and field
- Volleyball
- Wrestling

== Murray Arts Center ==
The Murray Arts Center, bought by the school, opened in August 2008. Costing $35 million, the complex includes an 800-seat music hall, theater, dance studios and video production facilities.

== Notable alumni ==
Name	Year	Profession	Notability	Reference
Cam Collier	2022	Baseball Player	Cincinnati Reds first round draft pick	
Ken Horstmann	1990	Director	Best known for the film Upside	
Armani Moore	2012	Basketball Player	Professional basketball player who played college basketball for Tennessee	
Taylor Trammell	2016	Baseball Player	New York Yankees outfielder	
