= Darcy DeMoss =

American film and television actress (born 1963)

Darcy L. DeMoss
- Born: August 19, 1963 (age 63); Los Angeles, California
- Occupation: Actress
- Years active: 1984–present

Darcy L. DeMoss (born August 19, 1963) is an American film and television actress whose credits include Friday the 13th Part VI: Jason Lives, Eden, Erotic Confessions, Pale Blood, Stickfighter and Vice Academy 3. She played Patty in Can't Buy Me Love.

DeMoss also appeared in several Ron Harris aerobics productions during the late 1970s and early 1980s. These short productions were seen on HBO, Showtime, and NBC late-night. In 2009, 2013 and 2026, she appeared in the Friday the 13th franchise documentaries His Name Was Jason: 30 Years of Friday the 13th, Crystal Lake Memories: The Complete History of Friday the 13th and Friday the 13th: Camp Crystal Legacy.

== Filmography ==
=== Film ===
Year	Title	Role	Notes
1984	Hardbodies	Dede	
1984	Body Double	Barefoot Dancer in Nightclub	Uncredited
1984	Gimme an 'F'	Ducks Dance Squad Member	
1985	Get Out of My Room	Aerobic Girl	
1986	Friday the 13th Part VI: Jason Lives	Nikki Parsley	
1986	Reform School Girls	Knox	
1987	Return to Horror High	Sheri Haines	
1987	Can't Buy Me Love	Patty	
1989	For Keeps	Elaine	
1989	Teen Witch	Dancer	Uncredited
1989	Night Life	Roberta Woods	
1999	Coldfire	Maria	
1990	Pale Blood	Cherry	
1990	Living to Die	Maggie Sams	
1991	Vice Academy Part 3	Samantha	Uncredited
1994	Stickfighter	Michelle Madsen	
1996	Alien Abduction: Intimate Secrets	Sheri	
1996	Erotic Confessions: Volume 6	Carmela	
2007	Made in Brooklyn	Franny	
2009	Labor Pains	Redhead	
2014	666: Kreepy Kerry	Miss Price	
2014	Devilish Charm	Shopkeeper	
2016	ToY	Swanky Wife	
2020	Clown Fear	Myrtle	
2022	Friday the 13th Vengeance 2: Bloodlines	Nikki Parsley	Fan film

=== Television ===
Year	Title	Role	Notes
1988	Full House	Jill	Episode: "Half a Love Story"
1988	Perfect People	Janet	Television film
1989	Days of Our Lives	Sylvie	Episode #1.5962
1989	I Know My First Name Is Steven	Debbie	2 episodes
1990	The Bradys	Donna	Episode: "The Brady 500"
1993	Eden	Randi Banks	Episode: "Pilot"
1994	Up All Night	Darcy	2 episodes
1994	NYPD Blue	Denise	Episode: "For Whom the Skell Rolls"
1994	Hardball	Annie	Episode: "My Name Is Hard B."
1995	A Bucket of Blood	Alice	Television film
1996	Erotic Confessions	Various roles	2 episodes
1998	Mad About You	Mandy	Episode: "Fire at Riff's"
2015	Sharknado 3: Oh Hell No!	Airman #1	Television film
