= Mickey Matson and the Copperhead Conspiracy =

- Official poster
- Directed by: Harold Cronk
- Written by: Harold Cronk
- Produced by: Harold Cronk; Matthew Tailford; Edgar Struble
- Starring: Derek Brandon; Francesca DeRosa; Patrika Darbo; Christopher Lloyd; Lee Arenberg; Ernie Hudson
- Cinematography: Philip Roy
- Edited by: Dustin Soloman
- Music by: Will Musser
- Production company: 10 West Studios
- Release dates: May 10, 2012 (Grand Rapids, Michigan)
- Running time: 101 minutes
- Country: United States
- Language: English

Mickey Matson and the Copperhead Conspiracy is a 2011 American family adventure-comedy film written and directed by Harold Cronk. It deatures the descendants of a treasonous band of Civil War villains known as Copperheads who serve as the antagonists. The film's primary artifact is a Petoskey stone, which is also the state stone of Michigan.

== Plot ==
The film's protagonist, young Mickey Matson (Derek Brandon), discovers a map encoded upon a Petoskey stone left to him by his late Grandpa Jack (Christopher Lloyd). The adventure, taking Mickey Matson and Sully Braginton (Francesca DeRosa) from one clue to the next as they summon the courage to prevent the destruction of home and country. Plot development includes flashback scenes to the Lincoln presidential era and the Civil War.

== Cast ==
- Derek Brandon as Mickey Matson (known for Rodeo Girl)
- Francesca DeRosa as Sully Braginton
- Patrika Darbo as Grams
- Christopher Lloyd as Grandpa Jack
- Ernie Hudson as Ivan Stumpwater
- Lee Arenberg as Billy Lee
- Frank Drank as Jeremiah
- Kevin Yon as Buckshot Plindenberg
- Rick Plummer as Stalwart Priggish III

== Production ==
Based on an original story conceived by director Harold Cronk, Mickey Matson and the Copperhead Conspiracy was approved for a Michigan film industry incentive award. Primarily filmed at 10 West Studios in Manistee, Michigan, location landmarks in Mickey Matson and the Copperhead Conspiracy include the Ramsdell Theatre in Manistee and White Pine Village in Ludington.

=== Soundtrack ===
Composer Will Musser provided the score for Mickey Matson and the Copperhead Conspiracy including three titled works. Sara Niemietz, Edgar Struble, and Tom Stype wrote the song, "Never On My Own". Engineered, mixed and mastered by Luke Rangel, Sara Niemietz performed "Never On My Own" for the closing credits.

Soundtrack list: Mickey Matson and the Copperhead Conspiracy
No.	Title	Writer(s)	Performers	Length
1.	"Patriots"	Will Musser	Instrumental
2.	"Main Theme" (Opening credits?)	Will Musser	Instrumental
3.	"Copperheads"	Will Musser	Instrumental
4.	"Never On My Own" (Closing credits)	Sara Niemietz, Edgar Struble, Tom Stype	Sara Niemietz

== Release ==
Mickey Matson and the Copperhead Conspiracy held a red carpet premier on May 10, 2012 at the Celebration! Cinema Grand Rapids North, in Grand Rapids, Michigan.

=== Home media retitle ===
For the DVD release on July 16, 2013, Walmart retailing personnel suggested changing the film name to The Adventures of Mickey Matson and the Copperhead Treasure, advising that the term, "Treasure" would be more clearly understood by younger viewers than the term, "Conspiracy". It was also suggested, "The Adventures of..." be added to the title for higher visibility, keying on the word "Adventure" would categorize the film under "A" in digital listings. The film's writer and producer, Harold Cronk commented, "...We’re not arrogant enough to think we know more than the largest retailer on the planet Earth. We like to work with people. We think it’s going to be a great partnership.”

== Reception ==
The Dove Foundation gives Mickey Matson and the Copperhead Conspiracy a four Dove rating, the film is "Dove Family-Approved, Suitable for all ages". ChristianCinema.com movie reviewer, Edwin L. Carpenter writes: "This movie is a delightful journey into the imagination! When you have a story which has its roots in President Lincoln and the Civil War, a boy and a girl, bad guys, a quest for three elements which could cause great harm, and the wonderful Christopher Lloyd as Grandpa Jack, what's not to like?"

== Sequel ==
A sequel to the film, Pirate's Code: The Adventures of Mickey Matson, was released on October 16, 2014 and distributed by Pure Flix. Like its predecessor, the movie was also given a retitling for its home media release, which was The Adventures of Mickey Matson and the Pirate's Code.

The sequel was directed by Harold Cronk, co-written by him and Eric Machiela, and features the cast members reprising their roles. Christopher Lloyd's Grandpa Jack is also given a larger role compared to the first film, and the sequel features Frank Collison as its main antagonist, Admiral Ironsides.

The summary of the sequel's story, provided by executive producer Stephen Afendoulis, is the following:

Heroes Mickey and his best friend, Sully, are forced to take on a mission to save our country from the evil plans of Admiral Ironsides. The Admiral and his motley crew of modern day pirates have taken control of a large merchant ship with plans of deploying a new type of weapon that could destroy every electronic device on Earth. If Ironsides succeeds, it could be the end of the world as we know it.
