= Brad Stine =

American stand-up comedian, actor, and author

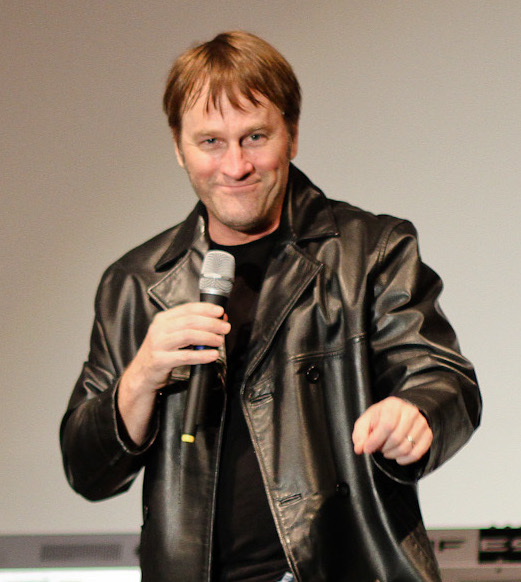
- Brad Stine in 2012
- Born: January 21, 1960 (age 66); Bremen, Indiana, U.S.
- Notable work: Put a Helmet On! (2003) and Wussification (2007)

Comedy career
- Years active: 1980s–present
- Medium: Stand-up, observational comedy, Christian comedy
- Genres: Observational comedy, Christian comedy
- Subjects: Everyday life, politics, Christianity, situational, conservatism
- Website: BradStine.com

Brad Stine (born January 21, 1960) is an American comedian and author.

== Biography ==
=== Early life ===
Stine was born and raised in Bremen, Indiana by Jerry and Nancy Stine. His father was an auto-body repairman and front man for a local musical combo called the Regents, and his mother was a housewife who was a devout Christian. He is the second of four children. He decided to become a comedian in kindergarten when he and a classmate put on a puppet show.

Stine's parents divorced when he was eight, but they later remarried and moved to California, only to divorce again. He stayed with his father, who briefly left the auto-body business to travel with his brother to carnivals in the Midwest. His father later remarried and returned to his previous work.

=== Career ===
Stine started practicing magic tricks at age 13, which later led to his performing magic in Southern California bars and restaurants. Stine also learned to perform sideshow stunts and began honing his comedy skills.

In the late 1980s, Stine was hired by a manager and toured colleges across the country with comedians Craig Anton and Emery Emery. His first television appearance was on Showtime’s Comedy Club Network.

Stine continued to work in comedy clubs and on TV, and eventually dropped his magic tricks and stunts. He started taking acting lessons and auditioned for movies and television shows.

=== Personal life ===
He resides in Brentwood, Tennessee, with his wife Desiree, and their two children. In his 2003 debut album, Put a Helmet On! he identified as a conservative Christian.

== Comedic style ==
Stine's style has been described by Newsweek as "conservative " with a "rat-a-tat delivery" and by The New Yorker as "frantic," "conservative," and "ADHD," with echoes of Robin Williams, Sam Kinison, Bill Hicks and George Carlin. He has been described as "a clean Denis Leary" and his material targets "liberals, humanists, political correctness and judgmental Christians."

Stine has claimed that his conservatism has sometimes resulted in the loss of appearances. Stine himself admits that much of his more extreme material is facetious and satirical, using ridiculous scenarios to make a finer point.

== Major appearances ==
Stine has appeared on several stand-up comedy shows, such as A&E’s Evening at the Improv and MTV's Half Hour Comedy Hour, and has appeared on news programs such as Fox News' Hannity & Colmes, CNN's Paula Zahn NOW and Glenn Beck, and the NBC Nightly News. Stine has also been interviewed on National Public Radio and has been featured on FOXNews.com and in Newsweek, the New Yorker, USA Today, and several other newspapers nationwide.

He was a featured performer for Promise Keepers Evangelical Christan organization in 2003, 2004, 2005, 2007 and once again in 2012 and also in 2014 . Also in 2004, he performed for "R: the Party," a party hosted by Jenna and Barbara Bush during the conservative Republican National Convention in New York City. Stine has also appeared with Go Fish for the song Christmas with a Capital "C", which disparages the term "happy holidays" and supports the use of the term "Merry Christmas."

== GodMen ==
Inspired by author David Murrow, Stine founded GodMen, a proposed alternative to Promise Keepers that emphasizes "spiritual conservatism". GodMen's inaugural event was held on October 28, 2006, in Nashville, Tennessee, and drew 200 men. Their second event was held on March 10, 2007, in rented space at a Franklin, Tennessee, mall and drew about 300 men. Many more events were scheduled for 2007 and 2008. As of spring 2012, Stine has returned to Promise Keepers.

== Acting work ==
Stine has appeared in minor roles in the films Welcome to Paradise, Sarah's Choice, Homeless for the Holidays, Christmas with a Capital C and Persecuted.

== Multimedia ==
In September 2008, he was featured in the multi-comedian DVD The Apostles of Comedy, which also features comedian/actors Ron Pearson, Jeff Allen and Anthony Griffith. The four comedians have been touring the country as The Apostles of Comedy since 2008 and are scheduled through May 2009.

=== Books ===
- Stine, Brad (October 2004). Being a Christian Without Being an Idiot: 10 Assumed Truths That Make Us Look Stupid. Word Distribution. ISBN 5-556-25453-2.
- Stine, Brad (March 23, 2006). Live from Middle America: Rants from a Red-State Comedian. Avery. ISBN 1-59463-015-1.
- Stine, Brad (January 29, 2008). How to Think Right: Rants from a Christian Conservative Comedian. Plume. ISBN 0-452-28808-8.
- Stine, Brad (July 28, 2023). Being a Christian Without Being an Idiot!: 11 Assumed Truths That Make Us Look Stupid. ISBN 1-642-93525-5.

=== Videos/recordings ===
- Brad Stine - "Rebel Without a Curse" (Nationwide church tour exclusive) (VHS). 2000.
- Brad Stine, Buddy Davis (2001). The Creation Adventure Team (DVD, VHS). Answers in Genesis Ministries, Inc. and Gospel Communications International, Inc.
- Brad Stine – "Put A Helmet On!" (DVD, VHS, Audio CD). Word Distribution. 2003.
- Brad Stine – "Brad Stine – Conservative Unleashed" (2004) (DVD, Audio CD). Word Entertainment. September 2004.
- Brad Stine – "Tolerate This!" (DVD, Audio CD). Warner Bros. August 2005.
- Brad Stine – "Wussification" (DVD, Audio CD). Word Entertainment. September 2007.
- Brad Stine – "The Best Of Brad Stine" (2 DVD Set) (DVD). Word Entertainment. May 2008.
- Brad Stine – "God's Comic" (DVD). The Adams Group. August 2012.
- Brad Stine – "Unapologetical" (DVD). Jax. September 1, 2020.
