= Mark A. Gabriel =

Egyptian writer

Mark A. Gabriel (born December 30, 1957) is an Egyptian-American lecturer and writer on Islam who lives in the United States. He is the author of five books critical of Salafi Islam, including Islam and Terrorism, Islam and the Jews, and Journey into the Mind of an Islamic Terrorist.

== Biography ==
In his first book written in 1997, Against the Tides in the Middle East: The true story of Mustafa, former teacher of Islamic history Gabriel tells of his birth on 30 December 1957 to Muslim parents in Upper Egypt. He explains that his birth name was Mustafa. His parents, wealthy owners of a clothing factory, as well as his six brothers and one sister, were all devout Muslims. He describes himself as a Muslim by birth who taught as professor of Islamic history at Cairo's Al-Azhar University in Cairo, Egypt before converting to evangelical Christianity at the age of 34. In a long interview in Tulsa World, Gabriel claims to have fled Egypt after his own father threatened to have him killed for converting to Christianity, and to have lived in South Africa before moving to the United States in 1999.

Mustafa subsequently changed his name, taking the Christian name of Mark Gabriel. He claims to be unable to use his birth name because of fear of assassination by Islamic extremists.

Baylor University professor Thomas S. Kidd, situates Gabriel in the context of a series of converts from Islam to Christianity whose books and speeches have attracted attention among "conservative American Protestants." These include Ergun and Emir Safa, authors of Unveiling Islam: An Insider's Look at Muslim Life and Beliefs; Pastor Reza Safa, an Iranian-born former Shi'a Muslim and author of Inside Islam; Exposing and Reaching the World of Islam; and Abdul Saleeb (a pen name,) a former Sufi Muslim and author of the Dark Side of Islam (co-authored with R. C. Sproul). After summarizing the details of Gabriel's life story, Kidd mentions that "there have been questions raised about his real identity."

In December 2016 Mark A. Gabriel was awarded a PhD in Public Law by the University of Cape Town for his dissertation Reforming Hudud Ordinance to Reconcile Islamic Criminal Law with International Human Rights Law.

== Impact ==
Reviewing Gabriel's book Jesus and Muhammad: Profound Differences and Surprising Similarities, for Foreign Affairs, Walter Russell Mead described it as one of a number of books that were "doing far more to frame the future of U.S. policy toward the Middle East than most books published by scholars with more conventional credentials and views", since "It is from books like this one that many millions of Americans form their impressions of Islam as the war on terror grinds on".

In Fundamentalism in the Modern World, Oddbjorn Leivik asserts that Gabriel's books Islam and Terrorism," and "Islam and the Jews, were the main source of Pastor John Hagee's "attack on Islam", the former book also being distributed free to members of the Norwegian Parliament. According to Leivik, Hagee's 2006 book Jerusalem Countdown, like the two Gabriel books from which he asserts that it is largely drawn, "combines apocalyptic visions of Israel being threatened by its enemies, with the 'unveiling' of Islam as an inherently violent religion." ' Like the Gabriel books Islam and Terrorism," and "Islam and the Jews, Hagee's Jerusalem Countdown, was published by Charisma House publishers. Gabriel has been described as part of the counter-jihad movement.

Gabriel's website contains a declaration distancing his writings from their use and abuse by "right wing organisations and individuals...Many of these misguided people use my writings to wrongly justify hate against Muslims."

== Works ==
=== Nonfiction ===
- Against the Tides in the Middle East, International Academic Centre for Muslim Evangelism in South Africa, 1997 (published under the name "Mustafa"). ISBN 1875095276
- Islam and Terrorism: What the Qur'an really teaches about Christianity, violence and the goals of the Islamic jihad. 2002, ISBN 0-88419-884-7 Charisma House.
- Islam and the Jews: The Unfinished Battle. 2003, ISBN 0-88419-956-8 Charisma House. Publication of a Norwegian edition was sponsored by the missionary organization, Youth with a Mission." Historian Richard Landes describes Islam and the Jews as a "confessional discussion of Muslim attitudes towards Jews and Israel". In Islam and the Jews, Gabriel argues that only a minority of American Muslims favor political violence, and that most Muslims are "ordinary Muslims," who follow Islam because it is their culture and tradition, but who do not practice the faith as described in the Quran. He contrasts this large group with the smaller number of "fanatical" and "violent" Muslims who may support or participate in acts of terrorism.
- Jesus and Muhammad: Profound Differences and Surprising Similarities. 2004, Charisma House. ISBN 1-59185-291-9 Jesus and Muhammad was banned by the government of Malaysia on the grounds that it contains twisted facts that might undermine the faith of Muslims.
- Journey Inside The Mind Of an Islamic Terrorist: Why They Hate Us and How We Can Change Their Minds. 2006, Charisma House. ISBN 1-59185-713-9
- Culture Clash: Islam's War on America. 2007, Charisma House. ISBN 978-1-59979-212-5

=== Fiction ===
- Coffee with the Prophet: 21st Century Conversations with Muhammad. 2008, ISBN 978-0-61520-728-5

== See also ==
- Criticism of Islam
- Christoph Luxenberg
- Ibn Warraq
