= Stickfighter =

1997 film directed by BJ Davis

- Film poster
- Directed by: BJ Davis
- Screenplay by: Kely McClung; Rob Neighbors
- Story by: Kely McClung
- Produced by: BJ Davis; Julia Davis; Cary Glieberman
- Starring: Kely McClung; Alex Meneses (as Paula Vargas)
- Cinematography: Michael Shea
- Edited by: Michael de Avila; Shannon Goldman
- Music by: James Tunnell
- Release dates: 1994; 1997 (USA)
- Running time: 89 minutes
- Country: USA
- Language: English

Stickfighter is a 1994 American action B movie directed by BJ Davis and starring Kely McClung who also wrote the story. It was released in the US in 1997.

== Plot ==
Kely McClung stars as John Lambert, a D.E.A. agent whose partner loses his life in a sting operation gone wrong. Lambert quits the force to cope with this loss.

== Cast ==
- Kely McClung as John Lambert
- Alex Meneses (as Paula Vargas) as Luella Cartegenas
- Karl Johnson as Dirk Riley
- Jeff Celentano (as Jeff Weston) as James Tucker
- Robert Pralgo as Robert Reves
- Scott Sullivan as Arvo Riley
- Roger Callard as Lt. Davis
- Darcy DeMoss (as Darcey DeMoss) as Michelle Madsen
