= Click Click Snap =

2007 book by Sean McGowan

- Click Click Snap by Sean McGowan cover
- Author: Sean McGowan
- Cover artist: Sean McGowan
- Language: English
- Genre: Literary Nonfiction
- Publisher: Sean McGowan
- Publication date: October 08, 2007
- Publication place: United States
- Media type: Print (Paperback) & Digital (PDF)
- Pages: 156 pp
- ISBN: 978-0-615-15542-5
- OCLC: 176927703

Click Click Snap is a 2007 book by Sean McGowan. It is a work of literary nonfiction and a photographic novel (but not a photo novel).

The book has been released into the public domain. The full book can be read for free (see source).

== Synopsis ==
Click Click Snap is written in first person prose. In the book, Sean McGowan travels through Athens, Ephesus, Bent Jbail, Beirut, Damascus, The West Bank, Petra, and Cairo; completing the eight chapters of the book, respectively. Its diverse (and, arguably, scattered) topics mainly include the neuroscience of art, war, belief, racism.

Unusually, each chapter is written as a self-sustaining joke, where more serious topics seemingly arise incidentally. Specific incidents include urinating on the Temple of Artemis to illustrate the benefits of biological satisfaction and stealing a federal election ballot at gunpoint during the 2007 elections in Syria to show "...even though there is such a thing as a ballot with only one name on it, there is no such thing as a clear choice."
