= Alex Meneses =

American actress and model (born 1965)

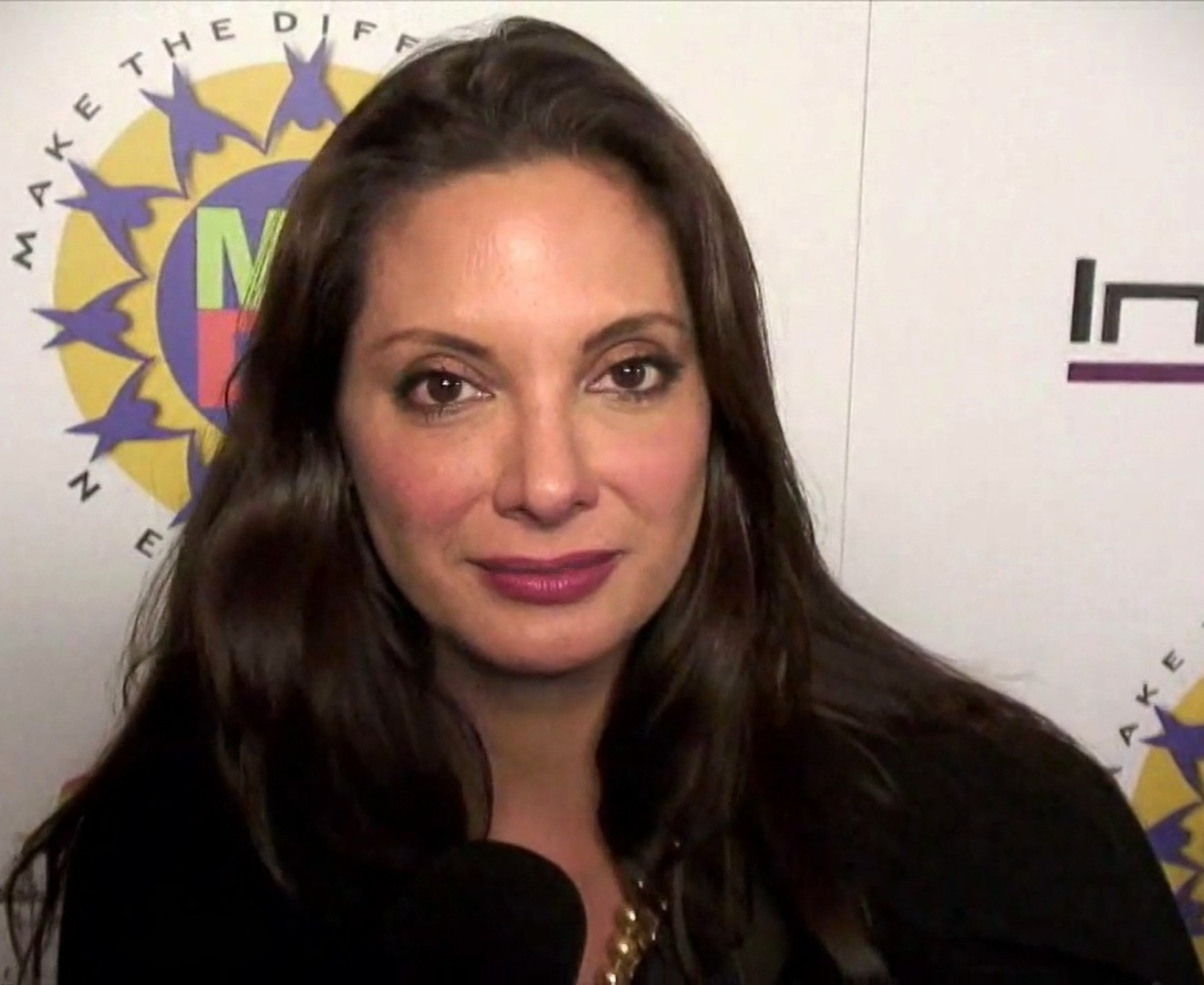
- Meneses in 2008
- Born: February 11, 1965 (age 60); Chicago, Illinois, U.S.
- Occupations: Actress, model
- Years active: 1994–present

Alex Meneses (born February 11, 1965) is an American actress and model.

== Early life ==
Meneses was born in Chicago, Illinois. She is of Mexican descent on her father's side and Ukrainian descent on her mother's side. Meneses studied acting at Chicago's The Second City Improvisational Theater during summer vacations. Immediately upon graduation from high school, she received a modeling contract in Milan, Italy. Originally, her stay in Italy was only to be three months, but she fell in love with the country, and remained there for two years, becoming a successful model. When Meneses returned to the United States, she moved to Los Angeles, where she studied acting at the Lee Strasberg Institute.

== Career ==
Meneses was a regular cast member in the Showtime comedy series Sherman Oaks in 1995. She later had the recurring role as Teresa Morales in the final season of the CBS western drama series Dr. Quinn, Medicine Woman, replacing actress Michelle Bonilla from the previous season. She also had supporting roles in a number of films, including Selena, The Flintstones in Viva Rock Vegas and Auto Focus.

She had other roles on television, appearing in an episode of Friends as Cookie (Joey Tribbiani's sister), as well as episodes of Suddenly Susan, The Hughleys, Any Day Now, CSI: Crime Scene Investigation, NCIS, Psych, and The Goldbergs. Meneses has also appeared in numerous Los Angeles stage productions. She had a recurring role in the CBS comedy series, Everybody Loves Raymond as Robert Barone's Italian girlfriend, Stefania. In 2015, Meneses was cast as aging telenovela star Isabela Santamaria in the NBC comedy series, Telenovela. On February 19, 2021, Meneses was cast in a recurring role for The CW series Walker.

== Filmography ==
=== Film ===
Year	Title	Role	Notes
1994	Stickfighter	Luella Cartegenas	
1995	The Immortals	Cleopatra	
1997	Living in Peril	Catherine Langtry	
1997	Selena	Sara	
1999	Stealth Fighter	Roberto's Young Lady Desidea	
2000	The Flintstones in Viva Rock Vegas	Roxie	
2001	Love	Maria	
2002	The Round and Round	Becky Lord	
2002	Auto Focus	Emily	
2006	Funny Money	Gina	
2009	Fire from Below	Reign Palmer	
2009	Wrong Turn at Tahoe	Marisa	
2010	Boyle Heights	Tinos Wife	
2017	Ripped	Debbie	
2019	The Wall of Mexico	Monica Arista	

=== Television ===
Year	Title	Role	Notes
1994	Hot Line	Helen	Episode: "Payback"
1995	Kissing Miranda	Miranda Castillo	Television film
1995	Amanda and the Alien	Connie Flores	Television film
1995	Sherman Oaks	Elena	13 episodes
1996	The John Larroquette Show	Venus	Episode: "Ring of Fire"
1997	Friends	Cookie	Episode: "The One Where Chandler Can't Remember Which Sister"
1997	Head over Heels	Erika	Episode: "One Down"
1997–1998	Dr. Quinn, Medicine Woman	Teresa Morales	11 episodes
1998	Maximum Bob	Rosita Lopez	Episode: "Once Bitten..."
1998	Martial Law	Anette Delgado	Episode: "Lock-Up"
1999	Suddenly Susan	Susie	Episode: "Wedding Bell Blues"
1999	Silk Stalkings	Yolanda Romero	Episode: "Dance Fever"
1999	Pensacola: Wings of Gold	Elena Perez	Episode: "Cuba Libre"
1999	Early Edition	Lupeta	Episode: "Take Me Out to the Ballgame"
1999	Family Law	Nanny Sanchez	Episode: "The Nanny"
2000	Cover Me	Gabrielle Vega	Episode: "Beauty Marks"
2000	Any Day Now	Yolanda Marmol	Episode: "The Outsiders"
2000	The Princess & the Barrio Boy	Coach Sonia	Television film
2000–2005	Everybody Loves Raymond	Stefánia Fogagnolo	6 episodes
2001	Bob Patterson	Water Girl (Maria)	Episode: "Pilot"
2001	The Hughleys	Coral Mills	4 episodes
2002	The Brothers García	Laura Cruz	Episode: "Don't Judge a Book by Its Cover"
2002	Boomtown	Vicki Pineda	Episode: "Crash"
2003	44 Minutes: The North Hollywood Shoot-Out	Nicole	Television film
2003–2004	10-8: Officers on Duty	Anna Valero	5 episodes
2004	NCIS	Vanessa	Episode: "Missing"
2004	This Just In!	Sami Ruiz	2 episodes
2006	Mind of Mencia	Mary / Dr. Milfy	2 episodes
2006	CSI: Miami	Ana	Episode: "Rio"
2007	Prison Break	Chi Chi, Mexican Prostitute	Episode: "Panama"
2008	Psych	Quintessa Gabriel	Episode: "Lights, Camera... Homicidio"
2008	CSI: Crime Scene Investigation	Emilina Carlos	Episode: "Let It Bleed"
2008	Xenophobia	Jessica	Television film
2009	Ruby & the Rockits	Ms. Vanessa Vasquez	Episode: "Hot for Spanish Teacher"
2009	This Might Hurt	Sofia Venezuela	Television film
2009, 2012	The Cleveland Show	Svetlana / Fabrizia / Waitress	2 episodes
2010	Gigantic	Nyri Khandan	2 episodes
2013	The Goldbergs	Sophia	Episode: "Why're You Hitting Yourself?"
2014	Growing Up Fisher	Allison	Episode: "Pilot"
2015	Austin & Ally	Señora Gomez	Episode: "Seniors and Señors"
2015–2016	Telenovela	Isabela Santamaria	11 episodes
2017	Jane the Virgin	Katherine	3 episodes
2018	Unorganized Crime	Rosie Corso	Television film
2019	Why Women Kill	Maureen Bennett	Episode: "Marriages Don't Break Up on Account of Murder - It's Just a Symptom That Something Else Is Wrong"
2021	Walker	Dr. Adriana Ramirez	3 episodes
