= The Feeding (film) =

- DVD cover
- Directed by: Paul Moore
- Written by: Paul Moore
- Produced by: James G.H. Knight; Heather Tanner; Scot Tanner
- Starring: Robert Pralgo; Kara Maria Amedon; Ben Green; Courtney Hogan
- Cinematography: Todd Gilpin
- Edited by: Todd Gilpin
- Music by: Todd Allen
- Distributed by: Stormcatcher Films; Lions Gate Films
- Release date: September 5, 2006
- Running time: 90 minutes
- Country: United States
- Language: English

The Feeding is a 2006 film written and directed by Paul Moore.

== Plot summary ==
A werewolf pursues campers in the Appalachian Mountains. Consumed by its legendary bloodlust, the creature begins the hunt for its oldest and most dangerous prey: Man. Special Agent Jack Driscoll has seen this before. The beast is his obsession and his nightmare. Now, he and his new partner must race against the rising moon to save a group of unsuspecting campers. Outmatched and unarmed, the frightened group must rally themselves to survive the night. As their numbers dwindle and their strength wanes, the group scrambles to answer the only question that will save their lives; how do you kill the unkillable?

== Cast ==
- Dione J Updike as Aimee
- Kara Maria Amedon as Cynthia
- Robert Pralgo as Jack Driscoll
- Sam Blankenship as Ranger#2
- Barry Ellenberger as Ranger#1 / Werewolf
- Ben Green as Phil
- Lucas N. Hall as Hunter #1
- Courtney Hogan as Reagan
- Lynnili James as Elle
- Jennifer Leigh as Elizabeth
- Andrew Porter as Allen
- Ben Reed as Clive Burnell
- Rod Shephard as Ty
- Hektor Stockton as dying werewolf
- David Winning as Hunter #2
