= Faith of Our Fathers (film) =

- Theatrical release poster
- Directed by: Carey Scott
- Written by: Kevin Downes; Carey Scott; Harold Uhl; David A. R. White
- Produced by: Shelene Bryan; Bobby Downes; Kevin Downes; Michael Scott; David A. R. White
- Starring: Stephen Baldwin; Kevin Downes; David A.R. White; Rebecca St. James; Si Robertson; Candace Cameron Bure
- Cinematography: Randall Gregg
- Edited by: Matt Cassell; David de Vos; Alex Kendrick
- Music by: Marc Fantini; Steffan Fantini
- Production companies: Downes Brothers Entertainment; Pure Flix Entertainment
- Distributed by: Pure Flix Entertainment; Samuel Goldwyn Films
- Release date: July 1, 2015
- Running time: 96 minutes
- Country: United States
- Language: English
- Box office: $1 million

Faith of Our Fathers is a 2015 American Christian drama film directed by Carey Scott and written by Kevin Downes, Carey Scott, Harold Uhl and David A. R. White. The film stars Downes, White, Stephen Baldwin, Candace Cameron Bure, Rebecca St. James and Sean McGowan.

Initially titled To the Wall when shown to preview audiences in January 2015, this was changed prior to its national release on July 1, 2015 by Pure Flix Entertainment and Samuel Goldwyn Films.

== Plot ==
In 1997, meek California postal service worker John Paul George, named after three members of The Beatles and due to marry his fiancée Cynthia in three weeks, discovers a box of war belongings from his father Stephen, who died during the Vietnam War in 1969, in the garage of his recently deceased mother's house. Among its contents is a letter mentioning "Edward J. Adams", Stephen's best friend from Vietnam. Curious, John eventually encounters someone who seemingly recognizes the name. Arriving in Mississippi, he encounters Edward's son, Wayne Adams. An ill-tempered hermit, Wayne initially declines to speak to John, but at nightfall, he lets him inside for dinner, revealing that he wanted to know if John really cared.

Later that night, Wayne reveals to John that his father rediscovered his Christian faith through John's father and invites him to accompany him to the Vietnam Veterans Memorial in Washington, D.C. to see their fathers' names on The Wall and get closure. He forces him to pay to read Edward's many letters and promises him a letter from Edward which mentions Stephen if he comes. In flashbacks, Stephen's and Edward's squad leader in the 25th Infantry Division, Sergeant Mansfield, takes them and their fellow squadmates to rescue troops in a downed aircraft behind enemy lines; the two men bond, eventually becoming friends.

During their trip, the duo get into several misadventures, which include brawling with several hillbillies at a gas station. Also, Wayne picks up two seemingly friendly hitchhikers on the road, upsetting John. After discovering that the local motel's rooms are filled, the quartet camps out overnight. The next morning, John converses with one of the hitchhikers, a woman named Annie, who is travelling with her cousin and suggests that they all go out for coffee. However, John is unwilling to abandon a sleeping Wayne, though Annie assures him that they will return. After the hitchhikers ultimately steal Wayne's 1965 Ford Thunderbird, he awakens and chastises John. He decides to test-drive an antique 1984 Volkswagen Rabbit that they both eventually purchase for $1200, but a policeman eventually arrests them for speeding. John contacts Cynthia from the county jail and pleads for her to help bail them out, but she declines, appalled at his and Wayne's current predicament. Wayne reveals that 16 years earlier, he traveled with his mother Eleanor to Washington, D.C., but an intoxicated driver struck their car at an overpass bridge, causing it to flip over the overpass; he survived, although she was killed on impact.

The next morning, the men are released, as the Volkswagen is revealed as a stolen car meant to con innocent victims out of money. Cynthia contacts John to apologize for her actions the previous evening, but he disconnects the call after an armed Wayne enters a convenience store carrying a revolver. As Wayne threatens the elderly cashier, John intervenes and attempts to reason with him. However, a Virginia State Police trooper eventually enters, and Wayne's revolver is exposed as a plastic replica. After arresting them, the trooper reveals himself in his squad car as Mansfield. At his residence, he shares that following the death of his wife a decade earlier, he was profoundly influenced by Stephen's words about the Lord. Before the duo depart for the Memorial on a motorcycle with a sidecar that is in Mansfield's motorcycle collection, John probes him about how his father perished in Vietnam. In a flashback, as he and Stephen are both ambushed, Edward accepts the Lord as grenades destroy the downed aircraft in a massive explosion, killing both of them. John sobs after reading the letter addressed to him inside Stephen's Bible.

Continuing their trek to Washington, D.C., the duo stop at the overpass bridge where Eleanor was killed, encountering the smashed vehicle from the accident and excavating a letter from Edward from underneath a rock, in which Edward expresses that although he is unable to be physically present in Wayne's life, he still cares about him. While reading it aloud, Wayne is surprised and moved that his father actually started reading the Bible prior to his passing. The journey ends with the pair, having closely bonded with each other, locating their fathers' names at the Wall.

== Cast ==
- Kevin Downes as John Paul George
- David A.R. White as Wayne Adams
- Stephen Baldwin as Mansfield
- Candace Cameron Bure as Cynthia
- Rebecca St. James as Annie
- Sean McGowan as Stephen George
- Scott Whyte as Edward "Eddie" Adams
- Ryan Doom as Pvt. Shears

In addition, "Uncle Si" Robertson made a brief appearance as a gas station clerk.

== Reception ==
Audiences and critics panned Faith of Our Fathers. On review aggregator Rotten Tomatoes the film has a score of 9% based on 11 reviews with an average rating of 4/10. On Metacritic, which assigns a normalized rating, the film has a score of 20 out of 100, based on 5 critics, indicating "generally unfavorable" reviews.
