= Countdown: Jerusalem =

- Directed by: A.F. Silver
- Produced by: Rachel Goldenberg; David Michael Latt; Paul Bales
- Starring: Kim Little; Clint Browning; Russell Reynolds
- Edited by: Brian Brinkman; Bobby K. Richardson
- Music by: Joseph Trapanese
- Distributed by: The Asylum
- Release date: February 25, 2009
- Running time: 93 minutes
- Country: United States
- Language: English

Countdown: Jerusalem (a.k.a. Countdown: Armageddon) is a 2009 American science fiction thriller film direct-to-video film.

== Plot ==
The film talks about the Seven signs of the Apocalypse, in this case created by a sect, which aims to take the company to the brink of a world war.

Before the searches for her daughter as a series of catastrophic disasters push a destabilized society toward the brink of global war.

A mother and father search for their only child against the backdrop of the Tribulation.

== Cast ==
- Kim Little as Allison
- Clint Browning as Joseph
- Russell Reynolds as Itzhak
- Mark Hengst as Mark Thompson
- Audrey Latt as Mary
- April Wade as Cindy
- Spencer Scott as John Cosgrove
- Vivian Brunstein as Adi
- Danae Nason as Tina
- Matt Mercer as Lavi
- Cameron Cash as Abraham
- Dean Kreyling as Detective Strand
- Jose Prendes as Agent Malcolm Grant
- Matthew Farhat as Gianni
- Alexander Hatzidiakos as Romano
- Meredith Thomas as Newscaster

== See also ==
- Jerusalem Countdown
- Book of Revelation
- Seven seals
