= Jerusalem Countdown (film) =

- Directed by: Harold Cronk
- Screenplay by: Harold Cronk; Matthew Tailford
- Story by: David Harris; David Michael Phelps; David A. R. White
- Based on: Jerusalem Countdown by John Hagee
- Produced by: James Chankin; Michael Scott; Matthew Tailford; David A.R. White
- Starring: David A. R. White; Anna Zielinski; Lee Majors; Jaci Velasquez; Stacy Keach; Randy Travis
- Cinematography: Todd Barron
- Edited by: Vance Null
- Music by: Jeehun Hwang
- Production companies: 10 West Studios; God & Country Entertainment; Pure Flix Productions
- Distributed by: Pure Flix Entertainment
- Release date: August 26, 2011
- Running time: 85 minutes
- Country: United States
- Language: English

Jerusalem Countdown is a 2011 Christian thriller film adapted from the speculative fiction novel of the same name by John Hagee. It was directed and co-written by Harold Cronk and stars David A.R. White, Anna Zielinski, Randy Travis, Lee Majors, Stacy Keach, and Marco Khan.

== Plot ==
As negotiations take place in the United States regarding Israel, senior FBI agent Shane Daughtry (David A. R. White) is contacted by Arlin Rockwell (Lee Majors), an arms dealer. Rockwell informs Daughtry of his role in an operation known as "Seven Wonders". Before he can reveal what it is, Rockwell is abruptly murdered by Nick Tanner (Matthew Tailford), a terrorist assassin. Daughtry pursues and manages to apprehend Tanner.

Meanwhile, agent Eve Rearden (Anna Zielinski) meets with her father Jackson (Stacy Keach), who tries to warn her of the negotiations inevitable disastrous results. She ignores him and leaves.

Rearden later meets with Daughtry, who she had a falling out with after an operation gone wrong. After some investigating, they discover that the "Sevens Wonders" are actually nuclear warheads that have been smuggled into the country. They learn that the bombs are intended to cripple the United States and leave Israel vulnerable to attack.

After interrogating Tanner, Daughtry learns that an organization known as the "Revolution of God" is behind the conspiracy. They take this information to Jack (Randy Travis), a CIA officer. Jack informs them that the "Revolution of God" is an alleged group of world leaders who plan to dominate the world. They also learn that Matthew Dean (Nick Jameson), a former CIA agent, is also working for the organization. Jack refuses to tell them anything else, leaving Daughtry suspicious.

After interrogating Tanner again, they learn that the organization intends to assassinate the visiting Israeli Prime Minister. Rearden leaves to protect the Prime Minister, while Daughtry goes to Chicago, where he has learned the bombs are being kept.

Dean infiltrates the airport the Prime Minister is leaving from, and plants a bomb on the plane. Rearden spots Dean, however, after a shootout, the bomb is detonated, killing the Prime Minister.

Upon arriving in Chicago, Daughtry is informed that the nukes are being kept in a suburban neighborhood. Daniel, a local resident who had grown suspicious of the homes' occupants, helps Daughtry defeat the terrorists and stop the bombs from being detonated.

Dean contacts his superior, who berates him for the failed operation. He is then killed by Tanner, who had earlier escaped FBI custody. Tanner takes Dean's phone and speaks to the leader, who is revealed to be Jack. Jack then tells him to await further orders, and Tanner sets off a bomb which destroys Dean's vehicle.

Back in Chicago, Daughtry contacts Rearden, and hopes to find Dean. Suddenly, however, an earthquake occurs, and the sky turns red. Then, the Rapture occurs, taking all Christians, including Jackson and Daniel, off the earth. Rearden laments not listening to her father, and fears for the future. Daughtry then departs to save Rearden as the city quickly descends into chaos.

== Cast ==
- David A. R. White as Shane Daughtry, an FBI agent trying to find the nukes.
- Anna Zielinski as Eve Rearden, an FBI counter Intel investigator who bears a strong hatred for Shane.
- Randy Travis as Jack Thompson, a CIA director and a secret Revolution of God leader.
- Lee Majors as Arlin Rockwell, an arms dealer who smuggled in the bombs.
- Jaci Velasquez as Angie, the wife of Daniel, a news researcher.
- Matthew Tailford as Nick Tanner, a terrorist assassin.
- Nick Jameson as Matthew Dean, a terrorist commander and former CIA agent.
- Marco Khan as Javad, a terrorist overseeing the transportation of the nukes. Like Jackson his name is only mentioned on the cast section of the credits.
- John Gilbert as Malikov, a Russian contact.
- Stacy Keach as Jackson, a high-ranking government official and the father of Eve. Like Javad his name is also not said or mentioned except for the opening and closing credits.
- Jamie Nieto as Russ Walters
- Michelle Peltz as Daughtry
- Johnny Russell as Sgt. Amara
- Cole Schaefer as FBI Agent Brian Fisher
- Geneva Somers as Sheila Tanner

== Soundtrack ==
The soundtrack was written by Jeehun Hwang.

Songs in Jerusalem Countdown
No.	Title	Writer(s)	Performer(s)	Length
1.	"Find My Way"	Eric Schmidt, Michael Sylvester, David Johnson and Matthew Johnson	Eric Schmidt, Michael Sylvester, David Johnson and Matthew Johnson
2.	"Hope in You"	Erin Katlin and Brendan Andersen	Erin Katlin

== Reception ==
Several reviewers complained about character development that leads nowhere and excessive attention lavished on newscasts pertaining to negotiations in Israel, the importance of these issues characters might be revisited in a sequel. Victor Medina's review for Cinelix mentions an additional nine cut scenes from the Blu-ray, that would have provided more character development, but would have also slowed down the action. For this type of film, Jerusalem Countdown includes better than average performances, a fair degree of filmmaking craft, but some rote and cliché ridden writing.
