= Jerusalem Countdown =

2006 book by John Hagee

Jerusalem Countdown: A Warning to the World
- Author: John Hagee
- Language: English
- Publisher: Frontline
- Publication date: 2006
- ISBN: 9781591858935

Jerusalem Countdown: A Warning to the World is a book written in 2006 by American pastor John Hagee which interprets the Bible to claim that Russia and several Islamic nations will invade Israel and will be destroyed by God. This will cause the Antichrist, the head of the European Union, to create a confrontation over Israel between China and the West. A final battle between East and West at Armageddon will then precipitate the Second Coming of Christ. The book was published by Charisma House.

Hagee asserts that "the reason for the continual conflict over the city of Jerusalem is theology" because the Qur'an instructed believers "to kill and maim anyone who did not believe in Allah or in Muhammad his prophet."

He also claims that when Jeremiah prophesied in the Bible that "I will send for many hunters, and they will hunt them down on every mountain and hill and from the crevices of the rocks," he was foreseeing The Holocaust. "The hunter is one who pursues his target with force and fear," Hagee writes. "No one could see the horror of the Holocaust coming, but the force and fear of Hitler's Nazis drove the Jewish people back to the only home that God ever intended for the Jews to have—Israel." He has made the same claim in a sermon.

According to Oddbjorn Leirvik, Hagee drew the material for Countdown largely from Mark A. Gabriel's books Islam and Terrorism, and Islam and the Jews. Leirvik describes Jerusalem Countdown as combining "apocalyptic visions of Israel being threatened by its enemies, with the 'unveiling' of Islam as an inherently violent religion."

== Film ==
After the TV movie Countdown: Jerusalem (2009), another apocalyptic thriller film with the name Jerusalem Countdown, "based on the book by John Hagee," was released in theaters by Pure Flix Entertainment on August 26, 2011. It stars David A.R. White, Anna Zielinski, Lee Majors, Jaci Velasquez, Stacy Keach, and Randy Travis.

== See also ==
- List of dates predicted for apocalyptic events
