= The Prodigal Trilogy =

- Directed by: Tad Munnings
- Produced by: Jason Hildebrand
- Starring: Jason Hildebrand
- Music by: Mike Janzen
- Release date: 2008
- Running time: 24 minutes
- Country: Canada
- Language: English
- Budget: $65,000

The Prodigal Trilogy is a 2008 independent Christian short film that tells the Parable of the Prodigal Son from the Bible, from a modern perspective. It was made in a combination of theatrical and cinematic styles, and was filmed in the Orillia Opera House in Orillia, Ontario, Canada.

== Plot ==
The film is divided into three acts, each act containing the three characters' monologues. Each character is played by Jason Hildebrand.

=== Act I ===
Act I is the younger son's story. He tells of how he demanded that his father should give him his inheritance right away, and how he then ran away and spent himself on every pleasure he could think of. When his money was spent and his pleasure all gone, he tells of how he went back home to his father, and how his father accepted him back into the family.

=== Act II ===
The second act contains the story of the older brother, who tells of his own righteousness and his disgust at what his younger brother did. When his brother returned home, he watched in horror at how his father welcomed back his son, going so far as to even throw a party for him, even though he had never given his elder (and more upright in standing) son a party.

=== Act III ===
Act III gives us the father's perspective on the whole situation. He speaks of how, deeply saddened by his younger son's actions, he did the only thing a parent could do in a situation like this – he prayed, and continued loving. When his son finally came home, he joyfully accepted him back into the family with his complete heart. The only thing that saddens him still is that his older son, though doing all the right things outwardly, is more lost than the younger son ever was, because of his heart-attitude.

== Production style ==
The production style of the film was as much a part of the story as the characters were. Key elements of the story were further communicated through the use of a few simple props, which each served their purposes during each act. For instance, an ornate scarlet cloth was used both as a robe and a tablecloth at different times throughout the three acts.

Each act made use of a different cinematographic style, as well. Act I was shot in a hand-held style, Act II had smooth dolly and tripod styles, and Act III combined both styles in a smooth Steadicam style. This was done in order to convey the personalities of the characters of the Younger Son, Elder Son, and Father, respectively.

== Awards ==
The Prodigal Trilogy has won several awards and honors, including:

- Special Jury Award: Most Original Short - 2008 Faith and Film Festival
- Best of Show - 2009 Imago Film Festival
- Best Dramatic Short - 2009 San Antonio Independent Christian Film Festival
- Honorable Mention - The Accolade Competition
- Official Selection - Gold Lion Film Festival
