= Conclave (disambiguation) =

A conclave is a meeting of the College of Cardinals to elect the Pope of the Roman Catholic Church.

Conclave may also refer to:

- ConClave (convention), an annual science fiction convention in Michigan, US
- Conclave (novel), a 2016 novel by Robert Harris
  - Conclave (film), a 2024 film based on the novel
- Conclave, a 2001 novel by Roberto Pazzi
- The Conclave, a 2006 Canadian/German film
- Section conclave, an annual event for groups of local Order of the Arrow lodges
