= Livin' It LA =

Livin' It LA is a skateboarding video, directed by Stephen Baldwin. This latest installment of Livin' It features 16 skaters including Lance Mountain, Ray Barbee, Jay Haizlip, and Christian Hosoi in his first film appearance since being released from prison. The DVD will also feature Reliance Pro Brian Sumner, Chocolate Pro Richard Mulder, Zoo York Pro Donny Barley, Reliance Pros Josh Kasper, Tim Byrne, Elijah Moore, and many others.
