= Bobby Downes (film producer) =

American film producer

- Born: October 17, 1967 (age 58); Visalia, California
- Occupation: CEO of ChristianCinema.com
- Years active: 1999–present
- Spouse: Layne Downes (m. 1993)
- Children: 2

Bobby Downes (born October 17, 1967) is an American film producer and the older brother of Kevin Downes.

== Biography ==
One of America's leading executives in the area of faith and family entertainment, Downes grew up in Visalia, about 200 mi (320 km) north of Los Angeles, where most of the early Christian films he produced were shot. He currently lives in San Antonio, Texas with his wife Layne and their son Brennen and daughter Bo.

== Professional life ==
Downes holds both Bachelor of Science and Master of Science degrees from California Polytechnic State University. In the early 1990s, after a three-year teaching stint in public education, Bobby spent much of the 90's leading teams of missionaries into more than 20 countries as an ambassador.

In 1999, Bobby founded ChristianCinema.com, now the largest selection of faith-affirming and family-approved movies on the Internet. The company is the largest independent retailer of faith-based movies in the U.S. The company specializes in title curation and consumer marketing of faith-based movies and is respected in the industry as one of the leading key indicators for faith-based movies. He led the company into one of 2010’s 'Inc. 5000' leading companies in America. Today, the company is the leading Transactional Video on Demand platform for Christian & Family Movies with thousands of movies streamed over platforms like iOS, Apple TV, Roku, and Android.

During the last two decades, Bobby has been involved in every aspect from script development, financing, production, marketing and distribution worldwide in all formats.

Bobby has produced more than a dozen feature films for the faith market. Beginning in 1999, Bobby produced his first independent feature film The Moment After and its sequel The Moment After 2: The Awakening, both of which were acquired by Sony Pictures. Bobby produced Mercy Streets starring Eric Roberts and again worked with Roberts in Six: The Mark Unleashed', starring Stephen Baldwin and Jeffrey Dean Morgan. Both films acquired for distribution by Sony Pictures. He executive produced for producer Ralph Winter (X-Men, Fantastic 4) on Frank Peretti's best-selling novel film version distributed by 20th Century Fox, producing The Lost Medallion with Bill Muir, The Redemption of Henry Myers and Hoovey, the true life story of Eric Elliott.

Downes' most notable film was based on the novel by New York Times best-selling author Karen Kingsbury: Like Dandelion Dust starring Academy-Award® winner Mira Sorvino and Emmy Award Winner Barry Pepper was released by Twentieth Century Fox after winning more than 30 international film festival awards for Best Picture and premiered in Deauville, France at the Deauville American Film Festival in 2009.

From January 2006 through the end of 2008, Bobby helped finance, develop the branding, collaborated on the writing and was core to bringing the #1 New York Times' best-selling novel The Shack to publication through its first million books sold. He was then instrumental in structuring a deal with Hachette Book Group, the world's second largest publisher. The book has sold more than 20 million copies worldwide and remained number one on the New York Times Bestseller list for more than 50 weeks.

== Filmography ==
=== Producer/Executive Producer ===
- The Moment After (1999)
- Mercy Streets (2000)
- Lay It Down (2001)
- Time Changer (2002)
- Six: The Mark Unleashed (2004)
- The Visitation (2006)
- The Moment After 2 (2006)
- Like Dandelion Dust (2009)
- The Lost Medallion (2009)
- Heaven's Rain (2010)
- The Redemption of Henry Myers (2013)
- Hoovey (2013)
- Faith of our Fathers (2015)
- The National Bible Bee Game Show (Season 2) (2017)
