= Lay It Down (film) =

2001 film by Michael Cargile

- Directed by: Michael Cargile
- Written by: Michael Cargile
- Produced by: Bobby Downes; Kevin Downes; Shawn Hendrix; D. Gunther Tarampi
- Starring: Sean McEwen; Nathan Bell; Jacob Head; Francesca Caro
- Cinematography: Philip Hurn
- Edited by: Jeffrey Lee Hollis
- Music by: Tom Gire; John Sponsler
- Production company: ChristianCinema.com
- Distributed by: Cornerstone Television
- Release date: April 3, 2001
- Running time: 50 minutes
- Country: United States
- Language: English

Lay It Down is a 2001 Christian action film directed by Michael Cargile. It was released on April 3, 2001.

== Plot ==
The two Destin brothers are about to collide with eternity. When older Ben (Sean McEwen) chooses the narrow road, he forces his younger brother Pete, and the people around him, into a head-on encounter with life and death.

== Cast ==
- Sean McEwen as Ben Destin
- Nathan Bell as Pete Destin
- Jacob Head as Nicky 'D'
- Francesca Caro as Mrs. Destin

== Awards ==
2002 Crown Awards

- Gold Crown Award for Best Youth Film
- Silver Crown Award for Best Drama Under $250,000
