= Homeless for the Holidays =

- Directed by: George A. Johnson
- Written by: George A. Johnson
- Produced by: George A. Johnson; Karen Johnson
- Starring: Matt Moore; Crystal Dewitt Hinkle; Cole Brandenberger; Gabrielle Phillips; Brad Stine
- Narrated by: Harley Akers
- Cinematography: Tyler Black
- Edited by: Axil Ramikus
- Music by: Matthew Wayne Murray
- Production company: Breathe Motion Pictures
- Distributed by: Bridgestone Multimedia Group
- Release date: October 16, 2009
- Country: United States
- Language: English
- Budget: $30,000
- Box office: $25,180

Homeless for the Holidays is a 2009 Christian-Christmas film by Breathe Motion Pictures. The film was directed by George A. Johnson, who previously directed Dreamer: The Movie. Shooting began on April 18, 2009, in Fort Wayne, Indiana. In January 2010, it was released theatrically for a limited time, including a special screening sponsored by The Dove Foundation at Celebration! Cinema in Grand Rapids, Michigan.

== Plot ==
Jack Baker is a self-made executive who lives an upper-middle-class life–until he loses his job, and finds himself working at a burger restaurant to make ends meet. To make things worse, ends are not being met, and, if something doesn't change soon, his family could lose everything by Christmas.

== Cast ==
- Matt Moore as Jack Baker
- Crystal Dewitt-Hinkle as Sheryl Baker
- Cole Brandenberger as Adam Baker
- Gabrielle Phillips as Michelle Baker
- Brad Stine as a Supermarket Manager
- David Sisco as Wesley

== See also ==
- List of Christmas films
