= Like Dandelion Dust =

- Theatrical release poster
- Directed by: Jon Gunn
- Screenplay by: Stephen J. Rivele; Michael Lachance
- Produced by: Kevin Downes; Bobby Downes; Kerry David; Bill Herren
- Starring: Mira Sorvino; Barry Pepper; Cole Hauser; Kate Levering; Maxwell Perry Cotton; L. Scott Caldwell
- Cinematography: Reynaldo Villalobos
- Edited by: Jon Gunn
- Music by: Nathan Larson
- Production companies: Downes Brothers Entertainment; Lucky Crow Films
- Distributed by: 20th Century Fox Home Entertainment
- Release dates: February 25, 2009 (Sedona); September 24, 2010
- Running time: 100 minutes
- Country: United States
- Language: English
- Box office: $352,810

Like Dandelion Dust is a 2009 drama film directed by Jon Gunn and based on the novel of the same name by Karen Kingsbury. The film won 26 awards at 23 film festivals.

== Plot ==
Two police officers knock on the door of a home and a drunk man answers. Rip Porter and his wife Wendy live there. The officers explain they are checking on an emergency call and find Rip drunk and Wendy injured. They arrest him, and he is sent to prison.

Seven years later, Rip is released. He has changed; he is now sober and has taken anger management courses. When Rip suggests starting a family, Wendy reveals that she gave birth to their son while he was in prison but gave the baby up for adoption to the Campbells who live in Florida. Rip immediately wants custody of his son, and has a right to do so as Wendy forged his signature on the adoption papers.

Jack and Molly Campbell have enjoyed an idyllic life with Joey, Wendy and Rip's son. When a judge upholds Rip and Wendy's claim, the Campbells are distraught. Joey's first visit with Wendy and Rip goes exceptionally well.

As a last resort, Jack travels to Ohio and offers Rip money in exchange for Joey. He refuses, and gets in a physical altercation with him. Since this confrontation, Rip starts drinking again due to stress. On the next visit when Joey refuses to take a shower, Rip is at first patient but eventually loses his temper. He roughly forces Joey into the shower, unintentionally leaving a bruise on his arm.

Before Joey leaves, Wendy tells him about making a wish by blowing on a dandelion. Once he is gone, she tells Rip that she arranged for Joey to spend an extra week with Jack and Molly. This upsets him and he seriously assaults Wendy.

When Joey returns home, he shows his bruise to Jack and Molly and tells them what happened. Molly convinces Jack they should flee the country with the boy. They join a church mission trip to Haiti, with Molly's sister and her husband. Jack has arranged for the three of them to fly out to another country.

However, Molly's sister is suspicious and calls Allyson Bower, the child services agent in charge of Joey's case. The Campbells are returned to the US where they meet with the caseworker and Wendy. A regretful Rip agrees to receive help and guidance for his alcoholism and anger problems in the hope of becoming a better man.

Wendy tells the Campbells that Rip never meant to hurt Joey, but that he is not ready to be a father. Jack apologizes to her for trying to bribe Rip. Ultimately, she agrees to hand the boy over to them permanently and signs a revised adoption paper with Rip's signature. As Wendy bids Joey goodbye, she expresses her hopes that she and Rip can have a relationship with him when he grows older.

== Cast ==
- Mira Sorvino as Wendy Porter
- Barry Pepper as Rip Porter
- Cole Hauser as Jack Campbell
- Kate Levering as Molly Campbell
- Maxwell Perry Cotton as Joey Campbell
- L. Scott Caldwell as Allyson Bower
- Abby Brammell as Beth Norton

== Release ==
The film was released in the United States September 23, 2010. The Times-Colonist named it as one of "10 films you will want to watch" at the Victoria Film Festival.

The film was relatively successful, earning $77,960 on its opening weekend, in just 25 theaters. It was then expanded to 60 theaters, and by the end of its run, earned a domestic total of $352,810.

== Reception ==
The film was well received by critics. On Rotten Tomatoes, 88% of critics gave the film a positive review, based on 16 reviews. Michael Ordona of the Los Angeles Times remarked, "'Like Dandelion Dust' is a well-acted, earnest film about adoptive parents' worst nightmare, dealing sympathetically with all parties in a lose-lose situation." Neil Genzlinger of The New York Times praised the film and said, "There's no denying that the acting in Like Dandelion Dust, an adoption drama directed by Jon Gunn from a novel by Karen Kingsbury, is superb."

== Awards ==
Deauville Film Festival

2009 Won "Première" Award Feature Film: Bobby Downes

Heartland Film Festival

2009 Won Audience Award Best Dramatic Feature: Kerry David, Bobby Downes, Kevin Downes, Jon Gunn

Las Vegas International Film Festival

2009 Won Grand Jury Prize Best Feature:

Best Feature: Bobby Downes, Kevin Downes, Kerry David

Jury Prize Best Actor: Barry Pepper

New York VisionFest

2009 Won Film Competition Award Acting (Female Lead): Mira Sorvino

Acting (Male Lead): Barry Pepper

Production: Bobby Downes, Kevin Downes, Kerry David

Writing: Michael Lachance, Stephen J. Rivele

San Diego Film Festival

2009 Won Festival Award Best Actress: Mira Sorvino

San Luis Obispo International Film Festival

2009 Won George Sidney Independent Film Competition - Special Jury Prize Best Feature: Jon Gunn, Kerry David, Kevin Downes, Bobby Downes

Sedona International Film Festival

2009 Won Audience Award Best Feature: Kerry David, Jon Gunn, Kevin Downes, Bobby Downes

Best Feature: Bobby Downes, Kevin Downes, Kerry David

Sonoma Valley Film Festival

2009 Won Audience Award Best Picture: Kevin Downes, Bobby Downes, Kerry David, Jon Gunn

Honorable Mention Best Actor: Maxwell Perry Cotton

Jury Award Best Actress: Mira Sorvino

Best Narrative Feature: Bobby Downes, Kevin Downes, Kerry David

Stony Brook Film Festival

2009 Won Audience Choice Award Best Feature: Kerry David, Kevin Downes, Bobby Downes

Vail Film Festival

2009 Won Audience Award Best Feature: Kevin Downes, Bobby Downes, Kerry David, Jon Gunn
