= Christmas with a Capital C =

- Directed by: Helmut Schleppi
- Written by: Andrea Gyertson Nasfell
- Starring: Ted McGinley; Daniel Baldwin; Nancy Stafford; Brad Stine
- Music by: Edwin Wendler
- Release date: December 5, 2010
- Running time: 81 minutes
- Country: United States
- Language: English

Christmas with a Capital C is a 2010 American Christian comedy-drama direct-to-DVD film directed by Helmut Schleppi. The film's plot was based on a song of the same name by Christian band Go Fish, whose name was inspired by one of actor Brad Stine's stand-up comedy routines. It centers on what, in recent years, has been dubbed the "War on Christmas" in the United States.

== Plot ==
Christmas has always been an exceptional time of love and tradition in the small town of Trapper Falls, Alaska. Hometown of Mayor Dan Reed (Ted McGinley) looks forward to each year with enthusiasm to all the events, friends and family that fill this special season. Together with his brother Greg (Brad Stine), they dedicate time away from their adventure tour company to drape the town is Christmas cheer. When Dan's old high school rival Mitch Bright (Daniel Baldwin), a mean-spirited and embittered militant atheist returns home after 20 years, Dan is immediately suspicious. Mitch is a highly successful big city lawyer who has never wanted anything to do with Trapper Falls. The rivalry re-ignites when the frustrated Mitch takes offense to what he sees as the town's violation of his rights. Mitch wants the Nativity scene removed from the front of City hall and the word Christmas switched to Happy Holidays on all signs. Fifty years of tradition are now challenged not by an outsider, but a former member of the community. As the conflict escalates, it goes beyond one person's opinion but magnifies into an entire town problem when Mitch enters into the mayoral race to have Dan replaced.

In the heat of the legal battle and facing certain defeat, Dan's wife Kristen (Nancy Stafford) and their daughter Makayla (Francesca Derosa), desiring to reveal what she believes to be the true spirit of Christmas, they are motivated to initiate a "Christmas with a Capital C" campaign to unite the town. In the process, they uncover the reason behind Mitch's return: he is searching for love and acceptance, which he cannot find in his world of high-flown success.

== Cast ==
- Ted McGinley as Dan Reed
- Daniel Baldwin as Mitch Bright
- Nancy Stafford as Kristen Reed
- Brad Stine as Greg Reed
- Cooper Peltz as Cody Reed
- Ron Holmstrom as Rev. Tiller

== Release ==
Originally, the Pureflix Entertainment website accepted pre-sale orders for the film in late 2010, with an original DVD release date of November 2, 2010. Without explanation, the pre-order link was removed sometime in the fall. On November 22, 2010, the Gospel Music Channel announced that it would air the film during the 2010 Christmas season. The film broadcast several times from December 5, 2010 until December 25, 2010. The film was also shown in select theaters and churches. Pureflix later updated their website to set the DVD release for November 8, 2011, eventually revising that date to November 1, 2011.

== Reception ==
Prior to the film's release, the film's trailer sparked ridicule and criticism on several blogs, news sites, and discussion forums including the British comedy panel show 8 out of 10 Cats. The Portland Mercury and others characterized the trailer as "anti-atheist". Some reviewers have pointed to similarities with the Grinch tale. The film itself was mostly reviewed by Christian organizations such as the Dove Foundation, which reviewed it favorably. The film won the Faith & Freedom Award for Television at the 2011 Movieguide Awards.

== Log lines ==
In Pureflix's promotional materials, the film's title is often accompanied by the log line, "Putting Christ Back in Christmas". GMCTV, in their promotional materials, opted for the log line, "The Reason for the Season".

== See also ==
- List of Christmas films
