= The Sound of a Dirt Road =

- Directed by: Graham D. Alexander
- Written by: Graham D. Alexander
- Produced by: Danny Alexander; Erin Alexander
- Starring: Ross Renfroe; Jenny Hamilton
- Music by: Taylor Davis
- Production company: MyShow Productions
- Release date: August 8, 2008
- Running time: 119 minutes
- Country: United States
- Language: English
- Budget: $900

The Sound of a Dirt Road is a 2008 Christian film directed by Graham D. Alexander. In less than a year, Alexander wrote, directed and filmed the movie East Texas, for less than $900. The Sound of a Dirt Road was featured at the San Antonio Independent Christian Film Festival. It was chosen as one of eight finalists in the feature film category, out of 50 submissions.

== Plot ==
John Crowe (Ross Renfroe) is a rancher whose family has owned and managed the Crowe Ranch for over 150 years. John meets Ellen Sower, and his life slowly begins to change. Jeremiah Stillwell, the soon-to-be pastor of the local church, also becomes interested in Ellen. Intellectual warfare ensues as John rescues Ellen, then learns she is deathly ill. Jeremiah desires power, and once he gets it, he goes after John.
