= Song Man =

- Directed by: Trevor L. Smith
- Written by: Dan Olds; Trevor L. Smith
- Produced by: Dan Olds; Trevor L. Smith; Robert M. Wilcox
- Cinematography: Larry J. Rutledge
- Edited by: Trevor L. Smith
- Production companies: SmithHouse Entertainment; Yeshuateinu Company
- Release date: February 2, 2009
- Running time: 89 minutes
- Country: United States
- Language: English
- Budget: $20,000

Song Man is a 2009 Christian comedy-drama film directed by Trevor L. Smith. It was co-produced by Dan Olds, Trevor L. Smith and Robert M. Wilcox, and was also co-wrote by Dan Olds and Trevor L. Several of Olds' family members appeared in the film. Smith. The film was released to DVD on February 2, 2009.

== Plot ==
Song Man is the story of David, an out of work musician struggling with life, love, and faith. He's unaware that people worldwide are following his music and spiritual journey through the songs he writes; among them, some contract killers trying to prevent him from claiming the inheritance that rightfully belongs to him.

== Release ==
Song Man premiered at the 2008 Christian Game Developers Conference. The film was also featured at the Sabaoth International Film Festival. It was released to DVD on February 2, 2009 by SmithHouse Entertainment and Yeshuateinu Company.
