= Bringing Up Bobby (2009 film) =

- Directed by: Chris Staron
- Written by: Chris Staron
- Produced by: Chris Staron; Nick Staron
- Starring: Alex Hinsky
- Cinematography: Nick Staron
- Edited by: Nick Staron
- Music by: Andrew Griffiths
- Production company: Glowing Nose
- Distributed by: Christiano Film Group
- Release date: May 15, 2009
- Running time: 93 minutes
- Country: United States
- Language: English

Bringing Up Bobby is a 2009 Christian direct-to-video comedy film directed by Chris Staron. It was the third film by Glowing Nose, who previously made Pint Size and Between the Walls.

== Plot ==
Fifteen-year-old Bobby Wyler is challenged to figure out who he is and what he believes, but he doesn't succeed. His parents' will is read, he falls in love and child services take away his best friend. Now he must choose the path for his life before his circumstances choose it for him.

== Reception ==
Angela Walker of ChristianCinema.com gave the film 4/5 stars, saying, "Parents will enjoy this film because it contains good messages about families and finding your identity in Christ. Some teenagers will enjoy the comedic nature and probably see themselves in the search for identity."
