= The One Lamb =

- Directed by: Bryan Forrest
- Written by: Bryan Forrest
- Starring: Bryan Forrest; John W. Price; Alyson Lowe; Anna Holmes
- Production company: University City United Methodist Church
- Release date: March 30, 2009
- Country: United States
- Language: English

The One Lamb is a 2009 American Christian film directed by Bryan Forrest, set to be released on March 30, 2009. It stars John W. Price, Alyson Lowe, Anna Holmes and Bryan Forrest. It is unrated. It was financed by University City United Methodist Church, in North Carolina.

== Plot ==
The One Lamb is the story of Jackson Price (Bryan Forrest) who is diagnosed with cancer, and determined to atone for the sins of his past. He once had everything going his way, but in a moment of weakness he lost everything. He was abandoned by his wife, learns he is dying of cancer, and may not live long. But he's determined to fight, and with a little help from a pastor named Earl (John W. Price), he tries to achieve redemption for his past failures while hoping and praying for a happy, healthy future.
