= Mercy Streets =

- Directed by: Jon Gunn
- Written by: Jon Gunn; John Mann
- Produced by: Bobby Downes; Kevin Downes; Jon Gunn; Geoff Ludlow; Travis Mann; David A. R. White
- Starring: Eric Roberts; David White; Cynthia Watros; Stacy Keach
- Cinematography: Chris Magee
- Music by: Steffan Fantini
- Production company: Signal Hill Production
- Distributed by: Con Dios Entertainment; Providence Entertainment; ChristianCinema.com
- Release date: October 31, 2000
- Running time: 106 minutes
- Country: United States
- Language: English
- Budget: $600,000
- Box office: $173,599

Mercy Streets is a 2000 Christian action drama film written and directed by Jon Gunn. It starred Eric Roberts and Stacy Keach, among others.

== Plot ==
Mercy Streets is the story of twin brothers, John (David White), a con man and Jeremiah (David White), a pastor, who are forced to switch lives. After being released from prison, John is looking to make a new start, and agrees to work for his father figure and mentor Rome (Eric Roberts). When John attempts to double cross Rome, it sets off a chain reaction which turns the lives of both brothers into turmoil. While on the run from Rome, John steps into the calm suburban life of his twin brother Jeremiah and turns his good life upside down.

Jeremiah, a well-loved and respected priest, is forced into the criminal underworld of his brother when he is taken hostage by Rome and blackmailed into taking part in a counterfeiting scam. Haunted by the guilt of what he believes to be his brother's death, Jeremiah struggles to atone for his wrongdoing and redeem his faith by going along with the plan. However, Rome's simple plan begins to go horribly wrong when Jeremiah escapes and comes face to face with the brother he thought was dead. They both cannot turn away from the consequences of their actions or the love and forgiveness of God.

== Cast ==
- Eric Roberts as Rome
- David A. R. White as John / Jeremiah
- Cynthia Watros as Sam
- Shiek Mahmud-Bey as Tex
- Lawrence Taylor as Dan
- Stacy Keach as Tom
- Robert LaSardo as T.J.
- Lisa Furst as Sunny
- Kevin Downes as Peter
- Robert Lyon Rasner as Concerned Passerby

== Reception ==
On review aggregator website Rotten Tomatoes, the film has an approval rating of 13% based on eight reviews. The average rating was 4.1/10. Metacritic, another review aggregator, assigned the film a weighted average score of 28 out of 100, based on five critics.

Kevin Thomas of the Los Angeles Times said, "Despite a competent cast and all the energy Roberts in particular contributes, the filmmakers cannot sustain enough momentum to keep their film from seeming contrived and preachy." Ted Baehr of Movieguide said, "Mercy Streets is a masterful piece of moviemaking with a strong Gospel message."
