= Sean McGowan =

American activist and writer

Sean McGowan (born Sean Paul Michael McGowan; December 21, 1950), is an American activist and writer.

== Career ==
As a writer, he was one of the subset of American writers to publish photographic novels, similar to photo novels in that they are both literary and graphic, yet distinguished from them by using photography instead of illustrations. His writing focuses on wide world views and macro issues from social justice to the neuroscience of warfare.

McGowan has become known for the release of his work into the public domain.

One book, Click Click Snap (2007) was written during his travels through the Middle East and is a modern example of literary nonfiction.

== Bibliography ==
- Salisbury Steak (2004)
- Click Click Snap (2007)

== See also ==
- Michael S. Hart
