= God Help Me (film) =

- Directed by: Reece Tedford
- Written by: Dan Olds
- Produced by: Dan Olds
- Cinematography: Lance Tedford
- Edited by: Lance Tedford
- Music by: Lance Tedford
- Production company: Duststorm Production
- Distributed by: CustomFlix
- Release date: July 13, 2006
- Running time: 80 minutes
- Country: United States
- Language: English
- Budget: $15,000

God Help Me is a 2006 American Christian direct-to-video romantic comedy film written and produced by Dan Olds. It was directed by Reece Tedford, and stars Tom Miner, George Moss, Jim Anderson, Candace Orrino and Shelley Findley. The film was produced by Dust Storm Productions, and distributed on July 13, 2006 by CustomFlix.

== Plot ==
Trudy is the girl of Ryan's dreams, but Trudy is waiting for God to tell her who she should marry; Ryan is not what she had in mind. When Ryan's friends discover this they create a plan behind Ryan's back to convince Trudy that God has chosen her to be with Ryan. With less than brilliant ideas, each plan backfires and each scheme gets more ridiculous. As his friends Jack, Lon, and Bridgett dig themselves deeper into trouble, they try to rationalize and justify each scheme to convince Trudy.

== Cast ==
- Tom Miner as Ryan
- George Moss as Jack
- Jim Anderson as Lon
- Candace Orrino as Bridgett
- Shelley Findley as Trudy

== Production ==
God Help Me started when producer Dan Olds wrote the screenplay, and he later worked with Duststorm Productions on preparation of film. The project was financed with $15,000, and the production was very low-budget. The movie was shot in Missouri and mostly used local cast and crew. It was shot over a period of fourteen days.

== Reception ==
Brett Hunt of the Seattle Post-Intelligencer gave the film a mixed review, saying, "I think to a Christian audience this might be an ok movie..." The film won the "Best Film Under $25,000" award at the Creation Arts Festival.
