= Persecuted (film) =

- Theatrical release poster
- Directed by: Daniel Lusko
- Written by: Daniel Lusko
- Produced by: Daniel Lusko; James R. Higgins; Gray Frederickson; Jerry D. Simmons
- Starring: James Remar; Bruce Davison; Dean Stockwell; Gretchen Carlson; Raoul Trujillo; Natalie Grant; Brad Stine; Fred Dalton Thompson
- Cinematography: Richard J. Vialet
- Edited by: Brian Brinkman
- Music by: Chris Ridenhour
- Production company: One Media
- Distributed by: Millennium Entertainment
- Release date: July 18, 2014
- Running time: 91 minutes
- Country: United States
- Language: English
- Box office: $1.6 million

Persecuted is a 2014 American Christian political thriller film written and directed by Daniel Lusko and starring James Remar, Bruce Davison, Dean Stockwell, Gretchen Carlson, Raoul Trujillo, Natalie Grant, Brad Stine, and Fred Thompson.

== Plot summary ==
Reformed drug addict and America's leading evangelist John Luther opposes Senator Donald Harrison's Faith and Fairness Act, which would not allow Christians to state that they have the whole or only truth. To destroy Luther's credibility and to ensure passage of the bill, Harrison has Luther framed for the rape and murder of a teenaged girl.

== Cast ==
- James Remar as John Luther
- Bruce Davison as Senator Donald Harrison
- Dean Stockwell as Dave Wilson
- Raoul Trujillo as Mr. Gray
- Fred Thompson as Fr. Charles Luther
- Natalie Grant as Monica Luther
- Gretchen Carlson as Diana Lucas
- Brad Stine as Pastor Ryan Morris

== Production ==
Based on an original story created by director Daniel Lusko, principal photography for the film took place in Albuquerque, New Mexico. The movie was screened at the February 2014 National Religious Broadcasters convention in Nashville, Tennessee, and in March 2014 at the Conservative Political Action Conference in Washington, DC

== Other media ==
Persecuted has been adapted into a book by Robin Parrish.

== Release ==
Persecuted was released theatrically on July 18, 2014.

=== Critical reception ===
The film was widely panned by critics and is one of the worst-reviewed films of 2014. The review aggregator website Rotten Tomatoes reported a 0% approval rating with an average rating of 2.6/10 based on 14 reviews. Metacritic, which uses a weighted average, assigned a score of 11 out of 100 based on nine reviews, indicating "overwhelming dislike".

New York Times film critic Neil Genzlinger wrote, "This terrible attempt at a political thriller for the religious right is aimed not at Christians in general but at a certain breed of them, the kind who feel as if the rest of the world were engaged in a giant conspiracy against their interpretation of good and truth."

Justin Chang of Variety concluded his scathing review with, "At a time when the world offers us no shortage of examples of what actual religious persecution looks like, for a film to indulge in this particular brand of self-righteous fearmongering isn’t just clueless or reckless; it’s an act of contemptible irresponsibility."

Focus on the Family said, "Philosophically, the movie compels us to grapple with what it looks like to have religious freedom in our modern world. It asks, Do we still have it in America? And it goes to some length, story-wise, to reinforce how important such freedom is....Indeed, religious freedom is a very big deal. It is the bedrock upon which America was founded. And while the sort of vicious persecution Christians currently experience in some other countries is not a reality here in the United States, many American Christians already feel that their faith is under attack...[Persecuted] has its problems, both in terms of content and plot and even message. But its subject is a timely one, well worth putting much more thought into than most of us usually do."
