= Kevin Downes =

American actor

- Occupations: Actor, director, producer, writer
- Years active: 1994–present
- Spouse: Catherine Downes (m. 1997)
- Family: Bobby Downes (brother)

Kevin Downes is an American actor, writer, producer, director, and co-founder and Chief of Production and Distribution of Kingdom Story Company. Downes grew up in Visalia, three hours north of Los Angeles. Many of the Christian films he participated in were shot there.

== Life and career ==
In 2000, he produced the film Mercy Streets which was nominated for the Best Family Film Award.

In 2003, Downes wrote, produced, directed and starred in Six: The Mark Unleashed opposite Stephen Baldwin, Eric Roberts, David A. R. White and Jeffrey Dean Morgan. The film was released wide in June 2004.

In 2011, Downes starred in the film Courageous, directed by Alex Kendrick. In 2015, he produced Woodlawn.

In 2018, he started Kingdom Story Company along with the Erwin Brothers.

In 2020, he produced I Still Believe.

== Personal life ==
Downes lives in Visalia, California with his wife Catherine and dog Darby. He is the younger brother of producer Bobby Downes who is the founder and CEO of ChristianCinema.com.

== Filmography ==
=== Actor ===
Year	Title	Role
1994	The Crossing	Jason
1995	End of the Harvest	Jess
1998	Senseless	Smythe-Bates Finalist
1999	A Vow to Cherish	Paramedic
1999	The Moment After	Charles Baker
2000	Mercy Streets	Peter
2002	Time Changer	Greg
2004	Birdie & Bogey	Zach Cornell
2004	Bobby Jones: Stroke of Genius	Gene Homans
2004	Six: The Mark Unleashed	Jerry Willis
2006	Midnight Clear	Rick
2006	The Moment After 2: The Awakening	Charles Baker
2006	Thr3e	Henry
2011	Courageous	Shane Fuller
2013	Silver Bells	Ref #1
2013	Taken by Grace	Detective Gunderson
2014	Moms' Night Out	Kevin
2014	Redeemed	Ryan
2015	Faith of Our Fathers	John
2015	Woodlawn	Birmingham Reporter
2018	I Can Only Imagine	Singleton
2020	Beckman	Dan
2025	The Unbreakable Boy	Lyle

=== Producer ===
Year	Title
1999	The Moment After
2000	Mercy Streets
2001	Lay It Down
2002	Time Changer
2004	Six: The Mark Unleashed
2006	Midnight Clear
2006	The Visitation
2006	The Moment After 2: The Awakening
2007	The List
2009	Like Dandelion Dust
2013	The Lost Medallion: The Adventures of Billy Stone
2014	Moms' Night Out
2015	Faith of Our Fathers
2015	Woodlawn
2018	I Can Only Imagine
2020	I Still Believe
2021	American Underdog: The Kurt Warner Story
2024	The Best Christmas Pageant Ever
2025	The Unbreakable Boy
2025	Sarah's Oil
2026	I Can Only Imagine 2

=== Writer ===
Year	Title
1999	The Moment After
2004	Six: The Mark Unleashed
2015	Faith of Our Fathers (film)

=== Director ===
Year	Title
2004	Six: The Mark Unleashed
2012	Amazing Love
