= Side Order =

- Production company: Oakwood Baptist Church
- Release date: December 4, 2009
- Country: United States
- Language: English
- Budget: $5,000

Side Order is a 2009 Christian-Christmas film by Oakwood Media Productions, a ministry of Oakwood Baptist Church in Chickamauga, Georgia. The film is Oakwood Baptist Church's third feature film production. The story of Side Order centers on five characters in a small town during the week of Christmas.

== Plot ==
The story centers on Roy’s Grill, a fixture in the town since 1934. People drop by and see their friends. While they are at the restaurant everything is well. It is Christmastime and you see love is at its purest and the Gospel presented, along with the true meaning of Christmas. It all happens at a place where the best things in life are not on the menu.

== Production ==
Director Bobby Daniels said the movie is akin to The Andy Griffith Show meets Cheers. Approximately 60–70 percent of Side Order was shot in Roy's Grill, a Rossville, Georgia eatery. In addition to Rossville, the film was shot in Chattanooga Valley, Chickamauga, Blairsville, and Ellijay, all in Georgia, as well as Chattanooga, Tennessee between May–November 2009. The production cost of the film was between $1,500 and $2,000 (with presentation costs factored in, production costs ended around $5,000).

The church's media department makes up the crew of about 40 people, in addition to more than 50 actors in the film.

The soundtrack was recorded by Corey Forrester and Chase Robertson featuring the song, "Mama's in Prison this Christmas".

== Release ==
The movie was played at 7:00 pm, Friday, December 4, 2009, at Oakwood Baptist Church. Additional showings aired at 4:00 pm and 7:00 pm on Saturday and Sunday.
