= Six: The Mark Unleashed =

- Directed by: Kevin Downes
- Written by: Kevin Downes; Chipper Lowell; David A. R. White
- Produced by: Bobby Downes; Kevin Downes; Cosimo Michael Occhipinti; David A. R. White
- Starring: Stephen Baldwin; Eric Roberts; Kevin Downes; David A. R. White; Jeffrey Dean Morgan
- Cinematography: Philip Hurn
- Edited by: Jeffrey Lee Hollis
- Music by: Marc Fantini; Steffan Fantini
- Distributed by: Trinity Broadcasting Network
- Release date: June 29, 2004
- Running time: 104 minutes
- Country: United States
- Language: English

Six: The Mark Unleashed is a 2004 Christian action-drama film directed by Kevin Downes and starring Stephen Baldwin, Kevin Downes, David A. R. White, Eric Roberts, and Jeffrey Dean Morgan. It was released June 29, 2004, and debuted at #6 on the Christian Booksellers Association Best Sellers List.

== Plot ==
The film is set in the end-times, or The Great Tribulation, after the rapture, when the earth has been taken over by the Antichrist (known as the "Leader"), and the mark of the beast - an implant in the right hands and/or foreheads - is being imposed on everyone worldwide. Those who take the mark become part of 'The Community', those who refuse are arrested, jailed and after three weeks are beheaded on the guillotines.

Two non-Christian renegades steal a car for a friend who has also refused the mark. When they arrive at his place they find that he reconsidered and took the mark and "feels so much happier". The two are then captured by police and taken to jail.

Smuggler Tom Newman is also captured by a police unit led by Jeseca Newman, his ex-wife who took the mark. He is tortured until he agrees to infiltrate a Christian group in the jail in order to execute Elijah Cohen, a Christian rebel leader who remains at large. Jeseca warns him if he tries to escape, he will be caught and turned over to Preston Scott, to be tortured.

All three of them meet in jail and decide to try and escape, to a place called Prodigal City, a safe haven for those who are non-citizens. Brody and Tom do not like this city and try to leave. Preston Scott meets up with them, and the two men are tortured. Tom refuses the mark and is beheaded, but Brody accepts, and claims, "It was the wrong choice."

== Cast ==
- Stephen Baldwin as Luke
- David A. R. White as Brody Sutton
- Kevin Downes as Jerry Willis
- Jeffrey Dean Morgan as Tom Newman
- Eric Roberts as Dallas
- Brad Heller as Preston Scott
- Amy Moon as Jeseca Newman
- Andrea Logan White as Prison Guard
- Troy Winbush as Luis
- Mike Norris as Mutant (uncredited)

== Critical reception ==
Reviews were mixed, with film critic David Nusair calling it an "utterly worthless piece of work" and giving it zero out of four stars. Evangelical reviewers were much kinder. Christian Ted Baehr of Movieguide described it as an "entertaining movie and a useful tool for leading people to consider the claims of the Gospel." Christian author John Hagee said of the film, “The power of the gospel to transform the lives of the characters is shown with deeply moving reality. So real is the presentation of the plan of salvation in this movie, the viewer will be left without excuse.” Evangelist Jack Van Impe was quoted as saying, “Both Rexella [his wife] and I believe this to be the greatest religious release we have ever watched. I know you will be tremendously moved as never before when viewing this Holy Spirit led production.”
