= Different Drummers =

- Directed by: Don Caron, Lyle Hatcher
- Produced by: Marc Dahlstrom
- Starring: Brayden Tucker; Ethan Reed McKay
- Distributed by: Bridgestone Multimedia, Heritage Films
- Release date: April 12, 2013
- Running time: 107 minutes
- Country: United States
- Language: English

Different Drummers is a 2013 American coming-of-age and drama film. It tells the story about the bond of two American elementary school boys in North Spokane, Washington, USA during the 1960s with different disorders they are struggling with, one with attention deficit disorder and the other with progressively-worsening muscular dystrophy. One of the boys' evolving concept and relationship with God is a central theme for the film. It stars Brayden Tucker, and Ethan Reed as the main characters. It was filmed in late 2012 in Spokane, Washington.
