= Ken Horstmann =

American film and television director (born 1971)

- Born: Kenneth Ray Horstmann; April 10, 1971 (age 55); Norfolk, Virginia, USA

Ken Horstmann (born April 10, 1971) is an American film and television director. He was born in Norfolk, Virginia.

== Early career ==
Ken graduated from Mount Paran Christian School in (1990). He began his career at Turner Broadcasting in Atlanta, Georgia as a tape operator. Eventually, this led him to directing commercials and television series. He has directed numerous music videos, namely for Family Force 5. The video for "Never Let Me Go" was nominated for a 2008 GMA Dove Award.

== Television and film ==
His television series credits for Cartoon Network include Fridays, Fried Dynamite, and "The Break" (premiering in 2009). He also directs "Vital Signs" for CNN International, hosted by Dr. Sanjay Gupta.

His first feature entitled Upside starring Randall Bentley of NBC's "Heroes" and based on his script, released October 5, 2010.

== Filmography ==
Feature Films

Year	Title	Director	Producer	Writer
2002	Autorequiem	Yes	Yes	Yes
2004	Transmission	Yes	Yes	Yes
2010	Upside	Yes	Yes	Yes
2012	Custom Modifications	Yes	Yes	Yes
2016	High Cotton	Yes	Yes	Yes

Documentary Films

Year	Title	Director	Producer	Writer
2019	Bullitt Proof	Yes	Yes	Yes

Television Series

Year	Title	Director	Producer	Writer
2002	Saturday Night Solution	Yes	No	No
2006	Cartoon Cartoon Fridays	Yes (musical scenes)	No	No
