= Upside (film) =

2010 film by Ken Horstmann

- Directed by: Ken Horstmann
- Written by: Ken Horstmann
- Produced by: Casey Wallace; Andrew Grein; Adam Callner
- Starring: Randall Bentley; Leah Sims; Taylor St. Clair; Jeremy Harrison; Blair Jasin
- Cinematography: Pete Wages
- Edited by: Ken Horstmann; Myron Vazquez
- Music by: Christian Wood
- Production company: Spyplane Films
- Distributed by: Provident Films
- Release date: October 5, 2010
- Running time: 106 minutes
- Country: United States
- Language: English

Upside is a 2010 American dramatic film written and directed by Ken Horstmann and starring Randall Bentley. It is set in Atlanta, Georgia.

== Plot ==
High school senior Solomon White pretty much has his future as a college lacrosse player laid out for him till a concussion has him seeing everything upside-down. Not knowing how long this condition will take to right itself, Solomon meets lecturer Wren Woods at a support group for the visually impaired (mostly all blind, as is she). With future plans at least on hold, he begins hanging out with her, who - along with Mrs. Buck (Solomon's English teacher) and Prof. Craig Parker (a writing mentor Mrs. Buck arranged for Solomon) - guides Solomon into becoming a man who can make decisions for himself and into considering accepting Christ in his life.

== Production ==
The lacrosse scenes in the film were staged by Richie Meade, head coach for the United States Naval Academy.

Solomon Olds and Jacob Olds from Family Force 5 appear in the film dancing in the scene that features their song, along with Solomon's wife Lauren.

According to the closing credits the film was shot all on location in seven cities in and around Atlanta.

== Music ==
Upside features an original score by Christian Wood.

The soundtrack includes songs by Family Force 5, Drew Holcomb and The Neighbors, and Sony Music Nashville artist Corey Crowder.

Songs by Family Force 5

- "Radiator"

Songs by Corey Crowder

- "Small Town"
- "Higher Ground"
- "What Was And Might Have Been"
- "Here's Looking At You Kid"
- "When My Ship Comes In"
- "The Last Ones Standing"

Songs by Drew Holcomb and The Neighbors

- "The Wire"
- "Fire and Dynamite"

Songs by Drew Holcomb

- "I Like To Be With Me When I'm With You"

Songs by Johanna Horstmann

- "Even In My Darkness"

== Reception ==
- The film received the Dove Family Seal of Approval from The Dove Foundation. "This is an enjoyable film for the family, especially the teens in the house."
- "Upside is a unique, entertaining, inspiring movie... a clever metaphor for the human condition." -Ted Baehr | Movieguide
- "Upside is an inspiring film about faith and love that challenges us all to follow the unique path God has for us." - Mark Hall of Casting Crowns

== Accolades ==
=== Awards won ===
- 2010 Redemptive Storyteller Award by the Redemptive Film Festival (held at Regent University)

=== Nominations ===
- 2010 Transforming Stories International Christian Film Festival Semi-Finalist.
