= Carey Scott =

American actor, director, teacher and acting coach

- Born: June 21, 1965 (age 60); Los Angeles, California, U.S.
- Occupations: Actor; writer; director; acting coach
- Years active: 1983–present
- Height: 5 ft 7 in (1.70 m)

Carey Scott (born June 21, 1965) is an American actor, writer, director and acting coach. He was born in Los Angeles, California, U.S. His popular works are Bruce Almighty (2003), God's Not Dead 2 (2016) and Mad Men (2007).

== Film appearances ==
- Nerd, Gimme an "F" (also known as T & A Academy 2), 1984
- Rand, Making the Grade (also known as The Last American Preppy), C, 1984
- Kid in teller line, Prime Risk, 1985
- Male hustler, Distortions, 1987
- Ricky's friend, The 'burbs, 1989
- Young Spock, Star Trek V: The Final Frontier, 1989
- Ryes Wallstien, Diving In, 1990
- Supervisor Charlie, Top Dog, 1995
- Barrow, Rolling Thunder, 1996
- Bus announcer, Overkill, 1996
- Thomas, Forest Warrior, 1996
- Tony, Ripper Man, 1996
- Oren Ames, Bells of Innocence, 2003
- Partying Sports Guy, Bruce Almighty, 2003
- Father Lester Stillman, Birdie and Bogey, 2004
- Edward, Hidden Secrets, 2006
- Attorney, The Wager, 2007
- Detective Wopat, In the Blink of an Eye, 2009
- Howard, Holyman Undercover, 2010
- Daniel, Jerusalem Countdown, 2011
- Ted, Co-pilot, The Mark, 2012
- Joe Murphy, I am...Gabriel, 2012
- Deputy Cooper, Revelation Road, 2013
- Deputy Cooper, Revelation Road 2 The Sea of Glass and Fire, 2013
- Matt Ireland, Mission Air, 2014
- Officer Pepper, Faith of our Fathers, 2015
- Richard Thawley, God's Not Dead 2, 2016
- Roger, AmeriGeddon, 2016
- Matt Kravitz, The Encounter TV Series, 1 Episode, 2016
- Randy, Finding Love in Quarantine, 2020

=== Film codirector ===
- Birdie and Bogey, Norris Family Films, 2004

== Television appearances ==
=== Films ===
- Paul Fairgate, Not Quite Human, The Disney Channel, 1987
- Billy, The Corpse Had a Familiar Face, CBS, 1994
- Painter, As Good as Dead, USA Network, 1995
- Burton Moore, Bloodhounds, USA Network, 1996
- Bosun's mate, A Thousand Men and a Baby (also known as Narrow Escape), CBS, 1997
- Roland Hayfield, Home Invasion, NBC, 1997
- The man, The Lake, NBC, 1998
- Photographer, The Tiger Woods Story, Showtime, 1998
- Emergency room doctor, Dying to Live, UPN, 1999

=== Episodic ===
- Billy Porter, "Not with My Date You Don't", Jennifer Slept Here, NBC, 1983
- LeonGronich, "Fallout", AfterMASH, CBS, 1983
- Steve Kremsky, "Bunker Madness", Archie Bunker's Place, CBS, 1983
- Farleigh Dickson, "The Candidate", What's Happening Now!, syndicated, 1987
- Keith Ulrich, "Best Years of Your Life", 21 Jump Street, Fox, 1988
- Keith Ulrich, "Cory and Dean Got Married", 21 Jump Street, Fox, 1988
- Keith Ulrich, "Raising Marijuana", 21 Jump Street, Fox, 1988
- Keith Ulrich, "School's Out", 21 Jump Street, Fox, 1988
- "The Diary", Mr. Belvedere, ABC, 1988
- Jack, "The Art of Death", Freddy's Nightmares, syndicated, 1989
- Kevin, "Bad Blood", Silk Stalkings, USA Network, 1992
- Motorist, "Bonnie and Claire", Renegade, USA Network and syndicated, 1993
- Fourth police officer, "Along Came a Spider", One West Waikiki, CBS, 1994
- Roland, "Family Ties", Renegade, USA Network and syndicated, 1995
- Young police officer, "For Better, for Worse", Renegade, USA Network and syndicated, 1996
- Ron Lindhart, "Slip-Up", Silk Stalkings, USA Network, 1997
- Satcom officer, "Great Expectations", Pensacola: Wings of Gold, syndicated, 1998
- Baker, "Strange Bedfellows", Silk Stalkings, USA Network, 1999
- Ramsey, "Enter the Lost Galaxy", Power Rangers Lost Galaxy, Fox, 1999
- Billy Garza, "Perfect Frank", Cover Me: Based on the True Life of an FBI Family (also known as Cover Me), USA Network, 2000
- "Tiresias", The Invisible Man, Sci-Fi Channel, 2000
- Wes Tyson, "Reel Rangers", Walker, Texas Ranger, CBS, 2001
- Frank Sarducci, "Dead Heat", Hunter, NBC, 2003
- Video technician, "The Friendly Skies", Miracles, ABC, 2003
- Tourist with camera, "Return of the Kane", Veronica Mars, UPN, 2004
- (Uncredited) Frankie, "The Prince and the Plunger", The Suite Life of Zack and Cody (also known as The Suite Life), The Disney Channel, 2005
- Appeared as Steven Richardson, "As Good as Gold", The Judge, NBC.
