= Mission Pictures International =

American film producer and distributor

Mission Pictures International (MPI) is a foreign sales, finance, and distribution company specializing in family and faith-based entertainment for mainstream audiences worldwide.

Mission Pictures International (MPI) was founded in 2008 by entertainment industry veterans Cindy Bond and Chevonne O'Shaughnessy.

MRI has expanded its feature film and television programming brand, having produced over 200 family-friendly films including Like Dandelion Dust, The 5th Quarter, Seven Days in Utopia, I Can Only Imagine and Hallmark Channel's Enchanted Christmas and The Shunning.

Headquartered in Calabasas, California, with offices in Studio City and Van Nuys, MPI annually exhibits at major film and TV markets, including NATPE, Berlin International Film Festival, FILMART, MIP-TV, The Marche Du Film in Cannes, MIPCOM and AFM.

== Films distributed by MPI ==
| Title | Release date |
|---|---|
| Redeeming Love | 2022 |
| Love Finds You in Sugarcreek Ohio | 2014 |
| The Confession | 2012 |
| The Heart of Christmas | 2012 |
| The Encounter: Paradise Lost | 2012 |
| Escape | 2012 |
| The Mark: Redemption | 2012 |
| The Mark | 2012 |
| Hardflip | 2012 |
| I'm in Love with a Church Girl | 2012 |
| The Genesis Code | 2012 |
| Apostle Peter and the Last Supper | 2012 |
| Flatline | 2012 |
| Seven Days in Utopia | 2011 |
| The 5th Quarter | 2011 |
| The Shunning | 2011 |
| Trinity Goodheart | 2011 |
| Countdown | 2011 |
| My Last Day Without You | 2011 |
| Christmas with a Capital C | 2011 |
| Marriage Retreat | 2011 |
| Marcelino Pan y Vino | 2010 |
| Letters to God | 2010 |
| What If... | 2010 |
| The Way Home | 2010 |
| To Save a Life | 2009 |
| The Mighty Macs | 2009 |
| Like Dandelion Dust | 2009 |
| One Night with the King | 2006 |
| Bella | 2006 |
| The Omega Code | 1999 |
