= Byron M. Jones =

Canadian film producer

Byron M. Jones is a Christian film producer and managing partner of Pure Flix Entertainment.

== Career ==
Jones began his career in marketing at Cloud Ten Pictures in 1997, where he headed up the sales and marketing departments during the release of the best-selling Christian films such as Apocalypse, Revelation, Tribulation and Judgment, helping to develop international recognition and demand for quality Christian Movies. Byron maintained this position until January 2002.

Jones started his career as Cloud Ten's VP of Entertainment, bringing movies such as Left Behind to the industry. Left Behind was the #1 selling video in America its first week of release, beating out Toy Story 2 and The Green Mile.

While with Cloud Ten, Billboard Magazine quoted Byron as saying "There are 170 Million Americans who go to church every Sunday, most of these people want to see an edgy action movie without all the other stuff."

Canadian Christianity ran a story on Jones talking about the new studio that he would start in Niagara Falls, Canada, Garden City Pictures. Their first feature Home Beyond the Sun was a Christian film that examines contemporary China's dilemma of unwanted daughters in an overpopulated land of more than a billion souls. It is inspired by the true story of one of the children, the "found forsaken", finding familial love.

Byron founded Willowcreek Marketing and Distribution; a Christian marketing company which also is the official booking agency for the "Million Dollar Man" Ted DiBiase. Willowcreek is also responsible for the marketing and distribution of a documentary film be the Erwin Brothers about the events of 9/11/2001.

Beginning in January 2007, Jones became a Managing Partner with Pure Flix Entertainment. Byron along with musician Randy Travis, actor David A. R. White, Michael Scott, and Russell Wolfe. Pure Flix produced and distributed movies The Wager, Hidden Secrets, and Sarah's Choice.

CMD Distribution was a faith and family film distribution company, headquartered in Wake Forest, North Carolina. The company distributed, acquired Christian and family-friendly films. The company was forced to close after the Family Christian Stores filed for Chapter 11 Bankruptcy and the closer of Allegro

== Filmography ==
- Producer - A Long Way Off (2014)
- Producer - The Encounter (2011)
- Producer - Johnny (2010)
- Producer – Holyman Undercover (2010)
- Producer – Sarah's Choice (2009)
- Producer – In the Blink of an Eye (2009)
- Producer – The Wager (2007)
- Producer - Hidden Secrets (2006)
- Producer – Home Beyond the Sun (2004)
- Actor – In the Blink of an Eye (2009)

== Personal life ==
Born in North Bay, Ontario; Jones has a sone and two daughters. Jones is married. Byron is a practicing Christian.
