= William J. Bruce III =

Canadian writer (born 1980)

William J Bruce III
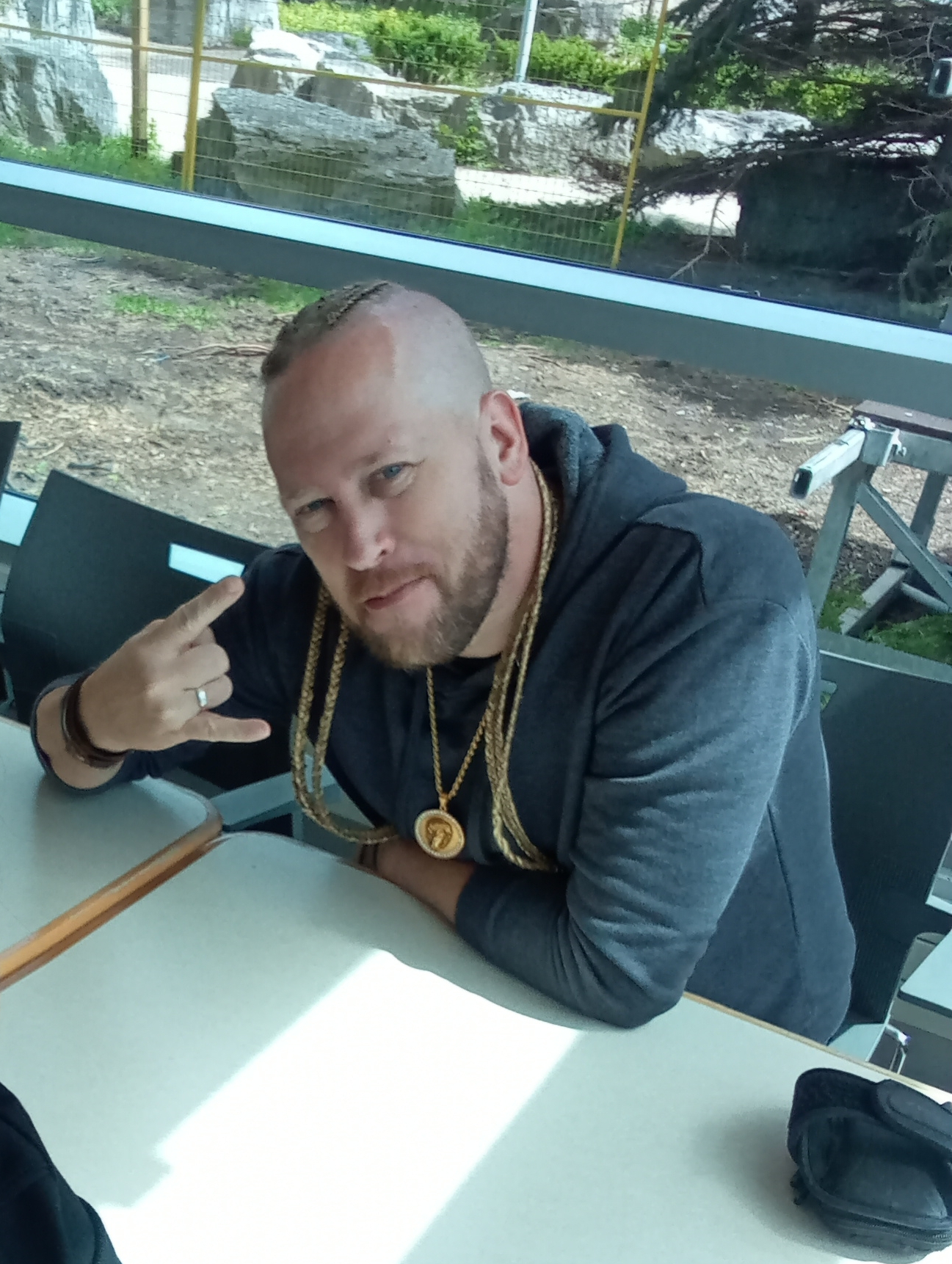
- William Bruce III at University of Guelph 2023
- Born: March 4, 1980 (age 46); Canada
- Education: Kingston College
- Occupations: writer; publicist; producer; actor
- Spouse: May
- Writing career
- Years active: 2007-present
- Website: williamjbruceiii.com

William J Bruce III (born March 4, 1980) is a writer, producer, and celebrity publicist who has represented clients who appeared in the NFL, MTV and WWE. He earned executive producer credits on the hip-hop compilation album Bridge Wars and hosted the celebrity-focused Aussie Osbourne Show. A published author, his work extends into feature writing and screenplay development. He is currently completing his next book, a thriller novel titled Hate (working title).

== 2003–2004: Career beginnings ==
Bruce started his career while attending Kingston College in Niagara Falls, Ontario, Canada. While in attendance there a neighbour broke a gas line. The school was evacuated and it was at this point that Bruce met a production manager who introduced him to the film Home Beyond the Sun (which is a film directed and produced by Academy Award winner Colin Chilvers).

== 2007–2010 ==
In early 2007, desiring to return to film, Bruce walked into the office of Byron M. Jones, a managing partner for Pure Flix. Jones also owned a company that managed talent, and became the publicist and booking agent to the "Million Dollar Man" Ted DiBiase of World Wrestling Entertainment, a position he held until late 2010.

During his time at Pure Flix, Bruce acted as a script revisionist for the Eric Roberts film In the Blink of an Eye and doing back end work for their streaming and DVD store, as well as helping to promote films.

Bruce has also worked as publicist to athletes such as NFL player Shawn Harper and author Bill Bean of Discovery Channel.

== 2010–present ==
Bruce served as the executive producer for the 2011 album "Bridge Wars" which features artists such as F.E.R.N (produced by DukeDaGod of The Diplomats), Mahogany Jones (four-time Champion of BET’s "Freestyle Friday's" battle competitions) and Brookyln’s own L.G. Wise.

In 2014, Bruce appeared as gang leader Mario "KingPin" Harris in the film Lost Penny; a film that starred Rachael McOwen of The Amazing Spider-Man 2 and won at the Manhattan Film Festival

In 2016, Bruce worked as host and executive producer on The Aussie Osbourne Show where he talked with people including Mike Mullane, Alveda King, Charlene Li, Kyle Mills, Gayle Lynds, and Lisa See.

In 2022, Bruce wrote the intro to the 150th Anniversary Edition of Demons by Fyodor Dostoevsky.

Appearing on Mark Leslie's podcast in August 2025, he announced that he was working on a new novel titled Hate. Bruce described the inspiration behind Hate was really him trying to come to terms with the loss of Chris Cornell, Chester Bennington, and Dolores O'Riordan Going on to tell Lazie Indie Magazine, "Hate was my way of processing the void they left behind."

== Filmography ==
- 2014: Lost Penny
- 2013: The Legend of Jimi Lazer
- 2009: In the Blink of an Eye
- 2004: Home Beyond the Sun

== Bibliography ==
- Penholder (Queensbridge Publishing) ISBN 978-0-9813183-1-8
- The Calling (Polar Expressions Publishing) ISBN 978-1-926925-05-9
- Fire And Light (Poetry Institute of Canada) ISBN 978-1-926774-11-4
