= Pinnacle Peak Pictures =

American film production and distribution company

- Type: Private
- Industry: Entertainment
- Genre: Religious
- Founded: November 21, 2005; 20 years ago
- Founders: David A. R. White; Russell Wolfe
- Headquarters: Scottsdale, Arizona, U.S.
- Key people: David A. R. White; Michael Scott (CEO)
- Products: Christian films
- Services: Educational curriculum
- Revenue: $27.4 million (2018 box office receipts)
- Website: pinnaclepeakpictures.com

Pinnacle Peak Pictures (formerly Pure Flix Entertainment until January 2021) is an American independent evangelical Christian film production and distribution studio founded by David A. R. White and Russell Wolfe. Pinnacle Peak produces Christian films, including God's Not Dead (2014), Do You Believe? (2015), Woodlawn (2015), The Case for Christ (2017), and Unplanned (2019). Since 2014, films produced and distributed by Pure Flix have collectively grossed over $195 million at the worldwide box office. The company has headquarters in Scottsdale, Arizona.

== History ==
Pinnacle Peak was founded in 2005 by David A. R. White, Michael Scott, Russell Wolfe, Randy Travis, Byron M. Jones and Elizabeth Travis as Pure Flix Entertainment.

Since its foundation, the company has created many films, such as The Wager, Home Beyond the Sun, In the Blink of an Eye, Sarah's Choice, A Greater Yes: The Story of Amy Newhouse, The Book of Ruth: Journey of Faith, Holyman Undercover, and Samson.

The company produced Jerusalem Countdown in 2011, with 10 West Studios. They also produced the first two seasons of TBN's Travel the Road. God's Not Dead (2014) starring Kevin Sorbo, Shane Harper, and Dean Cain earned over $60 million in the U.S. box office and was released in digital format by Lionsgate on August 5, 2014.

In November 2015, Pure Flix established an in-house distribution arm, hiring former Regal executive Ken Rather as head. The studio planned for God's Not Dead 2 to be its first self-distributed film. Also in 2015, Pure Flix launched a subscription streaming service of the same name, which would be devoted to Christian and family-friendly films and television series. In 2016, Pure Flix launched "Keep the Faith", a curriculum supplement for homeschooling.

Pure Flix partnered with the National Hispanic Christian Leadership Conference to supply further opportunities for Hispanic actors to improve the media representation of the Hispanic community. In 2016, Pure Flix reached a multi-year home media distribution deal with Universal Pictures Home Entertainment, starting with Woodlawn.

On November 12, 2020, Pure Flix announced that it would sell its eponymous streaming service to Sony Pictures Entertainment (via its Affirm Films subsidiary); financial details were not disclosed. The acquisition included rights to the "Pure Flix" brand, thus the studio was rebranded as Pinnacle Peak Pictures in January 2021.

=== God's Not Dead series ===
Their film God's Not Dead was 2014's highest-grossing independent film and one of the most successful independent faith-based films of all time despite negative criticism. A second film, God's Not Dead 2 grossed over $1.4 million in Brazil and was considered by Vox to be "moderately commercially successful". A third film, titled God's Not Dead: A Light in Darkness, was released on March 30, 2018. A fourth film, God's Not Dead: We the People, was released in October 2021. The Christian band Newsboys appear in and provide music for the first two films in the series. Legalities related to the Johnson Amendment were referenced in the second film.

== Awards and nominations ==
Year	Nominated work	Award	Result
2014	God's Not Dead	Inspirational Film of the Year – GMA Dove Awards	Won

== Productions and distributions ==
=== Film ===
Release date	Title	Notes
2004	Home Beyond the Sun	
2007	The Wager	
2008	The Imposter	
2009	A Greater Yes: The Story of Amy Newhouse	
2009	Sarah's Choice	
2009	In the Blink of an Eye	
2009	The Book of Ruth: Journey of Faith	
2010	Holyman Undercover	
2010	What If...	
2010	The Bill Collector	
2011	The Encounter	
2011	Jerusalem Countdown	
2012	Ghost Soldiers	
2012	Apostle Peter and the Last Supper	
2012	The Mark	
2013	The Book of Esther	
2013	The Book of Daniel	
2014	God's Not Dead	
2014	Moms' Night Out	Produced by TriStar Pictures, Affirm Films, Provident Films, and Four Boys Entertainment
2015	Old Fashioned	
2015	Do You Believe?	
2015	Faith of Our Fathers	
2015	Woodlawn	
2016	God's Not Dead 2	
2016	Hillsong: Let Hope Rise	
2016	I'm Not Ashamed	Produced by Big Film Factory and Visible Pictures
2017	The Case for Christ	
2017	Same Kind of Different as Me	Distribution only Produced by Disruption Entertainment and Paramount Pictures
2018	Samson	Produced by Boomtown Films
2018	God's Not Dead: A Light in Darkness	
2018	Unbroken: Path to Redemption	Produced by Universal 1440 Entertainment and The WTA Group
2018	Shake Off the World	
2018	Little Women	Produced by Paulist Productions and Main Dog Productions
2018	Indivisible	
2019	Unplanned	
2021	God's Not Dead: We the People	
2022	Redeeming Love	Produced by Universal Pictures, Nitibah Pictures, and Mission Pictures International
2024	God's Not Dead: In God We Trust	
2025	The Last Supper	

=== Television ===
- Travel the Road (2003–present)

== Subsidiaries ==
Pinnacle Peak owns a subsidiary known as Quality Flix. Quality Flix works with international films, in contrast to Pinnacle Peak, which is primarily focused on distribution of films within the United States.

== Controversies ==
In 2019, Pure Flix's anti-abortion film Unplanned attracted controversy in both mainstream and evangelical media. Some Christian commentators perceived the film as being unfairly censored after it received an R rating from the Motion Picture Association of America and following a brief and subsequently rescinded suspension of the film's Twitter account. Michael Gryboski, writing for Christian Post, criticized major Canadian film distributors (such as Cineplex) refusal to screen the film in the country, calling it a "de facto ban". Film critic Normal Wilner countered that statement by accusing the distributors of employing disingenuous tactics to "manufacture a controversy", pointing out that the film was eventually shown in about 25 Cineplex and Landmark theaters in Canada and claiming nothing had prevented an earlier release. In turn, he pointed out Pure Flix's decision of deliberately choosing not to screen Unplanned for critics to avoid negative reviews. After its release, some criticized Unplanned for 'dangerous' inaccuracies.

Despite Pure Flix films generally being well-received by its evangelical Christian viewership, the company has also attracted criticism from several Christian commentators. Film critic Alissa Wilkinson, who wrote for Christianity Today and teaches at the Christian King's College in New York City, criticized Pure Flix films for being intellectually unstimulating and reinforcing their audience's prejudices "instead of exercising and challenging the imagination of their audience in ways that would make their audience better Christians". She also criticized the studio's successful God's Not Dead trilogy for being "far more interested in bolstering a certain sort of persecution complex than in encouraging its audience toward Christlike behavior". Justin Chang, another film critic who identifies as Christian, likewise criticized Pure Flix's brand of faith-based films for what he perceived as their "self-victimizing" depiction of the evangelical Christian community. Kayla Bartsch, writing for National Review, argued that Pure Flix's films "work to confirm the hypothesis that American Christianity must be artless and unrefined", making a case for more nuanced and stimulating religious films.
