= Love Finds You in Sugarcreek, Ohio =

Love Finds You in Sugarcreek, Ohio may refer to:

- Love Finds You in Sugarcreek, Ohio (novel), a 2010 novel by Serena B. Miller
- Love Finds You in Sugarcreek, Ohio (film), a 2014 film, based on the novel
