= Bruce Marchiano =

American actor and author (born 1956)

Bruce Joseph Marchiano
- Born: February 5, 1956 (age 70); Los Angeles, California, USA
- Occupation: Actor
- Years active: 1984–present

Bruce Marchiano (born February 5, 1956) is an American actor and author best known for his portrayals of Jesus Christ in the Visual Bible film series.

== Early life ==
Marchiano was born in Los Angeles, California on February 5, 1956. His father is of Italian descent and his mother is of Syrian descent and he has one brother. He attended Catholic schools until graduating from Servite High School in Anaheim, California in 1973. A Dustin Hoffman film he saw in theaters when he was young inspired him to be an actor and he acted throughout high school.

Marchiano earned his B.A. in economics from California State University, Fullerton and a J.D. degree from Western State University. He passed the State Bar of California in 1980 but only actively practiced law in 2019.

== Career ==
=== Acting career ===
Marchiano's first role was a 1985 episode of Murder, She Wrote, which was followed by appearances in LA Law, Columbo, and the low-budget horror film, Curse II: The Bite.

As of 2021, he has played Jesus in at least ten films; Higher Level Agency claims he has appeared as Jesus in more movies than any other actor. In the 2009 film Road to Emmaus, he portrayed Jesus' mysterious post-resurrection appearance to two disciples as described in the Gospel of Luke. He also voiced an animated Jesus in the children's animation Lion of Judah. In 2012, Marchiano portrayed Jesus in Apostle Peter and the Last Supper, a film about St. Peter recalling his early days as he prepares for his martyrdom in Rome. In 2014 he appeared as Jesus in The Week that Changed the World.

=== Writing career ===
Marchiano has written four books, mostly about his experiences portraying Jesus:

- In the Footsteps of Jesus: One Man’s Journey (1997), Harvest House
- Jesus, the Man Who Loved Women: He Treasures, Esteems, and Delights in You (2008), Howard Books
- The Character of a Man: Reflecting the Image of Jesus (2010), Howard Books
- Jesus Wept (2012), Howard Books

He also wrote, directed, and appeared in the pro-life film Alison's Choice

== Marchiano Ministries ==
Marchiano runs Marchiano Ministries, a non-profit ministry based out of North Hollywood, California that goes on missionary trips to South Africa. He has given talks at schools and churches since 1993.

== Personal life ==
Marchiano grew up in the Catholic Church but became a Protestant in 1989. He and his wife Maria have two children, Shane and Brooke.

== Filmography ==
=== Films ===
Year	Title	Role	Notes
1987	The Three Kings	Father at Church	
1989	Curse II: The Bite	Deputy Barney	
1993	The Visual Bible: Matthew	Jesus	
1994	The Visual Bible: Acts	Jesus	Uncredited
2001	Final Solution	Jake	
2002	Jesus the Christ	Jesus	
2006	Faith Happens	Peter	
2010	The Encounter	Jesus	
2011	The Lion of Judah	Jesus (voice)	
2012	The Encounter: Paradise Lost	Jesus	
2012	Apostle Peter and the Last Supper	Jesus	
2013	Revelation Road: The Beginning of the End	The Stranger	
2013	This is Our Time	Professor Callahan	
2013	For Love's Sake	Dr. Clement Lloyd	
2013	Revelation Road 2: The Sea of Glass and Fire	The Stranger	
2013	Come Follow Me	Jesus	
2014	Revelation Road: The Black Rider	The Stranger	
2015	Alison's Choice	The Janitor/Jesus	Writer, director, producer
2015	My Son, My Savior	Jesus	
2018	Grace and Gravity	John Palmer	
2019	Overcomer	Pastor Mark	
2020	The Author, the Star, and the Keeper	Author	
2023	Stand in the Gap	Author	

=== Television ===
Year	Title	Role	Notes
1985	Murder, She Wrote	Assistant Director	Episode: "Murder to a Jazz Beat"
1987	The New Mike Hammer	Gerald	Episode: "Green Blizzard"
1989	Hardball		Episode: "The Silver Scream"
1989	Freddy's Nightmares	Rick	Episode: "Dream Come True"
1989	Days of Our Lives	Scofini	3 episodes
1989	L.A. Law	Catcher	Episode: "The Unsterile Cuckoo"
1990	Generations	Starvos	3 episodes
1991	Columbo	2nd Technician	Episode: "Columbo and the Murder of a Rock Star"
1995	Models Inc.	Minister	Episode: "Sometimes a Great Commotion"
2001	Legend of the Candy Cane	John Sonneman (voice)	TV Movie
2010	Road to Emmaus	Jesus	TV Movie
2011	The Heart of Christmas	Dr. McDowell	TV Movie
2016-2020	The Encounter	Jesus, Victor, The Man	14 episodes
2021	Banking on Christmas	Bob West	TV Movie
