= Russell Wolfe =

American film producer

- Born: November 18. 1964; United States
- Died: May 27, 2015 (aged 50); Scottsdale, Arizona, U.S.
- Occupations: Actor, film producer
- Spouse: Alysoun Wolfe
- Children: 2

Russell Wolfe (November 18, 1964 – May 27, 2015) was an American actor and film producer who co-founded the Christian film production company, Pure Flix Entertainment with David A. R. White.

== Personal life ==
Wolfe was married to Alysoun Wolfe and they had two children. In December 2013, Wolfe was diagnosed with ALS.

== Death ==
On May 27, 2015, Wolfe died of ALS at the age of 50 in Scottsdale, Arizona.

== Select filmography ==
=== Actor ===
- The Wager (2007)
- Sarah's Choice (2009)
- In the Blink of an Eye (2009; also screenwriter)
- What If... (2010)
- Holyman Undercover (2010)
- Apostle Peter and the Last Supper (2012)
- The Book of Esther (2013)
- The Book of Daniel (2013)
- God's Not Dead (2014)

=== Producer ===
- The Wager (2007)
- Sarah's Choice (2009)
- In the Blink of an Eye (2009)
- What If... (2010)
- The Encounter (2011)
- Apostle Peter and the Last Supper (2012)
- The Mark (2012)
- The Book of Esther (2013)
- The Book of Daniel (2013)
- God's Not Dead (2014)
- Moms' Night Out (2014)
- Do You Believe? (2015)
- Dancer and the Dame (2015)
- God's Not Dead 2 (2016)
