= Sarah's Choice =

2009 American drama film

- Theatrical poster
- Directed by: Chad Kapper
- Written by: Sean Paul Murphy; Timothy Ratajczak
- Produced by: David A.R. White; Byron Jones; Michael Scott; Russell Wolfe; J.E. Smith
- Starring: Rebecca St. James; Andrea Logan White; Dick Van Patten; Brad Stine
- Cinematography: Virgil L. Harper
- Edited by: Sean Paul Murphy
- Music by: James Robert Ballard
- Production company: Pure Flix Entertainment
- Distributed by: EMI CMG Distribution
- Release date: November 1, 2009
- Running time: 90 minutes
- Country: United States
- Language: English
- Budget: $900,000

Sarah's Choice is a 2009 American direct-to-video Christian drama film directed by Chad Kapper. The film was the first lead film role for contemporary Christian singer-songwriter Rebecca St. James as the title character, who starred alongside Andrea Logan White and Dick Van Patten. Christian comedian Brad Stine also appears in the film, along with Charlene Tilton and Staci Keanan. It was released to DVD on November 1, 2009, and was aired on February 27, 2010, on the Trinity Broadcasting Network.

== Plot ==
Sarah Collins's co-worker gets pregnant, which means Sarah could get a promotion. Meanwhile, her boyfriend Matt is pulling pranks. Sarah then finds out she herself is pregnant. At the doctor's office, a lady gives her a card and tells her the Lord will give her three visions. Megan reveals her story about her abortion. Sarah is considering an abortion. Before she makes her final decision, her visions cause her to think about her future.

== Cast ==
- Rebecca St. James as Sarah Collins
- Andrea Logan White as Megan
- Dick Van Patten as Pastor Smith
- Brad Stine as Clay
- Staci Keanan as Denise
- Robert Miano as Henry
- Charlene Tilton as Michelle Biden
- Ethan Cooper Roy as Jack
- Julian Bailey as Matt Evans
- Sidney Mason Gunn as Jill
- Sean McGowan as Chad
- Matthew Bacis as Michael
- Linda Bisesti as Agnes Collins
- Marc Davies as Bob
- Judy Lewis as Older Sarah
- Carey Scott as Justin
- Sean Sedgwick as Thad
- Libby Smallbone as Daisy
- Yvette Tucker as Jennifer

== Production ==
Principal filming was completed in Ohio at the end of February 2009. When speaking of her role in the film, Rebecca St. James said, "Obviously, everyone wants a redemptive story, but the truth is that 43 percent of childbearing-age women today have abortions; it's much higher than what most people think." St. James wrote the song, "Little One", for the film.

== Release ==
Sarah's Choice was released to DVD on November 1, 2009, and DVD release was followed by a theatrical premiere at Warner Brothers Studios in Hollywood. The DVD contains bonus features "The Making Of", "Trailers", and "Commentary", and is available from EMI CMG Distribution. It was shown at the Projecting Hope Film Festival at Waterworks Cinemas near Fox Chapel, Pennsylvania.

=== Reception ===
Megan Basham of World magazine said, "Newcomer Rebecca St. James turns in a subtle and affecting performance as Sarah... Unfortunately that promising beginning is squandered when the story slides into the trap of over-simplifying and oversentimentalizing that characterizes so many Christian films." Jesusfreakhideout gave the film four out of five stars and mentioned it was one of the best Christian films to date. CBN noted the film's storyline of lead character Sarah Collins by stating the film "portrays all the believable influences for abortion through her co-workers, pro-abortion medical clinic, and her personal motives to stay on the career track". They noted the film's "pro-life message", and that the filmmakers approached the topic without use of graphic representations, "making it suitable for family viewing, as well as, for church groups". The noted that Rebecca St James wrote and sang the song "Little One", which was used as background music at the end of the film, and praised St. James' for "infusing her character with the passion she portrays in music".

== Book ==
A novel (ISBN 1401689248) based on the film was released on May 27, 2014, and authored by Rebecca St. James and Nancy Rue.
