= Bells of Innocence =

2003 film

- Official DVD cover
- Directed by: Alin Bijan
- Written by: Chris Bessey; Mike Norris
- Produced by: Alin Bijan
- Starring: Mike Norris; Marshall R. Teague; Chuck Norris; David A. R. White
- Cinematography: Hamid Shams
- Music by: Amin Emam
- Release date: April 6, 2003
- Running time: 110 minutes
- Country: United States
- Budget: $3,500,000

Bells of Innocence is a 2003 American Christian film directed by Alin Bijan and written by Chris Bessey. It stars son-father actors Mike and Chuck Norris, David A. R. White, Marshall R. Teague, and Chuck's real-life granddaughter Gabby Di Ciolli (Mike's niece, who uses her father's last name) as "Lyric". It was released on April 6, 2003 in the United States.

== Plot ==
Jux Jonas (Mike Norris) is a man whose faith in God is precarious. His daughter was hit and killed by a car, and he has spent the last few years "tearing through life", not wanting to face the pain and return to his faith. Reluctantly, he journeys with friends Conrad (David A. R. White) and Oren (Carey Scott) aboard a plane to Mexico, to hand out Bibles as a form of ministry. However, their small aircraft soon crashes, and the trio find themselves in the secluded wasteland of Ceres, a town where the citizens are pale and eerie, and visitors are seen as unwanted outsiders.

Before long, Jux and his pals discover something very weird in this place: No communication to the outside world seems to exist until local rancher Matthew (Chuck Norris) offers him the use of his two-way radio. The town at large despises Matthew and what he stands for. It is soon revealed that town elder Joshua (Marshall R. Teague) is actually an agent of Satan who has controlled the children of Ceres for centuries to bring about an unholy war. God has sent Matthew to observe, protect, and lead broken believers like Jux back to their faith in Jesus Christ. As the forces of evil prepare for a spiritual Armageddon, using the town's children as terrifying hosts, even Matthew cannot interfere alone, and Jux, Conrad and Oren must choose which side they will stand with for all eternity.

== Cast ==
- Mike Norris as Jux Jonas
- Chuck Norris as Matthew
- Carey Scott as Oren Ames
- David A.R. White as Conrad Champlain
- Marshall R. Teague as Joshua Ravel
- Scarlett McAlister as Dianna
- Grant James as Emeritus

== See also ==
- List of American films of 2003
- Chuck Norris filmography
