= Serena B. Miller =

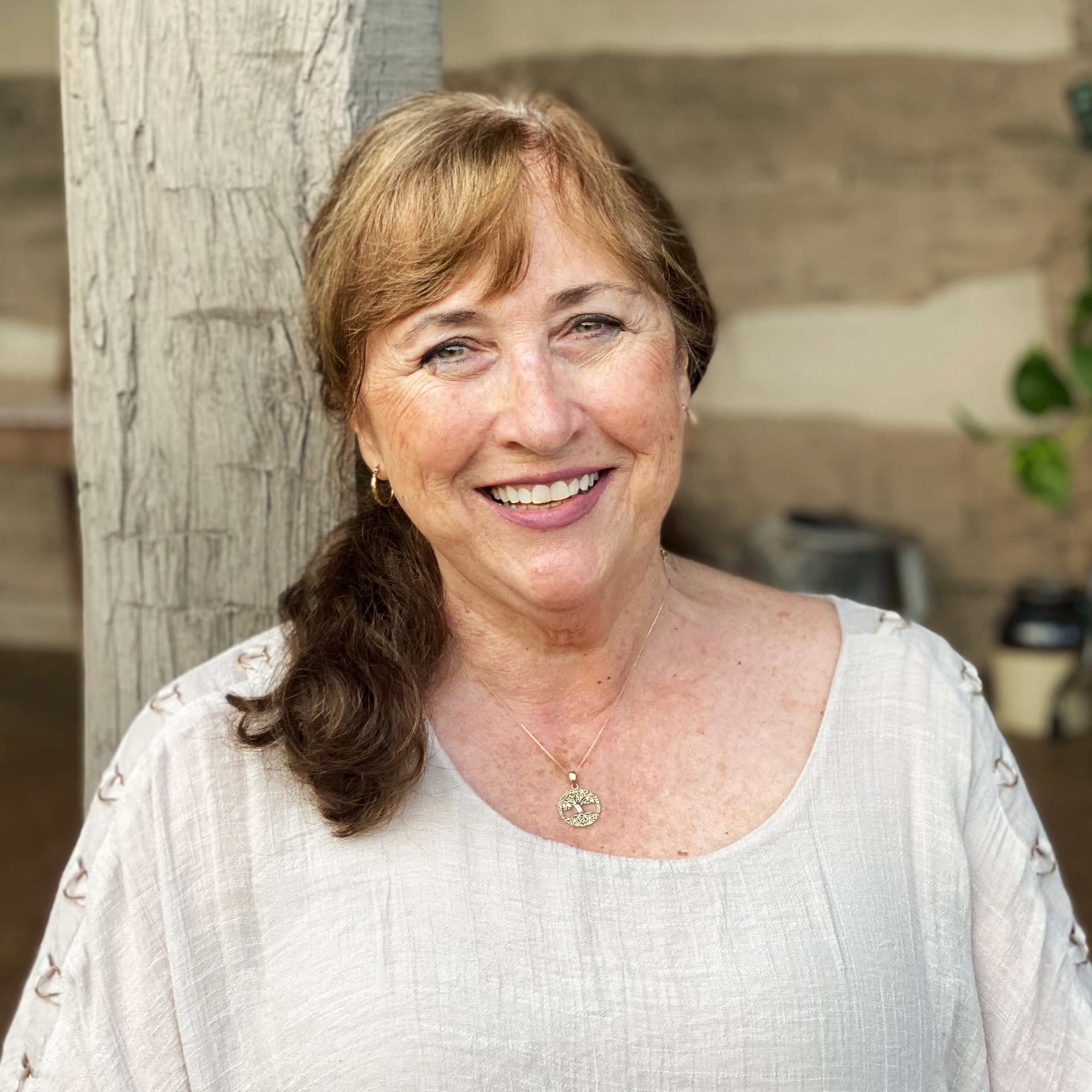
- Born: January 20, 1950 (age 76); Portsmouth, Ohio, U.S.
- Education: Ohio Valley College
- Occupation: Novelist
- Writing career
- Genres: Amish Romance, Historical Fiction, Inspirational Fiction, Cozy Mystery
- Website: serenabmiller.com

Serena B. Miller (born January 20, 1950) is an American author of inspirational fiction, historical fiction, Amish romance, and cozy mysteries.

== Early life and education ==
Miller was born in Portsmouth, Ohio and grew up in southern Ohio. Much of her childhood was spent in an 1840s log house originally belonging to her great-grandfather. She attended Ohio Valley Christian College in Parkersburg, West Virginia.

== Writing career ==
Miller began to seriously pursue a writing career in her late forties after her sons were grown. She was first published in various periodicals including The Detroit Free Press Magazine, Billy Graham's Decision Magazine, Guideposts, Focus On The Family, Christian Woman, Woman's World, and Reader's Digest. After joining Romance Writers of America in 2001, she began submitting full-length inspirational novels to various publishers.

Her fascination with an Old Order Amish settlement that had recently moved into southern Ohio near her home resulted in Love Finds You in Sugarcreek, Ohio (2010). Closely following were three more Amish novels: An Uncommon Grace (2012), Hidden Mercies (2013), and Fearless Hope (2014). Her interest in the post-civil war lumbering era in Michigan inspired a historical series beginning with The Measure of Katie Calloway (2011) followed by A Promise to Love (2012) and Under A Blackberry Moon (2013).

In addition to her fiction, Miller has authored several non-fiction works drawing from her extensive research into Amish communities. These include An Amish Wedding Invitation (2013), Inside an Amish Schoolhouse (2017), and her comprehensive parenting guide More than Happy: The Wisdom of Amish Parenting (2015). These works demonstrate her authority on Amish culture and traditions beyond her fictional portrayals.

Miller has achieved USA Today bestselling author status with her blend of inspirational fiction and compelling storytelling. She established herself as primarily a series writer with several multi-book collections. Her largest series, The Doreen Sizemore Adventures, consists of eleven books beginning with Murder on the Texas Eagle: A Doreen Sizemore Adventure (2013). She returned to the Sugarcreek setting with the five-book Love's Journey in Sugarcreek series, further exploring the Amish community that launched her career. Her Love's Journey on Manitoulin Island series, comprising four books including Moriah's Lighthouse (2017), expanded her geographical scope beyond Ohio. Additional series include Uncommon Grace (3 books) and Secrets of Sugarcreek (2 books).

Miller's work has garnered significant recognition within the Christian and inspirational fiction community. Her novel The Measure Of Katie Calloway won the prestigious RITA Award from Romance Writers of America in 2012. An Uncommon Grace was nominated as a finalist for the 2013 Carol Awards. Her novel Under a Blackberry Moon was a finalist in the 2013 Christy Awards, and A Promise to Love won the Carol Award in 2013 from the American Christian Fiction Writers Association.

Three of Miller's novels have been adapted into television movies. Love Finds You in Sugarcreek, Ohio was adapted as a television movie for UP TV and aired in 2014. It was filmed on location in Sugarcreek, Ohio, and won the Movieguide Epiphany Prize for Most Inspiring TV or Streaming Movie or Program in 2015. An Uncommon Grace was adapted by the Hallmark Movies & Mysteries Channel in 2017, with filming taking place in Kentucky. Moriah's Lighthouse was adapted by the Hallmark Channel in 2022, filmed on location in France, including the Ploumanac'h Lighthouse in Perros-Guirec.

Miller has maintained a consistent publishing schedule throughout her career, with particularly productive periods in 2013, 2017, and 2025. Her most recent works include five new titles published in 2025, demonstrating her continued literary productivity and reader appeal after fifteen years in the industry.

== Personal life ==
After several years working as a court reporter in Detroit, Michigan, she and her family moved back to their hometown of Minford, Ohio, where her husband, Steve Miller, became the minister of the Sunshine Church of Christ. He died in 2016 after a lengthy illness. Always her greatest encourager, he made her promise that she would continue writing after he was gone. Because of the brain fog of grief, for many months, she found it impossible to keep that promise. Her youngest son, Jacob, suggested she attempt to rewrite one of her earliest manuscripts, which had been rejected by multiple publishers.

One thing her husband had emphasized during the years she wrote and dealt with rejection was, “God doesn’t expect you to be successful, Serena. He only asks you to be faithful. Just do the work.”

With those words in mind, she rewrote the rejected manuscript, while her son taught himself all aspects of publishing. Soon, the family business of L.J. Emory Publishing was established, which has published all her titles since. The rights to the resulting novel, Moriah’s Lighthouse, was later purchased by Hallmark, and filmed at Ploumanac'h Lighthouse in Perros-Guirec, Hotel Castel Beau Site in Brittany, and Rochefort-en-Terre, France.

== Bibliography ==
=== Stand-Alone Publications ===
Order of Release	Title	Published	Page Count	Series Title	No. in Series	Notes
1.	Love Finds You in Sugarcreek, Ohio	Jul 2010	320			Love Finds You in Sugarcreek, Ohio has been turned into a made-for-TV movie which aired in 2014 on UP TV and then won the Movieguide Epiphany Prize for Most Inspiring TV or Streaming Movie or Program in 2015.
5.	An Amish Wedding Invitation; An eShort Account of a Real Amish Wedding	Feb 2013				Based on a real Amish Wedding in Tuscarawas County, Ohio attended by the author.
12.	A Way of Escape	Dec 2014	312			
13.	More than Happy: The Wisdom of Amish Parenting	Feb 2015	336			Non-Fiction Amish parenting book co-authored with Mennonite author, Paul Stutzman, using personal interviews with Old Order Amish, New Order Amish, and Swartzentruber Amish
18.	Inside an Amish Schoolhouse: A Personal Account of an Amish Christmas Play	Mar 2017				Base on a real Amish School play in Jackson County, Ohio attended by the author

=== Amish Inspirational Romance ===
Love's Journey in Sugarcreek (Amish Inspirational Romance)
Order of Release	Title	Published	Page Count	Series Title	No. in Series	Notes
16.	The Sugar Haus Inn	Mar 2016	346	Love's Journey in Sugarcreek	1	A republication of the original Love Finds You in Sugarcreek, Ohio (novel) establishing a new series under the trademarked series, "Love's Journey"
17.	Rachel's Rescue	Feb 2017	344	Love's Journey in Sugarcreek	2	
22.	Love Rekindled	Jul 2018	314	Love's Journey in Sugarcreek	3	
24.	Bertha's Resolve	Sep 2020	314	Love's Journey in Sugarcreek	4	
28.	The Heart of Sugarcreek	May 2024	370	Love's Journey in Sugarcreek	5	The Heart of Sugarcreek won the Carol Award for Romance in 2025, which is given by the American Christian Fiction Writers association.

The Uncommon Grace Series (Amish Inspirational Romance)
Order of Release	Title	Published	Page Count	Series Title	No. in Series	Notes
3.	An Uncommon Grace	Apr 2012	352	Uncommon Grace	1	An Uncommon Grace was a finalist in the 2013 Carol Awards and in 2017, was turned into a TV Movie for the Hallmark Movies & Mysteries Channel
6.	Hidden Mercies	Apr 2013	368	Uncommon Grace	2	
11.	Fearless Hope	Apr 2014	352	Uncommon Grace	3	

=== Historical Inspirational Romance ===
Michigan Northwoods Dreams (Historical Inspirational Romance)
Order of Release	Title	Published	Page Count	Series Title	No. in Series	Notes
2.	The Measure of Katie Calloway	Oct 2011	320	Northwoods Dreams	1	The Measure Of Katie Calloway won the prestigious RITA Award given by Romance Writers of America in 2012.
4.	A Promise to Love	Oct 2012	336	Northwoods Dreams	3	A Promise to Love won the Carol Award in 2013, which is given by the American Christian Fiction Writers association.
9.	Under a Blackberry Moon	Oct 2013	352	Northwoods Dreams	2	Under a Blackberry Moon was a Finalist in the 2013 Christy Award for Historical Romance

Love's Journey on Manitoulin Island (Historical Inspirational Romance)
Order of Release	Title	Published	Page Count	Series Title	No. in Series	Notes
19.	Moriah's Lighthouse	Aug 2017	170	Love's Journey on Manitoulin Island	1	In 2022, Moriah's Lighthouse was turned into a TV Movie for the Hallmark Channel
20.	Moriah's Fortress	Sep 2017	186	Love's Journey on Manitoulin Island	2	
21.	Moriah's Stronghold	Nov 2017	196	Love's Journey on Manitoulin Island	3	
23.	Eliza's Lighthouse	Oct 2018	190	Love's Journey on Manitoulin Island	4	

=== Cozy Mystery ===
The Doreen Sizemore Adventures (Cozy Mystery)
Order of Release	Title	Published	Page Count	Series Title	No. in Series	Notes
7.	Murder on the Texas Eagle	May 2013		Doreen Sizemore Adventures	1	
8.	Murder at the Buckstaff Bathhouse	Jun 2013		Doreen Sizemore Adventures	2	
10.	Murder at Slippery Slope Youth Camp	Jan 2014		Doreen Sizemore Adventures	3	
14.	Murder on the Mississippi Queen	Mar 2015		Doreen Sizemore Adventures	4	
15.	Murder at the Mystery Mansion	Aug 2015		Doreen Sizemore Adventures	5	
25.	Murder in Las Vegas	Apr 2021		Doreen Sizemore Adventures	6	
26.	Mystery at Little Faith Community Church	Jun 2021		Doreen Sizemore Adventures	7	
27.	Mystery at Alcatraz	Feb 2022		Doreen Sizemore Adventures	8	
30.	Murder in New York	Feb 2025		Doreen Sizemore Adventures	9	
31.	Murder in Egypt	Feb 2025		Doreen Sizemore Adventures	10	
32.	Murder in Sugarcreek	Mar 2025		Doreen Sizemore Adventures	11	

Secrets of Sugarcreek (Amish Inspirational Cozy Mystery)
Order of Release	Title	Published	Page Count	Series Title	No. in Series	Notes
29.	A Stranger for Christmas	Feb 2025	200	Secrets of Sugarcreek	1	
33.	Searching for Samuel	May 2025		Secrets of Sugarcreek	2	
34.	The Quiet Soldier	Nov 2025		Secrets of Sugarcreek	3	

== Filmography ==
Novel Adapted	Year of Adaptation	Category	Channel	Filming Locations
Love Finds You in Sugarcreek, Ohio	2013	TV movie	Up TV	Filmed on location in Sugarcreek, Ohio and won the Movieguide Epiphany Prize for Most Inspiring TV or Streaming Movie or Program
An Uncommon Grace	2017	TV movie	Hallmark Mystery	Filmed on location in Glasgow, Cave City, and Horse Cave, Kentucky
Moriah's Lighthouse	2022	TV movie	Hallmark Channel	Filmed on location in Ploumanac'h Lighthouse in Perros-Guirec, Hotel Castel Beau Site in Brittany, and Rochefort-en-Terre, France
