= Old Fashioned (film) =

2014 film by Rik Swartzwelder

- Theatrical release poster
- Directed by: Rik Swartzwelder
- Written by: Rik Swartzwelder
- Story by: Rik Swartzwelder
- Produced by: Nathan Nazario; Dave DeBorde; Nini Hadjis; Rik Swartzwelder; William K Baker; Stephen Campanella
- Starring: Elizabeth Ann Roberts; Rik Swartzwelder; LeJon Woods; Nini Hadjis; Ange'le Perez; Joseph Bonamico; Maryann Nagel; Lindsay Heath; Anne Marie Nestor; Tyler Hollinger; Dorothy Silver
- Cinematography: David George
- Edited by: Jonathan Olive; Phillip Sherwood; Robin Katz
- Music by: Kazimir Boyle
- Production companies: Skoche Films; Motion Picture Pro Studios
- Distributed by: Freestyle Releasing; Pure Flix
- Release dates: September 18, 2014 (Temecula Valley); February 6, 2015
- Running time: 115 minutes
- Country: United States
- Language: English
- Budget: $600,000
- Box office: $1.9 million

Old Fashioned is a 2014 American Christian-themed romance film written and directed by Rik Swartzwelder, who also stars opposite Elizabeth Ann Roberts. The film had a limited release in just three markets on February 6, 2015, with its major release over the Valentine's weekend that followed (on 224 screens). The film received negative reviews and grossed $1.9 million on a $600,000 budget.

== Plot ==
Clay Walsh owns an antique shop in a small Midwestern college town where he repairs and restores furniture, and where he meets Amber, a free-spirited young woman who rents the apartment above Clay's shop. Amber is struck by the fact that Clay will not enter the apartment to show her around. He tells her he has made a vow not be alone with a woman who is not his wife. Amber finds this odd, and odder still when she learns he is not married.

Though initially disturbed by Clay's revelation, Amber takes a job at a local shop, and takes an interest in getting to know Clay. This proves to be difficult, as Clay does not want to date. He believes dating is a poor preparation for marriage, and a waste of time. He refuses to see Amber in any way unless something in her apartment needs repair. In response, Amber begins sabotaging appliances so she can speak with Clay, which annoys him.

Eventually, an exasperated Clay agrees to take her out, but the dates he plans are odd and unusual. Amber discloses her past of being in a number of relationships, many of which were superficial and at times abusive, leading her to move to a new town each time. Clay's past is even more checkered; in his college days, he knew a large number of women, and shot exploitation films in the manner of Girls Gone Wild, where he is implied to have had sex with them against their will. At some point in the past, when he was caught cheating with another woman by his now ex-girlfriend, Clay came to the sharp realization that his life choices were causing pain to those around him. He turned away from that life style, walked away from the money, withdrew from the world around him, and confined himself to working in the antique shop.

Though isolated, over a period of some nine years he has developed into a craftsman. In town, Clay is known for his faith, his reserve and his odd theories on love and romance. These out of place and old-fashioned attitudes irritate his friends, who have difficulty understanding and accepting him. Few are aware of the guilt Clay feels over his past, or that he views himself as not fit for a relationship with anyone, and some find him creepy and disturbing. It is also revealed that Clay has anger management issues.

Despite the unusual rules Clay has committed himself to, Amber continues to have an interest in him. She expresses a number of times that she wishes they could do things people do on normal dates, but eventually realizes her feelings for Clay are more important than her desire for normality. However, she is left unsettled a few times by how Clay's rules seem to hinder at deeper-rooted issues regarding his personality.

A crisis develops, and both end up going their own way. Amber is left emotionally devastated while watching Clay's exploitation films and discovering his true colors, and Clay becomes mentally unstable by the separation, going around and causing havoc via emotionally outbursts, which almost leads to him getting arrested. He later seeks out his Great Aunt Zella, who implores him not to let her go. She tells Clay that she has never seen anyone try so hard to be good, but that life is not about failings; it is about loving those that God has brought into our lives, and that stepping back into the world, and into love, is vital, knowing that failure is a part of it.

Though initially on the brink of losing his mind, Clay eventually realizes the error of his ways and takes Aunt Zella's advice, finds Amber and asks her to marry him. Before he can even get the question out she answers "Yes." He warns her to be cautious, that it will not be easy. She smiles and repeats her answer "Yes."

== Cast ==
- Elizabeth Ann Roberts as Amber
- Rik Swartzwelder as Clay
- LeJon Woods as David
- Tyler Hollinger as Brad
- Nini Hadjis as Lisa
- Maryann Nagel as Carol
- Lindsay Heath as Trish
- Joseph Bonamico as George
- Dorothy Silver as Great Aunt Zella
- Ange'le Perez as Cosie
- Anne Marie Nestor as Kelly

== Development ==
The script was written by Swartzwelder, who had been working on it for a few years, based on his own original story. In 2007, he partnered with lawyer Gordon Toering (after earlier meeting at a film conference). The two formed a production company (Skoche Films), but financing was delayed by the 2008 financial crisis. Filming finally began in 2011, with additional shooting in 2012. By late 2013, the film was ready for release. Then, in early 2014, when the release date for 50 Shades of Grey was set for Valentine's Day weekend 2015, the decision was made to delay the release of Old Fashioned to coincide with that release.

== Analysis ==
The film depicts a rather unconventional dating method chosen by the protagonist as a means to get away from the cultural norms he has found to be destructive. Clay is quite isolated for a young believer. Having wounded people that he loved, he is riddled with guilt, and has taken the response too far. He does not have Christian friends and does not attend a church. Commented the film's primary creative influence, Rik Swartzwelder: "He has isolated himself from other people, isolated himself ultimately from God even, and it started to change him in a not good way. She starts to press in on him."

Author Karee Santos notes: "In the tender and sometimes rocky romance between the main characters, we see two broken individuals helping to heal each other." In an interview about the film Dr. Juli Slattery remarked: "They both came from a lot of poor choices. It is a story not just of romance, but of God's redemption." Swartzwelder notes: "I wanted to tell a love story that takes the idea of Godly romance seriously. A story that, without apology, explores the possibility of a higher standard in relationships; yet, is also fully aware of just how fragile we all are and doesn't seek to heap guilt upon those of us that have made mistakes."

== Reception ==
=== Critical response ===
On Rotten Tomatoes, the film has an approval rating of 18% based on 22 reviews, with an average rating of 4.2/10. On Metacritic, the film has a rating of 29 out of 100, based on 7 critics, indicating "generally unfavorable reviews". Time magazine's Lily Rothman noted that the film "was a response to what its creators see as a culture that celebrates ideas like those in '50 Shades' but does not seem to create stable romantic relationships." Michael Rechtshaffen of the Los Angeles Times found the film disturbing. Joe Leydon of Variety wrote that "Swartzwelder wants to engage his target audience with a tale of moral redemption through chaste romance. Trouble is, throughout a good portion of his movie, the writer-director gives off a disconcerting Norman Bates vibe". Karee Santos of the Catholic Match Institute wrote: "Amber shows Clay that love doesn't have to be perfect to be worth it, and Clay shows Amber that respect for a woman's body does not equal a lack of passion or a disinterest in love for the long term."

In a 2.5 out of 4 stars review for RogerEbert.com, Glenn Kenny said of the film: "It's incredibly rare to see an American movie with a Christian perspective that's more invested in philosophizing and empathizing than in eschatological pandering, and for that alone Old Fashioned deserves commendation."

=== Box office ===
The film was released over the Valentines' weekend of 2015, opening the same weekend as Universal's Fifty Shades of Grey. The film ended the four-day President's Day holiday weekend with a gross take of $1,083,308. The following week, the film expanded to 298 screens. The movie grossed $1,914,090 during its theatrical run.

The film was released on DVD and Digital on 16 June 2015.

== Music ==
Milan Records released the official motion picture soundtrack on February 10, 2015; it includes both songs by a variety of artists as well as several selections from the original score by Kazimir Boyle. In addition, a second soundtrack (digital only) of previously unreleased original score tracks was released by the composer via iTunes (More Music from the Motion Picture Old Fashioned).

== Novel and official companion book ==
In December 2014, Tyndale House Publishers released both a novelization of the Old Fashioned screenplay (written by Rene Gutteridge) as well as an official companion book for the film and the novel, The Old Fashioned Way: Reclaiming the Lost Art of Romance (written by Ginger Kolbaba).
