= Love Finds You in Sugarcreek, Ohio (film) =

- Title screenshot of promotional release (No theatrical poster as of yet)
- Genre: Family; Amish; Inspirational Romance
- Based on: Love Finds You in Sugarcreek, Ohio (novel) by Serena B. Miller
- Written by: Serena B. Miller
- Screenplay by: Bryar Freed
- Directed by: Terry Cunningham
- Starring: Sarah Lancaster; Tom Everett Scott; Kelly McGillis

Production
- Producers: Cindy Bond; Chevonne O'Shaughnessy; George Shamieh
- Cinematography: Adam N. White
- Editor: Brett Hedlund
- Running time: 91 minutes

Original release
- Network: Up (TV network)
- Release: June 1, 2014

Love Finds You in Sugarcreek, Ohio (titled Stranger In An Amish Town in the UK) is a film adaptation of the novel of the same title by Serena B. Miller. Directed by Terry Cunningham, produced by George Shamieh, distributed by Mission Pictures International, production by Belltower Productions, and funded by Three Point Capital. The production was filmed on location in Holmes County, Ohio with a majority of the filming taking place in Sugarcreek, Ohio during the fall of 2013 which coincided with the time frame set by the Novel. The film first aired on Up (TV network) in June, 2014, with a subsequent release scheduled later internationally and on DVD.

== Plot summary ==
Rachel Troyler (Sarah Lancaster) is a smart, focused, single policewoman in the quaint town of Sugarcreek, nicknamed "The Little Switzerland of Ohio" and located about an hour south of Akron, in the heart of Amish country. She frequently looks in on her three kindly Amish aunts Bertha (Kelly McGillis), Anna (Marianna Alacchi) and Lydia (Annie Kitral), who raised Rachel from girlhood after she was orphaned and are the proprietors of a picturesque, although faded, farmhouse inn. When a mysterious, scruffy stranger, Joe (Tom Everett Scott), shows up on the inn’s doorstep with his five-year-old son, Bobby (Thomas Kapanowski), the aunts insist on taking the pair in as a matter of faith and good will. Rachel’s police instincts immediately tell her that this seemingly broke outsider is much too refined to be the drifter he presents himself to be. So, while the aunts welcome Joe as a handyman and enjoy having a child around the Sugar Haus Inn again, a wary, suspicious – yet attracted – Rachel becomes determined to uncover his identity. Her digging not only reveals his surprising identity, but the fact that he’s run away from his home, his life, and a shocking unsolved murder. Unfortunately, Rachel’s digging doesn’t go unnoticed, which brings Joe’s past – and its violence – right into this quiet Amish community.

== Differences ==
Although the majority of the script stays true to the novel, there are a few differences including some character name changes and the addition or subtraction of some characters.

- Stephanie Anne Fowler (the pregnant teenager from the novel) was not included in the film, and the character was replaced by Elise for the film.
- Dr. Robert Matthias (Joe's estranged father from the novel) was not included in the film.
- Troyer (The family name Troyer was replaced by a less common, for the Sugarcreek area, name Troyler)

== Cast ==
| Actor/Actress | Character | Notes |
|---|---|---|
| Sarah Lancaster | Rachel Troyler | |
| Tom Everett Scott | Joe Matthews | aka Micah Matthias |
| Thomas Kapanowski | Bobby Matthews | aka Bobby Matthias |
| Kelly McGillis | Bertha Troyler | |
| Annie Kitral | Lydia Troyler | |
| Marianna Alacchi | Anna Troyler | |
| Gregory Violand | Police Chief Ed Spencer | |
| John Eby | Fire Chief Sam Phillips | |
| Nicole Baadan | Kim | |
| Geoffrey Hoffman | Dylan Matthias | aka Darren Matthias in the Novel |
| Katherine DeBoer | Chloe Styles | aka Henrietta Stiles in the Novel |
| Chris Van Vliet | Reporter #1 | |
| Jeanne Madison | Reporter #2 | |

== Awards and nominations ==
The show was awarded the Epiphany Prize at the 2015 MovieGuide Awards.
