= A Greater Yes =

A Greater Yes: The Story of Amy Newhouse
- Directed by: Bradley Dorsey
- Written by: Bradley Dorsey; Marshal Yonger
- Produced by: Bradley Dorsey; Clayton Miller
- Starring: Anne Underwood; Bradley Dorsey; Mike Norris
- Cinematography: John Snavely
- Edited by: Bradley Dorsey; Clayton Miller
- Music by: Rob Powers
- Production company: Dorsey Productions
- Distributed by: Pure Flix Entertainment
- Release date: May 28, 2009
- Running time: 84 minutes
- Country: United States
- Language: English
- Budget: $80,000

A Greater Yes: The Story of Amy Newhouse is a 2009 Christian film released on May 28, 2009. The story is about Amy Newhouse, who died of cancer, and the effects of her life and death on her surrounding community. The film was shot entirely on location in Amarillo and Pampa, Texas.

== Background ==
Amy Michelle Newhouse was born in Kerrville, Texas, on September 24, 1982, and moved with her family to Pampa in 1994. She attended Pampa schools and was active in Teen Leadership, Girls for Christ, Business Professionals of America, and Thespian Society; and was manager of the Pampa High School volleyball team. She was active on the drama team with the youth of Trinity Fellowship of Pampa. She planned to attend Christ for the Nation's College in Dallas. She died on September 18, 1999, aged 16, almost aged 17. Newhouse is buried at Citizens Cemetery in Clarendon.

== Plot ==
A Greater Yes: The Story of Amy Newhouse is based on the true story of Texas teenager Amy Newhouse whose battle with cancer did not save her life, but sparked a revival in her community. Amy was a very popular girl at Pampa High School, but she was stricken with cancer. Amy ultimately learns that the "yes" from God is not what she expects, but became instead "a greater yes." Revival breaks out in the area as Amy's faith becomes an example to everyone.

== Cast ==
- Anne Underwood as Amy Newhouse
- Mike Norris as Kevin
- Bradley Dorsey as Tyler
- Bobbie Keith as Nancy Newhouse
- Paul Willis as Jordan
- Kaitlyn Lewis as Katy Newhouse
- Stefany Stern as Sara Newhouse (credited as Stefany Northcutt)
- Julie Griffin as Jessica
- Elayna Roger as Ariel
- Kara Kidd as Patty
- Kathy Rogers as Ariel's Mother
- Carol Howdeshell as Mrs. Collison
- Roger Lindley as Dr. Young
- Clayton Miller as Doctor
- Robert Burchett as Teacher
