= The Corpse Had a Familiar Face =

1994 television film by Joyce Chopra

- Written by: Derek Marlowe; Dennis Turner
- Directed by: Joyce Chopra
- Starring: Elizabeth Montgomery; Dennis Farina; Yaphet Kotto; Audra Lindley
- Composer: Patrick Williams
- Country of origin: United States
- Original language: English

Production
- Executive producers: Deborah Blum; Tony Ganz; Doug Chapin; Barry Krost; Robert M. Sertner; Frank von Zerneck
- Producers: Terence A. Donnelly; Randy Sutter
- Cinematography: James Glennon
- Editor: Robert Florio
- Running time: 93 minutes
- Production companies: Blum-Ganz Productions; Von Zerneck-Sertner Films; Touchstone Television

Original release
- Network: CBS
- Release: March 27, 1994

The Corpse Had a Familiar Face is an American crime drama television film directed by Joyce Chopra and written by Derek Marlowe and Dennis Turner. It is suggested by the autobiography of the same name by Edna Buchanan. It stars Elizabeth Montgomery as Buchanan, with Dennis Farina, Yaphet Kotto, and Audra Lindley in supporting roles. The film premiered on CBS on March 27, 1994, and received a Primetime Emmy Award nomination for its title song "Something Is Out There".

== Cast ==
- Elizabeth Montgomery as Edna Buchanan
- Dennis Farina as Detective Harry Lindstrom
- Yaphet Kotto as Detective Martin Talbot
- Audra Lindley as Monica / Edna's Mother
- Branscombe Richmond as Rodriguez
- LuAnne Ponce as Jennifer Nicholson
- Matthew Posey as Sam
- David Spielberg as George
- Lee Horsley as Ben Nicholson
- Silvana Gallardo as Mrs. Sanchez
- Kamar de los Reyes as Puerto Rican
- Carey Scott as Billy
- Kevin Patrick Walls as Stephen Hollings
- Hugh Gillin as Stanley
- Michael Ray Miller as Sal
- Steven Meek as Tom
- Stephen Peace as Rookie
- Rebecca Hahn as Cynthia
- Jessica Cole as Marcia
- Yavone Evans as Paula Nicholson
- David J. Partington as Alan

== Reception ==
=== Critical response ===
Drew Voros of Variety concluded his review by stating, "The Corpse Had a Familiar Face may seem to be a painful stretch of believability." David Hiltbrand of People called the film "a play in two distinct acts, neither of them terribly cohesive."

=== Accolades ===
Year	Award	Category	Recipient(s)	Result	Ref.
1994	46th Primetime Creative Arts Emmy Awards	Outstanding Individual Achievement in Music and Lyrics	"Something Is Out There"; Arthur Hamilton, Patrick Williams	Nominated	
