= The Book of Daniel (film) =

2013 film

- Directed by: Anna Zielinski
- Written by: Chuck Konzelman; Cary Solomon
- Based on: Book of Daniel
- Produced by: Michael Scott; David A. R. White; Russell Wolfe; Anna Zielinski
- Starring: Lance Henriksen; Robert Miano; Andrew Bongiorno
- Cinematography: Ricardo Jacques Gale
- Edited by: Gabriel Sabloff
- Music by: Will Musser
- Distributed by: Pure Flix Entertainment
- Release date: 2013
- Running time: 90 minutes
- Country: United States
- Language: English

The Book of Daniel is a 2013 Biblical drama film based on the story of Daniel from the Book of Daniel. Directed by Anna Zielinski, and produced by Michael Scott, David A. R. White, Russell Wolfe and Anna Zielinski. This straight-to-DVD drama stars Lance Henriksen, Robert Miano and Andrew Bongiorno.

== Plot ==
In Jerusalem in 605 BC, Daniel is a slave who serves Babylonian king Nebuchadnezzar. Daniel proves to be a trusty advisor and becomes one of Nebuchadnezzar's wise men. However during the reign of Darius, he is forced to make a life-or-death decision to prove his faith in God, subjecting himself to the dangers of a lions' den.

== Main cast ==
- Robert Miano as Old Daniel
- Andrew Bongiorno as Daniel
- Lance Henriksen as Cyrus the Great
- Kevin McCorkle as Croesus
- Rolf Saxon as Nebuchadnezzar II
- Peter Kluge as Darius
