= Thaao Penghlis =

Australian actor (born 1945)

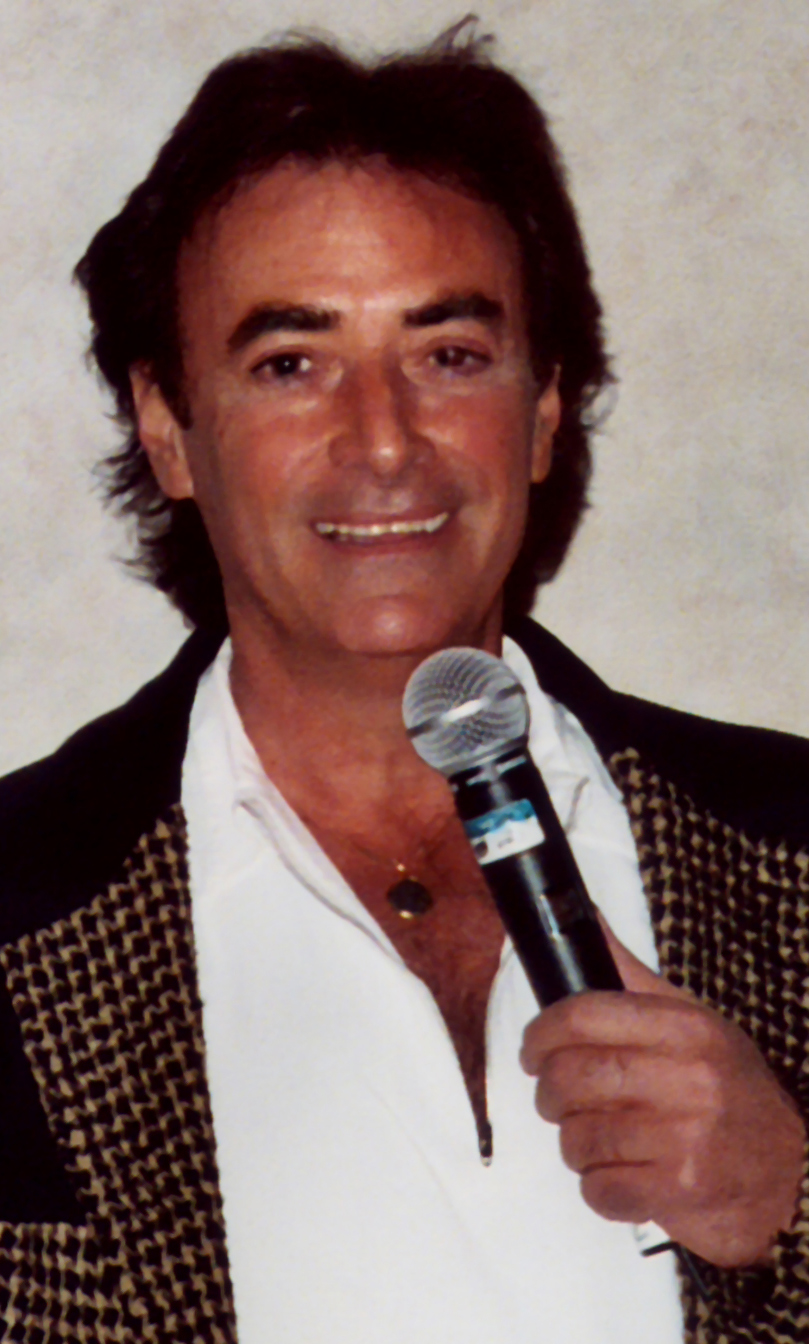
- Penghlis in 2006
- Born: 15 December 1945 (age 80); Sydney, New South Wales, Australia
- Occupation: Actor

Thaao Penghlis (/ˈteɪoʊ ˈpɛŋɡlɪs/; born 15 December 1945) is an Australian actor. He is best known for roles in United States daytime soap operas such as Days of Our Lives, Santa Barbara, and General Hospital, but has also guest-starred on a number of crime dramas, such as Kojak, Cannon, Tenspeed and Brown Shoe, Hart to Hart, Nero Wolfe and Magnum, P.I.. He also starred in the late 1980s revival of Mission: Impossible. In 1980 he was in the film Altered States. He studied under Hollywood acting teacher Milton Katselas.

== Life and career ==
Penghlis was born in Surry Hills, New South Wales. He started his career in acting on stage, performing in Jockeys under Milton Katselas's direction. Penghlis first appeared to daytime audiences in 1981 on General Hospital during the Ice Princess saga when he played the role of Victor Cassadine, brother of Mikkos and Anthony Cassadine. After his character was written out of the show by being taken to prison, he was cast as the villainous Count Tony DiMera, the son of villain Stefano DiMera in the NBC daytime drama Days of Our Lives. Penghlis returned to daytime in his one-time role of Victor Cassadine on General Hospital from 30 January 2014 to 4 March 2014, although he made subsequent returns in the same year. He returned for one episode on 1 May 2014, and then again from 7–12 August and once more from 3 September until 16 September 2014 when the character was killed.

Penghlis starred in the 1980s revival of Mission: Impossible, which was filmed in his native Australia. Penghlis' role as actor, makeup artist, and voice impersonator Nicholas Black in the revival was a counterpart to Martin Landau's Rollin Hand and Leonard Nimoy's The Great Paris.

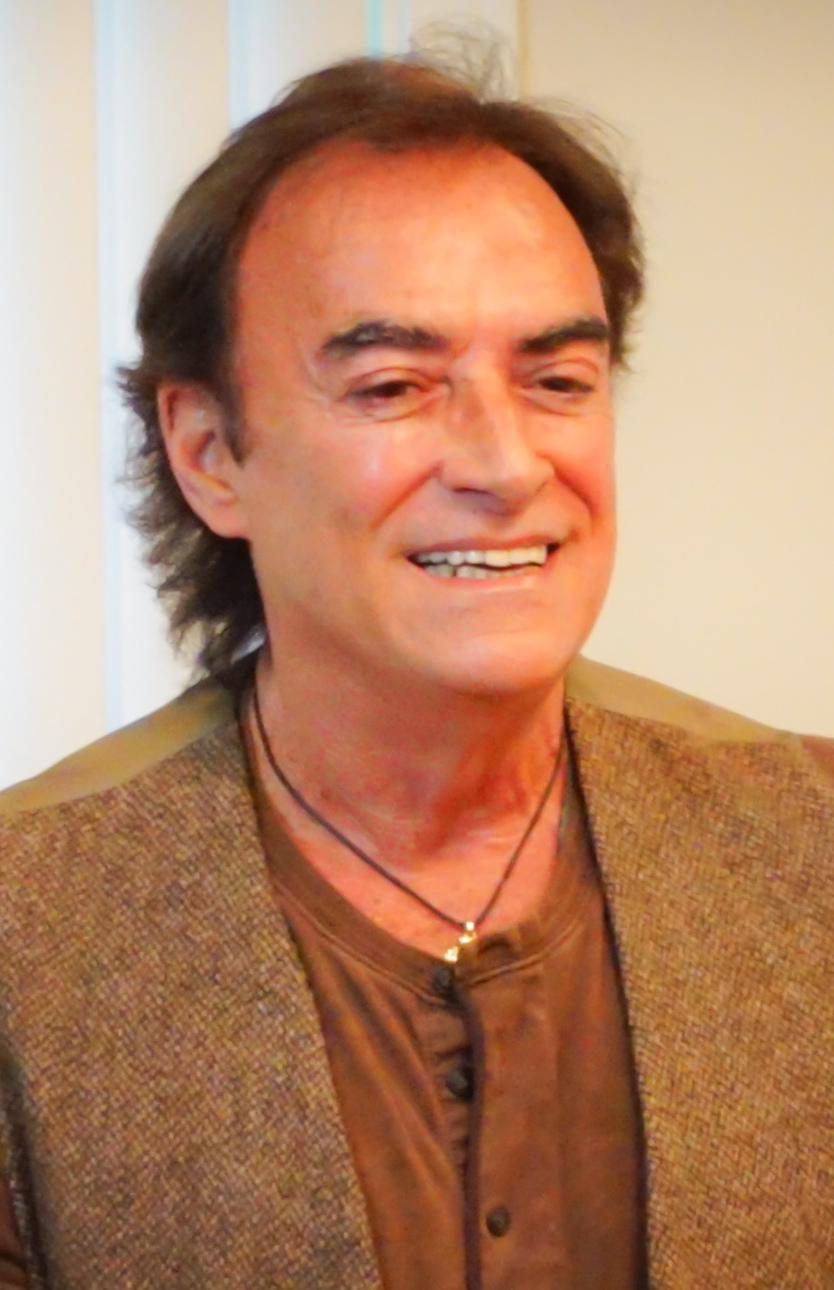
Penghlis in 2014

In 2003, Penghlis was nominated for the Soap Opera Digest Award for Favorite Return for his return to the cast of Days of Our Lives. He left the show in fall 2005. Penghlis returned to Days on 24 May 2007 to reprise the role of André DiMera. He also began reprising the role of nice guy Tony DiMera on 17 July 2007. Penghlis was nominated for Outstanding Leading Actor at the Daytime Emmy Awards in 2008. In 2009, Penghlis' character was once again written out by having him die. In 2010 Penghlis returned to stage acting, performing in New Jersey's Cape May Stage theatre. He starred in Charles Evered's play Class with Heather Matarazzo.

Penghlis played a role in the 2013 film The Book of Esther.

== Awards and nominations ==
List of acting awards and nominations
| Year | Award | Category | Title | Result | Ref. |
|---|---|---|---|---|---|
| 2003 | Soap Opera Digest Award | Favourite Return | Days of Our Lives | Nominated | |
| 2005 | Soap Opera Digest Award | Favourite Villain | Days of Our Lives | Nominated | |
| 2008 | Daytime Emmy Award | Outstanding Lead Actor in a Drama Series | Days of Our Lives | Nominated | |
| 2019 | Daytime Emmy Award | Outstanding Guest Performer in a Drama Series | Days of Our Lives | Nominated | |
| 2020 | Daytime Emmy Award | Outstanding Lead Actor in a Drama Series | Days of Our Lives | Nominated | |
