= Moms' Night Out =

- Theatrical release poster
- Directed by: The Erwin Brothers
- Written by: Jon Erwin; Andrea Gyertson Nasfell
- Produced by: Kevin Downes; Andrew Erwin; Jon Erwin; Elizabeth Hatcher-Travis; Michael Scott; David A. R. White; Russell Wolfe
- Starring: Sarah Drew; Sean Astin; Patricia Heaton; David Hunt; Andrea Logan White; Trace Adkins
- Cinematography: Kristopher Kimlin
- Edited by: Andrew Erwin; Jonathan Olive
- Music by: Marc Fantini; Steffan Fantini
- Production companies: TriStar Pictures; Affirm Films; Provident Films; Pure Flix Entertainment; Four Boys Entertainment
- Distributed by: Sony Pictures Releasing
- Release date: May 9, 2014
- Running time: 98 minutes
- Country: United States
- Language: English
- Budget: $5 million
- Box office: $10.5 million

Moms' Night Out is a 2014 American faith-based comedy film directed by the Erwin Brothers, and written by Jon Erwin and Andrea Gyertson Nasfell. The film stars Sarah Drew, Sean Astin, Patricia Heaton, and Trace Adkins. The film was released on May 9, 2014, in 1,044 theaters. The movie centers on three moms attempting to get away and have a nice night out together and the pandemonium that ensues as everyone's plans go awry. The film was shot in Birmingham, Alabama, and, though it experienced an overall negative reception, grossed $10.5 million.

== Plot ==
Allyson Field (Sarah Drew) writes an unhappy blog post about her constant stress and feelings of inadequacy. Though happily married with three children, Allyson is beset with anxiety and finds comfort in her best friend Izzy (Andrea Logan White) and mentor Sondra (Patricia Heaton).

Allyson's husband Sean (Sean Astin) recommends a night out for his overstressed wife, so she, Izzy, and Sondra plan an evening at a fancy Chinese restaurant. But Sean's half-sister Bridget (Abbie Cobb) wants Allyson to look after her baby, Phoenix, as she starts a new job the evening Allyson plans to go out with Izzy and Sondra. Sean backs up Allyson's reluctant refusal, and Bridget storms out, determined to prove she doesn't need their help. When Allyson and her friends arrive at the restaurant, they are told that their reservation has been lost. Allyson has a meltdown, stows away their cellphones in her van, and leads them across the street to go bowling, swapping their high heels for bowling shoes.

The evening degenerates with further misunderstandings and incidents. The "babysitters" - Sean, his video-gaming best friend Kevin (Kevin Downes), and Izzy's husband Marco (Robert Amaya) - take the kids to a video arcade, resulting in Sean and his son going to the emergency room. Kevin and Marco swap out a car for Allyson's van, not realizing that the women have no means of knowing about the switch. The ladies rush out of the bowling alley when Bridget, whose new job is at the bowling alley, realizes that Phoenix was not being watched by her ex like she had thought. They conclude the van was stolen and take a taxi on a wild goose chase looking for Phoenix, going to places like a tattoo parlor and a dank alley. On the way they meet a motorcyclist named 'Bones' (Trace Adkins) who goes with them and the good-humored taxi driver on their hunt. On the way they find Allyson's minivan and pursue it. Cops pull over the whole crew and all four ladies end up in a jail cell, Sondra recovering from being tasered by a cop. Allyson conveys her frustration with herself as a mom to Bones, who shares his simple philosophy with her. Everyone is reunited and absolved of charges. Allyson writes a blog post stating that her life may be stressful and crazy, but it is also beautiful.

== Cast ==
- Sarah Drew as Allyson
- Sean Astin as Sean
- Patricia Heaton as Sondra
- Andrea Logan White as Izzy
- Trace Adkins as Bones
- Shiloh Nelson as Bailey
- Robert Amaya as Marco
- Abbie Cobb as Bridget
- Harry Shum, Jr. as Joey
- David Hunt as Cabbie
- Alex Kendrick as Pastor Ray
- Anjelah Johnson as restaurant hostess
- Kevin Downes as Kevin
- Manwell Reyes as Desk Guy
- Sammi Hanratty as Zoe
- Jason Burkey as DJ
- Lou Ferrigno as The Hulk (cameo)
- Michael Leone as Brandon

== Music ==
- "Everybody Loves Me"—Performed by OneRepublic
- "Dream"—Written and performed by Priscilla Ahn
- "Til I'm Home"—Written and performed by Mandi Mapes
- "The Way I Am"—Written and performed by Ingrid Michaelson
- "Ain't Nothing Wrong with That"—Performed by Robert Randolph and the Family Band
- "Boom Boom"—Performed by Josh Mobley Featuring Reina Williams
- "Walking on Water"—Performed by Lecrae
- "Cupid Shuffle"—Performed by Cupid
- "Arabesque"—Performed by Michelle Sell
- "Push Play"—Performed by Sixx John
- "Keep Breathing"—Written and performed by Ingrid Michaelson
- "Rinse It"—Performed by R!ot
- "Gangnam Style"—Performed by Psy
- "Night of My Life"—Performed by Group 1 Crew
- "Best Day of My Life"—Performed by American Authors
- "Turn to Stone"—Written and performed by Ingrid Michaelson
- "Hurricane"—Performed by Natalie Grant

== Production ==
Filming started in June 2013 in Birmingham, Alabama, and wrapped by June 24, the Erwin brothers announced. The entire film was shot in Birmingham, hometown to the Erwin brothers. Moms' Night Out is the Erwin brothers' third feature film together and first comedy movie. Their intent was to create a clean comedy for Christian audiences and to remind mothers that God loves them just as they are. The film was produced by Kevin Downes, and husband-and-wife David Hunt and Patricia Heaton. All three of these producers also act in the movie.

== Reception ==
On Rotten Tomatoes, the film has a 21% approval rating based on 42 reviews with an average rating of 4.03/10. The site's critical consensus reads, "Cheap-looking, unfunny, and kind of sexist to boot, Moms' Night Out is a disappointment from start to finish." On Metacritic, the film has a rating of 25 out of 100, based on 20 critics, indicating "generally unfavorable reviews".

Moms' Night Out won an award for Best Film at the 46th GMA Dove Awards.

The film grossed $4.2 million in its opening weekend, finishing in seventh place. As of July 13, 2014, the film had grossed $10.5 million.
