= The Visual Bible: Acts =

- Directed by: Regardt van den Bergh
- Written by: Saint Luke; Joyce Marcarelli
- Produced by: Robert Marcarelli
- Starring: Henry O. Arnold; James Brolin; Dean Jones; Bruce Marchiano
- Cinematography: Tobie Swanepoel
- Edited by: Chuck Bush; Joanne D'Antonio
- Music by: David Miner
- Distributed by: Visual Bible International
- Release date: October 1, 1994
- Running time: 193 minutes
- Country: United States
- Language: English

The Visual Bible: Acts is a 1994 American Christian film directed by Regardt van den Bergh and starring Henry O. Arnold, James Brolin, Dean Jones, and Bruce Marchiano. It depicts the events of the Acts of the Apostles from the New Testament. All of the dialogue is word-for-word scripture, taken directly from the New International Version of the Bible.

The Visual Bible project had earlier produced The Visual Bible: Matthew in 1993. Another project, also called "Visual Bible" produced The Gospel of John 2003.

== Plot ==
Luke tells the story here. Jesus ascends to heaven after 40 days, and Judas is replaced by Matthias. The holy spirit comes to Jerusalem, after which the disciples begin to proclaim the gospel with great boldness and fruitfulness. Despite numerous arrests and increased persecution, the gospel continues to spread throughout Judea and Samaria. After the apostles encounter trouble with Saul, he eventually converts to the faith after experiencing a personal encounter with Christ on his way to Damascus. He changes his name to Paul and begins to proclaim the gospel and plant churches throughout the Roman world, and finally, Rome.

== Cast ==
- Bruce Marchiano – Jesus (although Bruce Marchiano was credited as Jesus in The Visual Bible: Matthew, in this 1994 film, he appears, but remains uncredited)
- James Brolin – Simon Peter
- Jennifer O'Neill – Lydia of Thyatira
- Henry O. Arnold – Paul of Tarsus
- Dean Jones – Luke the Evangelist
- Constantine Zakochenko – Judas Iscariot
