= Visual Bible =

The Visual Bible, also Visual Bible Project is the name used by two distinct projects to film, verbatim, books of the New Testament.

The first Visual Bible project produced The Visual Bible: Matthew (1993) and The Visual Bible: Acts (1994) starring Italian-American actor Bruce Marchiano as Jesus. Both films followed the New International Version word for word in the English version, and vernacular Bibles in versions dubbed into Spanish, Cantonese and Mandarin.

The second Visual Bible project produced The Gospel of John narrated by Christopher Plummer and starring Scottish-Peruvian actor Henry Ian Cusick as Jesus. The film followed the text of the Good News Bible.

== See also ==
- The Jesus film, 1979, starring English actor Brian Deacon as Jesus.
