= Melyssa Ade =

Former Canadian actress

- Born: November 7, 1976 (age 49); Yellowknife, Northwest Territories, Canada
- Occupation: Actress
- Years active: 1990–2013

Melyssa Ade (born November 7, 1976) is a Canadian former actress.

Born in Yellowknife, Northwest Territories, she moved as a child with her family to Toronto and later studied acting at Earl Haig Secondary School and at HB Studio in New York. After mainly appearing in television roles, Ade moved into movies with the role of Janessa in Jason X. She also appeared in several Toronto stage productions, most notably in The Teenage Girl Diaries, for which she was nominated for a 2003 Dora Mavor Moore Award.

== Filmography ==
=== Film ===
Year	Title	Role	Notes
2001	Jason X	Janessa	
2002	Interstate 60	Sally	
2005	Strange Fiction	Tracey	Short
2011	Jesus Henry Christ	Kindergarten Teacher	
2013	Crystal Lake Memories: The Complete History of Friday the 13th	Herself	Documentary film

=== Television ===
Year	Title	Role	Notes
1990	Road to Avonlea	Girl #2	"The Witch of Avonlea"
1990	Max Glick	Celia Brjynski	
1993	Maniac Mansion	Monica	"Ike for President"
1995	Visitors of the Night	Allison	TV film
1997-1999	BBS Master Control	Host	TV series
1998	Evidence of Blood	Ellie Dinker	TV film
1999	Psi Factor	Tanis Bretzki	"Nocturnal Cabal"
2000	Dear America: When Will This Cruel War Be Over?	Emma Simpson	TV film
2001	In a Heartbeat	Kelly	"Power to the Pathetic"
2001	Hitched	Monique	TV film
2004	Home Beyond the Sun	Jenna	TV film
2004	Mutant X	Kara Whitely	"The Prophecy"
2004	Blue Murder	Francine Jeffers	"Boys' Club"
2005	The Eleventh Hour	Molly	"Special Delivery"
2005	Confessions of an American Bride	Photographer	TV film
2005	Beautiful People	Paige	"Blow Up"
2006	Fatal Desire	Cindy	TV film
2006	Angela's Eyes	Dana	"In Your Eyes"
2010	Rookie Blue	Megan Taylor	"Girlfriend of the Year"
2011	Majority Rules!	Kristal	"Temporary Insanity"
2013	Cracked	Female Patient	"Voices"

== Awards and nominations ==
Year	Award	Category	Title of work	Result
2003	Dora Mavor Moore Award	Outstanding Performance by a Female (Independent Theatre)	The Teenage Girl Diaries	Nominated
