= Do You Believe? (film) =

- Theatrical release poster
- Directed by: Jon Gunn
- Written by: Chuck Konzelman; Cary Solomon
- Produced by: Harold Cronk; Michael Scott; David A. R. White; Russell Wolfe
- Starring: Mira Sorvino; Sean Astin; Alexa PenaVega; Delroy Lindo; Ted McGinley; Andrea Logan White; Madison Pettis; Brian Bosworth; Liam Matthews; Makenzie Moss; Cybill Shepherd; Lee Majors
- Cinematography: Brian Shanley
- Edited by: Vance Null
- Music by: Will Musser
- Production companies: 10 West Studios; Believe Entertainment; Pure Flix Entertainment; Toy Gun Films
- Distributed by: Pure Flix Entertainment
- Release date: March 20, 2015 (North America)
- Running time: 115 minutes
- Country: United States
- Budget: $2.3 million
- Box office: $14.4 million

Do You Believe? is a 2015 American Christian drama film directed by Jon Gunn and stars an ensemble cast featuring Ted McGinley, Mira Sorvino, Andrea Logan White, Lee Majors, Alexa PenaVega, Sean Astin, Madison Pettis, Cybill Shepherd, and Brian Bosworth. The film is distributed by Pure Flix, who released it on March 20, 2015.

== Plot ==
When a pastor, Matthew, is shaken to the core by the visible belief of a street-corner preacher, he and others come together to start to question what their religious beliefs really mean.

== Cast ==
- Mira Sorvino as Samantha
- Sean Astin as Dr. Farell
- Alexa PenaVega as Lacy
- Delroy Lindo as Street Preacher With Cross
- Ted McGinley as Matthew
- Andrea Logan White as Andrea
- Cybill Shepherd as Teri
- Lee Majors as J.D.
- Madison Pettis as Maggie
- Brian Bosworth as Joe
- Joseph Julian Soria as Carlos
- Tracy Melchior as Grace
- Valerie Domínguez as Elena
- Senyo Amoaku as "Kriminal"
- Liam Matthews as Bobby
- Shane Carson as Detective
- Delpaneaux Wills as "40 Ounce"
- Makenzie Moss as Lily
- Shwayze as Percy "Pretty Boy"
- Arthur Cartwright as "Little B"

== Reception ==
=== Box office ===
Do You Believe? opened theatrically in 1,320 venues on March 20, 2015, and earned $3,591,282 in its first weekend, ranking number six in the domestic box office, behind The Divergent Series: Insurgent, Cinderella, Run All Night, The Gunman, and Kingsman: The Secret Service.

=== Critical response ===
Do You Believe? received negative reviews from critics. The review aggregator website Rotten Tomatoes reported a 26% rating, based on 19 reviews, leaving a rating average of 4.4/10. On Metacritic, the film has a score of 22 out of 100, based on 6 critics, indicating "generally unfavorable" reviews.

Film reviewer for The Dove Foundation, Edwin L. Carpenter starts his review with, "...the best faith-based film I have ever seen!" Writing for The Times-Picayune, Mike Scott describes the film as, "It is not mainstream entertainment; it is mainstream Sunday school – which is fine if this is what you want to see at the movie theater." Scott Foundas, Chief Film Critic at Variety magazine, pans the film with "But when all its threads are finally pulled into place, Do You Believe? proves about as spiritually enlightening as a Kmart throw rug." Huffington Post's Jackie Cooper gave the film 7/10.

Michael Foust, writing for The Christian Post nominates the film as the new best evangelistic film ever, he goes on to reason, "The majority of movie critics will likely give it poor reviews, partially because it is more overtly evangelistic than any successful faith-based theatrical movie in recent history. But I'm guessing those who see the film will like it." Writing for RogerEbert.com, Peter Sobczynski reports, "Subtle as a sledgehammer to the toes and only slightly more entertaining, Do You Believe? will no doubt play well with viewers already predisposed towards liking it because it has been designed to reconfirm their already deeply-felt beliefs rather than doing anything that might cause them to think about or challenge those beliefs in any meaningful way." Newsday's Rafer Guzmán gave the film 0.5 stars out of 4 and criticized the cardboard characters and overly sentimental narratives, ultimately concluding that "the movie is primarily interested in asking a question that it has already answered."

=== Awards ===
Ted McGinley was awarded the Grace Award for his performance in the film at the 2016 MovieGuide Awards.
