= Regardt van den Bergh =

South African actor, director, screenwriter and film producer

- Born: 2 September 1952 (age 74); Johannesburg, Transvaal (province) Union of South Africa
- Citizenship: South African citizenship
- Occupations: Actor, film director, film producer and screenwriter
- Notable work: The Sheltering Desert; Boetie Gaan Border Toe

Regardt van den Bergh (born 2 September 1952 in Johannesburg, Union of South Africa) is a South African film and television actor, film director, screenwriter and film producer .

== Recognition ==
Regardt received the Ischia Global Award at the 7th annual Ischia Global Film & Music Festival on the island of Ischia, Italy, on 12 July 2009.

== Partial filmography ==
Year	Title	Role	Genre	Notes
1968	Die Kandidaat	Kallie	drama	
1971	Plekkie in Die Son	Doctor	drama	
1981	Blink Stefaans	Stafanus Taljaard	drama	
1997	Mandela and de Klerk	Magnus Malan	drama	television film
2001	Final Solution	Gerber	drama	

Director – film
Year	Title	Genre	Notes
1984	Boetie Gaan Border Toe	war/satire	
1990	Circles in a Forest	drama	
1992	The Sheltering Desert	drama/adventure	
1993	The Visual Bible: Matthew	religious	
1994	The Visual Bible: Acts	religious	
2006	Faith Like Potatoes	drama	
2008	Hansie	family/sport	
2009	Riding Tornado	drama	
2010	Die Ongelooflike Avonture van Hanna Hoekom	comedy/drama	
2016	Uitvlucht	drama/romance	
