= The Gospel of John (2003 film) =

British-North American Bible Society film

- Theatrical release poster
- Directed by: Philip Saville
- Screenplay by: John Goldsmith
- Produced by: Garth H. Drabinsky; Chris Chrisafis
- Starring: Henry Ian Cusick; Stuart Bunce
- Narrated by: Christopher Plummer
- Cinematography: Mirosław Baszak
- Edited by: Michel Arcand
- Music by: Jeff Danna
- Production company: Visual Bible International
- Distributed by: ThinkFilm
- Release date: 26 September 2003
- Running time: 180 minutes
- Countries: United Kingdom; Canada; United States
- Language: English
- Budget: $10–11 million
- Box office: $4.1 million

The Gospel of John is a 2003 epic biblical drama film that recounts the life of Jesus according to the Gospel of John. The film is a word-for-word adaptation of the American Bible Society's Good News Bible and follows the Gospel of John precisely, without additions to the story from the other Gospels or omissions of the Gospel's complex passages. It stars Henry Ian Cusick as Jesus of Nazareth, Stuart Bunce as John and is narrated by Christopher Plummer.

== Cast ==
- Henry Ian Cusick as Jesus of Nazareth
- Christopher Plummer as The Narrator
- Stuart Bunce as John
- Daniel Kash as Simon Peter
- Stephen Russell as Pontius Pilate
- Alan Van Sprang as Judas Iscariot
- Diana Berriman as Mary, mother of Jesus
- Richard Lintern as Leading Pharisee
- Scott Handy as John the Baptist
- Lynsey Baxter as Mary Magdalene
- Diego Matamoros as Nicodemus
- Nancy Palk as Samaritan Woman
- Elliot Levey as Nathanael
- Andrew Pifko as Philip
- Cedric Smith as Caiaphas
- Tristan Gemmill as Andrew
- Mariam Brown as Martha
- Mariam Hughes as Mary
- Nitzan Sharron as Lazarus
- Stuart Fox as Blind Man
- David Meyer as Lame Man
- Nicolas Van Burek as Young Levite
- William Pappas as Elderly Levite
- Jan Filips as Joseph of Arimathea

== Production ==
This film was created by a constituency of artists from Canada and the United Kingdom, along with academic and theological consultants from around the world. The cast was selected primarily from the Stratford Shakespeare Festival and Soulpepper Theatre Company, as well as Britain's Royal Shakespeare Company and Royal National Theatre. The musical score, composed by Jeff Danna and created for the film, is partially based on the music of the Biblical period. The film was produced by Visual Bible International. Filming took place in Toronto, Ontario, and Almeria and Andalucia, Spain.

== Reception ==
=== Critical response ===
On the review aggregator website Rotten Tomatoes, 37% of 49 critics' reviews are positive, with an average rating of 5.1/10. The website's critical consensus reads, "The Gospel of John takes a reverent approach to its story without ever bringing it to life, proving that cribbing from the Good Book isn't enough to guarantee a good movie." Metacritic, which uses a weighted average, assigned the film a score of 52 out of 100 based on responses from 14 critics, indicating "mixed or average reviews".

IMDB rates the film 7.8/10.

Audience opinion is very positive. Rotten Tomatoes’ Popcornmeter rates the film 89%, with widespread praise for its faithful rendering of the gospel of John and outstanding performances by celebrated actors.

=== Criticism ===
While the film is largely a faithful depiction of the Gospel of John, Rhonda Handlon of Plugged In noted that the inclusion of Mary Magdalene at the Last Supper has no direct Biblical citation, and might cause issue with viewers who prefer only direct scriptural references.

== See also ==
- The Gospel of John, a 2014 word-for-word film adaptation
- List of Easter films
- The Visual Bible: Matthew
- The Visual Bible: Acts
