= Travel the Road =

- Genre: Reality, Adventure, Missionary
- Starring: Tim Scott; Will Decker
- Country of origin: United States
- No. of seasons: 4
- No. of episodes: 69 episodes

Original release
- Network: Trinity Broadcasting Network
- Release: May 17, 2003 – present

Travel the Road is an American documentary television series following missionaries Timothy Scott and William Decker as they travel to remote, isolated, and often unstable regions to preach Christianity. The series originated in a journey the two men began in 1998, when Scott, then 19, and Decker, a photographer who was not at the time a Christian, set out with backpacks, Bibles, and a video camera. The expedition ran roughly 18 months and passed through some 25 countries, beginning in Papua New Guinea and continuing through Southeast Asia and the Himalayas. Footage from that trip was edited into a twelve-episode series that premiered on Trinity Broadcasting Network on May 17, 2003.

The program is produced and filmed entirely by Scott and Decker themselves, without a separate camera crew or support team. As of 2026 the series comprises four seasons and a number of standalone specials, totaling 69 episodes, and has aired or streamed on TBN, Daystar, INSP, Netflix, PureFlix, and YouTube. Scott and Decker remain active, continuing to produce what the ministry terms "Gospel Expeditions."

Episodes have documented travel in Papua New Guinea, Tibet, Cambodia, Borneo, Somalia, Sudan, Ethiopia, Afghanistan, Haiti, Colombia, Peru, Brazil, and the exclusion zone around Chernobyl in Ukraine. Alongside evangelism, the series has covered humanitarian subjects including the aftermath of the 2010 Haiti earthquake, narcotics trafficking in South America, and the situation of uncontacted peoples in the Amazon basin.

In December 2008, A Jewish backed organization, the Military Religious Freedom Foundation criticized the program over footage shot several years earlier in Afghanistan, alleging that Scott and Decker had been embedded with U.S. troops in violation of military restrictions on proselytizing. Scott responded that the pair had been transparent with the military about their purpose and had operated as Christian journalists documenting the conflict. When contacted by ABC News, the U.S. Army stated it no longer held records of the pair's status.is an American reality television series that documents the lives of young missionaries Tim Scott and Will Decker through more than 25 countries since 1998, in their efforts to bring Christianity into the most remote areas of the world.

Travel the Road is a part of the non-profit organization Challenge for Christ Ministries located in Colorado.
