= What If... (2010 film) =

- Directed by: Dallas Jenkins
- Written by: Chuck Konzelman; Andrea Gyertson Nasfell; Cary Solomon
- Produced by: Dallas Jenkins; Michael Scott; David A.R. White; Russell Wolfe
- Starring: Kevin Sorbo; John Ratzenberger; Kristy Swanson; Debby Ryan
- Cinematography: Todd Barron
- Edited by: Frank Reynolds
- Music by: Jeehun Hwang
- Production companies: 10 West Studios; Jenkins Entertainment
- Distributed by: Pure Flix Entertainment
- Release date: August 20, 2010
- Running time: 111 minutes
- Country: United States
- Language: English
- Budget: $600,000
- Box office: $814,906

What If... is a 2010 drama film directed by Dallas Jenkins and starring Kevin Sorbo, John Ratzenberger, Kristy Swanson and Debby Ryan. The film was released in theaters on August 20, 2010. It is the first film in a two-film partnership between Jenkins Entertainment and Pure Flix Entertainment.

== Plot ==
When Ben Walker (Kevin Sorbo) was young, he left his girlfriend Wendy (Kristy Swanson) and his hometown for a business opportunity. 15 years later he has a high-paying career and a trophy fiancée when he is visited by Mike (John Ratzenberger), an angel who gives him a glimpse into how his life would look had he followed his original plan. After that experience, Ben awakens from a coma, gives up his fiancée, and tries to reunite with Wendy. After 8 years they celebrate Kimberly's birthday.

== Cast ==
- Kevin Sorbo as Ben Walker
- Kristy Swanson as Wendy Walker
- Debby Ryan as Kimberly "Kim" Walker
- Taylor Groothuis as Megan Walker
- John Ratzenberger as Mike, the Angel
- Kristin Minter as Cynthia
- Toni Trucks as Claire
- Stelio Savante as Joel Muller
- Kevin Yon as Charlie
- Tom McElroy as James McCutcheon
- Grant James as Henryk Zimmerman

== Production ==
What If... was filmed June 28–July 14, 2009, mostly in Manistee, Michigan at 10 West Studios, with some filming done in Grand Rapids, Michigan. Jenkins Entertainment is owned by Jerry B. Jenkins and operated by his son Dallas Jenkins. Jerry served as executive producer and Dallas directed. Pure Flix Entertainment produced and supervised marketing and distribution.

== Release ==
What If... was screened at the Christian Writer's Guild conference in Denver, Colorado. The audience, which included Jerry B. Jenkins and his wife, gave the film a standing ovation.

== Reception ==
Kevin Sorbo won the Grace Award for Movies for his work in What If... at the 2011 Movieguide Awards. On the review aggregator website Rotten Tomatoes, 43% of 7 critics' reviews are positive, with an average rating of 5.8/10.

== See also ==
- List of films about angels
