= Love Finds You in Sugarcreek, Ohio (novel) =

2010 novel by Serena B. Miller

- Front cover of Love Finds You in Sugarcreek, Ohio
- Author: Serena B. Miller
- Language: English
- Series: Love Finds You
- Genre: Amish Romance; Inspirational Fiction
- Publisher: Summerside Press
- Publication date: July 2010
- Publication place: United States
- Media type: Print (Paperback)
- Pages: 320
- ISBN: 978-1609360023

Love Finds You in Sugarcreek, Ohio is an Inspirational Fiction novel written by Serena B. Miller, published by Summerside Press, and released in July 2010. Love Finds You in Sugarcreek, Ohio is part of a larger series created by Summerside Press named the Love Finds You series. The idea behind the series was to create fictional inspirational stories that took place in uniquely named geographical locations like Sugarcreek, Ohio. Love Finds You in Sugarcreek, Ohio takes place during the Swiss Festival in Sugarcreek, Ohio and the surrounding areas including Millersburg, Ohio, Walnut Creek, Ohio, and the border between Holmes County, Ohio and Tuscarawas County, Ohio area.

== Plot summary ==
Joe Matthews, a professional baseball pitcher from LA on the back end of his career, finds himself and his son (Bobby) in a picturesque community of Amish and Swiss influence after their truck breaks down. Joe is running from the paparazzi, who are constantly bombarding him and his son, about the unsolved murder of Joe's actress wife (Grace) which took place in their home. Joe doesn't want anyone to know where he is nor who he is which leads to the local Sugarcreek Policewoman, Rachel Troyer, becoming suspicious of this stranger in her town. Joe, who can't access his funds back home, needs a place to stay and finds it when he is introduced to three humble elderly Amish women who manage a rundown Amish bed and breakfast called the Sugar Haus Inn. The three Amish women: Bertha, Lydia, and Anna Troyer are the aunts and only living relatives of Rachel Troyer. Joe ends up working for his room and board and helps the women get the Sugar Haus Inn back up and running. Although Rachel Troyer is constantly suspicious of and on guard around Joe, she and he do start to form a relationship, and have to work together to solve the murder of Joe's wife.

== Characters in the novel ==
=== Main characters ===
Joe Matthews - (aka Micah Matthias) A former professional baseball pitcher from LA and love interest to Rachel.

Rachel Troyer - A Sugarcreek Police woman, love interest to Joe, and niece to the three Amish women who run the Sugar Haus Inn.

Bobby Matthews - (aka Bobby Matthias) Four-year-old son of Joe Matthews.

Eli Troyer - Elder Amish neighbor and cousin to the Troyer sisters, and humorous mentor to Joe.

Bertha Troyer - Eldest sister of the three Amish women who run the Sugar Haus Inn, and the overseer and decision maker of the Inn.

Lydia Troyer - Middle sister of the three Amish women who run the Sugar Haus Inn, and the main cook for the family.

Anna Troyer - Youngest sister of the three Amish women, and has Down syndrome which helps in becoming good friends with Bobby due to her innocence and child like behavior.

=== Other characters ===
Kim Whitfield - A Police Academy graduate who volunteers at the Sugarcreek Police office.

Stephanie Anne Fowler - Pregnant teenager taken in by Rachel Troyer after a domestic abuse situation.

Grace Matthias - The dead actress wife of Joe Matthews.

Henrietta Stiles - Manager for Joe Matthews

Darren Matthias - Joe Matthews' brother.

Dr. Robert Matthias - Joe Matthews' estranged father.

== Television Film ==
A film adaptation of Love Finds You in Sugarcreek, Ohio was created by Mission Pictures International in 2013 and turned into a television film with a set release date of spring 2014 on Up (TV network) with a later release on DVD.
