= Apostle Peter and the Last Supper =

- Directed by: Gabriel Sabloff
- Written by: Gabriel Sabloff; Timothy Ratajczak
- Produced by: Michael Scott; David A. R. White; Russell Wolfe; Anna Zielinski
- Starring: Robert Loggia; Ryan Alosio; Bruce Marchiano; Sarah Prikryl
- Cinematography: Todd Baron
- Edited by: Gabriel Sabloff
- Distributed by: Pure Flix Entertainment
- Release date: February 21, 2012
- Country: United States
- Language: English
- Budget: $750,000

Apostle Peter and the Last Supper is a 2012 film directed by Gabriel Sabloff and starring Robert Loggia, Ryan Alosio, Bruce Marchiano, Lawrence Fuller, Sarah Prikryl and Bill Oberst Jr.

The film was written by Timothy Ratajczak and Gabriel Sabloff.

== Plot ==
The film portrays Saint Peter (Alosio as the younger and Loggia as the elder) reflecting on his time with Jesus (Marchiano) and his fellow Apostles during his final imprisonment in Rome at the Mamertine Prison. In particular, Peter attempts to convert one of his jailers, Martinian (Fuller), by relating the life, teachings, and sacrifice of Jesus.

== Cast ==
- Robert Loggia as Elderly Peter
- Ryan Alosio as Peter
- Bruce Marchiano as Jesus
- Sarah Prikryl as Novella
- Laurence Fuller as Martinian
- David Kallaway as Processus
- Leon Melas as Andrew
- David Collier as Judas
- Russell Wolfe as John
- Emilio Doorgasingh as Thomas
- Sean Savage as James the Greater
- Kevin Hoffman as Phillip
- Tom Konkle as Matthew
- Bill Oberst Jr. as The Demon
- Adamo Palladino as Gallus
