= The Visual Bible: Matthew =

- Region 1 DVD cover
- The Gospel According to Matthew
- Directed by: Regardt van den Bergh
- Written by: Johann Potgieter
- Produced by: Chuck Bush
- Starring: Bruce Marchiano
- Narrated by: Richard Kiley
- Distributed by: Visual Bible International
- Release date: October 1, 1993
- Running time: 265 minutes
- Countries: South Africa; Morocco; United States
- Language: English

The Visual Bible: Matthew (also known as The Gospel According to Matthew) is a 1993 film portraying the life of Jesus as it is found in the Gospel of Matthew. The complete Gospel is presented word-for-word based on the New International Version of the Bible. It was directed by South African film maker Regardt van den Bergh and stars veteran actor Richard Kiley in the role of St. Matthew (who narrates the movie), newcomer Bruce Marchiano as Jesus, and Gerrit Schoonhoven as Peter. Marchiano portrays Jesus as a joyous, earthy, personal man with a sense of humour.

The film has been dubbed into various foreign languages including Spanish, Cantonese and Mandarin Chinese.

== Plot ==
In Israel, then known as Judea (Roman province) of the Roman Empire, Jesus Christ of Nazareth travels around the country with His disciples preaching to the people about God and salvation of their souls. As prophesied in the Old Testament books, he was born of the virgin, Mary. He performed great miracles while spreading the gospel of hope and peace as the son of God and the Messiah who can save men from eternal death if they believed in Him. He is then arrested by the Romans and crucified. He rises from the dead after three days.

== Cast ==
- Richard Kiley as Old Matthew
- Bruce Marchiano as Jesus Christ
- Joanna Weinberg as Mary (mother of Jesus)
- Tony Caprari as Joseph
- Marcel van Heerden as John the Baptist
- Gerrit Schoonhoven as Peter
- Hannes Muller as Andrew
- Charlton George as James, son of Zebedee
- Kevin Smith as John
- Ivan D. Lucas as Phillip
- Jaques De Klerk as Bartholomew
- Sean Cameron Michael as Thomas
- Matthew Dylan Roberts as Young Matthew
- Tony Joubert as James, son of Alphaeus
- Jonathan Pienaar as Thaddaeus
- Darryl Fuchs as Simon the Zealot
- Dawid Minnaar as Judas Iscariot
- Gordon van Rooyen as Caiaphas
- Brian O'Shaughnessy as Pontius Pilate
- Patrick Mynhardt as Herod the Great
- Chris Truter as Herod Antipas
- Pippa Duffy as Mary Magdalene
- Dominique Newman as the Young Woman
- David Müller as the Pharisee
- Dawie Maritz
- DeWet Van Rooyen
- Denise Newman
- Goliath Davids
- Keith Grenville
- Maria Zak and Sasha Zak as the Children of Babylon

== See also ==
- The Visual Bible: John
- The Visual Bible: Acts
- Visual Bible
- List of Easter films
