= The Book of Esther (film) =

- Based on: Book of Esther
- Written by: Timothy Ratajczak
- Directed by: David A. R. White
- Starring: Jen Lilley; Joel Smallbone; Thaao Penghlis; Robert Miano
- Music by: Will Musser
- Country of origin: United States
- Original language: English

Production
- Producers: Elizabeth Hatcher-Travis; Michael Scott; David A.R. White; Russell Wolfe; Anna Zielinski
- Cinematography: Darren Rydstrom
- Editor: Sean Paul Murphy
- Running time: 90 minutes

Original release
- Release: June 11, 2013

The Book of Esther is a 2013 American biblical-drama film directed by David A. R. White and starring Jen Lilley as Esther. The film portrays a Jewish girl, Esther, who is chosen as the new queen consort to King Xerxes I of Persia and her efforts to stop evil Lord Haman's plot to exterminate the Jews. The film is loosely based on the biblical tale of the Book of Esther. It was released on June 11, 2013, in the United States as a direct-to-TV special.

== Plot ==
In Shushan, the capital of the Persian Empire, in the year 482 BC, a Jew named Mordecai tells his young cousin, Hadassah, about a strange dream he had. He tells her that she can no longer reveal to anyone that she is a Jew, and he tells her that her new name will be Esther. He also says that their being related must also be kept a secret, because his dream foretold of terrible things to come.

Approximately 20 years later, we see Esther as an adult in the Persian capital. There is an air of great excitement, as King Xerxes is passing through the marketplace, en route to the feast he is hosting in his palace. Esther goes to speak with Mordecai, who is also getting ready for the feast. She tells him that she's envious of Xerxes, not because he's rich and powerful, but because he's married. Mordecai assures her that her time will come, when God decides it the appropriate time. While at the feast, Haman, one of the kings advisers displays anger that Mordecai is there, saying that it would give him great pleasure to see all the Jews eradicated. During the feast, the attendees notice that Queen Vashti is not present. Xerxes' commander, Sardar, reports this to him, and he has Vashti summoned. However, she refuses to come, saying that she is too busy to come and dance for him, and tells Sardar that his army can dance for the king. She says that even if the king himself would summon her, she would not come. Xerxes does not allow this impertinence to stand, and has Vashti banished from the palace, and nullifies his marriage with her.

Judith, a friend of Esther, relates the news to her. Esther replies that if she were summoned to dance, she wouldn't come either. Haman, seeing an opportunity to become closer with the king, devises a plot in which his eunuch, Gasparif will speak up at the kings meeting, and suggest his daughter, Zara, to be the next queen. In a conversation with Mordecai, Esther expresses that she would have acted the same way that Vashti did, reminding him that even if the king commanded them to break the sabbath, they would disobey him. At the meeting, Gasparif suggests Haman's daughter to be the future queen. Mordecai then speaks up, and says that he has a worthy candidate as well. The king then decrees that there will be a contest to see who will be the next queen. Haman, in a private meeting with Gasparif declares outrage over the kings decision, and tells him that he will pay dearly for causing this situation.

Later that night, Mordecai tells Esther that she has been suggested as a possible future bride for Xerxes. Esther is initially hesitant, but Mordecai warns her that if Haman's daughter were to become queen, it would be a travesty for the Jewish people. Haman returns to his home, and speaks furiously to his wife, Zaresh, saying that Mordecai will ruin his plans. His wife assures him that despite their daughter's homely appearance, she will make her presentable to the king.

Esther beseeches God, saying that she has a great challenge ahead of her, and begs Him to give her answers. The voice of God is heard, and He tells her that there will be a time for her to keep quiet, and also a time for her to speak out. At the same time, Haman sees his daughter, and expresses disgust at seeing her. Zaresh assures him that she will cover her face with a veil, to obscure it. The next day at the palace, the candidates are presented to the king. Xerxes has Esther and Zara sent to his private chamber, to await his decision. Xerxes tells Sardar that he will go to eavesdrop on their conversations, in order to figure out their true intentions. Esther inquires as to why Zara has her face covered, and she tells her that it is to hide her ugliness. Esther asks that she remove the veil, and tells Zara that she is beautiful, and that her parents have been lying to her. Zara admits that her father only wants her to be queen in order to control the king, and that she will be banished if she doesn't become queen. Esther assure her that she will have a place in the palace, as her lady-in-waiting. The next morning, the king announces his decision that Esther shall be the new queen, making his decision based on what he heard the previous night. Haman returns to his house in a fury, and tells Zaresh that he will wage a war against Mordecai and his people.

Esther is summoned by Xerxes, and has her sit by his feet, explaining that since she's not of noble birth, she has to sit below him. Esther tells him that as the king, he is the one who makes the laws, and Xerxes comes to sit beside her to talk. Sardar is seen plotting with Xerxes' bodyguard, Teres, saying that they will assassinate Xerxes that night, saying that he is too incompetent to serve. Mordecai overhears their plot, and rushes to tell the king, who has just been pulled into a meeting with Haman. Haman complains to Xerxes that since his daughter wasn't made queen his honor has been diminished, and asks to be made prime minister. Xerxes acquiesces, but tells him that it is merely another title. Mordecai arrives immediately afterwards, and tells the king about the plot to end his life. Haman demands that Mordecai bow to him, as befitting his new title, but Mordecai refuses.

Haman returns home enraged, and tells his wife that he will find a way to show the Jews as treasonous, and have them and Mordecai eradicated. Zaresh suggests that they have a gallows built, in order to hang Mordecai on it.

Haman again calls Xerxes to another meeting, and says that there is a threat to his kingdom from within. He says that the Jews are plotting treason, and quotes Hebrew scriptures, which state that God is the true king of the Jews. Haman tells him that he has selected the 13th day of the 12th month to slaughter all the Jews, and Xerxes decrees that it shall be so. Judith goes to visit Esther, who asks why Mordecai isn't there. She tells here that Mordecai is at home, mourning because of the decree. Judith tells her that she must appear before the king, and beg him to reverse the decree. She initially is hesitant, but Judith says that Mordecai has said that there is a time to keep silent, and a time to speak, but if she is silent now, she and all the Jews will surely be killed. Esther tells Judith to ask all the Jews to fast on her behalf, for since the king did not summon her, she might be put to death upon her unannounced arrival.

Esther appears before the king, and finds favor in his eyes. She requests that the king and Haman come to a feast that she will be preparing the next day. Haman returns to his home, giddy that all of his plans are going well, and that he is the only other person who is invited to Esther's feast. While at the feast, Xerxes says he will grant Esther any request, even up to half his kingdom. Esther beseeches the king, telling him that there is a great enemy in his palace, because Haman has ordered the slaughter of her and her people. Esther reminds him that Mordecai once saved the king's life, and Xerxes declares that there will be a trial held to verify whether Mordecai is innocent or not. At the trial, Xerxes again asks Haman to show his proof, and he does so willingly. Mordecai replies that God also appoints kings, and that to disobey the king would be to disobey God. Haman asks Mordecai whom he would obey in a situation where the word of God conflicted with the word of the king. Mordecai replies that long before Xerxes was even born, the Jews had worshiped the God of Israel. The people at the meeting are outraged, and call Mordecai a traitor. Esther then speaks up on behalf of Mordecai, reminding Xerxes that he once provided Mordecai with a royal horse and clothes for saving his life. She asks the same question to Xerxes that Haman asked to Mordecai, who declares that he would have the man follow his own conscience, for even a king can make a mistake.

The king absolves the Jews of all counts of treason, saying that none of them will be harmed. Xerxes then declares that Haman shall be hanged on a gallows, and Haman's eunuch tells the king that Haman has already constructed a gallows. Xerxes states that that day shall be a day of happiness and great joy for the Jews for all of history, and that the events shall be recorded in writing. Mordecai is appointed as the new prime minister, and a feast is thrown for the Jews to celebrate their newfound freedom.

== Cast ==
- Jen Lilley as Queen Esther: Born from a family which did not come from nobility, with her grace and charm she was chosen to become the Queen of Persia, and she ends up playing an important role in the salvation of the Jews.
- Joel Smallbone as King Xerxes: The king of the Persian Empire the year 482 BC. A kind King, someone who is motivated by justice. He ends up marrying Esther, and is constantly battling to find true loyalty in his kingship.
- Thaao Penghlis as Haman: One of King Xerxes' closest and trusted advisors, he is the main antagonist of the film. After having witnessed the expulsion of the queen, he felt very strongly that his daughter should be anointed as the new queen of Persia, and his motive for wanting his daughter to become the queen was to earn more power in the kingdom. After having failed to get his daughter as to become the new Queen, he conspires and manipulates the King to decree an annihilation of the Jews of Persia.
- Robert Miano as Mordecai: A Jew who becomes one of the King's closest advisors. After having witnessed the expulsion of the Queen in the banquet, he suggest that his cousin, Esther, be considered as the new Queen. He is a wise, and intelligent man who plays a big role in the salvation of the Jews.
- Russell Wolfe as Sardar: The Kings commander, and right hand man. He is later seen conspiring to murder Xerxes.
- Mark Irvingsen as Gasparif: Haman's eunuch who helps Haman come up with his malicious plan to wipe out the Jews. He also plays a key role in the inauguration of the new Queen as he is the one to speak up and suggest Haman's daughter as the a "good fit" for queen.
- Kerry Stein as Azada
- Kass Connors as Teres. Xerxes' bodyguard, who conspires with Sardar to murder Xerxes.
- Hadeel Sittu as Zara: Haman's daughter, she was highly suggested by Haman and Gasparif to be chosen as the new queen. Having been maltreated by her father and being threatened to be expelled from her house if she did not become the new queen, she ends up becoming close with Esther, and moves into the palace as one of Esther's closest servants.
- Eliza Roberts as Judith: One of Esther's closest friends, who reveals to her that she has been chosen to stand in front of the Queen to be scouted for marriage.
- Linda Bisesti as Zaresh: Haman's wife, who just like her husband, had the same desire towards wanting to take control of the kingdom. She agrees to send her daughter Zara as a candidate for Queen, and supports Haman in his malicious plans to take over the kingdom and annihilate the Jews.
- Tiny Ron as Nasir
- Marco Khan as Guard #2
- Cory Oliver as Daria
- fr:Jennifer Lyons as Vashti: She was King Xerxes wife and Queen of Persia. During one the King banquet's she gets summoned to come and show herself in front of the people, and after refusing to show her face, gets banished from the kingdom.
- Carl Turner as Noble #1
- John Clement as Noble #2
- David Pires as Noble #3
- Lauren Wolfe as Hadassah

== Reception ==
The film provoked some positive feedback. However, the movie differed sufficiently from the Bible story that some viewers were offended. In their review of the movie, AskBible.org said that "the movie veered so far from the Bible, that it's impossible for us to recommend it to any audience." The film does state in the beginning that some events have been altered for dramatic purposes. AskBible.org also wrote that "The acting was poor, the movie is underwhelming and the limited budget available to the producers is clearly evident. What is obvious to the viewer is the inconsistent performance of the main cast. The lead actress does do a good job playing Esther but the King on the other hand was a failure. He is not a good actor, and hardly has the screen presence required for such an important character in the story." FaithFlix.com wrote that "The movie does feel a bit like a soap opera, which makes perfect sense considering many of the actors have a soap background."
