= The Mark (2012 film) =

- Directed by: James Chankin
- Produced by: James Chankin; David A.R. White; Russell Wolfe
- Starring: Craig Sheffer; Gary Daniels; Sonia Couling; Ivan Kamaras; Eric Roberts; Art Supawatt Purdy
- Edited by: Vance Null
- Music by: Edwin Wendler
- Distributed by: Pure Flix Entertainment
- Release date: October 16, 2012
- Running time: 94 minutes
- Country: United States
- Language: English
- Budget: $1.5 million

The Mark is a 2012 Christian film about the Rapture, directed by James Chankin and starring Craig Sheffer.

== Plot ==
Chad Turner is implanted with a biometric computer chip (the Mark of the Beast). The Rapture occurs, and Joseph Pike searches for Turner in hopes of gaining control of the Mark. Cooper, the security head of the company that created the chip, Avanti; is held hostage by Pike in order to locate Turner. Chad Turner must stay alive against all odds and keep the chip from falling into the wrong hands.

== Cast ==
- Craig Sheffer as Chad Turner
- Gary Daniels as Joseph Pike
- Eric Roberts as Cooper
- Sonia Couling as Dao, Flight Attendant
- Byron Gibson as Jenson
- Art Supawatt Purdy as Jock

== Sequel ==
A sequel titled The Mark 2: Redemption was released in 2013, taking place right after the ending of the first film. The plot follows the main cast from the first film right after the events of the last film, just as the Antichrist rises to power. The film features all of the original cast reprising their roles. The ending of the film hints for a sequel, but none has been confirmed as of yet.
