= Home Beyond the Sun =

- Written by: John Patus
- Directed by: Colin Chilvers
- Starring: Melyssa Ade; Molly Sayers
- Country of origin: United States
- Original language: English

Production
- Producers: Byron M. Jones; Steve Hutchings; Colin Chilvers
- Running time: 96 minutes
- Production company: Garden City Pictures

Original release
- Release: February 20, 2004

Home Beyond the Sun is a 2004 film about a fight for freedom, and a search for truth.

== Plot ==
Home Beyond the Sun is the story of persecution, faith, and escaping a world of fear. Bible-college student Jenna goes to teach in an area of China where her faith is forbidden. She discovers an orphanage, befriends Chinese orphan Chu Lee, and tries to help her get adopted by a family in the United States. Unfortunately, the Chinese police strenuously forbid this when they discover that Jenna and the prospective adoptive family are Christians.

== Cast ==
- Melyssa Ade - Jenna
- Stan Coles - Pastor Dan
- Von Flores - Colonel Khan
- Dana Ishiura - Ehr Neung
- Molly Sayers - Chu Lee
- Mung-Ling Tsui - Mei Ming
- Nobby Suzuki - Chu's Grandfather
- Jason Vu - Chinese student

== Awards ==
2004 Best Dramatic Film WYSIWYG Film Festival

12+ Seal by The Dove Foundation
