= The Wager (2007 film) =

- Directed by: Judson Pearce Morgan
- Written by: Judson Pearce Morgan (screenplay); Bill Myers (book)
- Produced by: Elizabeth Hatcher-Travis; Michael Scott; David A.R. White; Russell Wolfe
- Starring: Randy Travis; Jude Ciccolella; Nancy Stafford; Nancy Valen; Kelly Overton; Bronson Pinchot; Candace Cameron Bure; Doug Jones
- Cinematography: Todd Barron
- Edited by: Judson Pearce Morgan; Marcos Soriano
- Production company: Blazing Sun Productions
- Distributed by: Pure Flix Entertainment
- Release date: June 15, 2007
- Country: United States
- Language: English

The Wager is a 2007 Christian drama film, directed by Judson Pearce Morgan and starring Randy Travis, Jude Ciccolella and Candace Cameron Bure. It was based on the novel The Wager by Bill Myers. Billy DaMota did casting for the film.

== Synopsis ==
Michael Steele (Randy Travis) is an actor at the pinnacle of his Hollywood career. In the wake of being nominated for Best Actor at the Academy Awards, he is cast in what might be the role of his lifetime in an incredible story of monumental conflict. Will all the gossip swirling around him cause him to stumble on the path of righteousness? His marriage is in jeopardy and his career is on the line. He has always tried to do the right thing; now he must find the courage and conviction needed to straighten out his life.

== Cast ==
- Randy Travis as Michael Steele
- Jude Ciccolella as Kenny
- Nancy Stafford as Annie Steele
- Nancy Valen as Tanya Steele
- Kelly Overton as Tessa
- Bronson Pinchot as Colin Buchanan
- Candace Cameron Bure as Cassandra
- Doug Jones as Peter Barrett

== Release ==
The Wager was released theatrically on June 27, 2007. It was released to churches by Outreach Cinema, a Christian group that organizes showings of faith-based film at churches nationwide. Christian distribution company Pure Flix Entertainment released the film to DVD on May 13. The Wager was one of 14 Christian films featured at the 2008 Gideon Media Arts Conference and Film Festival.

=== Reception ===
Brett McCracken of Christianity Today gave the film 1/2 out of 4 stars, writing, "Quite simply, and across the board, The Wager is not a good film. But as a "Christian" film, with its low budget and artistic limitations, it at least gives a good try..." Movieguide Magazine wrote, "The Wager is produced well. The camerawork, the editing, and the direction capture your attention... The script loses its focus two or three times and could have been fixed ahead of time... Overall, however, the movie works very well and the filmmakers should be commended."
