= David A. R. White =

American actor

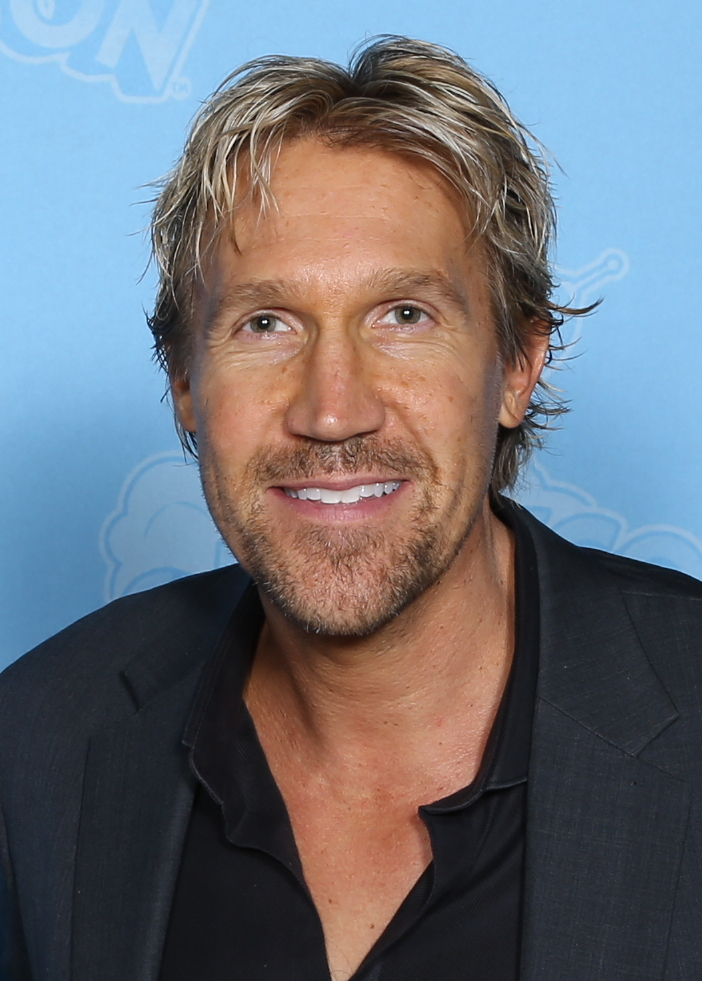
- White at the 2019 GalaxyCon in Richmond, Virginia
- Born: David Andrew Roy White; Dodge City, Kansas, United States
- Occupations: Actor; director; screenwriter; producer; business
- Years active: 1989–present
- Known for: founding Pinnacle Peak Pictures
- Notable work: God's Not Dead series
- Spouse: Andrea Logan (m. 2003, divorced)
- Children: 3
- Awards: Awards and Nominations

David Andrew Roy White is an American actor, film director, screenwriter, film producer, and businessman. He co-founded Pinnacle Peak Pictures, a distribution and production company specializing in Christian faith-themed and family-themed films. He is best known for his role as Reverend Dave in the God's Not Dead film series.

== Personal life ==
White is the son of a Mennonite pastor. He and actress and producer Andrea Logan were married. Logan played the role of his wife in In the Blink of an Eye, a 2009 film. In 2020, the couple announced that they had separated.

== Career ==
After his arrival in Los Angeles, White was given the role of Andrew Phillpot, the best friend of Burt Reynolds' son, in the CBS sitcom Evening Shade (1990–1994). White had guest appearances in television series including Coach, California Dreams, Sisters and Melrose Place. He was a protagonist, Dan Burgess, in Second Glance, where his closing line "Hey Scotty, Jesus Man" turned into a meme. Among his early films were 20th Century Fox's The Visitation, an adaptation of the novel by author Frank Peretti, Bells of Innocence with actor Chuck Norris, and Mercy Streets, for which he was nominated for The MovieGuide Awards' Best Actor. In 2003 White starred alongside Jeffrey Dean Morgan in Six: The Mark Unleashed.

In 2005, he founded Pure Flix (Pinnacle Peak Pictures) with Michael Scott, Russell Wolfe, and Elizabeth Travis. Over the next several years, he produced and starred in several films including In the Blink of an Eye, Hidden Secrets, and The Moment After.

In 2011, White played Shane Daughtry in Jerusalem Countdown. In 2012, he played James in Brother White, Special Agent Ric Caperna in The Encounter: Paradise Lost (sequel to the 2011 film The Encounter, which he produced and directed) and pastor Rich Chaplin in Me Again, a film about a pastor unhappy with his life. He was nominated for a TCA best actor award. In 2014, he co-starred as a pastor in the film God's Not Dead. He starred in and produced two sequels, God's Not Dead 2 (2016) and God's Not Dead: A Light in Darkness (2018), but only starred in God's Not Dead: We the People (2021). White also starred in the Pure Flix produced "Revelation Road" film series. He played a former government assassin turned Christian who struggles to survive a lawless post-rapture wasteland.

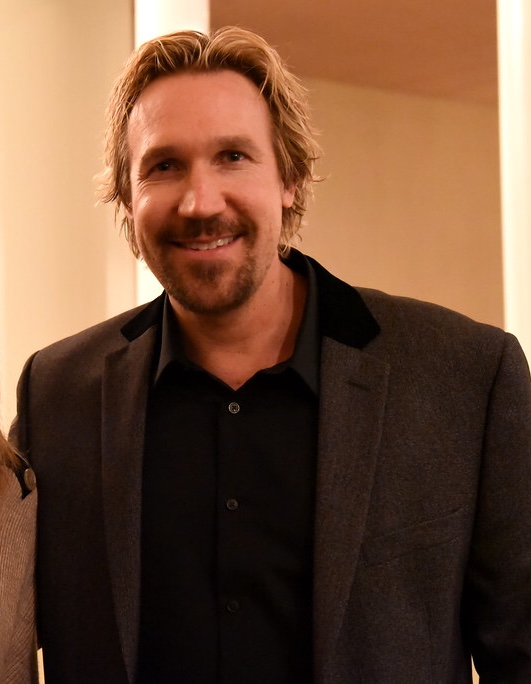
White in Toledo, Ohio, November 2015

He created, produced, and starred in the sitcom Malibu Dan the Family Man in 2018.

== Filmography ==
White produced God's Not Dead 2 and God's Not Dead: A Light in Darkness.

=== Film ===
Year	Title	Actor	Producer	Director	Writer	Role	Notes
1990	Geronimo	Yes	No	No	No	Overbearing Counselor	Also grip technician
1992	Second Glance	Yes	No	No	No	Dan Burgess	Also production assistant
1994	The Crossing	Yes	No	No	No	Matt	Short film
1995	Outbreak	Uncredited	No	No	No	Army Pilot	
1998	End of the Harvest	Yes	Associate	No	No	Matt	
1999	Murdercycle	Yes	No	No	No	Ditko	
1999	The Moment After	Yes	Yes	No	No	Adam Riley	
2000	Mercy Streets	Yes	Yes	No	No	John/Jeremiah	
2003	Bells of Innocence	Yes	No	No	No	Conrad Champlain	
2003	The Sparky Chronicle: The Map	Yes	No	No	No	Ethan Parker	Direct-to-video short
2004	Six: The Mark Unleashed	Yes	Yes	No	Yes	Brody Sutton	
2006	The Visitation	Yes	Co-producer	No	No	Carl	
2006	The Moment After 2: The Awakening	Yes	Yes	No	No	Adam Riley	
2006	Hidden Secrets	Yes	Yes	No	Yes	Jeremy Evans	
2007	The Wager	Yes	Yes	No	No	Tom	
2009	Sarah's Choice	No	Yes	No	No	—N/a	
2009	In the Blink of an Eye	Yes	Yes	No	Yes	David	
2010	What If...	No	Yes	No	No	—N/a	
2010	Holyman Undercover	Yes	Yes	Yes	Yes	Roy/Brian	
2010	Johnny	No	Yes	No	No	—N/a	
2011	Run On	Yes	Yes	No	Yes		
2011	The Encounter	Yes	Yes	Yes	No	Customer in Thailand	
2011	Jerusalem Countdown	Yes	Yes	No	Story	Shane	
2011	Marriage Retreat	Yes	Yes	No	No	Mark Bowman	
2012	Apostle Peter and the Last Supper	No	Yes	No	No	—N/a	
2012	Ghost Soldiers	Yes	Yes	No	No	Joe	
2012	The Encounter: Paradise Lost	Yes	Yes	No	No	Rik Caperna	
2012	The Mark	No	Yes	No	No	—N/a	
2012	Me Again	Yes	Yes	Yes	No	Rich Chaplin	Co-directed with Jeffrey Peterson
2012	Brother White	Yes	Yes	No	No	James White	Based on a character created by him
2013	Revelation Road: The Beginning of the End	Yes	Yes	No	No	Josh McManus	
2013	This is Our Time	No	Yes	No	No	—N/a	
2013	The Book of Esther	No	Yes	Yes	No	—N/a	
2013	Revelation Road 2: The Sea of Glass and Fire	Yes	Yes	No	No	Josh McManus	
2013	The Book of Daniel	No	Yes	No	No	—N/a	
2014	God's Not Dead	Yes	Yes	No	No	Reverend Dave Hill	
2014	Moms' Night Out	No	Yes	No	No	—N/a	
2014	Redeemed	Yes	Yes	Yes	No	David	
2014	The Black Rider: Revelation Road	Yes	Yes	No	Story	Josh McManus	
2015	Do You Believe?	No	Yes	No	No	—N/a	
2015	Dancer and the Dame	Yes	Yes	No	No	Eric Skanz	
2015	Faith of Our Fathers	Yes	Yes	No	Yes	Wayne	
2016	God's Not Dead 2	Yes	Yes	No	No	Reverend Dave Hill	
2017	The Case for Christ	No	Yes	No	No	—N/a	
2017	A Question of Faith	No	Yes	No	No	—N/a	
2018	God's Not Dead: A Light in Darkness	Yes	Yes	No	No	Reverend Dave Hill	
2018	The Prayer Box	No	Yes	No	No	—N/a	
2020	Courting Mom and Dad	No	Yes	No	No	—N/a	
2020	Beckman	Yes	Executive	No	No	Aaron Beckman	
2021	God's Not Dead: We the People	Yes	Yes	No	No	Reverend Dave Hill	
2021	Love on the Rock	Yes	Yes	No	Yes	Colton Riggs	Also executive producer
2021	Nothing's Impossible	Yes	No	No	No	Scott Beck	
2022	Redeeming Love	No	Yes	No	No	—N/a	
2022	Strong Fathers, Strong Daughters	No	Executive	No	No	—N/a	Post-production
2024	God's Not Dead: In God We Trust	Yes	Yes	No	No	Reverend Dave Hill	
2025	A Line of Fire	Yes	Yes	No	No	Cash	
2026	Straight Shot	Yes	Yes	No	No	Frank Keller	

=== Television ===
Year	Title	Actor	Producer	Creator	Role	Notes
1991	The Antagonists	Yes	No	No	Officer Kooch	Episode: "Con Safos"
1991-1993	Evening Shade	Yes	No	No	Andrew Philipott	8 episodes
1992	Coach	Yes	No	No	Pizza Delivery Kid	Episode: "War of the Dopes"
1992	Honor Thy Mother	Yes	No	No	Student	TV movie
1993	Melrose Place	Yes	No	No	Room Service Waiter	Episode: "Cold Turkey"
1993	California Dreams	Yes	No	No	Usher	Episode: "21 Jake Street"
1993	Saved by the Bell: The College Years	Yes	No	No	Student	Episode: "Prof. Zack"
1994	Sisters	Yes	No	No	Gas Station Attendant	Episode: "Down To The Count"
1995	Renegade	Yes	No	No	Hotel Clerk	Episode: "Living Legend"
1996	Kindred: The Embraced	Yes	No	No	Clerk	Episode: " Live Hard, Die Young, and Leave a Good Looking Corpse"
1996	Space: Above and Beyond	Yes	No	No	Ensign Lewis	Episode: "Stardust"
1999	Martial Law	Yes	No	No	Scott Payne	Episode: "Captive Hearts"
1999	Invisible Child	Yes	No	No	Mr. Felix	TV movie
1999	A Vow to Cherish	Yes	No	No	ER Resident	TV movie
2016	Hitting the Breaks	Yes	Yes	Yes	Randy Wilcox	10 episodes Also executive producer
2017-2018	Hilton Dead Island	No	Executive	No	—N/a	32 episodes
2017-2018	Malibu Dan the Family Man	Yes	No	Yes	Dan Marshall	24 episodes
2019	Home Schooled	No	Executive	No	—N/a	5 episodes
2019	The Wandered	No	Executive	No	—N/a	6 episodes
2019	The Power Couple	No	Executive	No	—N/a	6 episodes
2019	Mood Swings	No	Executive	No	—N/a	8 episodes
2019	The Encounter	No	Yes	No	—N/a	6 episodes Also executive producer ano directed episode "Just Believe"
2019-2022	Sons of Thunder	No	Executive	No	—N/a	14 episodes
2020	Finding Love in Quarantine	Yes	Yes	No	Rick Baldwin	8 episodes Also executive producer and wrote 3 episodes
2021	Love Is On the Air	No	Executive	No	—N/a	TV movie

== Writings ==
White published the book Between Heaven and Hollywood: Chasing Your God-Given Dream.

== Awards and nominations ==
=== Movieguide Awards ===
Year	Category	Nominated work	Result	Ref.
2017	The Grace Award for Acting	God's Not Dead 2	Nominated	
2019	The Grace Award for Acting	God's Not Dead: A Light in Darkness	Nominated	

== See also ==
- Kevin Downes
