= In the Blink of an Eye (2009 film) =

- Directed by: Michael Sinclair
- Written by: Byron M. Jones; Jon Macy; David A. R. White; Russell Wolfe
- Produced by: Byron M. Jones; David A. R. White; Russell Wolfe
- Starring: David A. R. White; Eric Roberts; Andrea Logan White
- Cinematography: Darren Rydstrom
- Edited by: Sean Paul Murphy
- Production company: Pure Flix Entertainment
- Distributed by: Echo Bridge Home Entertainment; Pure Flix Entertainment
- Release date: November 17, 2009
- Running time: 86 minutes
- Country: United States
- Language: English

In the Blink of an Eye is a 2009 American film about the Rapture directed by Michael Sinclair and starring David A. R. White, Eric Roberts, and Andrea Logan White. It was released to DVD on November 17, 2009.

== Plot ==
When detectives Larry and David are searching for a missing singer in an abandoned trailer park, David is shot at twice; with his cellphone taking the bullet that had been headed for his heart. David kills the kidnapper, when a man, Kevin, comes and tells him that he is taking the singer on a yacht for a few days. The cops get an invitation onto the yacht; Kevin is a suspect of other crimes, but their boss has nothing on him.

The detectives take their wives along on the yacht, telling them it's a vacation. As the boat departs, they discuss growing tensions between Israel and Iran. On the yacht, David's boss calls and tells him that the kidnapper had a picture of him sitting beside Kevin. David's wife Lori argues with him because he isn't paying attention to her. He asks Kevin about the photo, but Kevin claims he was just trying to get close to the glitz and glamour.

Lori is in her room with Larry's wife Suzette. They talk about how Jesus can give peace, which Lori states that she wants. Lori then asks God into her life and is saved. The next day she is upbeat. When Larry and Sue visit an island, Lori and David stay behind and have a picnic, and she tells him she loves him. He asks what has gotten into her and she responds coyly; he says he wants to rest after their picnic, and she goes to look for seashells. He closes his eyes, and when he wakes up, Lori, Suzette, and Larry have disappeared. When the crew tries to radio for help, they discover that disappearances are occurring worldwide. David falls asleep, only for the day to repeat.

David gradually realises that he is in a time loop, and that the Rapture is occurring. After numerous attempts to find a solution, he meets with Lori, Suzette, and Larry and gives himself to Christ.

Larry makes a call to his boss, who is then shocked when his town descends into chaos from the Rapture. Kevin finds Larry's glasses, and asks a friend if they have seen them.

== Cast ==
- David A. R. White as David
- Eric Roberts as Captain Jones
- Andrea Logan White as Lori
- Lonnie Colón as Larry
- Anise Fuller as Suzette

== Release ==
In the Blink of an Eye was released to DVD on November 17, 2009. A week before the release, Pastor John Hagee (who is mentioned in the film) aired a special broadcast of his daily television program to discuss the importance of the film's message. The DVD includes several special features, including a commentary, making-of special and film trailers.

=== Reception ===
Angela Walker of ChristianCinema.com gave the film 3½ out of 5 stars, saying, "The camera action is very good... except for a few shots where the angles and distances don't seem quite right, it's a nice piece of cinematography." Russ Jones of the Christian Press said, "While the production values aren’t at the level of a major Hollywood film, this is a movie you can watch with your family and actually have significant issues to discuss."
