= The Encounter (2011 film) =

2010 film by David A. R. White

- Film poster
- Directed by: David A. R. White
- Written by: Sean Paul Murphy; Timothy Ratajczak
- Produced by: Elizabeth Travis; Brittany Lefebre; Russell Wolfe; Michael Scott; David A. R. White
- Starring: Bruce Marchiano; Steve "Sting" Borden; Jaci Velasquez; Jamie Nieto; Danah Davis; Madison Gibney; Kass Connors
- Cinematography: Darren Rydstrom
- Edited by: Sean Paul Murphy
- Music by: Matt Gates; Ido Waksman
- Production companies: God & Country Entertainment
- Distributed by: Pure Flix Entertainment
- Release date: May 3, 2011
- Running time: 85 minutes
- Country: United States
- Language: English

The Encounter is an American 2011 Christian film. The role of Jesus, in modern dress, appearing at a diner in modern-day America, is played by Bruce Marchiano who played Jesus in The Visual Bible: Matthew. It is the first installment of the franchise The Encounter.

== Plot ==
The Encounter follows 5 strangers living in California: Nick, an atheist, former NFL player, and owner of a chain of burger restaurants; Hank and Catherine, whose marriage is falling apart; Melissa, a Christian on the way to visit her boyfriend (who is an atheist), and Kayla, a hitchhiker escaping her abusive stepfather in Los Angeles. When a detour road is closed off, the 5 are stranded in a diner with its omnipresent owner, who discreetly reveals himself to be Jesus, and attempts to help each of the patrons to face the truth in his or her life, particularly its dark side, to seek repentance and go for reconciliation.

Along with serving them, Jesus helps Hank and Catherine re-establish dialogue as a couple, helps Melissa think of the long-term difficulties she will face in a relationship, and marriage, with her boyfriend who is a non-believer, and helps Kayla find in her heart the strength to forgive her abusive stepfather, despite everything he has done.

Each patron at the diner ends up being either born again or is brought to a life-changing decision except for Nick, whose pride and selfishness block him and cause him to reject all questioning of his lifestyle and purpose, in spite of acknowledging having been deeply loved by his grandmother. Officer Deville (the police officer who first informed the patrons of the road being closed off) returns and tells everyone that the road has been re-opened. Nick happily leaves with Deville, who gloats that he has "taken one" from Jesus, who counters that he has "saved four".

As the other patrons leave the diner, they learn from an officer on the road that the road is closed again, because of a serious car accident. They learn that Nick was involved in the crash, which killed him instantly. He also reveals that he has never heard of a Police Officer named 'Deville'. Then Kayla realizes that Deville is actually the Devil in disguise based on the pronunciation of his surname.

The next day, Hank and Catherine find that the diner has mysteriously vanished because Jesus has managed to accomplish his mission of turning their lives around. In Thailand, Jesus shows up as a waiter, alluding to the 2012 sequel film, The Encounter: Paradise Lost.

== Cast ==
- Bruce Marchiano as Jesus
- Steve "Sting" Borden as Nick
- Jaci Velasquez as Melissa
- Jamie Nieto as Hank
- Danah Davis as Catherine
- Madison Gibney as Kayla
- Kass Connors as Officer Deville
- Marc Davies as Officer Tom
- Connor Greenbaum as Young Nick
- Elizabeth Ince as Sadie
- Alexandra Samia as Young Melissa
- Olivia Samia as Annie
- Tom Saab as himself
- William Waters as Kayla's Drunken Stepfather
- David A. R. White as Customer in Thailand (non-speaking cameo)

== Sequel ==
In 2012, a sequel named The Encounter: Paradise Lost was produced, with Bruce Marchiano returning to the role of Jesus. It follows six strangers who find themselves trapped by the threat of an oncoming hurricane in a beachside resort with Jesus, who attempts to spiritually redeem all of them.

=== Cast ===
- David A. R. White as Special Agent Ric Caperna
- Bruce Marchiano as Jesus
- Gary Daniels as Charlie Doles
- Robert Miano as Bruno Mingarelli
- Ammy Chanicha as Mimi Mingarelli
- Rif Hutton as Chris Ward
- Shelley Robertson as Helen Ward
- Kass Connors as Mr. Deville
- Sahajak Boonthanakit as Joseph Weinholt

== TV series ==
On October 14, 2016, Pure Flix uploaded a trailer for a series based on (and taking its title from) the film, which the eight-episode first season of premiered on October 21, 2016. An eight-episode second season has also been released.
