= List of religious films =

This is a list of films with religious themes.

== List ==
Year	Title	religion
1900	Soldiers of the Cross	
1909	Heroes of the Cross	
1909	The Scottish Covenanters	
1916	Civilization	
1923	The Hunchback of Notre Dame	
1923	The Ten Commandments	
1925	Ben-Hur	
1927	The King of Kings	
1928	Noah's Ark	
1928	The Passion of Joan of Arc	
1932	The Sign of the Cross	
1935	The Last Days of Pompeii	
1937	Green Light	
1939	The Hunchback of Notre Dame	
1940	Santa Fe Trail	
1941	Sergeant York	
1941	One Foot in Heaven	
1943	Heaven Can Wait	
1943	The Song of Bernadette	
1944	Going My Way	
1944	The Keys of the Kingdom	
1945	The Bells of St. Mary's	
1947	Black Narcissus	
1949	Come to the Stable	
1948	Joan of Arc	
1950	The Next Voice You Hear...	
1950	Stars in My Crown	
1951	The Diary of a Country Priest	
1951	Quo Vadis	
1952	Red Planet Mars	
1953	I Confess	
1953	Martin Luther	
1953	The Robe	
1954	Demetrius and the Gladiators	
1954	Magnificent Obsession	
1955	Ordet	
1955	A Man Called Peter	
1956	The Burmese Harp	
1956	Friendly Persuasion	
1956	The Ten Commandments	
1957	The Seventh Seal	
1959	The Nun's Story	
1959	Ben-Hur	
1959	The Big Fisherman	
1960	Devi	
1960	Elmer Gantry	
1960	Spartacus	
1960	The Story of Ruth	
1961	Barabbas	
1961	The Hoodlum Priest	
1961	King of Kings	
1963	The Cardinal	
1963	Jacob and Esau	
1963	Lilies of the Field	
1963	Winter Light	
1964	Becket	
1964	The Gospel According to St. Matthew	
1965	The Greatest Story Ever Told	
1966	Andrei Rublev	
1966	The Bible: In the Beginning...	
1966	A Man for All Seasons	
1971	The Night God Screamed	
1972	Marjoe	
1972	Siddhartha	
1973	The Exorcist	
1973	Jesus Christ Superstar	
1974	The Story of Jacob and Joseph	
1975	The Hiding Place	
1976	The Message	
1977–1984	Oh, God! (series)	
1977	Exorcist II: The Heretic	
1977	Jesus of Nazareth	
1979	Jesus	
1979	Joni	
1979	Monty Python's Life of Brian	
1980	The Blues Brothers	
1980	The Last Flight of Noah's Ark	
1982	Himala	
1986	Saving Grace	
1986	The Mission	
1987	Divine Mercy: No Escape	
1988	Nakausap Ko ang Birhen	
1988	Lorenzo Ruiz... The Saint... A Filipino	
1988	The Last Temptation of Christ	
1988	The Seventh Sign	
1989	Jesus of Montreal	
1989	The Mahabharata	
1989	Romero	
1990	China Cry	
1990	The Exorcist III	
1991	The Black Robe	
1992	Leap of Faith	
1993	Divine Mercy: Sa Buhay ni Sister Faustina	
1993	Little Buddha	
1993	Schindler's List	
1994	Jacob	
1994	Priest	
1995	Dead Man Walking	
1996	The Hunchback of Notre Dame	
1996	Kristo	
1997	The Apostle	
1997	Kundun	
1997	Ramayanam	
1997	Solomon	
1998	Ama Namin	
1998	Noah	
1998	Life is Beautiful	
1998	The Prince of Egypt	
1999	End of Days	
1999	The Messenger: The Story of Joan of Arc	
1999	The Omega Code	
1999	Joan of Arc	
2000	Islam: Empire of Faith	
2000– present	Left Behind (series)	
2001	Escape from Hell	
2001	Megiddo: The Omega Code 2	
2002	The Magdalene Sisters	
2002	Jonah: A VeggieTales Movie	
2002	Time Changer	
2002	Eight Crazy Nights	
2003	Bruce Almighty	
2003	Conspiracy of Silence	
2003	Flywheel	
2003	Luther	
2004	Exorcist: The Beginning	
2004	The Legend of Buddha	
2004	The Passion of the Christ	
2005	Constantine	
2005	Dominion: Prequel to the Exorcist	
2005	Our Fathers	
2005	The Gospel	
2006	Deliver Us from Evil	
2006	Facing the Giants	
2006	Faith Like Potatoes	
2006	One Night with the King	
2006	The Second Chance	
2006	Unidentified	
2007	Evan Almighty	
2007	Gabriel	
2007	Noelle	
2007	Noah's Ark	
2007	Saint Mary	
2007	The Ten Commandments	
2008	Abraham: The Friend of God	
2008	Doubt	
2008	Fireproof	
2008	Sunday School Musical	
2009	The Secrets of Jonathan Sperry	
2010	Like Dandelion Dust	
2010	Preacher's Kid	
2010	The Book of Eli	
2010	The Kingdom of Solomon	
2011	Young Abraham	
2011	?	
2011	Courageous	
2011	The Tree of Life (film)	
2011	Ikaw ang Pag-ibig	
2012	Joyful Noise	
2012	Krishna Aur Kans	
2013	Avalokitesvara	
2013	Home Run	
2013	Horns	
2013	Mahabharat	
2013	Pedro Calungsod: Batang Martir	
2014– present	God's Not Dead (series)	
2014	Stations of the Cross	
2014	Son of God	
2014	Noah	
2014	A Promise	
2014	Old Fashioned	
2015	Do You Believe?	
2015	Muhammad: The Messenger of God	
2015	Nanak Shah Fakir	
2015	The Path of Zarathustra	
2016	Ignacio de Loyola	
2016	Joseph & Mary	
2016	Miracles from Heaven	
2016	Silence	
2017	The Star	
2018	Come Sunday	
2018	Divine Beauty	
2018	I Can Only Imagine	
2018	Mary Magdalene	
2018	Paul, Apostle of Christ	
2018	The Nun	
2019	Breakthrough	
2019	A Hidden Life	
2020	Fatima	
2021	The Lady of Heaven	
2021	Man of God	
2022	Pieces	
2022	Why the Nativity?	
2023	The Nun II	
2023	The Exorcist: Believer	
2024	Heretic	
2025	Moses the Kalimullah: At Dawn	
2025	The King of Kings	
2025	The Last Supper	
2025	Light of the World	
2025	The Testament of Ann Lee	
2025	David	
2026	Ramayana: Part 1	
2026	Daniel and the Fiery Furnace	
TBA	The Way of the Wind	

== List of highest-grossing religious films ==
Following is a list of highest-grossing religious films. Grosses presented here are worldwide box office receipts. Warner Bros. is the most prominent distributor on this list, having nine entries total. The Exorcist series has the most films listed, with five in total. The Passion of the Christ has maintained the title of the highest-grossing religious film and highest-grossing independent film since its release in 2004. 2014 is the most prominent year, with five films on this list being released that year. Christian is the most frequent religion with 13 films on the list.

Christmas films are not included as they have their own list -- see List of highest-grossing Christmas films.

Rank	Title	Distributor	Worldwide Box Office	Year	Religion	References
1	The Passion of the Christ	Icon Productions	$622,313,635	2004	Christian	
2	Bruce Almighty	Universal Pictures	$484,592,874	2003		
3	The Exorcist	Warner Bros.	$430,872,776	1973		
4	The Nun	Warner Bros. Pictures	$366,050,119	2018	Roman Catholicism	
5	Noah	Paramount Pictures	$359,200,044	2014		
6	The Hunchback of Notre Dame	Walt Disney Pictures	$325,338,851	1996	Roman Catholicism	
7	The Nun II	Warner Bros. Pictures	$269,670,590	2023	Roman Catholicism	
8	Exodus: Gods and Kings	20th Century Fox	$268,175,631	2014		
9	Sound of Freedom	Angel Studios	$250,737,802	2023		
10	Constantine	Warner Bros.	$230,884,728	2005		
11	The Prince of Egypt	DreamWorks Pictures	$218,613,188	1998	Judaism, Old Testament of Christianity.	
12	Evan Almighty	Universal Pictures	$174,440,724	2007		
13	Ben-Hur	Metro-Goldwyn-Mayer	$146,900,000	1959		
14	The Exorcist: Believer	Universal Pictures	$137,055,039	2023		
15	The Ten Commandments	Paramount Pictures	$122,700,000	1956		
16	The Blues Brothers	Universal Pictures	$115,229,890	1980		
17	Heaven Is for Real	Sony Pictures	$101,888,019	2014	Christian	
18	The Shack	Lionsgate Films	$96,942,115	2017	Christian	
19	Ben-Hur	Paramount Pictures	$94,061,311	2016	Christian	
20	David	Angel Studios	$90,892,556	2025	Christian	
21	I Can Only Imagine	Roadside Attractions	$86,086,881	2018	Christian	
22	The King of Kings	Angel Studios	$83,612,781	2025	Christian	
23	Exorcist: The Beginning	Warner Bros.	$78,110,021	2004		
24	War Room	Sony Pictures	$73,989,734	2015	Christian	
25	Miracles from Heaven	Sony Pictures	$73,983,003	2016	Christian	
26	Son of God	20th Century Fox	$70,949,793	2014	Christian	
27	God's Not Dead	Freestyle Releasing	$64,667,874	2014	Christian	
28	The Star	Sony Pictures	$62,812,974	2017	Christian	
29	Heretic	A24	$60,040,465	2024	Christian	
30	Jesus Revolution	Lionsgate Films	$54,293,684	2023		
31	Doubt	Miramax	$51,699,984	2008		
32	Oh, God!	Warner Bros.	$51,061,196	1977		
33	Breakthrough	20th Century Fox	$50,444,358	2019		
34	Risen	Sony Pictures	$46,432,579	2016		
35	The Nativity Story	New Line Cinema	$46,432,264	2006		
36	The Forge	Sony Pictures	$40,395,051	2024		
37	The Exorcist III	20th Century Fox	$39,024,251	1990		
38	Overcomer	Affirm Films	$38,026,103	2019		
39	The Robe	20th Century Fox	$36,011,093	1956		
40	The Bible: In the Beginning...	20th Century Fox	$34,903,530	1966		
41	Fireproof	Samuel Goldwyn Films; Affirm Films	$33,473,297	2008		
42	Joyful Noise	Warner Bros.	$31,158,113	2012		
43	Exorcist II: The Heretic	Warner Bros.	$30,749,142	1977		
44	Left Behind	Freestyle Releasing	$27,405,896	2014		
45	Paul, Apostle of Christ	Sony Pictures	$26,078,500	2018		
46	Jonah: A VeggieTales Movie	Artisan Entertainment	$25,621,297	2002	Christian	
47	God's Not Dead 2	Pure Flix Entertainment	$24,487,848	2026		
48	Eight Crazy Nights	Sony Pictures	$23,833,131	2002	Judasim	
49	Leap of Faith	Paramount Pictures	$23,369,283	1992		
50	Oh, God! You Devil	Warner Bros.	$21,538,850	1984		

== See also ==
- List of Christian films
- List of Islam-related films
- List of films based on the Bible
