= Film industry in Georgia (U.S. state) =

Overview of the film industry in the U.S. state of Georgia

The film industry in Georgia is the largest among the states of the United States for production of feature films by number of films produced, as of 2016. Atlanta is the center of the film industry in Georgia with Turner, Tyler Perry, and Cinespace studios located there.

The industry in Georgia was boosted substantially by tax incentives introduced in 2002 and strengthened in 2008. Just in the fiscal year 2017 film and TV production had an economic impact in Georgia of $9.5 billion, while industry sources claim that the tax subsidy costs the state $141 million (2010). Films shot in Georgia include Tyler Perry's Meet the Browns (2008), Life as We Know It (2010), Contagion (2011) and a number of Marvel Studios productions, including Avengers: Infinity War and Avengers: Endgame, as well as Ant-Man and the Wasp and Black Panther. Georgia has since been called the "Hollywood of the South".

The industry is currently navigating a sharp downturn that began in 2023. Production spending plummeted from a record peak of $4.4 billion in 2022 to just $2.3 billion in fiscal year 2025.

== Ranking ==
Georgia overtook California in 2016 as the state location with the most feature films produced overall, 17 of the top 100 grossing movies were filmed in Georgia. Films in the state helped reach an economic impact of $9.5 billion in fiscal 2017 and $2.7 billion in direct spending.

== Incentive ==
The state's first tax incentive, a point of purchase sales and use tax exemption, was introduced in 2002. The state's second and most progressive tax incentive, the Georgia Entertainment Industry Investment Act, was signed into law in May 2005 and updated in May 2008. The act granted qualified productions a transferable income tax credit of 20% of all in-state costs for film and television investments of $500,000 or more. It is available to both traditional motion picture projects such as feature films, television series, commercials, and music videos, as well as new industries such as game development and animation.

An additional 10% tax credit was awarded to approved projects that embed a Georgia Entertainment Promotional logo within the titles or credits of each production. This vanity card, usually seen in closing credits, is rendered as an image of the Georgia Department of Economic Development's peach logo, a link to the GDEC's filming-specific tourism website, and a male voice saying or a woman singing "Made in Georgia".

In 2005 Georgia spent $10.3 million on its film incentive. That amount increased to $140.6 million by 2010. By the fiscal year 2015, the amount spent by Georgia in issued tax credits for the year was just over $504 million.

== Impact on economy ==
The Georgia Film, Music & Digital Entertainment Office states that more than 700 feature films, TV movies, TV series, single episodes, and pilots have been produced in Georgia since 1972. In the fiscal year 2017 film and TV production had an economic impact in Georgia of $9.5 billion.

According to the Georgia Department of Economic Development:

- There are more than 5,000 individual technicians and other workers in Georgia (Atlanta)
- The average number of local employees on a medium budget feature film is about 150-175
- On a larger budget production, there are about 200-250 local employees
- The average feature film budget is 41.7 million dollars
- The average amount (below-the-line) of feature film budget spent in a state is 60% - 70%, higher for locally produced projects.

== Facilities ==
Atlanta has become a center for film and television production and counts the presence of Pinewood Studios; since 2008 the Tyler Perry Studios in Southwest Atlanta; and since 2010 the Cinespace Film Studios soundstages in Lakewood Heights, south Atlanta, and to a limited extent, the facilities of Georgia Public Broadcasting, where the first season of Swift Justice with Nancy Grace was taped using state tax credits. Both films and many popular TV shows such as The Real Housewives of Atlanta, Tyler Perry's series, and Family Feud (from 2011 to 2017) are produced in Atlanta, while Floyd County Productions's FXX animated series Archer and several Adult Swim animated series are also produced under GEDC tax credits. In 2014, Trilith Studios (then called Pinewood Atlanta Studios) opened a large studio in Fayette County, Georgia. Films such as Ant Man and Captain America: Civil War have been shot at the studio.

== Productions in Georgia ==
There were 348 productions shot in the state in 2009. These industry establishments are probably supported wholly or in part by the production of feature films; television movies, series, pilots and miniseries; commercials, music videos, documentaries and still shoots.

In the fall of 2019, Tyler Perry opened Tyler Perry Studios on the site of pre-Civil War muster grounds, temporary Confederate Army barracks, and from 1866-2011 US Army Ft. McPherson. Since then, the facility has been used to shoot several big-budget films.

=== Films shot in Metro Atlanta ===
Films shot in Atlanta include Little Darlings (1980), Sharky's Machine (1981), Driving Miss Daisy (1989), Outbreak (1995), Remember the Titans (2000), Tyler Perry's Meet the Browns (2008), Life as We Know It (2010), Contagion (2011), Identity Thief (2013), Captain America: Civil War (2016), Baby Driver (2017), and Spider-Man: Homecoming (2017).

Covington in Metro Atlanta has been home to dozens of feature and television projects that include the hit TV series The Vampire Diaries and In the Heat of the Night. Although many types of films are shot in Atlanta, the New York Times in 2011 recognized the particular concentration of horror and zombie-themed productions in the city. A film about the historical 1956 Sugar Bowl event in Atlanta was announced in 2022.

=== Films shot outside Metro Atlanta ===
Besides Metro Atlanta, cities and towns frequently used to shoot in include:

- Crawfordville has been host to more than 8 feature films and television movies including Get Low, Sweet Home Alabama, The Neon Bible, Stars and Bars and Coward of the County.
- Savannah has been host to dozens of feature film and television projects that include: The Last Song, The Conspirator, The Legend of Bagger Vance, Forrest Gump, The Gift, Glory, Forces of Nature, The General’s Daughter, and The SpongeBob Movie: Sponge Out of Water.
- Columbus hosted The Fighting Temptations as well as We Were Soldiers, Survive the Night, and The Green Berets
- Rome hosted Sweet Home Alabama, as well as Remember the Titans, The Mule and Black Widow.
- Americus was host to the TV movie To Dance with the White Dog.
- The small town of Juliette was revitalized when Fried Green Tomatoes was largely shot there.
- Sherwood Pictures produced the Christian theme films Flywheel, Facing the Giants, Fireproof and Courageous, all filmed in and around Albany.
- The amusement park scenes of the post-apocalyptic zombie comedy Zombieland were filmed at Wild Adventures theme park in Valdosta.

=== Television ===
- Atlanta is filmed in locations around Atlanta.
- The Walking Dead is shot almost entirely in Georgia. The first season used many locations in and around Atlanta, and subsequent seasons have moved to a 120 acres (0.49 km^{2}) lot outside of Senoia and additional locations nearby.
- Stranger Things was principally filmed in Jackson as a stand-in for the fictional Hawkins, Indiana, with other nearby areas serving as other sets.
- A number of Adult Swim series, such as Lazor Wulf, Aqua Teen Hunger Force, Squidbillies, Your Pretty Face Is Going to Hell and season 3 of Smiling Friends are produced out of Atlanta; the FXX animated series Archer is also produced in Atlanta.

== 2019 Georgia film boycott ==
In 2019 Hollywood production companies, including Disney and Netflix, threatened to leave the state in response to Georgia's controversial heartbeat bill. In May 2019, a number of Hollywood studios and broadcasters including WarnerMedia, Viacom, CBS, NBC and Sony issued statements saying they would be reviewing their investments in the state if the new heartbeat bill were implemented.

== 2023 Downturn ==
Several factors that contributed to the decline. The 2023 Writers Guild of America strike and 2023 SAG-AFTRA strike halted almost all projects except reality TV for months, causing a significant loss of momentum. A huge loss was Disney’s Marvel Studios who left after Thunderbolts (2025) and sent massive productions to the United Kingdom to cut labor and production costs. Major streaming services like Netflix have increasingly moved productions overseas. Simultaneously, other states like California, Texas, and New York have significantly increased their own tax incentives to compete directly with Georgia. Multiple mergers including Paramount and Skydance plus Disney and Hulu led to a reduction in the quantity of shows produced by streamers have led to fewer overall projects.

Film permits in Atlanta dropped by roughly 50% between June 2023 and July 2024. Veteran crew members and local vendors, particularly Black creatives who found significant opportunities during the boom, have faced long gaps between projects. Large facilities like Trilith Live are diversifying into live concerts, comedy shows, and family events to remain sustainable during this period. To encourage a turnaround, the state will offer incentives starting January 1, 2026. Georgia will reinstate a post-production tax credit through HB129, offering up to a 30% credit for editing and sound work done in the state.

After hitting a peak of $4.4 billion in 2022, film and TV production spending dropped to $2.3 billion in fiscal year 2025. The state also went from 412 projects in 2022 to 245 in fiscal year 2025.
