= Kendrick Brothers =

American film production company

- Industry: Film
- Founded: 2013
- Headquarters: Albany, Georgia, United States
- Key people: Alex Kendrick, Stephen Kendrick, Shannon Kendrick
- Website: kendrickbrothers.com

Kendrick Brothers is an American independent Evangelical Christian film production company in Albany, Georgia, United States.

== History ==
Kendrick Brothers was founded in 2013 in Albany, Georgia by Alex Kendrick, Stephen Kendrick and Shannon Kendrick, filmmakers of Sherwood Pictures. After releasing several increasingly successful faith-based movies with Sherwood Pictures including Flywheel, Facing the Giants, Fireproof, and Courageous, Kendrick Brothers was formed as a production company to "step beyond Sherwood and expand their filmmaking ministry" with the new company subsequently releasing War Room, Overcomer, Show Me the Father, Courageous Legacy, Lifemark, The Forge and Flywheel: Ignition of the Soul.
