= Affirm Films =

American faith-based film studio

- Type: Subsidiary
- Industry: Film; Television
- Genre: Evangelical Christian; Drama; Kids and family (starting with The Star); Biblical (starting with Risen); Horror and thriller (starting with The Remaining)
- Founded: 2007; 19 years ago
- Headquarters: 10202 West Washington Boulevard. Stage #6-513; Culver City, California, U.S.
- Area served: Worldwide
- Key people: Rich Peluso (EVP); Tana Evans (SVP of Marketing and Distribution); Josh Nadler (Director of Development)
- Products: Motion pictures
- Number of employees: 28
- Parent: Sony Pictures Worldwide Acquisitions
- Divisions: Affirm Television
- Subsidiaries: Great American Pure Flix (co-ownership with Great American Media)
- Website: www.affirmfilms.com

Affirm Films is an American independent Christian film studio producing, marketing, and acquiring faith-based films. A subsidiary of Sony Pictures Worldwide Acquisitions, the studio's highest-grossing faith-based dramas are Miracles from Heaven and War Room. Its films have collectively grossed over $577 million in worldwide box office receipts.

== Filmography ==
Following is a list of films produced and distributed by Affirm Films.

Film No.	Title	Release date	Budget	Box office	References
1	Fireproof	September 26, 2008	$500,000	$33.5 million	
2	Hachi: A Dog's Tale	2010	$16 million	$46.7 million	
3	The Grace Card	February 25, 2011	$200,000	$2.4 million	
4	Soul Surfer	April 8, 2011	$18 million	$47.1 million	
5	Courageous	September 30, 2011	$2 million	$35.2 million	
6	Moms' Night Out	May 9, 2014	$5 million	$10.5 million	
7	When the Game Stands Tall	August 22, 2014	$15 million	$30.1 million	
8	The Remaining	September 5, 2014	n/a	$2.3 million	
9	War Room	August 28, 2015	$3 million	$74 million	
10	Risen	February 19, 2016	$20 million	$46.3 million	
11	Miracles from Heaven	March 16, 2016	$13 million	$73.8 million	
12	All Saints	August 25, 2017	$2 million	$5.9 million	
13	The Star	November 17, 2017	$20 million	$62.8 million	
14	Paul, Apostle of Christ	March 23, 2018	$5 million	$25.5 million	
15	Overcomer	August 23, 2019	$5 million	$37.9 million	
16	Show Me the Father	September 10, 2021	n/a	$1.9 million	
17	Big George Foreman	April 28, 2023	$32 million	$3.7 million	
18	Journey to Bethlehem	November 10, 2023	$6 million	$7.8 million	
19	The Forge	August 23, 2024	$5 million	$40.2 million	
20	Soul on Fire	October 10, 2025		$7 million	
21	Flywheel: Ignition of the Soul	October 16, 2026			
TOTALS			$131 million	$577.8 million	

== See also ==
- Gener8Xion Entertainment
- Pinnacle Peak Pictures
- Provident Films
- Kingdom Studios
- Called Higher Studios
- Five & Two Pictures
- Fox Faith
- Hope Studios
- Kendrick Brothers
- Lightworkers Media
- Miracle Channel
- Reverence Gospel Media
- Sherwood Pictures
- Great American Media
