= October Baby =

- Theatrical release poster
- Directed by: The Erwin Brothers
- Screenplay by: Cecil Stokes; Jon Erwin
- Story by: Cecil Stokes; Jon Erwin; Andrew Erwin
- Produced by: Dan Atchison; Justin Tolley; Jon Erwin; Andy Erwin
- Starring: Rachel Hendrix; Jason Burkey; Jasmine Guy; John Schneider
- Cinematography: Jon Erwin
- Edited by: Andrew Erwin
- Music by: Paul Mills
- Production companies: Gravitas; Provident Films
- Distributed by: Provident Films; Samuel Goldwyn Films
- Release date: October 28, 2011
- Running time: 107 minutes
- Country: United States
- Language: English
- Budget: $1 million
- Box office: $5.3 million

October Baby is a 2011 American Christian-themed drama film directed by Andrew Erwin and Jon Erwin and starring Rachel Hendrix in her film debut. It is the story of a woman named Hannah, who learns as a young adult that she survived a failed abortion attempt. She then embarks upon a road trip to understand the circumstances of her birth. October Baby was inspired by a YouTube video chronicling the life experiences of Gianna Jessen, who was born after a failed abortion attempt.

== Plot ==
Hannah is a 19-year-old college freshman with epilepsy, asthma, and depression. On the verge of her theatrical debut in a university play, she collapses on stage. Hannah meets with her parents and a doctor, who quotes passages from her journal that she has been feeling lost and unwanted. She learns that she is adopted and her biological mother tried to abort her.

Hannah seeks out her best friend, Jason, for advice. After sorting through her feelings and her options with Jason, she decides to find her birth mother. Jason invites her to go on a trip to New Orleans, Louisiana with a group of his friends for spring break. Hannah's father, Jacob Lawson, is reluctant to let her go, because of her illness. Hannah decides to go because she says she wants answers. She sets out on a journey that leads her to her birthplace, Mobile, Alabama. Jason helps her find the hospital where she was born, but it is vacant and locked up. Hannah pries the back door open and they are arrested. The sheriff lets them go when she tells him her reason for trying to get in. He gives her the name and address of the nurse who signed her birth certificate. She locates the nurse, who assisted in the abortion, and they have an emotional encounter while the nurse describes the circumstances behind not only her birth, but that of her twin brother, whom Hannah knew nothing about. She leaves the nurse's apartment with the changed name and workplace of her birth mother.

When she finally meets her biological mother, she is overwhelmed by anger and hatred because of her mother's rejection. Her father arrives to take her home, having found out she lied to him about being with others beside Jason, and about checking in with her doctor. He discovers their arrest for breaking and entering and tells Jason he is not permitted to interact with Hannah. Jason returns to the hotel where his friends are staying. He breaks up with his girlfriend, Alanna, and returns home. He phones Hannah's father and apologizes for lying.

Hannah's adoptive parents go through their own pain and suffering, deciding to tell Hannah the details of their choice to adopt both her and her brother, who died months later. Her adoptive mother had been pregnant with twins and lost them at 24 weeks. They saw an adoption request for Hannah and her brother at a crisis pregnancy center where she had volunteered.

Hannah wanders aimlessly until she sees a Catholic Church and goes in. She seeks consolation from a priest. Hannah experiences an epiphany and finds she is able to forgive her biological mother and forget about the botched abortion.

Jason takes Hannah back to the theater where she had collapsed and says they should finish the play together. Hannah realizes he wants to be more than a friend and starts to fall in love. The movie ends with them leaving to go to their college dorms. Hannah hugs both her parents and thanks them for wanting her when no one else did. She is seen smiling at her father and holding Jason's hand.

== Cast ==
- Rachel Hendrix as Hannah Lawson
- Jason Burkey as Jason Bradley
- John Schneider as Dr. Jacob Lawson
- Jasmine Guy as Nurse Mary Rutledge
- Robert Amaya as Beach Cop
- Maria Atchison as Secretary Pat
- Joy Brunson as Danielle
- Rodney Clark as Priest
- Brian Gall as Rent-a-Cop
- Carl Maguire as Lance
- Tracy Miller as Officer Mitchell
- Lance E. Nichols as Doctor Stewart
- Jennifer Price as Grace Lawson
- Shari Rigby as Cindy Hastings (as Shari Wiedmann)
- Don Sandley as Psychiatrist
- Chris Sligh as B-Mac
- Austin Johnson as Truman
- Colleen Trusler as Alanna

== Production and release ==
At a preview of the film at The Heritage Foundation, director Jon Erwin stated that prior to making the film he "never knew there was such a thing as an abortion survivor." He decided to make the film after Christian filmmaker Alex Kendrick challenged him: "What is your purpose?"

October Baby had a limited release on October 28, 2011, in the states of Alabama and Mississippi and the city of Memphis. One reason a limited release was favored over a wide release was to highlight an upcoming ballot initiative, Measure 25, a Mississippi personhood amendment to determine if life begins at conception (the initiative failed). The U.S. national release was scheduled for March 23, 2012 in approximately 360 theatres. The Hunger Games was expected to release at the same time on ten times as many screens. When asked how the film would fare against this daunting competition, Rachel Hendrix said, "there will be all these teenage girls waiting in line to see 'Hunger Games,' and they'll see the poster for 'October Baby,' and they'll want to go see our movie, too."

The film, which was released by the Samuel Goldwyn Co., was expected to expand into 200 or more new locations on April 13. "And the good news is that we have retained all of our theaters" from the first weekend, said Meyer Gottlieb, Goldwyn's president. It was subsequently released on DVD on September 11, 2012. Eric Wilson wrote a novel based on the film, which was released in September 2012.

== Reception ==
The film received poor reviews from critics, scoring a 26% favorable rating on Rotten Tomatoes based on 39 reviews and an average rating of 4.60/10. On Metacritic, the film holds a weighted average rating of 32 out of 100 based on 14 critical reviews, indicating "generally unfavorable reviews".

However, it found some praise within the media. Gary Goldstein in the Los Angeles Times wrote that October Baby is "a film whose poignancy is hard to deny whatever side of the abortion debate you fall on." While he found fault with the script, he praised Jasmine Guy's performance, saying she was "superb in one beautifully wrought scene as the ex-abortion clinic nurse who later witnessed Hannah's birth." Roger Ebert also praised Guy's performance, but overall found the film wanting. He rated it 2 out of 4 stars, writing: "the film as a whole is amateurish and ungainly, can't find a consistent tone, is too long [...] and is photographed with too many beauty shots that slow the progress." Allison Willmore in The A.V. Club described the film as a "virulent pro-life tract" and "revenge fantasy" that, rather than being a film, is "propaganda for the already converted." She particularly criticized the film's medical claims, saying that it depicted late-term abortion and poor conditions in abortion clinics as the norm.

The film's anti-abortion message was received well by anti-abortion organizations. Endorsements include Ron Anger, Alex Kendrick, Stephen Kendrick, Dennis Rainey, Richard Land, Ted Baehr and Charmaine Yoest. Joni Hannihan of the Florida Baptist Witness wrote, "the movie sends strong messages about the beauty of life, the importance of each life—but it's not preachy" and found the film "young" and "refreshing." World magazine observed that the film is "polished" and "a more-than-worthy viewing experience." However, the romance between Hannah and Jason was found to be lacking in depth and one of the characters on the road trip unbelievable. But the highlight of the film was portraying "how liberating and joyous forgiveness is—both giving it and receiving it—without putting implausible, sermonizing dialogue into their characters' mouths."

The October Baby filmmakers believe the gulf between the reviewer and the ticket buyer scores dramatizes a rift between critics and conservative moviegoers. "What it tells me is that there's a gap in values", Jon Erwin said. "There's a large group of people who don't see their values reflected in most movies." In selecting the film for its "Worst of films of 2012" list, staff of The A.V. Club explained that "what makes the film so insidious and upsetting is the way in which it's understood that the reluctant birth mother deserves what she gets" and "It's a cinematic encapsulation of a worldview in which a woman's rights are widely understood to be secondary to those of her offspring, both in the womb and years later."

== Awards ==
The film won the Grand Jury Prize as the Best Fiction Feature at the 2011 Red Rock Film Festival. At the festival Rachel Hendrix won the Special Achievement Award for Acting.
