= Rob Whitehurst =

American production sound mixer and audio engineer (born 1951)

- Born: Robert Whitehurst; November 14, 1951 (age 74); Tampa, Florida, US
- Education: Bachelor's degree
- Alma mater: University of South Florida
- Occupation: Production sound mixer
- Years active: 1986–2011

Rob Whitehurst (born November 14, 1951) is an American production sound mixer and audio engineer.

== Biography ==
Born in Tampa, Florida, on November 14, 1951, Whitehurst was a prominent sound mixer in the film and television industry.

Since 1990, he has worked on television shows such as American Idol, Extreme Makeover: Home Edition, The Biggest Loser, Dr. Phil, Cops, 60 Minutes, The Tonight Show with Jay Leno, Hard Knocks and Full Contact (NFL Films productions) and numerous movies and documentaries including the Christian independent films Facing the Giants, Fireproof, Letters to God, The Glass Window and Courageous.

== Filmography ==
Production Sound Mixer
Year	Film	Genre	Other notes
2011	Courageous		
2011	The Glass Window		TV
2010	Letters to God		
2009	Street Dreams		Additional sound
2008	Fireproof		
2007	Unstrung	Theatrical documentary	
2006	Facing the Giants		
2003	Citizen Verdict		2nd Unit
2002	Stone Reader	Documentary	
2001	Rocks With Wings	Documentary	
2001	The Profit		
2001	Gibtown	Documentary	Additional sound
1999	Free A Man To Fight		
1998	Making Waves		
1996	The Magic of Flight	IMAX	
1995	Stormchasers	IMAX	
1993	Thunder In Paradise		2nd Unit

== Sound Mixer - Television ==
- 20/20 (ABC News)
- 20th Century with Mike Wallace (CBS News)
- 48 Hours (CBS News)
- 60 Minutes (CBS News)
- 999 (BBC)
- A Current Affair
- ABC's Wide World of Sports (ABC Sports)
- American Idol (FOX)
- American Masters (PBS)
- America's Most Wanted (FOX)
- Apprentice, The: Martha Stewart (NBC)
- Arrest & Trial (USA)
- Best Damn Sports Show Period, The (FOX Sports)
- Biggest Loser, The (NBC)
- Body of Evidence (truTV)
- Bonkers (Disney)
- CBS Evening News (CBS News)
- Comedy Central Presents (Comedy Central)
- COPS (FOX/Spike)
- Dateline NBC (NBC News)
- Day Of The Shark (Discovery)
- Dr. Phil (CBS)
- Entertainment Tonight
- Extra (NBC)
- Extreme Makeover (ABC)
- Extreme Makeover: Home Edition (ABC)
- Forensic Files (Court TV)
- FOX News (FOX News)
- FOX NFL Sunday (FOX)
- Frontline (PBS)
- Ghost Stories (Travel Channel)
- Glenn Miller: America's Musical Hero (PBS)
- Good Morning America (ABC News)
- Hard Copy (CBS)
- Hard Knocks (HBO)
- I, Detective (Court TV)
- Inside Edition
- Inside the NFL (HBO Sports)
- Jack Hanna's Animal Adventures
- Jeff Corwin Unleashed (Discovery)
- LIVE! with Regis and Kathie Lee (ABC)
- Medical Detectives (TLC)
- MSNBC Live (MSNBC)
- MTV Rock 'N' Jock Basketball VI (MTV)
- MTV Sports (MTV)
- National Geographic Explorer (TBS)
- Nature (PBS)
- NBC Nightly News (NBC News)
- New Detectives, The (Discovery)
- News On CNBC, The (CNBC)
- NFL Full Contact (truTV)
- NFL Presents (NFL Network)
- Nova (PBS)
- Oprah Winfrey Show, The
- Real Sports with Bryant Gumbel (HBO Sports)
- Scientific American Frontiers with Alan Alda (PBS)
- Sunday Morning (CBS News)
- Super Bowl XXXV (CBS)
- Super Bowl XLIII (Disney MVP)
- This Week In Baseball (FOX Sports)
- Today Show, The (NBC)
- Tonight Show with Jay Leno (NBC)
- Under The Helmet (FOX Sports)
- World News Tonight (ABC News)
