= 2020 Movieguide Awards =

Annual American movie and television awards

The 2020 Movieguide Awards ceremony honored the best films and television of 2019.

== Winners and nominees ==
Winners are listed first, highlighted in boldface, and indicated with a double dagger (‡).

**Epiphany Prize for Most Inspiring Movie** - Honoring movies that are wholesome, spiritually uplifting and inspirational	**Epiphany Prize for Most Inspiring TV Program**
**Overcomer**‡; A Beautiful Day in the Neighborhood; Breakthrough; Harriet; A Hidden Life	**Christmas Wishes & Mistletoe Kisses**‡; The Chosen: Episode 8: "I Am He"; A Christmas Love Story; Christmas Town; The Crown: Episode 3.7: "Moondust"; Dolly Parton's Heartstrings: Episode 8: "These Old Bones"; Jesus: His Life: Episode 1: "Joseph: The Nativity"; Last Man Standing: Episode 7.19: "The Passion of Paul"; When Calls the Heart: "Home for Christmas"
**Faith and Freedom Award for Movies** - Honoring movies that promote positive American values	**Faith and Freedom Award for TV**
**The Least of These: The Graham Staines Story**‡; 1917; Harriet; A Hidden Life; Unplanned	**Dolly Parton's Heartstrings: Episode 8: "These Old Bones"**‡; Country Music: Episode 8: "Don't Get Above Your Raisin'"; When Calls the Heart: "Home for Christmas"; The Crown: Episode 3.7: "Moondust"; Heartland: Episode 12.1: "Dare to Dream"
**Best Movie for Families**	**Best Movie for Mature Audiences**
**The Lego Movie 2: The Second Part**‡; Apollo 11; Breakthrough; Dumbo; How to Train Your Dragon: The Hidden World; The Least of These: The Graham Staines Story; The Lion King; Overcomer; The Pilgrim's Progress; Toy Story 4	**A Beautiful Day in the Neighborhood**‡; 1917; Ad Astra; Avengers: Endgame; Ford V Ferrari; Harriet; A Hidden Life; Little Women; Spider-Man: Far from Home; Unplanned
**Grace Award for Most Inspiring Performance for Movies**	**Grace Award for Most Inspiring Performance for TV**
**Aryn Wright-Thompson - Overcomer**‡; Alex Kendrick - Overcomer; Cameron Arnett - Overcomer; Tom Hanks - A Beautiful Day in the Neighborhood; Chrissy Metz - Breakthrough; Cynthia Erivo - Harriet; Ashley Bratcher - Unplanned	**Jonathan Roumie - The Chosen: Episode 8: "I Am He"**‡; Jill Wagner - Christmas Wishes & Mistletoe Kisses; Kathleen Turner - Dolly Parton's Heartstrings: Episode 8: "These Old Bones"; Candace Cameron Bure - Christmas Town; Tobias Menzies - The Crown: Episode 3.7: "Moondust"
**Genesis Award** - Promoting the blessings that the animal kingdom provides to humankind	
**A Puppy Christmas**‡; Heartland: Episode 12.1: "Dare to Dream"; Lady and the Tramp; Togo	
