= Letters to God =

- Theatrical release poster
- Directed by: David Nixon, Patrick Doughtie (co-director)
- Written by: Patrick Doughtie; Art D'Alessandro; Sandra Thrift; Cullen Douglas
- Produced by: David Nixon, Kim Dawson, Tom Swanson, Art D'Alessandro
- Starring: Robyn Lively; Jeffrey S.S. Johnson; Maree Cheatham; Tanner Maguire; Michael Christopher Bolten; Bailee Madison; Ralph Waite
- Cinematography: Bob Scott
- Edited by: Patrick Tyler
- Music by: Colin O'Malley
- Production company: Possibility Pictures
- Distributed by: Vivendi Entertainment
- Release date: April 9, 2010
- Running time: 110 minutes
- Country: United States
- Language: English
- Budget: $3 million
- Box office: $2.9 million

Letters to God is a 2010 American Christian drama film directed by David Nixon and starring Robyn Lively, Jeffrey Johnson, Tanner Maguire, Michael Bolten and Bailee Madison. The story was written by Patrick Doughtie about his son Tyler, with the screenplay penned by Doughtie, Art D'Alessandro, Sandra Thrift and Cullen Douglas. The story took place in Nashville, Tennessee, but the movie was filmed in Orlando, Florida.

Letters to God is based on the true story of Tyler Doughtie and his battle with cancer. In the film, this character is given the name Tyler Doherty and is played by Tanner Maguire. The film was released to theaters on April 9, 2010, with mixed reviews. Despite opening at #10 at the box office, it fell just $92,000 short of its $3 million budget with a final gross of $2.9 million.

== Plot ==
Tyler Doherty (Tanner Maguire) is an 8-year-old cancer patient with a strong faith in Jesus and a penchant for writing and sending letters to God. Since his father died, he lives with his mother and older brother, Ben. Brady McDaniels, the postman divorced who has temporarily taken the route that includes the Doherty family, is slowly drawn into the lives of the families on his route, especially the Dohertys. The film depicts the everyday lives of Tyler, his friends, neighbors and schoolmates, and shows the impact that Tyler's dedication to writing to God has on all those around him.

Tyler eventually succumbs to his illness and dies at home. Tyler's best friend, Samantha, dedicates a mailbox for letters to God, saying about Tyler that "his life was a letter to God."

== Cast ==
- Robyn Lively as Maddy Doherty
- Jeffrey Johnson as Brady McDaniels
- Tanner Maguire as Tyler Doherty
- Bailee Madison as Samantha "Sam" Perryfield
- Michael Bolten as Ben Doherty
- Maree Cheatham as Olivia
- Ralph Waite as Mr. Perryfield
- Brendan Doughtie as Justin McDaniels
- Karley Scott Collins as Ashley Turner

== Production ==
David Nixon (far left) and Pat Doughtie with young actors Tanner Maguire and Bailee Madison on the set

Pat Doughtie and his dying son, Tyler, became a major story in Nashville, Tennessee when Julie Buchanan was convicted of stealing money from the boy's cancer fund. In caring for his son, Doughtie lost his job and his house, and soon his son died as well. After his son's death, Doughtie decided to write a book, but he was unsure of where telling his son's story would lead. Doughtie took a screenplay class and soon wrote the original script for Letters to God. It was noticed by Christian filmmaker David Nixon, who co-produced Sherwood Pictures' successful Christian films Facing the Giants and Fireproof.

It was assumed that any story involving Tyler would include Julie Buchanan, who stole money from his cancer fund; however, Tyler's true-life cancer is instead fictionalized: an alcoholic mailman intercepts Tyler's letters to God. Doughtie wanted Letters to God to be shot in Nashville, but it was ultimately filmed in Orlando, Florida for financial reasons. David Nixon, Tom Swanson and Kim Dawson are leading a group of investors in the development of three faith-based movies through Possibility Pictures, the first being Letters to God. The film had a production budget of approximately $3 million.

=== Possibility Pictures ===
Logo of Possibility Pictures

Possibility Pictures is an Orlando-based Christian film production company, created by David Nixon, Kim Dawson (producer) and Tom Swanson (executive producer). Letters to God is their first production. The company is designed to be the "DreamWorks of faith-based movies."

== Release ==
Letters to God was released to theaters on April 9, 2010. Nixon said he hoped the film to run in theaters for three to four months, then for it to go to Blu-ray and DVD around July or August 2010. It was released on DVD August 10. The official trailer was released Christmas week, but Christianity Today was given early access to it. The filmmakers said Tim McGraw has agreed to show the movie trailer at 16 of his concerts because he lost a family member to cancer.

=== Box office ===
Letters to God released to theaters on April 9, 2010, in 897 theaters. It debuted #10 at the box office with $1,101,204.00 in its opening weekend. Similar to recent Christian film To Save a Life, Letters to God received strong box office results in smaller markets with a higher concentration of Christian moviegoers, including Charlotte, North Carolina, and Columbus, Ohio. Tracking for the film was highest among families and females. The film dropped 43% in its second weekend, $620,580, accumulating $2,020,830 in two weeks. It closed in June 2010 after grossing $2.85 million, falling just $150,000 short of its budget. Total domestic video sales have amounted to slightly over $6 million.

=== Reception ===
Letters to God received mixed reviews: generally negative from mainstream film critics and far more positive from Christian ones. On the review aggregator website Rotten Tomatoes, 26% of 23 critics' reviews are positive. The website's consensus reads: "Letters to God's heartwarming real-life story is lost in a heavy-handed drama that's too pat and oppressively earnest to effectively tug the heartstrings." Metacritic, which uses a weighted average, assigned the film a score of 31 out of 100, based on 7 critics, indicating "generally unfavorable" reviews.

John Beifuss of The Commercial Appeal called the film a "sometimes moving, sometimes awkward blend of sentimental family drama, childhood cancer education and Christian proselytizing". Roger Moore of the Orlando Sentinel gave the film 1½ out of 4 stars, "Letters to God is certainly family-friendly, [but] the blandness robs it of whatever emotion or redemption the filmmakers were shooting for." The NYC Movie Guru gave the film a positive review, "Letters to God manages to be a bighearted, uplifting and captivating drama for all ages. It will inspire you to open your heart compassionately and to find hope, faith and comfort throughout your life’s hardships."

The film was extremely well received by Christian film critics. The Dove Foundation gave the film five stars. Phil Boatwright of the Baptist Press called the film "A triumph. One of the best films you and your family will see all year." Ted Baehr of Movieguide said, "Letters to God is an impressive movie. It is extremely well written. The dialogue is edgy and drives the story forward. The production quality is first rate. There is even great attention to the music... the type of movie you want everyone to see, one of the most encouraging and inspiring movies in a long time." Plugged In (publication) said, "Letters to God actually goes well beyond the tried-and-true tale of a sweet kid who has cancer. It does so by adding the spiritual dimension."

=== Soundtrack ===
A CD featuring music from the movie and a song performed by Anne Marie Boskovich was released April 22, 2010. It has currently sold 3,000 copies.
