= Whitehurst =

Whitehurst may refer to:

People:

- Albert Whitehurst, English footballer
- Andrew Whitehurst, British visual effects artist
- Billy Whitehurst, English professional footballer during the 1980s
- Charlie Whitehurst, NFL quarterback
- David Whitehurst, professional American football player
- Agent M (Emily Grace Whitehurst), punk rock singer
- Frederic Whitehurst, FBI special agent
- G. William Whitehurst (George William Whitehurst) (1925–2026), professor and retired politician who served in the United States House of Representatives
- George William Whitehurst (judge) (1891–1974), United States federal judge
- Grover Whitehurst, director of the Institute of Education Sciences
- Jim Whitehurst, chief executive officer at Red Hat
- John Whitehurst, English clockmaker and scientist
- Logan Whitehurst, American musician
- Mickey Whitehurst, North Carolina State college football coach from 1907 to 1908
- Rob Whitehurst, American production sound mixer and audio engineer
- Steven Whitehurst, African American author, poet, and educator
- Wally Whitehurst (Walter Richard Whitehurst), former right-handed pitcher in Major League Baseball
- Walter Whitehurst, English footballer

Things:

- USS Whitehurst (DE-634), Buckley class destroyer escort of the United States Navy named in honor of Henry Purefoy Whitehurst
- Whitehurst Freeway, elevated highway over K Street and Water Street in the Georgetown neighborhood of Washington, D.C.
- William L. Whitehurst Field, county-owned, public-use airport
