= Eric Wilson (suspense writer) =

American author (born 1966)

- Born: November 23, 1966 (age 59); Oakland, California, U.S.
- Occupation: Author
- Writing career
- Genres: Mystery, supernatural suspense, nonfiction, memoir

Eric Wilson (born November 23, 1966) is a retired NY Times bestselling author, raised in Oregon, now living in Nashville, TN. He currently has 21 books in print: five supernatural thrillers, five mystery/suspense, five movie novelizations, and six works of nonfiction. His publishers range from Waterbrook Press (a division of Random House) to HarperCollins. His first book was published in 2004.

His works include Dark to Mortal Eyes, Expiration Date, The Best of Evil, and A Shred of Truth. The Best of Evil and A Shred of Truth are part of the Aramis Black mystery series. In addition, he has written a trilogy called "Jerusalem's Undead" which debuted with book one, Field of Blood, in 2008. It was followed by Haunt of Jackals in August 2009, and Valley of Bones in May 2010. It is an ultra-modern take on Peretti's This Present Darkness and C.S. Lewis' The Screwtape Letters.

Wilson is also the writer of five movie novelizations. The first two, Facing the Giants and Flywheel, had moderate success. However, the third novelization, Fireproof, earned him a spot on the New York Times bestseller list for 13 weeks. The fourth, October Baby, was released in 2012, and the fifth, Samson, came out in 2018.

Wilson released two suspense novels with Kingstone Media/Bay Forest Books, One Step Away and Two Seconds Late.

Wilson's nonfiction includes Taming the Beast: The Untold Story of Team Tyson, released in 2014, and in 2021, From Chains to Change, a memoir he co-wrote with Steven Allen Young, founder of Home Street Home Ministries. He has cowritten a book with Matt Bronleewe called What Are You Going To Do?: How One Simple Question Transformed Lives Around the World, released in January 2024, as well as one with his sister and brother called American Leftovers: Surviving Family, Religion, & the American Dream, released by Chalice Press in April 2023. Confessions of a Former Prosecutor, cowritten with Preston Shipp, was released in April 2024.

Wilson was born in California, and spent some childhood years in 23 countries as a missionary kid, then returned to Oregon, where he finished high school. He earned a bachelor's degree in biblical studies from Life Pacific University in San Dimas, California, though he now considers himself an ex-evangelical.

He and his wife, songwriter Carolyn Rose, have two grown daughters and two grandchildren.

== Works ==
Books

- Dark to Mortal Eyes (2004)
- Expiration Date (2005)
- The Best of Evil (2006)
- A Shred of Truth (2007)
- Facing the Giants (novelization; 2007)
- Flywheel (novelization; 2008)
- Fireproof (novelization; 2008)
- Field of Blood (Jerusalem's Undead Trilogy #1) (2008)
- Haunt of Jackals (Jerusalems's Undead Trilogy #2) (2009)
- Valley of Bones (Jerusalems's Undead Trilogy #3) (2010)
- One Step Away (By the Numbers #1) (2011)
- Two Seconds Late (By the Numbers #2) (2012)
- Three Fatal Blows (By the Numbers #3; cancelled)
- Amelia's Last Secret (June 2012)
- October Baby (novelization, with Theresa Preston; 2012)
- Alice Goes the Way of the Maya (2012)
- The Eagle's Nest (WWII thriller; cancelled)
- Taming the Beast: The Untold Story of Mike Tyson (co-writer Rory Holloway, 2014)
- Minutes Before Midnight (biography) (cancelled)
- Samson (novelization; 2018)
- From Chains to Change (nonfiction, co-writer Steven Allen Young, 2021)
- American Leftovers: Surviving Family, Religion, & the American Dream (co-writers, Heidi Wilson Messner and Shaun Paul Wilson, 2023)
- What Are You Going To Do?: The Inspiring Story of Everett Swanson and the Founding of Compassion International (co-writer, Matt Bronleewe, 2024)
- Confessions of a Former Prosecutor (co-writer, Preston Shipp, 2024)
