= The Love Dare =

2008 book by Alex and Stephen Kendrick

- Author: Alex Kendrick; Stephen Kendrick
- Genre: Marriage
- Publisher: B & H Publishing Group
- Publication date: 2008
- Pages: 224
- ISBN: 0-8054-4885-3

The Love Dare is a non-fiction marriage-related book written by Alex and Stephen Kendrick. It is a 40-day Christian devotional designed to strengthen marriages. Each daily devotion includes scripture, a statement of principle, the day's "dare," (such as "Resolve to say nothing negative to your spouse at all") and a journaling area and check box to chart progress. It is used in the storyline for the 2008 film, Fireproof, which is directed by author Alex Kendrick. For Valentine's Day, Day 1 and Day 2 of The Love Dare were published on the Baptist Press' website, with permission of B & H Publishing Group.

The Love Dare has sold over 3.5 million copies, with at least four million copies in print. It has spent over 130 weeks on The New York Times Paperback Advice & Misc. Best Seller list, and received the Platinum Award (more than 1 million sold) from the Evangelical Christian Publishers Association (EPCA) in April 2009. It has been translated into over 20 languages. Alex and Stephen Kendrick wrote a second book released fall 2009, "Love Dare Day by Day", a one-year devotional for couples.

== Charts ==
- #1 twice on the New York Times Best Seller list.
- #7 non-fiction on Amazon.ca (Canadian).
