= Show Me the Father =

- Theatrical release poster
- Directed by: Rick Altizer
- Produced by: Mark Miller
- Starring: Sherman Smith; Tony Evans; Stephen Kendrick; Alex Kendrick; Deland McCullough; Jim Daly; Eddie George
- Cinematography: John Melton
- Edited by: Mark Miller; Rick Altizer; Scott Simmonds; Bill Ebel
- Music by: Kyle McCuiston
- Production companies: Affirm Films; Kendrick Brothers
- Distributed by: Sony Pictures Releasing
- Release date: September 10, 2021
- Running time: 91 minutes
- Country: United States
- Language: English
- Box office: $1.9 million

Show Me the Father is a 2021 American Christian documentary film by director Rick Altizer, presenting five fatherhood-related stories connected with commentary by Tony Evans, produced by Mark Miller and executive produced by the Kendrick brothers. It is the Kendrick brothers' seventh film and their third through their subsidiary, Kendrick Brothers Productions. It was theatrically released on September 10, 2021.

== Plot ==
The film covers the fatherhood stories of good fathers, absent fathers, and abusive fathers. It also details the adoption of Stephen Kendrick's daughter from China, and the blessings that the Kendrick brothers' father Larry pronounced for them at each of their respective weddings.

== Cast ==
With the exception of Evans, who provides Christian, faith-based commentary on topics of fatherhood, adoption, and sonship, each person featured in the film relates their personal stories of experiencing fatherhood. While the five main stories focus on men, several of their mothers and wives also provide their perspectives on the events depicted, as does Larry Kendrick, Alex and Stephen's father.

== Theme ==
Quoted in The Christian Post, executive producer Stephen Kendrick said "We want people to learn how to relate to God as the perfect Father they've always wanted and longed for, but never had," he added. "The fatherhood of God was the design for God creating fatherhood on Earth. All the roles that dad is supposed to play on Earth come from God's roles in our lives."

== Production ==
Show Me the Father is the Kendrick brothers' seventh film and the third produced by their company, Kendrick Brothers. Their initial four films were created under Sherwood Pictures.

== Reception ==
=== Box office ===
Released on September 10, 2021, the film made $700,181 from 1,073 theaters in its opening weekend.

=== Critical response ===
The Christian Post positively reacted to the film. Writing for Crosswalk.com, Michael Foust said that "Show Me the Father isn't a boring documentary. Like the Kendricks Brothers' feature films, it inspires and convicts you – and leaves you reaching for the box of tissue." Reviewing for World Radio, Collin Garbario praised the film but suggested the filmmakers could have "broadened their interviews to include more perspectives on the importance of fathers. For example, we don't really get to hear about the legacy that a good or bad father can leave on a woman's life." Audiences polled by CinemaScore gave the film a rare average grade of "A+", the fourth consecutive top score for a Kendrick Brothers-produced film, while PostTrak reported 88% of audience members gave it a positive score, with 67% saying they would definitely recommend it.
