= Sherwood Pictures =

American independent Christian film production company

- Type: Ministry of Sherwood Baptist Church
- Industry: Film
- Founded: 2003
- Headquarters: Albany, Georgia, United States
- Website: SherwoodPictures.com

Sherwood Pictures is an American independent Christian film production company in Albany, Georgia, United States. It is unusual among production companies in that it is a ministry of a local church, Sherwood Baptist Church. The company uses mostly volunteers in their productions. It was founded in 2003 by Alex Kendrick, the associate pastor of media for Sherwood Baptist Church with $20,000 in donations.

The company's first film was Flywheel (2003), but it is best known for Facing the Giants (2006), Fireproof (2008), the highest-grossing independent film of the year, Courageous (2011), and Courageous Legacy (2021). The Kendrick Brothers have also produced War Room (2015), Overcomer (2019), Show Me the Father (2021), Lifemark (2022), and The Forge (2024) although they're not Sherwood Pictures films.

== History ==
Sherwood Pictures was founded in 2003 by Alex Kendrick, the associate pastor of media for Sherwood Baptist Church with $20,000 in donations. Kendrick has also written and directed each of Sherwood's films. The budget of each film has been significantly larger than the film directly previous, at $20,000 for Flywheel, $100,000 for Facing the Giants, $500,000 for Fireproof, $2 million for Courageous, $3 million for War Room, and $5 million for Overcomer.

Sherwood's films have earned back their budgets dozens of times over. Facing the Giants made 102 times its budget, Fireproof earned 67 times its budget, and Courageous made eight times its budget in its first ten days in theaters.

In 2011, The Hollywood Reporter wrote about Sherwood's increasing success:

The movies have progressed from amateurish to critical successes. 'The characters are complex and well drawn, struggling with various personal issues that test their faith and character in believable ways,' The Hollywood Reporter film reviewer Frank Scheck wrote of Courageous.

In 2013, Alex Kendrick and his two brothers left the Sherwood Pictures department to found the production company Kendrick Brothers.

== Filmography ==
- Flywheel (2003)
- Facing the Giants (2006)
- Fireproof (2008)
- Courageous (2011)
- Courageous Legacy (2021)

== Cast ==
Actor/Actress	Film			
Actor/Actress	Flywheel	Facing the Giants	Fireproof	Courageous
Alex Kendrick	Jay Austin	Grant Taylor	Pastor Strauss	Adam Mitchell
Kirk Cameron			Caleb Holt	
Shannen Fields	Miss Gardner	Brooke Taylor		
Erin Bethea		Alicia Houston	Catherine Holt	
Ken Bevel			Michael Simmons	Nathan Hayes
Tracy Goode	Bernie Myers	Brady Owens	Benny Murphy	
Jim McBride	Butch Bowers	Bobby Lee Duke	Carl Hatcher	Church Member
Jason McLeod		Brock Kelley	Eric Harmon	
Kevin Downes				Shane Fuller
Janet Lee Dapper	Judy Austin	School Teacher	Nurse	
Bailey Cave		David Childers	Ross	
Walter Burnett	Max Kendall	Stan Schulz	Dr. Anderson	
Carla Hawkins	Ms. Wright		Tina Simmons	
Renee Jewell	Winners Friend	Jackie		Victoria Mitchell
