= David Nixon (director) =

American film director and film producer

David Nixon is an American film director and film producer. He is the director and producer of Letters to God and a co-producer and assistant director of Fireproof and Facing the Giants. He is the creator of the film company Possibility Pictures and president of DNP Studios which has produced commercials for Subway Restaurants, Nickelodeon, the New York City Convention and Visitors Bureau, Campus Crusade and Walt Disney World.

He is the son of missionaries in Australia. He graduated from Taylor University in 1979 with a degree in biblical studies.
