= War Room (film) =

- Theatrical release poster
- Directed by: Alex Kendrick
- Written by: Alex Kendrick; Stephen Kendrick
- Produced by: Stephen Kendrick; Gary Wheeler
- Starring: Priscilla Shirer; T.C. Stallings; Karen Abercrombie; Alex Kendrick; Michael Jr.
- Cinematography: Bob M. Scott
- Edited by: Alex Kendrick; Steve Hullfish
- Music by: Paul Mills
- Production companies: TriStar Pictures; Provident Films; Affirm Films; Kendrick Brothers
- Distributed by: Sony Pictures Releasing
- Release date: August 28, 2015 (United States)
- Running time: 120 minutes
- Country: United States
- Language: English
- Budget: $3 million
- Box office: $74 million

War Room is a 2015 American Christian drama film directed by Alex Kendrick and written by him and Stephen Kendrick. It is the Kendrick brothers' fifth film and their first through their subsidiary, Kendrick Brothers Productions. The film was produced by Provident Films, Affirm Films and TriStar Pictures in partnership with the Kendrick brothers. The film stars Priscilla Shirer, T.C. Stallings, Karen Abercrombie, Alex Kendrick, and Michael Jr. It was the last film to use the 1993–2015 TriStar Pictures logo.

The film was released by Sony Pictures Releasing in North American theaters on August 28, 2015, and received generally negative reviews from film critics, while Christian media critics gave mostly positive reviews, and became a box office success and a sleeper hit, grossing $74 million worldwide including $67.8 million domestically to become the 7th highest-grossing Christian film in the United States. A spin-off titled The Forge (also made by the Kendrick Brothers), was released on August 23, 2024.

== Plot ==
Pharmaceutical salesman Tony Jordan and his wife, realtor Elizabeth Jordan, appear outwardly successful; they have a large house, plenty of money, and a beautiful daughter named Danielle. Behind the façade, however, Tony and Elizabeth's relationship is strained. Tony is callous, verbally abusive and thinking about cheating on Elizabeth. In addition, because his job requires frequent travel, he is almost never there for his daughter.

Elizabeth goes to work with an elderly woman, Miss Clara, to sell her house. Miss Clara senses the stress Elizabeth is under, and suggests that Elizabeth fight for their marriage by praying for Tony. Miss Clara shows Elizabeth a special closet she has dedicated to praying, which she calls her "War Room"; as she puts it, "in order to stand up and fight the enemy, you need to get on your knees and pray." As Elizabeth starts to seriously pray for her husband, Tony leaves for a business trip, having dinner with a beautiful woman who invites him back to her apartment. Meanwhile in his home, his wife Elizabeth is praying that if Tony is about to make a wrong decision, God to intervene and stop him. Just as he is about to leave the table with her, he becomes nauseous. Shortly afterward, Tony is fired for fabricating his sales figures; unbeknownst to Elizabeth and Danielle, he has been stealing drug samples and selling them to make even more money. Realizing he has hit rock bottom, Tony rededicates his life to God after finding his wife's prayer closet and reading the prayers about him she has been pinning on the wall. He now realizes that he has to return both the stolen samples and his ill-gotten money, even though revealing what he's done could potentially send him to prison. Tony meets with his former boss and confesses; his former boss is moved by his willingness to admit his wrongdoing and make amends, and decides not to press charges. Tony begins to show an interest in his daughter's jump-roping skills, and offers to participate with her and her friends in the upcoming double Dutch competition at the local community center. Tony and his daughter's team takes second place in the competition, creating a new bond between him and his daughter.

Elizabeth successfully sells Miss Clara's house to a retired pastor who realizes someone has been praying in the closet. Shortly afterwards, Tony is offered a job as the director of the community center. Although the pay is only half of what he used to make, he realizes that with the income from this new job combined with Elizabeth picking up some extra work, the family can live less frugal and be happy. Finally, Elizabeth realizes that all her prayers had been answered and she had fought her enemy with prayer. She says that "there's got to be a God in heaven."

== Cast ==
- Priscilla Shirer as Elizabeth Jordan
- T.C. Stallings as Tony Jordan, Elizabeth's husband
- Karen Abercrombie as Miss Clara Williams
- Alex Kendrick as Coleman Young
- Michael Jr. as Michael Alexander
- Alena Pitts as Danielle Jordan, Elizabeth & Tony's daughter
- Beth Moore as Mandy
- Tenae Downing as Veronica Drake
- Dave Blamy as Tom Stafford
- Thomas Ford as Leo Williams, Clara's son
- Ben Davies as Policeman

== Production ==
For this film, Alex and Stephen Kendrick decided to move away from Sherwood Pictures, the church-based film production company which had previously produced their films. In part the brothers left because they felt that the movie-making was distracting from other parts of the church's ministry, with Alex telling The Hollywood Reporter that they felt "We were the elephant in the room." Instead, the brothers produced the film through FaithStep Films and released it through Sony Pictures. Regarding the title of the film, director Kendrick says "We called it 'War Room' because, like the military, we should seek God for the right strategy before going into combat. By combat, I mean daily issues we face in our culture." The brothers got their inspiration from prayer, with Alex stating that he believes even the idea of a war room was given to them by God.

=== Filming ===
Principal photography took place over a three-month period during the summer of 2014 in several North Carolina locations, including Charlotte, Kannapolis, Concord, Hickory and Birkdale Village in Huntersville. At Oakwood Cemetery in Concord, two different scenes set 40 years apart were filmed. Through special effects, the Charlotte skyline, larger trees and some additional headstones were added.

=== African-American portrayals ===
Initial plans had the main characters being white; however, Alex began having dreams about a predominantly African-American cast and, believing that God was trying to tell him something, the brothers switched the characters to make it more in line with Alex's dream. Early on, Sony expressed some concerns over a film with a mostly African-American cast produced by a white-led production company, but the brothers stuck to the premise.

Several characters in the film are African-American and being released only months after the Charleston church shooting, those involved with the film say they don't believe that the timing of the film's release is a coincidence. According to director Kendrick, when Affirm Films first saw the film, they said, "If this had been told with a different race, it would be a different movie."

Stallings, who plays a major role in the film, says, "There are many people out there—white and black—who stay with their families and work through their problems. They aren’t thugs or gang leaders. War Room tells the truth about society by showing the reverse of that stereotype. Racial tension is dangerous and people are dying and a lot of us want to see that stopped. We protest and speak out and tweet out, but this problem is much bigger than human beings. This movie will give people a way to take these problems to the Lord and show them that prayer is the best weapon to fight back."

== Music ==
Provident Label Group and Sony Music Entertainment released a soundtrack with music from and inspired by the film and the film's original motion picture score by Paul Mills. They were both released on August 7, 2015.

=== Soundtrack ===
War Room (Music From and Inspired by the Motion Picture)

Soundtrack album by Various Artist
- Released: August 7, 2015
- Genre: Soundtrack
- Length: 43:13
- Label: Provident Label Group / Sony Music Entertainment

No.	Title	Music	Length
1.	"Warrior"	Steven Curtis Chapman	4:31
2.	"Impossible"	Building 429	4:49
3.	"Press On"	Mandisa	3:21
4.	"Me Without You (Remix)"	TobyMac	3:40
5.	"Crazy Faith"	John Waller	4:25
6.	"Shake Yourself Loose"	Vickie Winans	3:59
7.	"Amen"	I Am They	3:56
8.	"To Know You"	Casting Crowns	4:47
9.	"Healing Begins"	Tenth Avenue North	3:53
10.	"Movie Score – (Raise ‘Em Up, Lord / Rekindle The Fire)"	Paul Mills	5:52
Total length:			43:13

=== Score ===
War Room (Original Motion Picture Score)

Soundtrack album by Paul Mills
- Released: August 7, 2015
- Genre: Score
- Length: 57:05
- Label: Provident Label Group / Sony Music Entertainment

All music is composed by Paul Mills.

No.	Title	Music	Length
1.	"Opening"	Paul Mills	2:33
2.	"Mad Ball"	Paul Mills	0:45
3.	"Wall of Remembrance"	Paul Mills	0:36
4.	"Slick Salesman"	Paul Mills	1:17
5.	"Temptation"	Paul Mills	0:49
6.	"I Call It My War Room"	Paul Mills	2:26
7.	"Contemplation"	Paul Mills	0:35
8.	"Love Me a Little"	Paul Mills	1:38
9.	"My Favorite Rep"	Paul Mills	1:07
10.	"Do It for Me"	Paul Mills	0:46
11.	"Knife Point"	Paul Mills	0:28
12.	"Truth and Grace"	Paul Mills	1:37
13.	"Learning to Fight"	Paul Mills	7:25
14.	"Kicking Out the Devil"	Paul Mills	2:28
15.	"Tired Sense"	Paul Mills	2:07
16.	"Nightmare"	Paul Mills	0:32
17.	"Discovering the War Room"	Paul Mills	1:23
18.	"Forgive Me"	Paul Mills	3:13
19.	"I Was Impressed"	Paul Mills	0:58
20.	"I Am Not Done with Us"	Paul Mills	2:58
21.	"I Can Do Better"	Paul Mills	1:56
22.	"Jump with Us"	Paul Mills	1:00
23.	"My Bonus Plan"	Paul Mills	1:15
24.	"Whatever the Consequences"	Paul Mills	2:31
25.	"That Was Grace"	Paul Mills	2:16
26.	"Baked In"	Paul Mills	1:09
27.	"Answer to My Prayers"	Paul Mills	3:29
28.	"Good Samaritan"	Paul Mills	1:22
29.	"That’s My Dad"	Paul Mills	0:34
30.	"Raise ‘Em Up, Lord"	Paul Mills	3:24
31.	"Rekindle the Fire"	Paul Mills	2:32
Total length:			57:05

== Reception ==
=== Box office ===
War Room grossed $67.8 million in the United States and Canada and $6.2 million in other territories, for a worldwide total of $74 million, against a production budget of $3 million.

War Room made an estimated $600,000 from Thursday night shows, which began at 7 p.m. in 1,017 theaters. On its opening day, the film grossed $4 million. In its opening weekend, the film grossed $11.4 million, more than double initial projections, finishing second at the box office behind third-week number one holder Straight Outta Compton ($13.1 million) with only 1/3 the number of theaters and twice the gross revenue per theater.

In its second weekend, the film finished first at the box office with $9.5 million, and became the first film to reach the number 1 spot at the North American box office with a gross of less than $10 million since The Possession reached number 1 in its second weekend with $9.31 million during the same weekend in 2012. Over its four-day Labor Day weekend, the film posted an 18% increase with a weekend total of $13.4 million from 1,526 screens. Regarding War Room's box office performance, CNN said "some might call it a faith-based David versus the secular Goliaths in the entertainment industry". It still ranked number 3 in its third week, increasing its screen count to 1,647 with revenue of $7.8 million (18% drop). It increased its screen count by 295, but dropped to sixth place to $6.2 million.

=== Critical response ===
On Rotten Tomatoes, the film holds an approval rating of 34% based on 32 reviews, with an average rating of 4.70/10. Metacritic gives the film a weighted average score of 26 out of 100, based on 11 critics, indicating "generally unfavorable reviews". On CinemaScore, audiences gave the film a rare average grade of "A+" on an A+ to F scale, while PostTrak-surveyed filmgoers gave the film a 73% "definite recommend".

The Los Angeles Times called the film "more of a Bible study than anything else" and "so heavy on broad pulpit pounding that it’s challenging to get swept away by the story’s message." The A.V. Club called it "structurally listless and unimaginative", and said that it was "creepy to encourage women to believe the true source of their husbandly woes is Satan rather than an issue that probably needs to be discussed."

Christian-focused publications gave it positive reviews, however. The Christian Post praised the film, calling it better than Courageous and Fireproof. According to Crosswalk.com, "it comes as good news that War Room is a step up for the Kendricks, who continue to develop as filmmakers."

=== Home media ===
War Room was released on Blu-ray, DVD, and Digital HD by Sony Pictures Home Entertainment on December 22, 2015. The film debuted in second place on the home video chart behind Minions. The following week, War Room reached the top spot of the home video sales chart. As of June 2019, the film has made $48 million from home media sales.

== Awards and nominations ==
Award	Date of ceremony	Category	Result
MovieGuide Epiphany Prize	2016	Most Inspiring Movie	Won
MovieGuide Grace Award	2016	Actress - Karen Abercrombie	Won
Dove Award	2016	Inspirational Film of the Year	Won

== See also ==
- The Bible in film
- Christian cinema
- List of black films of the 2010s
- List of Christian films
