= Ken Bevel =

American pastor and actor

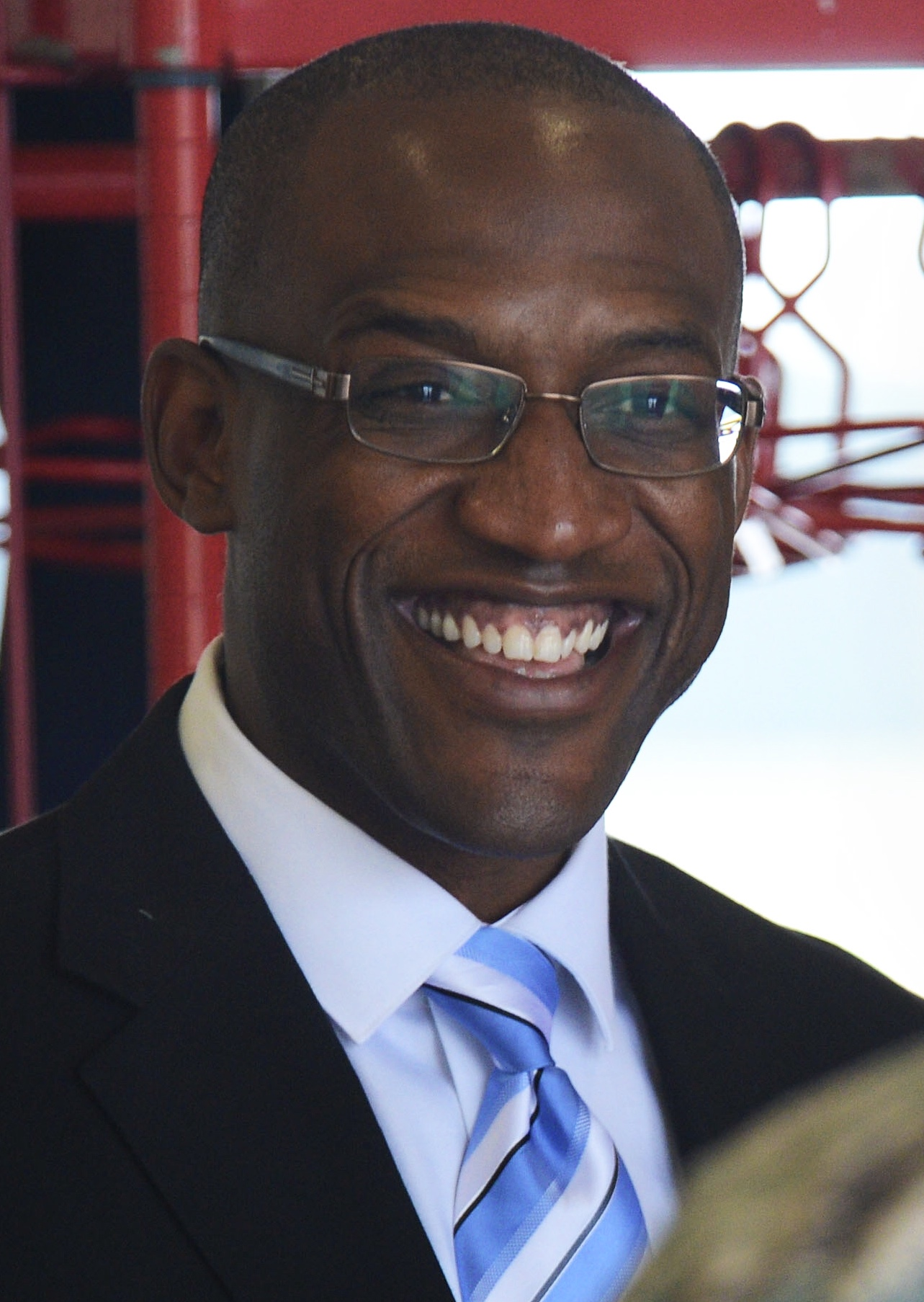
- Bevel in 2014
- Born: Kenneth Bevel; November 24, 1968 (age 57); Jacksonville, Florida, United States
- Occupations: Connections & Local Missions Pastor
- Spouse: Lauana Bevel
- Children: 2

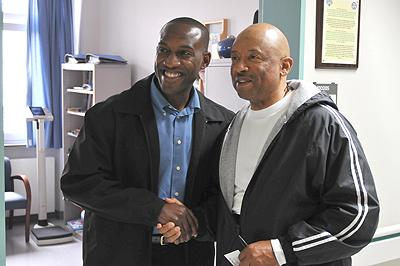
Ken Bevel (left) at Landstuhl Regional Medical Center 2009

Kenneth Bevel (born November 24, 1968) is an American former Marine Corps officer, pastor, and actor who co-starred in the 2008 film Fireproof and the 2011 film Courageous. He serves as the Connections & Local Missions Pastor at Sherwood Baptist Church, based in Albany, Georgia. In Fireproof, Bevel portrays firefighter Michael Simmons, and portrays police officer Nathan Hayes in Courageous.

== Filmography ==
- Fireproof (2008) - Michael Simmons
- Courageous (2011) - Nathan Hayes
- The Forge (2024) - James
