= Courageous (film) =

2011 film by Alex and Stephen Kendrick

- Theatrical release poster
- Directed by: Alex Kendrick
- Written by: Alex Kendrick; Stephen Kendrick
- Produced by: Stephen Kendrick
- Starring: Alex Kendrick; Ken Bevel; Kevin Downes; Ben Davies
- Cinematography: Bob Scott
- Edited by: Alex Kendrick; Bill Ebel; Steve Hullfish
- Music by: Mark Willard
- Production companies: TriStar Pictures (Original); Affirm Films; Provident Films; Sherwood Pictures; Kendrick Brothers Productions (Legacy)
- Distributed by: Sony Pictures Releasing
- Release dates: September 30, 2011 (Original); September 24, 2021 (Legacy)
- Running time: 130 minutes
- Country: United States
- Language: English
- Budget: $2 million
- Box office: $35.7 million

Courageous is a 2011 American independent Christian drama film directed and written by Alex Kendrick with his brother Stephen Kendrick. It is the fourth film by Sherwood Pictures, the creators of Flywheel (2003), Facing the Giants (2006), and Fireproof (2008).

Alex Kendrick stars in the film, along with Ken Bevel and Kevin Downes. About half of the cast and crew were volunteers from Sherwood Baptist Church, while the remainder were brought on through invitation-only auditions. Filming in Albany, Georgia concluded in June 2010. The film was marketed by Sony's Provident Films, which also marketed their previous films.

Courageous was released in the United States by Sony Pictures Releasing on September 30, 2011. The film was produced with a budget of $2 million, but on its opening weekend, it grossed $2 million in pre-sales alone and grossed $9.1 million total for the weekend. It grossed a total of $35.7 million, over 17 times its budget. The film opened to generally negative reviews from film critics but generally positive reviews from Christian critics. An extended, remastered cut of the film titled Courageous Legacy was released on September 24, 2021 with TriStar not being involved and Kendrick Brothers Productions co-producing, marking this the fourth film produced by their company, and the fifth and final film produced by Sherwood Pictures. It features a new ending set ten years after the original movie, 15 minutes of new scenes, new special effects, and is upscaled to 4K resolution.

== Plot ==
When his truck is stolen at a gas station, Nathan Hayes chases it and manages to reclaim the truck, but the criminal gets away. Though he is injured, he crawls back to his truck, and sees that his little baby boy in the back is unhurt. When the police arrive, sheriff's deputies Adam Mitchell and Shane Fuller meet Hayes, discovering he is a new deputy at their station, having recently moved to Albany, Georgia.

The personal lives of these officers are observed: Mitchell adores his nine-year-old daughter Emily, but is distant from his fifteen-year-old son, Dylan, because he doesn't share his son's interest in 5k runs. Hayes never knew his biological father, instead treating a neighbor as his father (even giving him Father's Day cards annually), but would risk his life to save his three children. However, his teenage daughter Jade, resents him because he has a strict policy about dating, and won't let her go out with her love interest Derrick, as she's only 15 years old and Derrick is 17. Fuller is divorced, as were his parents, and has joint custody of his son. David Thomson is young and single, although it is later revealed he has a daughter.

Javier Martinez is a Latin American immigrant struggling to provide for his family after being laid off when a construction company went over budget. While job-hunting, he walks down an alley asking God what He wants him to do when Mitchell, thinking he is a different Javier recommended to him by Fuller, calls him over to help with backyard projects and construction. After paying him for the job, Mitchell recommends him to a new full-time job, where he is hired.

One day, Emily is killed by a drunk driver, devastating Mitchell and his family. Following his daughter's closed-casket funeral service, Mitchell reads about fatherhood in the Bible. He decides he must be a better father and crafts a detailed "Resolution" to honor God in every aspect of his family. Hayes, Fuller, Thomson, and Martinez join him in his resolution at a formal ceremony conducted by Hayes's neighborhood mentor, the man he treats as a father. As a result of the resolution, Mitchell and Fuller mend their relationships with their sons, Hayes with his daughter, and he also visits the grave of his biological father whom he had never met and forgives him. Thomson reveals that he fathered a child in college and deserted the mother after she refused to have an abortion. He writes the mother and seeks to mend their relationship and to see his child, after seeing that abandoning kids contributes to crime on the streets, and does not want that burden on her.

Martinez's manager offers him a promotion on the condition that he falsify inventory documents. After being given a day to think about it, Martinez refuses, maintaining that it would be dishonoring to God and to his family. Impressed, his boss promotes him and raises his pay, revealing that the condition had been a test of Javier's integrity, with Javier being the only individual to pass after many others had been tested.

Later, Mitchell discovers that Fuller has been stealing drugs from police evidence to resell on the streets for money. Mitchell decides he must honor his Resolution and report the corruption. He sets up a sting, leading to Fuller's arrest and imprisonment. Fuller explains his motives that he was doing it for his son, feeling that his yearly pay wasn't enough to provide for him. Mitchell visits Fuller in jail where Fuller admits to his mistakes and asks Mitchell to look after his son. During a minor traffic stop, Hayes and Thomson unknowingly confront the armed leader of a gang they have been repeatedly encountering. One of the gang members is Derrick, who stops the gang leader from shooting Hayes with a shotgun. After an intense firefight, Deputy Hayes asks Derrick what he's doing with the gang, and the latter responds that he had no one else that cared about him.

At a Father's Day church service, the men present the Resolution and Mitchell urges the fathers in the congregation to be a godly influence on their families. Mitchell runs in a 5K race with both his and Fuller's sons, Hayes begins to teach and mentor Derrick in prison, and Thomson meets his daughter for the first time.

In the Legacy edition, ten years have passed. Nathan, now the Sheriff, David, now a Lieutenant, Javier, now an officer, Adam, and Shane's son Tyler, reunite at the jail where Shane is released after serving his sentence.

== Cast ==
- Alex Kendrick as Adam Mitchell
- Ken Bevel as Nathan Hayes
- Kevin Downes as Shane Fuller
- Ben Davies as David Thomson, a rookie deputy and Nathan's partner, who fathered a little girl in college.
- Renee Jewell as Victoria Mitchell, Adam's wife.
- Elanor Brown as Kayla Hayes, Nathan's wife.
- Taylor Hutcherson as Jade Hayes, Nathan and Kayla's oldest daughter.
- Robert Amaya as Javier Martinez
- Rusty Martin as Dylan Mitchell, Adam and Victoria's 15-year-old son.
- Angelita Nelson as Carmen Martinez, Javier's loving and supportive wife.
- Lauren Etchells as Emily Mitchell, Adam and Victoria's 9-year-old daughter.
- Donald Howze as Derrick Freeman, Jade's love interest and a gang member.
- Tony 'T.C.' Stallings as T.J., the leader of the gang Derrick is involved with and who tried to steal Nathan's truck at the beginning.
- Rusty Martin Sr. as Mr. Tyson, owner of the factory that Adam helps Javier get a job at.
- Ed Litton as Pastor Rogers (Litton, who in 2021 became President of the Southern Baptist Convention, plays a pastor helping Mitchell grieve Emily's death; Litton himself lost his first wife in an automobile accident and later married a widow whose first husband -- also a pastor -- had also died in that manner)
- Joshua Kendrick as Tyler Fuller, Shane's only son.

== Production ==
=== Announcement ===
The title and plot of Courageous were announced on November 15, 2009 by Alex Kendrick, Michael Catt, Jim McBride and Stephen Kendrick. Sherwood Pictures stated that "After much prayer, creative brainstorming, more prayer, wise counsel, and still more prayer, Sherwood Pictures is ready to move ahead with their fourth motion picture." Before the announcement, the filmmakers launched TheNextSherwoodMovie.com, which contained teasers for Courageous. At the time of the announcement, the Kendrick brothers stated that they had completed "about 80 percent of the plot", and they had planned to finish the script by the end of 2009.

=== Casting ===
In preceding Sherwood Pictures films, almost all of the cast and crew were composed of members of Sherwood Baptist Church, with Kirk Cameron being the notable exception with his lead role in Fireproof. For Courageous the producers expanded their search for acting talent. Roughly half of the cast are volunteers from the church, but the other half were through invitation-only audition sessions. The lead roles in the film are played by Alex Kendrick and Ken Bevel, both of whom have appeared in past Sherwood productions. Kevin Downes, who has appeared in various other films, played the role of Shane Fuller. Ben Davies, a student athlete at Samford University, played the role of David Thomson. Tony Stallings, former running back and winner of Animal Planet's King of the Jungle reality show, made his film debut.

The actors were still volunteers. The film would likely have cost several times more if they had used professional assistance. Director Kendrick said, "With volunteers no one is watching the clock and we're all in it together."

=== Filming ===
Principal photography of Courageous began on April 26, 2010 and concluded on June 25, 2010. The majority of the film was shot in Albany and the Dougherty County, Georgia area. Some scenes were shot in the Dougherty County Jail. Jon Erwin served as second unit director. More than 170 media outlets, such as Inside Edition, visited the set. The Duggar family from TLC's 19 Kids and Counting were extras during a father-son 5K race. Jim Bob Duggar and seven of his ten sons joined hundreds of other fathers and sons in filming the scene. Their involvement in the film was shown on 19 Kids and Counting in "Duggars go Hollywood". The Duggar daughters acted as extras in a funeral scene at Sherwood Baptist Church that involved several police officers in uniform.

In order to enhance the quality of the film, the production crew used a new camera technology, "Red One", by the Red Digital Cinema Camera Company. Kendrick estimated the production budget would exceed $1 million — double that of Fireproof. The final budget has been reported at $2 million.

== Release ==
=== Rating ===
In December 2010, the Motion Picture Association of America rated the film PG-13 for "some violence and drug content". That rating was surrendered a few days later, but was later reinstated. Courageous is the first film by Sherwood Pictures to receive a PG-13 rating.

=== Marketing ===
The contemporary Christian band Casting Crowns released a song titled "Courageous" to promote the film with a video featuring scenes from it.

Tony Dungy, a Super Bowl-winning football coach, mentioned the film in an article he wrote about fatherhood for USA Today. He said, "As men, we could all take a lesson from [the fathers in Courageous] and ask ourselves, 'What can I do today to be a more involved dad?'"

=== Box office ===
Courageous was released on September 30, 2011 to 1,161 theaters, grossing $3.1 million on its opening day and debuting in fourth place with an actual gross of $9,063,147 for the opening weekend, the best opening of all new films released that weekend. It sold over $2 million in pre-sale tickets, the most of the weekend on Fandango, beating out The Lion King 3D, Moneyball, Dolphin Tale, and Drive. A re-release was announced by Kendrick Brothers scheduled for 2021 with new scenes and a new ending.

After its opening weekend, Entertainment Weekly wrote, "...Courageous is the real success story of the weekend...Courageous earned a strong $8.8 million, outdoing the $6.8 million opening of Sherwood's 2008 picture Fireproof, which became the highest-grossing independent film that year with $33.5 million total. Shown in 1,161 theaters (yet, notably, just one theater in Manhattan), Courageous earned the best per theater average of any wide release with a robust $7,580." Courageous beat out all three Hollywood movies which opened on the same weekend: 50/50, What's Your Number?, and Dream House, which were produced with budgets of $8 million, $20 million, and $50 million, respectively. According to Box Office Mojo, its opening weekend ranks fifth all-time among Christian movies, behind The Passion of the Christ and the three Chronicles of Narnia films.

As of February 27, 2022, the film has grossed $35.7, over 17 times its budget.

After the Kendrick brothers' previous films were released to DVD following the theatrical run, the film started an international theatrical roll-out which began November 10 in Argentina, Australia, and New Zealand. The film debuted at #18 in Argentina, #16 in Australia and #21 in New Zealand, with weekend opening grosses of $19,536, $107,781, and $10,529 respectively. The film opened in Mexico on December 2, ranking 31st with a total of $6,911 from 15 screens. As of December 4, the international gross for the movie is $219,977. As of 2020 the film has grossed $34,522,221 domestically and $663,663 internationally with a worldwide total of $35,185,884. Becoming the Kendrick brother's highest grossing film until it got surpassed by War Room in 2015.

=== Critical reception ===
Review aggregation website Rotten Tomatoes gives the film an approval rating of 43% based on 21 reviews and an average rating of 4.8/10. The website's critical consensus reads, "While the filmmaking is fairly competent, Courageous is overall worthless to anybody who doesn't subscribe to its dogmatic agenda." On Metacritic, the film has a score of 42 out of 100 based on 10 reviews, indicating "mixed or average" reviews. Audiences polled by CinemaScore gave the film a rare "A+" grade on an A+ to F scale.

Roger Moore of the Orlando Sentinel gave the film a mediocre review, saying "the film travels far beyond its dramatic climax, aiming for an altar call finale." Frank Scheck of The Hollywood Reporter said Courageous demonstrated the Kendrick brothers' "growing expertise as filmmakers with its skillful blending of moving drama, subtle comedy and several impressive action sequences, including a well-staged foot chase and a harrowing shootout between the cops and bad guys."

Hannah Goodwyn of the Christian Broadcasting Network rated Courageous 3 out of 5, saying "Courageous' biblical message is clear and good. Unfortunately, its delivery is weakened by some rookie acting and excessive dialogue." Adam R. Holz of Focus on the Family Plugged In Online said Courageous has "A compelling story line with plenty of action and just the right amount of humor. The Film underscores the importance of fatherhood...plus I like how it creatively weaves in the Gospel. I am happily giving Courageous 4.5 shiny badges out of 5 for family friendliness."

Alex Kendrick and Robert Amaya were nominated at the 20th Annual Movie Guide Awards under the category of Most Inspiring Performance in Movies in 2011, with Kendrick winning and the film was named the Most Inspiring Movie of 2011.

=== Home media ===
The film was released on DVD and Blu-ray on January 17, 2012 as an "Exclusive Collector's Edition", and was #1 in disc sales in the US the week ending January 22, 2012 according to The Hollywood Reporter. According to The Numbers, DVD and Blu-ray sales as of May 2015 totaled over $23,000,000.

=== Re-release ===
In October 2020 the Kendrick Brothers announced a re-release of the film, maintaining the original storyline with some scene changes, but adding a "10 Years Later" sequence after the original film's ending, with Alex Kendrick, Ken Bevel, Kevin Downes, Ben Davies, Robert Amaya, and Joshua Kendrick reprising their roles from the original film. This extended, remastered cut of the film titled Courageous Legacy was released on October 15, 2021, approximating the 10th anniversary of the film's release.

== Awards ==
- 2012 San Antonio Independent Christian Film Festival: "Best of Festival", and "Best Feature Film"
- 2012 Epiphany Prize: "Most Inspiring Movie"
- 2012 Grace Award: "Most Inspiring Performance in Movies", Alex Kendrick, and "Most Inspiring Performance in Movies", Robert Amaya
- 2013 Dove Award: "Inspirational Film Of The Year"

== Related media ==
Two film tie-in books were written for Courageous; "The Resolution for Men" by Stephen and Alex Kendrick, and "The Resolution for Women" by Priscilla Shirer. "Courageous Living" by Michael Catt, "Rite of Passage" by Jim McBride, and a film novelization by Randy Alcorn were also released.

== See also ==
- The Bible in film
- Christian cinema
- Law enforcement in the United States
- List of Christian films
