= Risen (2016 film) =

- Theatrical release poster
- Directed by: Kevin Reynolds
- Screenplay by: Kevin Reynolds; Paul Aiello
- Story by: Paul Aiello
- Produced by: Patrick Aiello; Mickey Liddell; Pete Shilaimon
- Starring: Joseph Fiennes; Tom Felton; Peter Firth; Cliff Curtis
- Cinematography: Lorenzo Senatore
- Edited by: Steve Mirkovich
- Music by: Roque Baños
- Production companies: Columbia Pictures; LD Entertainment; Affirm Films
- Distributed by: Sony Pictures Releasing
- Release dates: February 15, 2016 (Dallas); February 19, 2016 (United States)
- Running time: 107 minutes
- Countries: United States; Spain
- Language: English
- Budget: $20 million
- Box office: $46.8 million

Risen is a 2016 biblical drama film directed by Kevin Reynolds and written by Reynolds and Paul Aiello. An American-Spanish co-production, the film stars Joseph Fiennes, Tom Felton, Peter Firth, and Cliff Curtis, and details a Roman soldier's search for Jesus's body following his resurrection. Sony Pictures Releasing through its Columbia Pictures label released the film to theaters in the United States on February 19, 2016. It received mixed reviews and grossed $46 million worldwide.

== Plot ==
Clavius, a Roman Tribune of Legio X Fretensis, suppresses an insurrection of zealots led by Barabbas, then supervises the crucifixion of Yeshua and orders his men to guard the dead body. The body disappears, and the soldiers claim Yeshua's followers stole it to make it appear that he rose from the dead. Pontius Pilate orders Clavius to find the body, to quell an imminent uprising in Jerusalem before the Emperor arrives. Clavius and his aide Lucius question people who claim to have seen Yeshua after the resurrection.

Numerous leads are dug up, and their accounts soon become increasingly miraculous and difficult to believe. Some of the followers, such as Mary Magdalene and Bartholomew, seemingly speak only in riddles and refuse to betray any others. Clavius's intense investigation begins to disturb Romans and Hebrews alike, and Pilate, under pressure from many sides and fearful of Caesar's wrath, grows increasingly distant and unsupportive. Running out of new leads, Clavius revisits a disgraced Roman soldier, assigned to guard Yeshua's cave tomb, now a drunkard, and vehemently shakes the drunken man out of a lie that he had previously stuck to. The soldier recounts a fantastic story that, on the morning Yeshua disappeared, a blinding flash appeared, during which the stone and ropes sealing the tomb disintegrated, and a figure emerged, accompanied by a booming voice that sent him and a fellow soldier fleeing in fear. Clavius does not believe him.

During a raid through a Jewish enclave, Clavius unexpectedly discovers a seemingly resurrected Yeshua with his apostles in a solitary abode. Stunned, he calls off the search, barring Lucius and his men from finding Yeshua and the apostles. Clavius goes inside the house and makes eye contact with Yeshua. Clavius is in disbelief as he saw Yeshua crucified. That night, another Roman raid, led by Lucius and Pilate, attacks the building that Clavius had forbidden them to enter and finds it empty, save for a note from Clavius, who has decided to follow Yeshua and the disciples. Having abandoned Roman polytheism and the god Mars, Clavius, at first distrustful of the group, soon joins Yeshua and his followers on a journey to determine the validity of his mortal rejuvenation, during which he talks to and befriends both Yeshua and the apostle Peter.

Pilate deduces that Clavius has apparently betrayed him, and dispatches a contingent of Roman troops, led by a promoted Lucius, to pursue him and Yeshua. Clavius assists the disciples in evading the Roman search party, and, when caught by Lucius, Clavius disarms him, then convinces him to let them pass quietly. Consequently, Clavius witnesses Yeshua's miraculous healing of a leper, and then the ascension of Yeshua into Heaven; After which the Apostles split up to resume their journeys, and Clavius bids farewell to Peter. Later, after communicating his travels to a stranger in a remote dwelling, Clavius acknowledges the tale's strangeness and its veracity, feeling he will never be the same.

== Cast ==
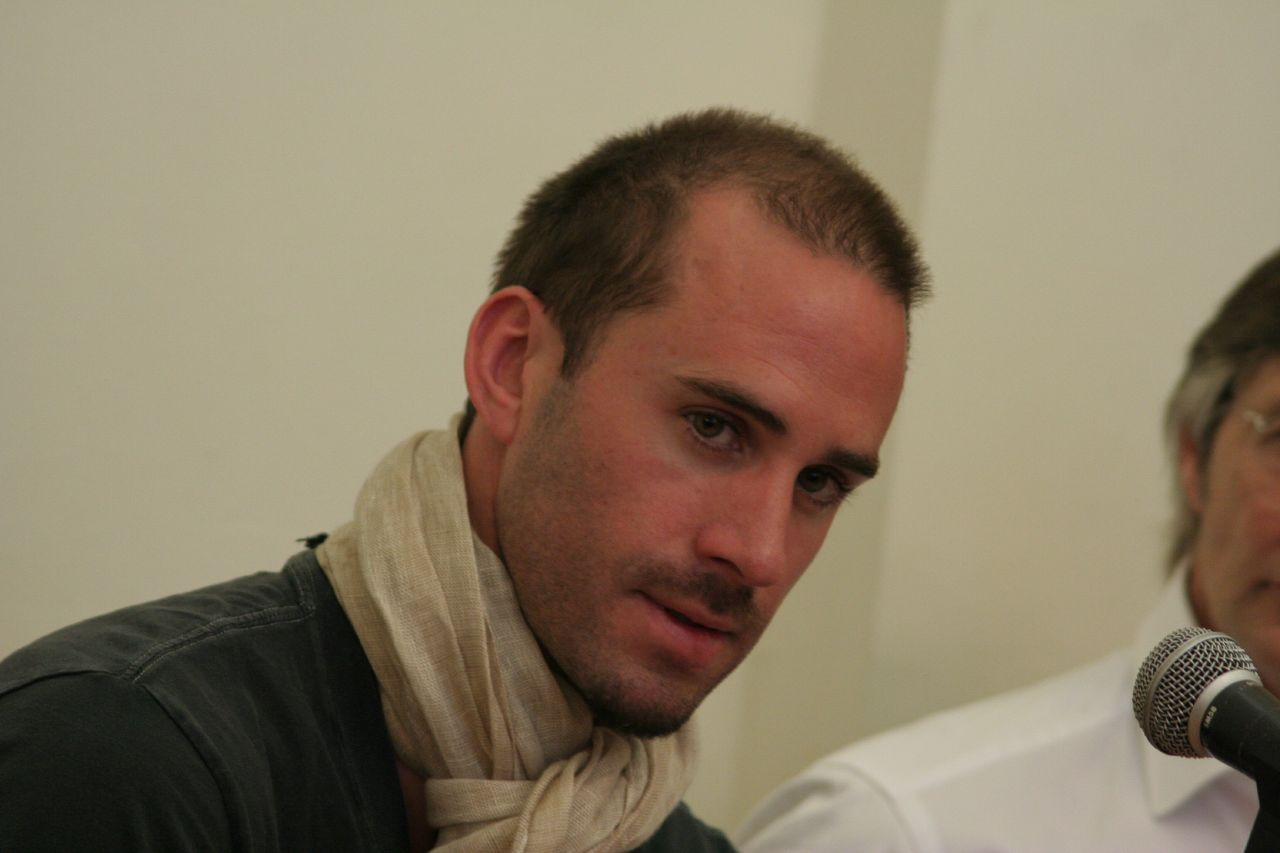
Actor Joseph Fiennes, who portrayed Roman Tribune Clavius.

- Joseph Fiennes as Clavius Aquila Valerius Niger
- Tom Felton as Lucius Tyco Ennius
- Peter Firth as Pontius Pilate
- Cliff Curtis as Yeshua the Messiah
- María Botto as Mary Magdalene
- Luis Callejo as Joses
- Antonio Gil as Joseph of Arimathea
- Stephen Greif as Caiaphas
- Richard Atwill as Polybius
- Stewart Scudamore as Peter
- Andy Gathergood as Quintus
- Stephen Hagan as Bartholomew
- Mish Boyko as John
- Jan Cornet as Thomas
- Joe Manjón as Simon the Canaanite
- Pepe Lorente as Thaddeus
- Stavros Demetraki as Philip
- Selva Rasalingam as James
- Manu Fullola as Matthew
- Mario Tardon as Andrew
- Paco Manzanedo as Centurion
- Karim Saleh as Zealot Leader
- Victor Trapani as Nicodemus
- Frida Cauchi as Mother Mary
- Alberto Ayala as James the Just

== Production ==
In 2013, Kevin Reynolds was brought aboard as director for the planned project The Resurrection of Jesus Christ, a film intended as a mystery/thriller and "unofficial sequel" to The Passion of the Christ, with a script written by Paul Aiello, Karen Janszen and Reynolds.

The film was shot in Malta and Spain between August and November 2015.

== Release ==
The film held its world premiere on February 15, 2016, at the Highland Park Village Theatre in Dallas, Texas. Columbia Pictures then released it in the United States on February 19, 2016.

=== Home media ===
Risen was released on digital media on May 10, 2016, and was followed by a DVD, Blu-ray and 4K Ultra HD release on May 24, 2016, from AFFIRM Films and Sony Pictures Home Entertainment. The film debuted in second place on home video sales charts behind Deadpool for the week ending May 29, 2016.

== Reception ==
=== Box office ===
Risen grossed $36.9 million in the United States and Canada, and $9.9 million in other countries, for a worldwide total of $46.8 million, against a production budget of $20 million.

In the United States and Canada, pre-release tracking suggested the film would gross $7–12 million from 2,915 theaters in its opening weekend, alongside Race and The Witch. The film grossed $4 million on its first day and $11.8 million in its opening weekend, finishing third at the box office behind Deadpool ($56.5 million) and Kung Fu Panda 3 ($12.5 million).

=== Critical response ===
On Rotten Tomatoes, the film has an approval rating of 53% based on 132 reviews, with an average rating of 5.60/10. The site's critical consensus reads: "Risen benefits from a lighter tone than many faith-based productions, as well as a unique take on the Greatest Story Ever Told and a terrific turn from star Joseph Fiennes." On Metacritic, it has a weighted average score of 51 out of 100, based on 28 critics, indicating "mixed or average reviews". Audiences polled by CinemaScore gave the film an average grade of "A−" on an A+ to F scale.

Richard Roeper of the Chicago Sun-Times gave the film two out of four stars, praising the different take on the story as well as the supporting actors, but criticizing Fiennes' stoic performance. Megan Basham of World applauded the film, writing: "It's undeniably one of the higher-quality faith-based films to hit theaters in recent years, with acting, writing, and production values to rival other mainstream releases". Michael Foust of The Christian Examiner gave it 4.5 out of 5 stars and called it "a detective-type story that is inspiring and moving". "Yes, Risen is historical fiction, but it's largely harmonious with the Gospel story, incredibly well done, and not much different from those Sunday School discussions many of us take part in week to week", Foust wrote.

The film featured Roman and Judean characters speaking with British accents despite its first-century setting. Reviewers noted the use of "the King's English" and Oxford-style accents among both Roman and Jewish characters, while others regarded it as an example of the convention of using British accents to portray Roman authority figures.

== See also ==
- List of Easter films
