= The Forge (2024 film) =

Film by Alex and Stephen Kendrick

- Theatrical release poster
- Directed by: Alex Kendrick
- Written by: Alex Kendrick; Stephen Kendrick
- Produced by: Stephen Kendrick
- Starring: Cameron Arnett; Priscilla Shirer; Aspen Kennedy; Karen Abercrombie; T. C. Stallings; B. J. Arnett; Ken Bevel; Benjamin Watson; Jonathan Evans; Jerry Shirer; Tommy Woodard
- Cinematography: Bob Scott
- Edited by: Bill Ebel; Alex Kendrick
- Music by: Zachary Leffew
- Production companies: Affirm Films; Provident Films; Kendrick Brothers
- Distributed by: Sony Pictures Releasing
- Release date: August 23, 2024
- Running time: 125 minutes
- Country: United States
- Language: English
- Budget: $5 million
- Box office: $40.4 million

The Forge is a 2024 American independent Christian drama film directed by Alex Kendrick, who co-wrote and co-produced it with Stephen Kendrick. A spin-off to War Room (2015), it is the Kendrick brothers' ninth film and the sixth through their subsidiary, Kendrick Brothers Productions. It stars Cameron Arnett, Priscilla Shirer, Aspen Kennedy, Karen Abercrombie, T. C. Stallings, B. J. Arnett, Ken Bevel, Benjamin Watson, Jonathan Evans, Jerry Shirer, and Tommy Woodard.

The Forge was released in the United States by Sony Pictures Releasing on August 23, 2024. It received mixed reviews from critics but positive reviews from its audience, and grossed $40.4 million worldwide against a $5 million budget.

== Plot ==
In Charlotte, North Carolina, 19-year old Isaiah Wright plays basketball and video games with his friends, but is negligent in his home life with chores. His mother Cynthia insists he get a job or move out, as he's passed on attending college. Isaiah has a decrepit Ford Mustang in their garage that his father failed to restore with him as promised, so he commutes by bike. At a coffee shop, Isaiah flirts with the cashier Abigail, until her father kicks Isaiah out. Isaiah fills out an application for Moore Fitness when a man walks in and asks Isaiah why he's there. A dismissive Isaiah finds out the man is the president of the company, Joshua Moore. Leaving, Isaiah is stopped by Joshua, who invites Isaiah to lunch.

During lunch, Joshua gives him his business card and asks him three questions, telling him to call when he's ready to answer them. Cynthia discusses Isaiah's life prospects with her friends when Isaiah asks to borrow her car. After facing one dead end for applying, Isaiah gives up his daily search to play basketball, losing track of time. When he returns late, Cynthia lambasts him, comparing him to his father, leading Isaiah to storm off. Cynthia laments to her friends while Isaiah decides to take up Joshua's invitation. Isaiah returns, answering Joshua's questions vaguely. Joshua tells Isaiah that he wishes to mentor him and promote life principles, and shows him the factory floor. Joshua introduces Isaiah to his wife Janelle.

When Isaiah shows up late and unprepared for work on his third day, Joshua firmly tells him the importance of being on time. Cynthia invites Miss Clara, a devout Christian, for prayer support. Joshua tells Isaiah biblical verses and invites him for a food distribution event. Isaiah volunteers and begins to feel better. Isaiah learns from Janelle that her son Jalen was killed at the age of 17 by a drunk driver. Joshua had blamed Janelle, and a mechanic introduced Joshua to the Christian faith. Isaiah contemplates over a paper at the charity event and expresses desire for Jesus.

Joshua takes Isaiah as his brother in Christ and suggests baptism. Isaiah is given more work experience and is introduced to the Forge, a meetup of Christian men who were inspired by Joshua. Isaiah begins reading the Bible and organizes his room, reluctantly surrendering video games. Isaiah learns of the international missionaries done by Moore Fitness (mission accounts) and the importance of "top accounts" needed to sustain them. While meeting with a truck driver, Isaiah finds out the driver is his father, who abandoned his family after cheating on Cynthia and taking most of their savings. He opens up to Joshua about his desire for revenge, and Joshua relates once wanting the drunk driver who killed his son to "rot in his cell." Joshua emphasizes the need for forgiveness and gives him his journal.

Overheard by Cynthia, Isaiah forgives his dad and praises the Lord. At the Forge, Joshua gives him a sword, telling him the importance of support. Forge member Bobby tells Isaiah he was the drunk driver responsible for Jalen's death; Joshua led Bobby to Jesus and was the first person Joshua helped. Isaiah begins paying rent, exercising, is baptized, and continues to follow the Lord. Now 20 years old, Isaiah tells Joshua he sent a letter to his dad. Joshua blesses Isaiah before the Forge, and Cynthia shows Isaiah the newly constructed Mustang fixed with Joshua's help and gives him the car. Isaiah returns to the coffee shop and apologizes to Abigail and her dad, who accepts the apology.

The Moores are at a business meeting in Dallas when accountant Emmet tells Joshua of competing gym company Slayer Sports; Moore Fitness' top account Gym Fit recently elected a president, Greyson Lance, who requested 3,000 units from both companies as a competition over who could supply them faster. Failure to deliver the units and secure the top partnership with Gym Fit would mean Moore Fitness loses the mission account or dismisses a third of their employees. Meanwhile, Joshua convinces the remaining employees, who have just done an 8-hour shift, to take on the extensive order into a further 16 hours. The engineer Cody uses his robots to assist. Joshua tells Emmet to let Isaiah speak with Lance; Isaiah convinces him to agree to a 7-year partnership.

In a mid-credits scene, Isaiah receives a message from his dad in which he asks to talk. Abigail and Isaiah share a friendly encounter in college.

== Cast ==
- Cameron Arnett as Joshua Moore
- Priscilla Shirer as Cynthia Wright and Elizabeth Jordan, identical twin sisters (Shirer reprise her role as Elizabeth from War Room)
- Aspen Kennedy as Isaiah Wright, Cynthia's teen son
- Karen Abercrombie as Miss Clara Williams (reprising her role from War Room)
- T. C. Stallings as Tony Jordan, Elizabeth's husband (reprising his role from War Room)
- B. J. Arnett as Janelle Moore, Joshua's wife
- Alexandra Rose Frazier as Abigail Watson
- Joseph Curtis Callender as Tim Watson, Abigail's father
- Ken Bevel as James
- Benjamin Watson as himself
- Jonathan Evans as Jonathan
- Jerry Shirer as Vaughn
- Tommy Woodard as Bobby
- Marianne Haaland as Wanda
- Alena Pitts as Danielle Jordan, Elizabeth & Tony's daughter (reprising her role from War Room)
- Michael J. Patterson as Darren

== Production ==
In November 2023, it was revealed that a Christian drama film directed by Alex Kendrick titled The Forge had completed principal photography from June to July in Albany, Georgia. Cameron Arnett, Priscilla Shirer, Aspen Kennedy, Karen Abercrombie, T. C. Stallings, B. J. Arnett, Ken Bevel, Benjamin Watson, Jonathan Evans, Jerry Shirer, and Tommy Woodard round out the cast. Alex Kendrick, who typically acts in his films, solely directs The Forge. He explained that the title symbolizes the refining process of faith through hardship, much like metal shaped by fire.

Principal photography for The Forge took place in Albany, Georgia with cinematographer Bob Scott utilizing the Arri Alexa 35 camera and Cooke Anamorphic lenses to achieve a cinematic 2.40 aspect ratio. Some scenes were shot at various locations throughout Dougherty County, including Cornerstone Coffee + Co, Ray Charles Plaza, and Downtown Albany. The movie is set within the same cinematic universe as War Room.

The production emphasized natural lighting, with gaffer Jonathan Terpstra employing large, soft directional light sources for outdoor scenes, while key grip Spencer Weaver shaped the lighting to maintain contrast. For interior sequences, the team avoided excessive overhead lighting, instead pushing large light sources through windows to create a more organic feel. Post-production color grading was completed by Keith Roush at Roush Media in Atlanta, marking the fifth collaboration between Roush and the Kendrick brothers. Roush developed a specialized LUT for the film, ensuring consistency in visual tone throughout production and post-processing. The film's color grade emphasized warm skin tones, rich textures, and a filmic look achieved through Baselight 6.0's advanced grain structure and halation tools. The HDR grade was mastered at 2000-nits to optimize image quality for future viewing, with Dolby Vision used to adapt the final look for SDR and theatrical release. The production was described by the cast as a deeply spiritual experience. Aspen Kennedy, in his first major role, noted that it was the first time he had worked on a set where "the work comes second, and the Lord is first." Cameron Arnett called the atmosphere on set a “little slice of heaven,” while BJ Arnett, who is married to Cameron, expressed how deeply the screenplay resonated with them both.

== Release ==
The Forge was distributed by Sony Pictures Releasing on August 23, 2024. In December 21, the film was made available on Netflix, and quickly became a Top 5 movie in the U.S., surpassing larger-budget titles. The Kendrick brothers screened The Forge at the Southern Baptist Convention Annual Meeting in Indianapolis, sharing their vision for discipleship through filmmaking. Alex Kendrick removed himself from an acting role to emphasize self-denial, while Stephen Kendrick stressed the film’s focus on the Great Commission. Lifeway partnered with the filmmakers to develop books and Bible studies, including The Forge Bible Study and Fully Devoted, to support discipleship efforts.

== Reception ==
=== Box office ===
In the United States and Canada, The Forge was released alongside Blink Twice and The Crow, and played in 1,818 theaters in its opening weekend. The film made $2.4 million on its first day, including $600,000 from Thursday night previews. It went on to debut at $6.7 million, finishing fifth at the box office. The film made $4.6 million in its second weekend.

=== Reception ===
On the review aggregator website Rotten Tomatoes, 63% of 16 critics' reviews are positive, with an average rating of 6.0/10.

Audiences polled by CinemaScore gave The Forge a rare average grade of "A+" on an A+ to F scale, while those at PostTrak gave the film an average of five out of five stars, with 88% saying they would definitely recommend it. Charisma News named it the Top Christian Film of 2024.

== See also ==
- Basketball in the United States
- The Bible in film
- Christian cinema
- List of Christian films
