= Overcomer (film) =

- Theatrical release poster
- Directed by: Alex Kendrick
- Written by: Alex Kendrick; Stephen Kendrick
- Produced by: Aaron Burns; Justin Tolley; Stephen Kendrick
- Starring: Aryn Wright-Thompson; Alex Kendrick; Priscilla Shirer; Shari Rigby; Jack Sterner; Cameron Arnett
- Cinematography: Bob Scott
- Edited by: Alex Kendrick; Steve Hullfish; Bill Ebel
- Music by: Paul Mills
- Production companies: Affirm Films; Provident Films; Kendrick Brothers
- Distributed by: Sony Pictures Releasing
- Release date: August 23, 2019 (United States)
- Running time: 119 minutes
- Country: United States
- Budget: $5 million
- Box office: $38 million

Overcomer is a 2019 American Christian drama film directed by Alex Kendrick, who co-wrote the script with Stephen Kendrick. It is the Kendrick brothers' sixth film and their second through their subsidiary, Kendrick Brothers Productions. The film was released by Sony Pictures Releasing on August 23, 2019.

It grossed $38 million worldwide against a $5 million budget and garnered Alex Kendrick's third "A+" on CinemaScore. He is the second director to have three films receive the grade, along with Rob Reiner.

== Plot ==
John Harrison (Alex Kendrick) is a basketball coach at a high school and married to Amy (Shari Rigby). Due to the manufacturing plant being moved to another city, all of the good basketball players, along with their families, must move also. School Principal Olivia Brooks (Priscilla Shirer) tells John that the school is losing several teachers and coaches and that she needs him to coach cross country, as she doesn’t want the school to lose another program.

At the tryouts for cross country, only one student shows up. Nevertheless, John agrees to be the running coach for Hannah Scott (Aryn Wright-Thompson), who is asthmatic. Hannah lives with her grandmother, Barbara Scott (Denise Armstrong), who has been telling her all her life that both her parents are dead. Hannah also steals items from students at school and has a collection of them. One day, on his hospital visits to help the pastor, John accidentally enters the room of Thomas Hill (Cameron Arnett). Hill is blind and suffering from diabetic complications. Hill also had been a cross country runner. After a couple of visits to see Hill, John finds out that Hill is Hannah's father. Hill abandoned Hannah and her mother when Hannah was a baby and Barbara has been trying to protect her from being hurt by him again, albeit by lying to Hannah about him. John also later finds out that the principal was Hannah's mother's friend and has been paying her tuition fees.

John tells Hannah about her father and he and Amy take her to meet him. Though reluctant at first, she eventually accepts him and starts visiting him more. Through the process she discovers herself and also strengthens her Christian faith and her belief in Jesus Christ as her Heavenly father. Hannah returns all of the stolen items and practices rigorously.

Barbara finds out about her visits to her father and angrily confronts John and Amy over letting Hannah meet her father without discussing it with her. She threatens legal action until she is chastised by Hannah for lying to her all this time. John, Amy, and Barbara then each go to God in prayer about the situation, each asking Him for forgiveness and guidance.

On the day of the State Championship race, John gives Hannah ear buds and a player. John tells her to play the player as the race begins. Through the race, Hannah hears her father's voice of coaching and encouragement, leading her to win the race and become the state champion.

Later, Hill passes away. A couple of years later, Hannah tells her story to her cross country friends. Then Hannah puts a flash drive in the player and runs through the city while listening to the recording from her father which begins with "It's your 21st birthday."

== Cast ==
- Alex Kendrick as John Harrison, former basketball coach who reluctantly begins coaching cross-country
- Shari Rigby as Amy Harrison, John's wife
- Priscilla Shirer as Olivia Brooks, the principal of Brookshire Christian School and mentor to Hannah Scott
- Cameron Arnett as Thomas Hill, a blind man and former runner harboring a secret past
- Aryn Wright-Thompson as Hannah Scott, an orphan and high-school cross-country runner being raised by her grandmother
- Denise Armstrong as Barbara Scott, Hannah's grandmother who raised her after her father abandoned her and her mother died.
- Jack Sterner as Ethan Harrison, John Harrison's son
- Ben Davies as Coach Myers

== Production ==
The idea that resulted in Overcomer came to Alex Kendrick in 2011 while he was visiting cross-country events for children:

I saw a lot of dads coaching their kids, speaking into them, affirming them . . . [a]nd I remember Paul in scripture talking about life is like a race. And you want to finish well. Then [the idea] went in the prayer incubator. Then as we were praying about, 'Lord, what do you want us to do?', that came back to mind. And the prompting to talk about identity.

Overcomer was filmed mainly in Columbus, Georgia, with a few scenes shot in Nashville, Tennessee and Albany, Georgia. In the summer of 2018, Affirm Films and Provident Films announced that they had wrapped up filming and were now in post-production.

Overcomer was made with a $5 million budget, which is $2 million more than their last film, War Room's budget. Because of the larger budget, the film was shot with the same camera equipment used to film The Avengers, with the indoor shots being filmed in sets built by the production crew, which was something the Kendricks had never done before in their previous films. The film's producer and co-writer Stephen Kendrick said of their work on the film: "[Overcomer is] the best shot . . . [t]he best lighting. I would say the best acting in so many ways. The storyline has some neat twists and turns in it."

Several actors appearing in earlier films by the Kendrick Brothers were cast for roles in Overcomer, including Priscilla Shirer and Ben Davies. Paul Mills, who wrote the score for War Room, also returned to compose for Overcomer. The soundtrack includes the record setting No. 1 Christian song "You Say" by Lauren Daigle that held the top spot for 62 weeks. It also crossed over and reached No. 1 on the Adult Contemporary charts.

== Theme ==
Overcomer's main theme is finding one's identity in Christ, and is based mainly on Ephesians 1 and 2. On the issue the film was intended to address, Alex Kendrick related the following:

Our culture wants to say identity is what you feel, or what culture says about you, or some status, job status, financial status . . . [a]nd all those things can change. So, who are you when what you are known for is stripped away?

Concerning the religious nature of the film and the Kendrick Brothers' previous productions, Kendrick said:

Our primary [purpose] is to help people who already know Christ, to continue growing and live out their faith.

But there is truth in our movies that will bleed over into secular audiences as well. Many people that watch our films are impacted by the messages, even if they don't share our faith.

We can make a movie but only God can change the heart.

The title of the film was inspired by 1 John 5:5.

== Release ==
Overcomer screened early in several cities, including Atlanta, Georgia. It also received a pre-screening on March 28, 2019 at the National Religious Broadcasters' Proclaim 19. The film was theatrically released in the United States on August 23, 2019.

=== Home media ===
It was released by Sony Pictures Home Entertainment on Digital HD on November 26, 2019, followed by a 4K Ultra HD, Blu-ray and DVD release on December 17, 2019.

== Reception ==
=== Box office ===
In the United States and Canada, Overcomer was released alongside Angel Has Fallen, Overcomer was projected to gross around $6 million from 1,723 theaters in its opening weekend. Prior to its release, Fandango reported that the film's advance ticket sales were surpassing those of Breakthrough, which debuted to $11.3 million in March 2019. Overcomer made $3 million on its first day, including $775,000 from Thursday night previews. It went on to slightly over-perform, debuting to $8.1 million over the weekend; as with many faith-based films, it played best in Mid-West and Southern states. The film has grossed $38 million worldwide as of January 2020.

According to the film's director, Alex Kendrick, 50 people in one theater accepted Christ after seeing the film, calling it "one of many, many stories" of people affected by the film.

=== Critical response ===
On Rotten Tomatoes, the film holds an approval rating of 59% based on reviews from 17 critics and an average rating of 6/10. On Metacritic the film has a weighted average score of 17 out of 100, based on 5 critics, indicating "overwhelming dislike". Audiences polled by CinemaScore gave the film a rare average grade of "A+" on an A+ to F scale. While Deadline Hollywood noted it had become "standard" for faith-based films, Kendrick became just the second director (after Rob Reiner) to have three different films earn the score.

Tara McNamara of Common Sense Media rated Overcomer 4 out of 5 stars, writing that "Kendrick's work improves with every film, and he deserves his seat at the head of the faith-based film table." She does criticize the movie's "racial stereotypes", however, and doubts the necessity of Alex Kendrick's character. Kimber Myers of The Los Angeles Times gave the film a mixed review, saying the script "focuses more on tugging at the heartstrings instead of developing characters," but praising its "emotionally effective conclusion that might persuade even the cynics to its cause." Carlos Aguilar of TheWrap wrote "Sports-Centric Faith-Based Drama Preaches, Repetitively, to the Choir," saying that "The writing, the acting, even the lighting fails to turn the thudding messaging into something resembling cinematic entertainment."

== Accolades ==
Overcomer earned the Epiphany Prize® for Inspiring Movies at the 2020 MovieGuide Awards. Lead actress Aryn Wright-Thompson was also presented with the Grace Award.
