= Stephen Kendrick =

American screenwriter and film producer (born 1974)

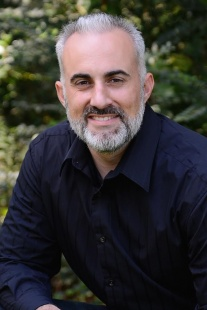
- Born: June 10, 1974 (age 51); Athens, Georgia, U.S.
- Occupations: Writer, film producer
- Notable work: War Room Fireproof
- Relatives: Alex Kendrick (brother) Shannon Kendrick (brother)
- Website: Kendrick Brothers Productions

Stephen Kendrick (born June 10, 1974) is an American screenwriter and film producer, co-writer of the book The Love Dare with brother Alex Kendrick, and former senior associate pastor at Sherwood Baptist Church in Albany, Georgia. Stephen, Shannon, and Alex Kendrick comprise Kendrick Brothers Productions.

== Filmography ==
Year	Title	Writer	Producer	Actor	Role
2003	Flywheel	Yes	Associate	No	—N/a
2006	Facing the Giants	Yes	Yes	Yes	Wiersbe Dunn Athletic Director
2008	Fireproof	Yes	Yes	Yes	Marine at Wreck
2011	Courageous	Yes	Yes	No	—N/a
2015	Beyond the Mask	Yes	No	No	—N/a
2015	War Room	Yes	Yes	Yes	Jump Rope Announcer
2018	Like Arrows	No	Executive	No	—N/a
2019	Overcomer	Yes	Yes	Yes	Starter
2021	Show Me the Father	No	Executive	Yes	Himself
2022	Lifemark	Yes	Executive	No	—N/a
2024	The Forge	Yes	Yes	No	—N/a
