= Alex Kendrick =

American Baptist minister, film director, and producer (born 1970)

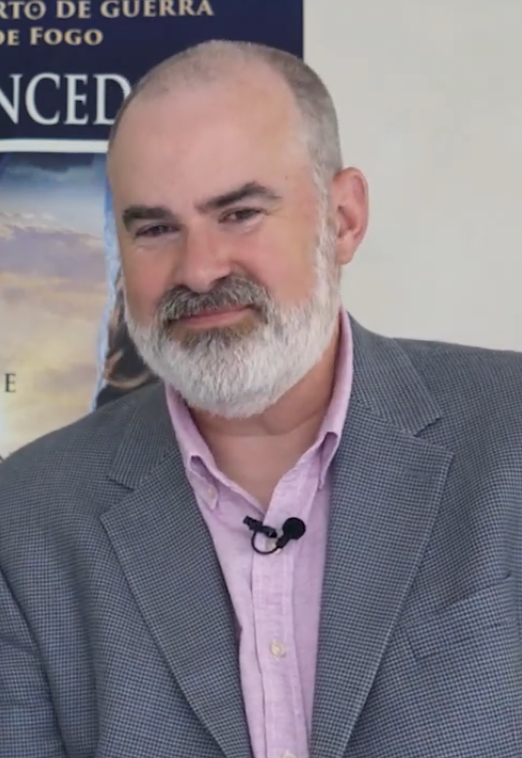
- Kendrick in 2019
- Born: June 11, 1970 (age 56); Athens, Georgia, U.S.
- Occupations: Actor, film director, screenwriter, film producer, pastor, entrepreneur
- Years active: 2003–present
- Notable work: War Room, Fireproof, Facing the Giants, Courageous, Overcomer, Flywheel
- Spouse: Christina Kendrick
- Children: 6
- Relatives: Stephen Kendrick (brother); Shannon Kendrick (brother); Larry Kendrick (father); Rhonwyn Kendrick (mother)
- Website: kendrickbrothers.com

Alexander Kendrick (born June 11, 1970) is an American pastor, film writer, producer, director, and actor. He is best known for directing and starring in notable faith-based films, including Facing the Giants, War Room, Overcomer, Courageous, and Fireproof. He is one of two film directors to have 4 films receive an "A+" grade on CinemaScore. Films directed by Kendrick have collectively grossed over $190 million worldwide.

== Biography ==
Alexander Kendrick was born in Athens, Georgia as the middle of three sons to Larry and Rhonwyn Kendrick. He grew up in Smyrna, Georgia. He studied at Kennesaw State University in communication and earned a B.A.. Kendrick worked as a Christian DJ for two radio stations before attending New Orleans Baptist Theological Seminary and being ordained into the ministry. He served as a minister to college students in Marietta, Georgia for four years.

From 1999 to 2014, Kendrick was an associate pastor at Sherwood Baptist Church in Albany, Georgia. In 2002, he founded Sherwood Pictures, a movie-creating entity, which produced Flywheel (2003), Facing the Giants (2006), Fireproof (2008), and Courageous (2011).

He has co-authored several best-selling books with his brother Stephen, including The Love Dare, which appeared for 131 weeks on The New York Times Paperback Advice & Misc. Best Seller list. His books The Resolution for Men and The Battle Plan for Prayer, again with his brother, also appeared on the New York Times Best Seller list.

In 2013, he founded Kendrick Brothers Productions with his brother Stephen.

Kendrick's fifth film War Room was a box office number-one in its second weekend of release in the United States.

On March 8, 2018, the Kendrick brothers announced via their website that their sixth movie, Overcomer, was in the works, and would unpack a pivotal issue that affects adults and students alike. Filming was begun in the summer of 2018, and the film was released by Sony Pictures on August 23, 2019.

In late 2019, subsequent to Overcomer's release in August, Alex and Stephen Kendrick announced that they would be shooting their next film in the summer of 2020. It is to be based on a true story, and the Kendricks are to executive produce.

== Personal life ==
Alex Kendrick married his wife, Christina, and moved to Albany, Georgia where he served as Associate Pastor of Media at Sherwood Baptist Church. Alex and his wife now have six children.

== Film career ==
Upon reading a survey stating that films had become more influential than churches, Kendrick set out to change the perception of movies in mainstream America. He co-wrote (with brother Stephen Kendrick), directed and acted in all four movies Sherwood Pictures has produced. Their first film was called Flywheel. Their second film, Facing the Giants, grossed over $10 million at the box office. The football feature became the best-selling Christian DVD of 2007. His third film, Fireproof, grossed $33.5 million, making it the highest-grossing independent film of 2008. The project went on to win Best Feature at the 2009 San Antonio Independent Christian Film Festival, as well as the Epiphany Prize at the Movieguide Awards in Los Angeles. The fourth feature film by Sherwood Pictures, Courageous, distributed by TriStar, was released in theaters in September 2011 and grossed $34.5 million. The film won Best Feature Film and the Jubilee Award at the 2012 San Antonio Independent Christian Film Festival as well as the Epiphany Prize at the 2012 Movieguide Awards. Courageous was also the first winner of the K-Love Movie Impact Award (presented in 2013) and winner of the first Dove Award for Movie of the Year (also presented in 2013). Kendrick also appeared in the 2013 film The Lost Medallion and the 2014 film Moms' Night Out.

The Kendrick brothers' fifth film, War Room, was released in theaters across the United States on August 28, 2015. It focuses on the transformational role that prayer can play in an individual's life. The cast includes New York Times best-selling author and Bible teacher Priscilla Shirer in her film debut, along with T.C. Stallings, Alex Kendrick, comedian Michael Jr., and Karen Abercrombie. It introduces newcomer Alena Pitts as Danielle and features a cameo by renowned Bible teacher and author Beth Moore in her first acting role. Provident Films and AFFIRM films partnered with the Kendrick brothers to release the film in theaters. Sony Pictures again handled distribution.

Movie critic Phil Boatwright, a Baptist Press columnist, said of the Kendricks: "One gets the impression this is their ministry, while at the same time understanding the No. 1 rule of cinematic storytelling -- story must come first." Movie reviewer Michael Foust said in a Baptist Press feature on the Kendricks: "They've been the Lewis and Clark of the genre. No, they weren't the first to make faith movies, but they did it better than anyone who came before -- and Hollywood noticed. They were trailblazers who made first-class movies on shoestring budgets." Foust added, "Even more impressive, the Kendricks have continued to improve on their craft. War Room was better than Courageous, which was better than Fireproof, which was better than Facing the Giants, which was better than Flywheel. Remember: War Room was the No. 1 movie at the box office in its second weekend in 2015. That's an accomplishment that many well-known Hollywood directors haven't achieved. The Kendricks also have been models of humility, giving all credit to God while working to help raise up the next generation of filmmakers."

== Filmography ==
Year	Title	Director	Writer	Producer	Editor	Actor	Role	Notes
2003	Flywheel	Yes	Yes	Yes	Yes	Yes	Jay Austin	Also cinematographer, composer and executive producer
2006	Facing the Giants	Yes	Yes	Yes	Yes	Yes	Grant Taylor	Also composer
2008	Fireproof	Yes	Yes	Yes	Yes	Yes	Pastor Strauss	
2011	Courageous	Yes	Yes	No	Yes	Yes	Adam Mitchell	
2013	The Lost Medallion: The Adventures of Billy Stone	No	No	No	No	Yes	Daniel	Also additional editor
2014	Moms' Night Out	No	No	No	No	Yes	Pastor Ray	
2015	War Room	Yes	Yes	No	Yes	Yes	Coleman Young	
2015	Faith of Our Fathers	No	No	No	Yes	No	—N/a	
2018	Like Arrows	No	Yes	Executive	No	Yes	42 year old Josh	
2019	Overcomer	Yes	Yes	No	Yes	Yes	John Harrison	
2021	Show Me the Father	No	No	Executive	No	Yes	Himself	
2022	Lifemark	No	Yes	Executive	Yes	Yes	Shawn Cates	
2024	The Forge	Yes	Yes	No	Yes	No	—N/a	

== Book career ==
In addition to filmmaking, Kendrick has co-written five novels from his films, the last four of which became bestsellers. The first three were written with his brother, Stephen, and novelist Eric Wilson. The fourth novel, Courageous, was written with Randy Alcorn. The fifth novel, for the film War Room, was written with Chris Fabry. The Love Dare made The New York Times Paperback Advice & Misc. bestseller list for 131 weeks, reaching number one twice. The Love Dare has sold over 6 million copies. In October 2011, the novel for Courageous was listed on The New York Times Best Seller list, along with his book The Resolution for Men, which was written with his brother, Stephen. In 2013, the brothers released The Love Dare for Parents, which became a CBA Best Seller. Kendrick reached the New York Times Best Seller List again in 2015 with his most recent book, The Battle Plan for Prayer, written with his brother.

=== Charts ===
- #7 non-fiction on Amazon.ca (Canadian)
- #1 twice on the New York Times Best Seller list

== Awards and nominations ==
=== Movieguide Awards ===
Year	Nominee / work	Award	Result
2012	Courageous	Most Inspiring Performance in Movies	Won

== See also ==
- Directors with three films rated A+ by CinemaScore
