= Flywheel (film) =

- Film poster
- Directed by: Alex Kendrick
- Written by: Alex Kendrick; Stephen Kendrick
- Produced by: Alex Kendrick
- Starring: Alex Kendrick; Lisa Arnold; Tracy Goode
- Cinematography: Tracy Goode; Alex Kendrick
- Edited by: Alex Kendrick; Mark Mitchell
- Music by: Alex Kendrick; Heather Spencer; Mark Willard
- Production company: Sherwood Pictures
- Release date: April 9, 2003
- Running time: 120 minutes
- Country: United States
- Language: English
- Budget: $20,000
- Box office: $37,000

Flywheel is a 2003 American Christian drama film directed by Alex Kendrick, who co-wrote the screenplay with Stephen Kendrick and stars in the lead role. It is the first feature film produced by Sherwood Pictures.

== Plot ==
Jay Austin is a dishonest car salesman whose practices strain his marriage, alienate his son, and leave his car dealership near foreclosure. One day while flipping television channels, he sees a pastor preaching that "you're in the shape you're in today because of the choices you've made." Jay becomes convicted by his behavior and resolves to run his business honestly.

Jay apologizes to Judy and his son and decides to sell cars honestly from that point on. However, he is now thousands of dollars in debt and facing the loss of his dealership if he can't catch up on his payments to the bank. Jay decides not to worry about his situation and to "let God handle it," telling the Lord that it is His lot. After the two rotund salesmen, whose interactions often provide comedy, leave over a disagreement about the newly reformed business practices, a young, innocent-looking "newcomer" Kevin Cantrell (Daniel Titus) comes to Jay to work for six weeks and asks him questions about his business practices. When asked about not making as much money as he could and pushing customers to make more profit Jay responds he "must live with how he runs the business and if you treat people right it'll come back to you." Sales are honest, but the amounts are mediocre at best. Kevin leaves after the six weeks, but later Jay sees himself on television as part of a news investigation on car dealerships. Kevin was a carefully concealed undercover agent investigating which car dealers cheat, and the report says that Jay Austin Motors was the only honest dealership among them. The next day Jay comes to the lot and sees 30 people there to buy his cars. Jay even has to call Judy to help sell all the cars on the lot that day. The total of the sales above the cost of the cars is enough to cover the demands of the banker, who comes later that day and wonders where all the cars have gone.

Business continues to be brisk, and then Jay begins to feel convicted in his conscience about his dishonesty during the prior two years that he had been in business. With his wife's encouragement he decides to make restitution to all the customers he had overcharged. He also finds that the amount due them was the same as the profit he had after all the bills and salaries.

Shortly thereafter, Jay is asked to do another live television interview, this time with reporter Hillary Vale (Lisa Arnold) of WALB-TV. On camera, Jay sees his now former employee Bernie saying that Jay Austin is a cheater, leading Hillary to say that the viewers "will just have to decide for themselves." However, many of his old customers (presumably all seeing the news) to whom Jay had just made restitution wasted no time to visit the lot to tell Hillary that there is more to the story. Hillary broadcasts an update 30 minutes after the prior live newscast to reflect the lot's new visitations.

At home Jay's wife and son, who had been praying for Jay since the first report, also see this latest development on television, and then his wife starts to feel contractions. Jay exits the lot and rushes home to bring his wife to the hospital. She gives birth to a girl named Faith, to stand as a living reminder of Jay's newfound faith in God. At the end of the film, Jay drives away with his son in his 1958 Triumph TR3, an acquisition at the beginning of the film, which Max (Walter Burnett), his mechanic, had repaired with a newly installed flywheel (thus the film's title).

== Cast ==
- Alex Kendrick as Jay Austin
- Janet Lee Dapper as Judy Austin
- Roger Breland as Mr. Austin
- Richie Hunnewell as Todd Austin
- Lisa Arnold as Hillary Vale
- Walter Burnett as Max Kendall
- Tracy Goode as Bernie Meyers
- Rutha Mae Harris as Katie Harris
- Treavor Lokey as Vince Berkeley
- Steve Moore as Dan Michaels
- Marc Keenan as Sam Jones
- Daniel Titus as Kevin Cantrell
- Mac George as George MacDonald

== Production ==
Filming of Flywheel began in November 2002 and continued into 2003. Produced by the Sherwood Baptist Church in Albany, Georgia, the film was shot digitally to reduce costs. The production had a budget of $20,000 and used church members as cast and crew. According to Stephen Kendrick, the filmmakers used "one Canon XL1s camera, G4 Mac computers and some Final Cut Pro editing software."

== Release ==
It was released to theaters on April 9, 2003, first to a Carmike Theatre in Albany, Georgia, and a director's cut DVD was released on November 13, 2007.

Flywheel was released through Carmike Cinemas in Tifton and Columbus, Georgia. The film ultimately grossed $37,000 theatrically. It was novelized by suspense writer Eric Wilson and published by Thomas Nelson in 2008.

=== DVD release ===
Flywheel: Director's Cut was released to DVD on November 13, 2007. DVD sales of the film were more successful, with more than 300,000 copies sold. The director's cut included an eight-part Bible study as one of its special features. Stephen Kendrick said, "They are color correcting [the director's cut of] Flywheel. They are adding better sound effects and some things like that. Adding a director's commentary. It will be a director's cut version. A new cover on it, adding a couple of extra languages." Six minutes of the film were removed, making the running time 114 minutes.

== Reception ==
Rotten Tomatoes reports that 82% of audiences liked the film. Flywheel won awards at the 2004 WYSIWYG Film Festival, 2004 ICVM Crown Awards and 2004 Sabaoth International Film Festival.

=== Awards ===
- 2004 WYSIWYG Film Festival
  - Best Feature Film
- 2004 ICVM Crown Awards
  - Best Evangelistic Film
  - Best Screenplay
  - Best Drama under $250,000
- 2004 Sabaoth International Film Festival
  - Best Screenplay
  - Best Production
  - Parable Award

== Remake ==
A remake of the film set in Brazil titled Flywheel: Ignition of the Soul is in the works and will be released in theaters on October 16, 2026.
