= Facing the Giants =

2006 film by Alex Kendrick

- Theatrical release poster
- Directed by: Alex Kendrick
- Written by: Alex Kendrick; Stephen Kendrick
- Produced by: Stephen Kendrick; Alex Kendrick; David Nixon
- Starring: Alex Kendrick; Shannen Fields; Tracy Goode; James Blackwell; Bailey Cave; Jim McBride; Jason McLeod; Christopher "C-willy" Willis
- Cinematography: Bob Scott
- Edited by: Ryan Hensley; Alex Kendrick
- Music by: Alex Kendrick; Mark Willard
- Production companies: Sherwood Pictures; Provident Films; Caramel Entertainment
- Distributed by: Samuel Goldwyn Films; Destination Films
- Release date: September 29, 2006
- Running time: 111 minutes
- Country: United States
- Language: English
- Budget: $100,000
- Box office: $10.2 million

Facing the Giants is a 2006 American Christian drama sports film directed by and starring Alex Kendrick. The supporting cast was composed of volunteers from Sherwood Baptist Church, and it is the second film that Sherwood Pictures has done. Shot in Albany, Georgia, the film tells an underdog story about American football from a Christian worldview. The film made $10.2 million on a $100,000 budget.

== Plot ==
In 2003, Grant Taylor is the head football coach of the Shiloh Christian Academy Eagles, which has yet to make the state playoffs or even post a winning record in his six-year tenure. After his seventh season begins with a three-game losing streak, a key player transfers to another school, and the remaining players' fathers begin pushing for his firing. This is not the only problem Grant faces; his home has an unidentifiable awful smell, his appliances are breaking down, he is facing hair-loss issues, and his car is an unreliable embarrassment. Then, crushingly, he learns that he is the reason that his wife, Brooke, cannot become pregnant.

Suffering intense emotional turmoil, Grant stays up all night praying and studying scripture. Finally, his old football coach inspires him to create a new coaching philosophy, which praises God regardless of on-field results. At the same time he influences his players to give far greater effort and tells them they can win under God's guidance. The improved attitudes of his players influence the rest of the school. From then on, the Eagles win all their remaining regular season games and qualify for the state playoffs.

Subsequently, things improve for Grant personally. He gets a raise in pay, solves his house odor problem, and is given a fully paid-for new truck to replace his old car.

The Eagles lose their playoff opener but are awarded the win by forfeit after their opponents used ineligible players. The Eagles then advance all the way to the state championship game against the three-time and defending state champion Richland Giants.

Before the championship game, Brooke visits her gynecologist because of morning sickness. She gets a pregnancy test which at first is thought to be another failure, but then her nurse realizes she was reading another patient's results. She then runs to tell Brooke the good news as she is leaving.

In the game, the Giants race out to a 14–0 lead, but the Eagles manage to tie the game at the start of the second half. The Giants tack on another touchdown and a field goal before the Eagles manage to score another touchdown.

As the clock winds down, the Giants come within one yard of sealing the game with a touchdown. Defensive lineman Brock Kelley is exhausted and begs someone else to lead, but Grant encourages him to give him four more downs. Brock agrees, and the Eagles manage to get a sack, a stop, and a pass block, taking it to 4th down. In a bit of arrogance, Richland head coach Bobby Lee Duke, insisting on a touchdown to put the game away (when a field goal would have sealed the victory), calls for the Giants to go for it. However, Brock causes a fumble, and the Eagles take it to the 34-yard line with 2 seconds to go.

Grant, realizing again that they cannot outrun or overpower the Giants and that a desperation pass play would probably be unsuccessful, decides to take a huge gamble and asks for a 51-yard field goal (into the wind) from kicker David Childers, who was forced to take over when the starting kicker was knocked out early in the second half. David insists he can't kick that far but goes out there anyway. After a rousing speech from Grant, another bit of arrogance by Duke (who calls a timeout to "ice" Childers), and seeing his father Larry Childers, who is a wheelchair user, stand beyond the fence holding his arms up, David begs for God to help him with the kick. Seemingly in response, the wind suddenly turns favorable, and Grant tells them to kick it. David's kick barely clears the uprights, allowing the Eagles to stun the Giants and win the game.

After the game, Grant tells his players that they are not inferior or lacking in ability, and that nothing is impossible with God. Later that night, Brooke reveals that she's finally pregnant, causing Grant to break down in tears of joy. Two years later, it is revealed that they have a young son, with another child on the way, and in the interim, the Eagles have won a second state title.

== Cast ==
- Alex Kendrick as Grant Taylor
- Shannen Fields as Brooke Taylor
- Bill Butler as Neil Prater
- Bailey Cave as David Childers
- Steve Williams as Larry Childers
- Tracy Goode as Brady Owens
- Jim McBride as Bobby Lee Duke
- Tommy McBride as Jonathan Weston
- Jason McLeod as Brock Kelley
- Chris "C-Willy" Willis as J.T. Hawkins Jr.
- Ray Wood as Mr. Bridges
- Erin Bethea as Alicia Houston
- David Nixon as Mr. Jones
- Mark Richt as himself & former coach of Grant Taylor

Most of the cast and crew were members of Sherwood Baptist Church in Albany, Georgia. For example, the role of Bobby Lee Duke, the opposing coach in the state final, was played by Sherwood Baptist associate pastor Jim McBride.

== Production ==
The movie was shot on high definition digital video tape (using the Panasonic Varicam), and transferred to film. Using real high school football teams, the football action sequences were shot by the film's director of photography, Bob Scott, who is a veteran cinematographer for NFL Films. Another NFL Films technician, Rob Whitehurst, recorded the movie's sound. Principal photography began on April 27, 2004.

== Soundtrack ==
Facing the Giants: Original Motion Picture Soundtrack

Film score
- Released: October 3, 2006
- Genre: Christian

Track listing

1. Come Together - Third Day
2. Voice of Truth - Casting Crowns
3. Facing the Giants Theme (Score) - Mark Willard, Alex Kendrick
4. Finding You - Bebo Norman
5. The Deathcrawl (Score) - Mark Willard
6. Completely - Ana Laura
7. A Gift from God (Score) - Mark Willard
8. Come on Back to Me - Third Day
9. Never Give Up on Me - Josh Bates
10. The Fight (Score) - Mark Willard
11. With You - Mark Willard, Mark Harris
12. Attempting the Impossible (Score) - Mark Willard, Alex Kendrick

== Release ==
The film was released to DVD in early 2007 and made its television debut on September 21, 2008, on Trinity Broadcasting Network.

== Reception ==
=== Critical reception ===
The film received mostly negative reviews from mainstream critics. On Rotten Tomatoes, 17% of critics have given the film a positive review based on 24 reviews, with an average rating of 4.50/10. The site's critics consensus reads, "The tropes of both football and evangelical movies are gracelessly on parade in this banal, insipid drama." On Metacritic, the film has a weighted average score of 38 out of 100 based on reviews from 4 critics, indicating "generally unfavorable" reviews.

Heather Boerner of Common Sense Media rated the film 3 out of 5 stars, categorizing it as "a heartwarming if overly religious story of faith" and saying its message would "speak to born-again men and their families, but, again, not their less-religious neighbors." Joel Rosenblatt of The Austin Chronicle, on the other hand, rated it 1 out of 5 stars, writing "Its feel-good storyline, shopworn message, and bottomless sermonizing would have played better in Sunday school than on the big screen, which is -- let's face it -- Babylon's turf."

=== Box office ===
In its first weekend, the film opened on 441 screens nationwide in the United States. Despite such a small number of theaters, the film opened in twelfth place with $1,343,537. The film ultimately grossed a total of $10,243,159. The film opened in South Korea on April 16, 2010, eventually grossing $64,828. DVD sales have totaled 2.3 million units sold in 57 countries.

=== Rating controversy ===
In May 2006, the producers of Facing the Giants received notice from the Motion Picture Association of America (MPAA) that the film would be receiving a "Parental Guidance Suggested" rating, or PG rating, for "some thematic elements". The Drudge Report picked up the story on June 8, 2006, which sparked a controversy alleging that the film was being given a "PG" rating solely because of its religious theme.

According to the film's producers, they were told the motion picture received a PG rating because of its strong religious themes and because it elevated one religion over another. The MPAA later explained that Facing the Giants contains football violence and also deals with the mature topics of infertility and depression.

The Kendrick brothers expected the PG rating because of the movie's mature themes and did not appeal the board's rating.

== See also ==
- List of American football films
