= Fireproof (film) =

2008 film by Alex and Stephen Kendrick

- Theatrical release poster
- Directed by: Alex Kendrick
- Screenplay by: Alex Kendrick; Stephen Kendrick
- Story by: Alex Kendrick; Stephen Kendrick
- Produced by: Alex Kendrick; Stephen Kendrick; David Nixon
- Starring: Kirk Cameron; Erin Bethea; Ken Bevel
- Cinematography: Bob Scott
- Edited by: Alex Kendrick; Bill Ebel
- Music by: Mark Willard
- Production company: Sherwood Pictures
- Distributed by: Samuel Goldwyn Films; Affirm Films
- Release date: September 26, 2008
- Running time: 122 minutes
- Country: United States
- Language: English
- Budget: $500,000
- Box office: $33.5 million

Fireproof is a 2008 American independent Christian drama film directed by Alex Kendrick, who co-wrote and co-produced it with Stephen Kendrick, released by Samuel Goldwyn Films and Affirm Films (the company's first film). The film stars Kirk Cameron, Erin Bethea, and Ken Bevel.

Although the film received generally unfavorable reviews from film critics, Fireproof was successful at the box office, becoming a surprise hit, debuting at No. 4 and grossing over $33 million. It received awards from evangelical Christian organizations, including the Best Feature Film award at the 2009 San Antonio Independent Christian Film Festival.

== Plot ==
Married couple Caleb Holt, a fire captain serving the Albany Fire Department, and Catherine Holt, a hospital administrator, are experiencing marital difficulties. At work, Caleb underscores the importance of never leaving one's partner behind, but at home, he and Catherine argue constantly. Catherine accuses Caleb of being selfish because he prioritizes his desire for an unnecessary and expensive boat, and leaves her to consider how to pay for needed medical equipment for her ailing mother. She is also frustrated with his addiction to internet pornography and leaving her to handle all the home responsibilities and overheads herself. Caleb feels attacked. Their constant arguing escalates to the point where Caleb loses his temper and lashes out verbally. Consequently, Catherine wants a divorce, to which an enraged Caleb agrees.

Caleb's best friend and fellow firefighter, Michael, and Caleb's father, John, convince him to hold off on divorce proceedings. His father persuades him to try the Love Dare, a 40-day challenge for marriage improvement wherein a spouse alters the way they treat their partner. Caleb reluctantly agrees, though he decides not to tell Catherine. At the hospital where she works, Catherine has been openly flirting with Dr. Gavin Keller.

Caleb begins The Love Dare halfheartedly, viewing the tasks as more of a checklist than mutual outreach while ignoring the bible verses written in the pages. Meanwhile, nurses at Catherine's hospital warn her not to trust Caleb, as they believe he is trying to butter her up to secure a more favorable divorce settlement. With encouragement from his father and Michael, Caleb continues, and upon a discussion with his Christian father, Caleb understands the death of Jesus Christ for his sins and becomes a Christian. Catherine still eschews his affections and grows closer to Dr. Keller. Finding Catherine unmoved, Caleb is consoled by his father, while Michael reveals that he was divorced before marrying his current wife. During a firefighter rescue, Caleb sustains burns on the job, is admitted to the hospital where his wife works, and is treated by Dr. Keller. During treatment, Dr. Keller discovers that Catherine is married to Caleb, but continues his affections. With renewed faith, Caleb continues The Love Dare, even destroying his home computer to remove his pornographic addictions and temptations, replacing it with red roses for Catherine. However, Catherine gives him an envelope with a petition for divorce, leaving Caleb heartbroken.

Catherine discovers that her mother's medical equipment costs have been paid anonymously and erroneously believes it was Dr. Keller, bringing them even closer. Caleb eventually discovers the burgeoning affair and discreetly confronts the doctor. After Caleb leaves, Dr. Keller pulls out a wedding band, revealing to the audience that he is also married, and abandons his pursuit of Catherine.

Catherine confronts Caleb after discovering his Love Dare journal, and he reveals to her that he has completed the challenge but is still following its guidelines. Despite Caleb's heartfelt apology, Catherine says she still needs time to reconsider the divorce. She later discovers that Caleb used his boat savings to pay for new medical equipment for her mother, with Dr. Keller only contributing $300.00. Moved by Caleb's selflessness, Catherine reconciles with him. Caleb discovers that his mother, whom he has treated poorly, did The Love Dare for his father, rather than vice versa as Caleb had originally thought. Realizing his bad behavior, he offers her an emotional apology and she forgives him. The film ends with Caleb and Catherine renewing their wedding vows on the foundation of Jesus Christ.

== Cast ==
- Kirk Cameron as Caleb Holt, captain of the Albany Fire Department's Station One
- Erin Bethea as Catherine Holt, Caleb's wife, who works as a public relations director for Phoebe Putney Memorial Hospital
  - Chelsea Noble (uncredited) as Catherine Holt's body double, who appeared in the scene where Caleb and Catherine reconcile, as Cameron will not kiss any woman but his wife.
- Harris Malcom as John Holt, Caleb's father
- Ken Bevel as Lt. Michael Simmons
- Jason McLeod as Eric Harmon, a rookie firefighter
- Alex Kendrick as Pastor Strauss
- Perry Revell as Dr. Gavin Keller

The film's supporting cast also included nearly 1,200 volunteers from Sherwood Baptist Church.

== Production ==
Principal photography for Fireproof took place during October–December 2007 in 16 locations, all of which were donated. Craig von Buseck of the Christian Broadcasting Network said that the film was, "beautifully shot in and around Albany, Georgia, home to Sherwood Baptist Church." The Albany Fire Department donated its fire station locations, trucks and even some of its crew for use during the filming. The producers were also given use of a train and a hospital wing. The film's cast and crew were made up of 1,200 volunteers, along with a professional film crew of eight who worked below rate.

== Soundtrack ==
Fireproof: Original Motion Picture Soundtrack

Soundtrack album by Various
- Released: July 14, 2009
- Genre: Christian
- Length: 57 minutes
- Label: Provident Label Group

The film soundtrack for Fireproof was released on July 14, 2009. It features songs by Christian groups and artists, such as Casting Crowns and Third Day, as well as highlights of the film's score, composed by Mark Willard.

1. "Brighter Days" – Leeland (3:44)
2. "This is Who I Am" – Third Day (2:32)
3. "On the Tracks" (6:08)
4. "The Love Dare" (1:02)
5. "Slow Fade" – Casting Crowns (4:40)
6. "Not Good Enough" (1:00)
7. "What You Don't Have" (2:37)
8. "House Fire" (6:01)
9. "While I'm Waiting" – John Waller (4:52)
10. "Temptation" (2:52)
11. "The Apology" (2:43)
12. "Personal Sacrifice" (3:48)
13. "You Belong to Me" – Grey Holiday (1:50)
14. "She Did It To Me" (1:50)
15. "Love Is Not a Fight (Movie Version)" – Warren Barfield (4:28)
16. Bonus Track: "While I'm Waiting" (Fireproof Remix) – John Waller (4:49)

== Release ==
=== Marketing ===
Instead of marketing with television spots and billboards, Fireproof's marketers invited Christian publications to the set and screened the film early for pastors and church groups. Meyer Gottlieb, president of Samuel Goldwyn Films said, "The marketing is more grass roots."

=== Box office ===
Fireproof's advance sales accounted for 40% of all Fandango sales the week before the film opened. It was released on September 27, 2008, in 839 theaters and grossed $6,836,036 in its opening weekend, placing at No. 4. During its run, Fireproof had a domestic gross of $33,456,317, more than triple the lifetime earnings of its predecessor, Facing the Giants. It was the highest grossing independent film of 2008.

=== Critical reception ===
According to the review aggregator website Rotten Tomatoes, 38% of critics have given the film a positive review based on 21 reviews, with an average rating of 4.35/10. Metacritic gave it a score of 28 out of 100 based on 6 reviews, signifying "generally unfavorable" reviews. Ed Gonzalez of LA Weekly said, "Fireproof stops becoming relatable to us all and only to the already, or easily, indoctrinated." Frank Scheck of The Hollywood Reporter said, "While hardly sophisticated in its approach and certainly not polished in its technical elements, the film does get its heartfelt message across with undeniable sincerity. Its success at the box office, which will no doubt continue on home video, demonstrates that there's no shortage of filmgoers dissatisfied with cynical Hollywood product."

Josh Rosenblatt of The Austin Chronicle criticized the film's story, saying it "makes for fruitful soul-fishing but lousy drama." Joe Leydon of Variety gave the film a positive review, saying, "Cameron is genuinely compelling as Caleb, a work-obsessed firefighter on the verge of divorce from his neglected wife." Cheryl Dickow of the Catholic Exchange said, "I feel it is necessary to send a message to Catholics everywhere that this is a movie worth seeing."

=== Home media ===
Fireproof was released to DVD on January 27, 2009, and to Blu-ray on September 29, 2009. Included as special features are deleted scenes, bloopers, behind-the-scenes making-of featurettes, and a commentary by the Kendrick Brothers. On its first weekend of DVD release, it ranked third in retail sales and fifth in rentals with a rental index of 51.02. Through January 2016, it made $54.9 million in DVD sales.

== Accolades ==
2009 San Antonio Independent Christian Film Festival

- Best Feature Film
- Runner up for Best of Festival.

17th Annual Movieguide Faith & Values Awards Gala

- $100,000 Epiphany Prize

The Dove Foundation's Crystal Seal Awards

- Best Drama

== See also ==
- The Bible in film
- Christian cinema
- Firefighting in the United States
- List of Christian films
