= List of Growing Pains episodes =

This is a list of episodes for the American television sitcom Growing Pains, created by Neal Marlens for ABC. During the course of the series, 166 episodes of Growing Pains aired over seven seasons, between September 24, 1985, and April 25, 1992.

== Series overview ==
Season	Episodes	Originally released		Rank	Rating
Season	Episodes	First released	Last released	Rank	Rating
1	22	September 24, 1985	May 13, 1986	17	19.5 (Note: Tied with Knots Landing)
2	22	September 30, 1986	May 19, 1987	8	22.7
3	26	September 18, 1987	May 4, 1988	5	21.3
4	22	October 18, 1988	May 3, 1989	13	17.6 (Note: Tied with L.A. Law)
5	26	September 20, 1989	May 2, 1990	21	15.4
6	24	September 19, 1990	April 24, 1991	27	14.3 (Note: Tied with Baby Talk and Davis Rules)
7	24	September 18, 1991	April 25, 1992	75	8.6

== Episodes ==
=== Season 1 (1985–1986) ===
No. overall	No. in season	Title	Directed by	Written by	Original release date	Prod. code	Rating/share (households)
1	1	"Pilot"	John Pasquin	Neal Marlens	September 24, 1985	206740	18.5/28
Maggie goes back to work as a journalist, leaving Jason to take care of the kids. When Mike gets arrested for crashing into a police car, Jason takes his anger and disappointment out on everybody and everything around him.
2	2	"Springsteen"	John Pasquin	David Kendall	October 1, 1985	185803	19.6/30
Mike tries desperately to get tickets to a Bruce Springsteen concert and is ecstatic when Jason gets them. However, he does not seem as enthusiastic when a news report shows Mike with his father enjoying the concert.
3	3	"Jealousy"	John Pasquin	Carol Black & Neal Marlens	October 8, 1985	185801	21.5/32
Jason becomes suspicious that Maggie is doing more with a co-worker (Tom O'Rourke) than working on a story.
4	4	"Carol's Article"	John Pasquin	Sybil Adelman & Martin Sage	October 15, 1985	185804	21.0/31
Carol auditions for her school paper, but is angered when her mother doesn't give her a good review. Meanwhile, Mike and Ben get on a winning streak betting on horses.
5	5	"Superdad!"	Nick Havinga	Tom Walla & Dave Wollert	October 29, 1985	185805	18.6/28
With Maggie's increased workload, Jason takes on more responsibilities at home and gives Carol boy-trouble advice. Maggie is uptight with Jason for being more involved with the kids...after she urged Jason to do just that. Olivia d'Abo guest stars.
6	6	"Mike's Madonna Story"	John Pasquin	Carol Black & Neal Marlens	November 5, 1985	185802	20.4/29
Mike becomes romantically attracted to a "Madonna look-alike" (Dana Plato), which worries Maggie; Ben accidentally ruins Carol's plant project.
7	7	"Weekend Fantasy"	John Tracy	Arnold Margolin	November 12, 1985	185808	18.6/27
Jason and Maggie leave Mike in charge while they go on a weekend trip. But when there's no answer when Maggie and Jason call home, they jump to practically every conclusion except the right one.
8	8	"Slice of Life"	John Tracy	Rich Reinhart	November 19, 1985	185809	18.8/27
After Jason reviews a marriage-compatibility test for his work, he and Maggie take it. They're in for some unpleasant surprises. Ami Dolenz plays Mike's almost karate partner.
9	9	"Carol's Crush"	John Tracy	Stephen J. Curwick	November 26, 1985	185810	18.7/27
Carol has blooming romantic feelings for an older family friend, including jealousy when he's romantically attracted to someone else.
10	10	"Dirt Bike"	John Tracy	Kerry Ehrin & Ali Marie Matheson	December 3, 1985	185811	15.8/23
Mike rides a dirt bike against his parents' wishes while camping with Boner.
11	11	"Standardized Test"	Nick Havinga	Carol Black & Neal Marlens	December 10, 1985	185806	17.0/25
Mike completely disregards an IQ test and gets a score that worries his parents.
12	12	"A Christmas Story"	John Tracy	Story by : Carol Black & Neal Marlens; Teleplay by : Tom Walla & Dave Wollert	December 17, 1985	185812	18.5/28
On Christmas Eve, Ben is having second thoughts about Santa Claus; a patient of Jason's (Alan Blumenfeld) threatens to take his life by jumping down the Seavers' chimney.
13	13	"The Love Song of M. Aaron Seaver"	John Tracy	Arnold Margolin	January 7, 1986	185814	21.5/31
Mike falls for a culturally refined and worldly, new student (April Lerman), whom he impresses with a post-modern poem written by Carol. Their next date is on an annual family bowling night.
14	14	"First Blood"	John Tracy	Mark Fink	January 14, 1986	185813	20.4/29
Ben's hockey team unfortunately features father-son bullies, the father being the team's coach (Dan Lauria); things only get worse when Ben's father gets involved. At home, Maggie teaches Mike how to ballroom-dance so he can escort his girlfriend to a family wedding.
15	15	"Slice of Life II"	John Tracy	Tom Walla & David Kendall	January 21, 1986	185815	20.6/30
When Maggie tells Jason she might be pregnant, Jason realizes he might not be emotionally ready.
16	16	"The Seavers vs. the Cleavers"	John Tracy	Susan Beavers	January 28, 1986	185817	23.2/33
Mike and Carol don't want their parents chaperoning a dance, so they're glad when they are actually told not to – until Carol finds out the PTA's objection to them. Guest starring Annette Funicello as Mrs. Hinkley. Keith Coogan guest stars.
17	17	"Charity Begins at Home"	John Tracy	Dan Guntzelman & Steve Marshall	February 18, 1986	185816	22.0/32
Ben does not have enough money to buy Jason the really good present he thinks he deserves, but Mike's advice causes him to accidentally commit a crime.
18	18	"Reputation"	John Tracy	David Kendall	February 25, 1986	185819	18.7/27
After writing answers on the bottom of his Reebok sneakers, Mike gets a 94 on his American History exam, stunning the class, his family and his teacher, who accuses him of cheating. Mike must retake the exam to prove he knew the material.
19	19	"The Anniversary That Never Was"	John Tracy	Timothy James	March 4, 1986	185818	21.4/32
Mike, Carol, and Ben want to give their parents a relaxing anniversary, but Maggie gets called to Washington for business. Farce occurs when Maggie flies home and Jason is on his way to her. Richard Sanders as a wacky airline passenger.
20	20	"Be a Man"	John Tracy	Rich Reinhart	March 11, 1986	185820	22.5/34
Home alone while the rest of the family goes to visit Maggie's parents, Mike throws an unsupervised party. The Malones (Gordon Jump, Betty McGuire) are having financial trouble and will not accept money from anyone, including their son-in-law. Ami Dolenz as a party guest.
21	21	"Career Decision"	John Tracy	Story by : Bob Brush; Teleplay by : Tom Walla	May 6, 1986	185821	19.7/33
When Maggie brings Carol to work, Carol has to witness Maggie's humiliation over a mistake she made in an article. Meanwhile, Mike realizes that the world does not revolve around him, while watching TV reruns of Gilligan's Island.
22	22	"Extra Lap"	John Tracy	Stephen J. Curwick	May 13, 1986	185807	18.8/31
Jokester Uncle Bob dies in his sleep during a visit; after the funeral, Mike believes that he is seeing his ghost (James Callahan).

=== Season 2 (1986–1987) ===
No. overall	No. in season	Title	Directed by	Written by	Original release date	Prod. code	Rating/share (households)
23	1	"Jason and the Cruisers"	John Tracy	Tom Walla	September 30, 1986	185962	22.7/34
Maggie reunites Jason with his former band when he starts to feel old.
24	2	"Fast Times at Dewey High"	Dan Guntzelman	David Kendall	October 21, 1986	185963	21.4/31
Mike finds himself with two dates for the school dance.
25	3	"Long Day's Journey Into Night"	John Tracy	David Kendall	October 28, 1986	185961	22.5/34
Carol is overjoyed when a popular girl (Katy Boyer) at school starts hanging out with her – until she finds out she is only interested in Mike.
26	4	"Call Me"	John Tracy	Tim O'Donnell	November 11, 1986	185965	24.8/36
Maggie and Jason recall how Ben got into trouble by calling a pornographic hotline, then blaming a neighbor kid for giving out the number.
27	5	"Employee of the Month"	John Tracy	Tom Walla	November 18, 1986	185967	22.2/33
Mike tries to help a co-worker (Olivia d'Abo) by taking responsibility for her frequent mistakes; after he is fired, he acts like he is still going to work. Danny Nucci guest stars as Mike's boss.
28	6	"Dream Lover"	John Tracy	Tim O'Donnell	November 25, 1986	185970	20.6/31
Carol tutors the captain of the football team, Bobby (Kevin Wixted). They begin to feel attracted to each other.
29	7	"Do You Believe in Magic?"	John Tracy	Melody Rowland	December 2, 1986	185969	20.3/29
After being conned out of $10 by Mike, Carol and Ben (with their parents' help) hatch an elaborate scheme to get it back.
30	8	"Jason's Rib"	John Tracy	Tom Walla	December 9, 1986	185971	19.6/29
Maggie feels belittled by Jason when they disagree about a school dress code during a parents' meeting.
31	9	"The Kid"	John Tracy	Tim O'Donnell	December 16, 1986	185972	24.1/36
Overwhelmed by the holiday spirit, Ben brings home a homeless teen (Hallie Todd). The teen, who snidely identifies herself as "Nancy Reagan", cops an attitude with the Seavers and sees a chance to rob their house. Has Ben made a mistake in being considerate, or will the Seavers' hospitality set the teen runaway straight?
32	10	"The Breakfast Club"	John Tracy	David Tyron King	January 6, 1987	185966	24.0/34
After Maggie insists that Mike be grounded for lying, she is caught in a lie herself and Jason suggests that she should ground herself to teach Mike a lesson. But this is one of those times when a punishment hurts the parent more than the child – Maggie will be missing a concert in Atlantic City by one of her favorites! While Maggie stays with Mike, Carol goes to Atlantic City with Jason so that the tickets will not go to waste.
33	11	"Choices"	John Tracy	Susan Beavers	January 13, 1987	185964	24.0/33
Maggie and Carol are thrilled when Carol gets a chance to skip a grade. Then Maggie wonders if her life choices might have given her daughter the wrong idea.
34	12	"Higher Education"	John Tracy	Susan Beavers	January 20, 1987	185973	24.2/34
Mike is blackmailed by a girl who helped change his grade on an English test so he would be allowed to go on a ski trip. When Jason and Maggie have colds, Carol runs the house a bit too well for Jason's liking.
35	13	"Some Enchanted Evening"	John Tracy	Susan Beavers	January 27, 1987	185976	25.4/37
Carol is eager for Bobby to invite her to the Dewey High winter formal, but he does not seem so eager. Meanwhile, Mike has three girls courting him to be their date.
36	14	"Thank You, Willie Nelson"	John Tracy	David Kendall	February 3, 1987	185974	23.0/34
Maggie's father sells his house without his wife's approval, causing a controversy between them. Mike and Ben attempt to find ways to mess with Carol's slumber party, against hers and their parents' wishes. In the end, it's Mike who gets messed with by the girls.
37	15	"Thank God It's Friday"	John Tracy	Dan Guntzelman & Steve Marshall	February 10, 1987	185975	24.3/36
Mike and his friends are pressured to take drugs at a college party. Kristy Swanson guest stars. Kirk Cameron does a PSA announcement on why Drugs are bad at the end of the episode.
38	16	"My Brother, Myself"	John Tracy	Susan Beavers	February 24, 1987	185981	21.3/29
Ben hits puberty and – with advice from Mike – tries to hit on his babysitter.
39	17	"Jimmy Durante Died for Your Sins"	John Tracy	Christopher Ames & Carolyn Shelby	March 3, 1987	185979	24.6/36
After Carol's parents tell her she can only get a nose job if she gets the money for it herself, she wins it in a radio contest.
40	18	"Carnival"	John Tracy	Sybil Adelman & Martin Sage	March 10, 1987	185968	22.6/33
Maggie volunteers to help out at Ben's school carnival but starts to ignore Ben and do it only for herself.
41	19	"The Awful Truth"	John Tracy	Kate Boutilier	March 17, 1987	185980	25.0/37
The kids believe that Jason was married before and Mike was the product of that marriage.
42	20	"Born Free"	John Tracy	Tim O'Donnell	March 31, 1987	185978	25.6/38
Jason and Mike go on a guys' trip to Boston so Jason can show Mike around his old college and convince him to go to college. But before they even get there, Mike gets some serious life experience during the flight.
43	21	"The Long Goodbye"	John Tracy	David Kendall & Tim O'Donnell	May 5, 1987	185982	18.8/31
Maggie believes that the Seavers' handyman (Douglas Seale) is getting too old (he's messing up more than he's fixing) and tries to convince Jason to let him go. Then they find out that somebody else was behind the mistakes. Candace Cameron as Jenny Foster.
44	22	"Confidentially Yours"	John Tracy	Tom Walla	May 19, 1987	185977	20.4/33
Maggie gets a job offer – from a womanizer (James Sloyan) who only wants to sleep with her.

=== Season 3 (1987–1988) ===
No. overall	No. in season	Title	Directed by	Written by	Original release date	Prod. code	Rating/share (households)
45	1	"Aloha: Parts 1 & 2"	John Tracy	Story by : Tom Walla; Teleplay by : Dan Guntzelman & Steve Marshall	September 18, 1987	186103	16.5/31
46	2	"Aloha: Parts 1 & 2"	John Tracy	Story by : Tom Walla; Teleplay by : Dan Guntzelman & Steve Marshall	September 18, 1987	186104	16.5/31
The Seavers journey to Kahului Airport in Hawaii but the holiday does not go as Jason planned. Maggie has work problems, Mike and Carol find romance, and Ben finds a new interest. Maggie solves her problem; initially shocked that his Hawaiian girlfriend (Kelly Hu) has a daughter, Mike enjoys babysitting her; Bobby arrives.
47	3	"Taking Care of Business"	John Tracy	Tim O'Donnell	September 22, 1987	186102	23.3/36
The family is supportive of the positive effects of Mike's job. Then Jason discovers his employers use bait-and-switch tactics.
48	4	"Not Necessarily the News"	John Tracy	Tim O'Donnell	September 29, 1987	186109	26.5/41
Maggie's family becomes anxious to find her a new job.
49	5	"Michaelgate"	John Tracy	Dan Guntzelman & Steve Marshall	October 6, 1987	186108	23.1/37
Mike is nominated for student-body president...and wins, much to his own astonishment (not to mention everybody else's).
50	6	"Big Brother is Not Watching"	John Tracy	David Tyron King	October 13, 1987	186101	24.6/38
Ben is told that, if he wants a new bike, he has to put up half the cost. So he turns to Carol for ideas on how to make a fast buck. Carol organizes a raffle of Ben's old bike, but the plan is derailed when some bullies threaten anyone from buying tickets to assure themselves of the prize. Ben and Carol get chastized by their parents, who must decide how to proceed. Guest starring Summer Phoenix as Jody.
51	7	"A Star Is Born"	John Tracy	Neal Marlens & David Kendall	October 27, 1987	186107	25.7/38
When class hottie Monica is chosen as Emily in a high school production of Our Town, Mike auditions and wins the role of George. He knows little about acting and can't get his lines down, but loves rehearsing the kissing scenes. Ironically, Mike and Monica save the play when their castmates (particularly Boner, Carol, Doosler, and Ben) all but wreck it.
52	8	"Gone But Not Forgotten"	John Tracy	Christopher Ames & Carolyn Shelby	November 3, 1987	186105	23.3/35
When the Seaver house is burglarized, the family fears the perpetrators' return.
53	9	"Who's Zoomin' Who?"	John Tracy	Tom Walla	November 10, 1987	186113	25.0/37
Carol's friends convince her to dump Bobby for the handsome new transfer student (Brad Pitt).
54	10	"This is Your Life"	John Tracy	David Kendall	November 17, 1987	186110	23.2/35
Ben is fearful of undergoing a tonsillectomy, so he escapes the surgery with the aid of a jovial taxi driver (Alan Hale Jr.). After coming home, he realizes he has been punished for his cowardice by being disinherited and replaced with a new, perfect-in-every-way Ben (Danny Cooksey).
55	11	"Broadway Bound"	John Tracy	Tim O'Donnell & Tom Walla	November 24, 1987	186115	20.7/31
Mike skips the local school play audition to audition for a Broadway play. Dawn Wells appears as a Casting Receptionist.
56	12	"The Scarlet Letter"	John Tracy	Kate Boutilier	December 1, 1987	186106	22.5/34
Carol doubts the purpose of education when she gets an A+ on an exam paper she bluffed her way through.
57	13	"A Reason to Live"	John Tracy	David Tyron King	December 8, 1987	186112	21.1/32
A troubled girl uses a school assignment with Mike and Boner to seek help from Jason.
58	14	"Nasty Habits"	John Tracy	Christopher Ames & Carolyn Shelby	December 15, 1987	186119	18.2/26
Mike's bad habits catch up with him and put him in danger of not graduating: he can't seem to start his English paper and even plans to go out the night before it's due.
59	15	"The Marrying Kind"	John Tracy	David Kendall	January 5, 1988	186114	23.9/34
Jason and Maggie are shocked when Carol announces her engagement to Bobby.
60	16	"State of the Union"	John Tracy	Kate Boutilier	January 12, 1988	186120	23.4/34
Jason and Maggie spend more and more time apart as Maggie's new job demands more and more of her time. Meanwhile, the family receives life-changing news: Maggie is pregnant.
61	17	"The Mom Who Knew Too Much"	John Tracy	Kate Boutilier	January 26, 1988	186111	24.0/34
Carol is furious with Maggie for telling Jason one of her most intimate secrets. Jason then confides in Carol a medical problem he has been hiding from Maggie.
62	18	"Great Expectations"	John Tracy	David Kendall	February 9, 1988	186122	24.0/34
A letter from the girl he met in Hawaii (Kelly Hu) has Mike scheming to go to Los Angeles without Jason and Maggie's knowledge.
63	19	"Dance Fever"	John Tracy	Tim O'Donnell	March 1, 1988	186117	23.7/34
64	20	"Dance Fever"	John Tracy	Tim O'Donnell	March 2, 1988	186118	20.0/30
While Maggie and Jason chaperone Mike and Carol's high-school dance, Ben goes in search of his manhood. In part 2, as Ben continues his quest for manhood, the high-school dance continues: Jason and Maggie compete to see which one is the better D.J.; Mike discovers he has values; and Carol learns to think for herself instead of going along with the crowd.
65	21	"Bringing Up Baby"	John Tracy	Tom Walla	March 9, 1988	186121	20.0/32
While the Seavers make room for baby #4, Maggie grasps for a way to tell her boss she's pregnant.
66	22	"The Obscure Objects of Our Desire: Parts 1 & 2"	John Tracy	David Kendall	March 30, 1988	186365A	18.1/29
67	23	"The Obscure Objects of Our Desire: Parts 1 & 2"	John Tracy	David Kendall	March 30, 1988	186365B	18.1/29
Spring cleaning breathes new life into the family's household objects, and each has a story to tell. Housecleaning turns up things from the family's past and sparks memories.
68	24	"How the West Was Won"	John Tracy	Dan Guntzelman & Steve Marshall	April 20, 1988	186291	15.2/26
69	25	"How the West Was Won"	John Tracy	Dan Guntzelman & Steve Marshall	April 26, 1988	186292	18.8/33
Mike and Boner learn that Coach Lubbock has been fired, prompting them to organize a protest. In part 2, Jason, Carol, Mike, and Boner are arrested over the demonstration of Coach Lubbock's firing.
70	26	"Graduation Day"	John Tracy	Dan Guntzelman & Steve Marshall	May 4, 1988	186116	16.2/28
Mike's graduation stirs memories from his proud parents, who recall his birth and first day of school. (Judith Barsi plays the younger Carol)

=== Season 4 (1988–1989) ===
No. overall	No. in season	Title	Directed by	Written by	Original release date	Prod. code	Viewers (millions)
71	1	"Fool for Love"	John Tracy	Kate Boutilier	October 19, 1988	186433	28.6
Ben works up the courage to ask a girl (Candace Cameron) to a Halloween party.
72	2	"Birth of a Seaver"	John Tracy	David Kendall	October 26, 1988	186434	30.6
Maggie goes into labor on Ben's 12th birthday. Note: This is Chrissy's first appearance on the show as both a newborn and later an infant.
73	3	"Family Ties: Part 1"	John Tracy	Tim O'Donnell	November 2, 1988	186431	29.9
Mike has a showdown with Jason over his rights as an 18-year-old college student and declares his freedom from parental rule.
74	4	"Family Ties: Part 2"	John Tracy	Tom Walla	November 9, 1988	186432	29.6
Mike converts the storage space above the garage into an apartment and must choose whether he wants to be tenant or family member.
75	5	"Guess Who's Coming to Dinner?"	John Tracy	Becky Ayers & Joanna Kerns	November 16, 1988	186435	30.3
Jason learns his widowed mother has a new beau (Robert Rockwell).
76	6	"Homecoming Queen"	John Tracy	Kate Boutilier	November 23, 1988	186436	22.6
Carol is chosen for homecoming court.
77	7	"Nude Photos"	John Tracy	David Kendall	November 30, 1988	186437	29.5
Mike's photography course includes nude studies. While his friends see it as a chance to get their thrills, Mike actually gets a nagging feeling he should be a professional student.
78	8	"Ben's First Kiss"	John Tracy	Tim O'Donnell	December 7, 1988	186439	26.8
Ben throws a party to get to know a girl (Jenny Lewis). Robin Thicke guest stars.
79	9	"The Nanny"	John Tracy	Kevin Abbott	January 4, 1989	186438	31.3
The Seavers hire a nanny for Chrissy, with interesting results.
80	10	"Mandingo"	John Tracy	Story by : Dan Guntzelman & Mike Sullivan; Teleplay by : David Kendall & Tim O'Donnell	January 11, 1989	186442	29.5
A travel snafu strands Julie with Mike.
81	11	"In Carol We Trust"	John Tracy	Tom Walla	January 18, 1989	186441	30.2
With both parents out for a night on the town, Carol has the Seaver residence all to herself. She arranges a romantic evening with Sandy, a guy she's previously broken curfew to meet at a local bar. Then Jason and Maggie return home early; after they discover Sandy, their confrontation with Carol escalates into a shouting match. Note: This is Matthew Perry's first appearance in the series as Sandy. He had co-starred with Tracey Gold and Alan Thicke in Dance 'til Dawn the previous year.
82	12	"Mom of the Year"	John Tracy	Becky Ayers	January 25, 1989	186443	28.1
Maggie is chosen to receive the "Working Mother of the Year" award and prepares a speech.
83	13	"Semper Fidelis"	John Tracy	David Kendall	February 1, 1989	186440	28.3
Boner flunks out of college and joins the Marines.
84	14	"Feet of Clay"	John Tracy	Todd Thicke	February 8, 1989	186444	27.6
Maggie arranges for Ben to meet his favorite rock musician, Jonathan Keith (Brad Pitt)...whose backstage behavior destroys Ben's idolatry of him. It also distorts the boy's view of show business in general. Eric Allan Kramer guest stars. Note: This is Brad Pitt's second appearance in the series. He previously guest-starred as Carol's love-interest Jeff in the season-three episode "Who's Zoomin' Who".
85	15	"Anniversary from Hell"	John Tracy	Tim O'Donnell	February 15, 1989	186446	26.3
The Seavers achieve their 20th anniversary, but trouble in the form of a pie fight erupts among their celebration's guests. Matthew Perry guest stars.
86	16	"Fortunate Son"	John Tracy	Tim O'Donnell	February 22, 1989	186445	25.0
Maggie becomes concerned when Mike takes a job at a convenience store and may have to do dangerous night shifts.
87	17	"Double Standard"	John Tracy	Todd Thicke	March 1, 1989	186447	26.5
Jason punishes Carol and Ben unequally for the same offense: sneaking out for dates.
88	18	"The Recruiter"	John Tracy	Tim O'Donnell	March 15, 1989	186449	27.0
To avoid going to her parents' college without disappointing them, Carol has Mike hire a homeless man (Carmen Filpi) to pose as Jason.
89	19	"Show Ninety – Who Knew?"	John Tracy	Kevin Abbott	March 22, 1989	186450	27.4
Jason helps Mike with his Psychology class, with unexpected results. Note: Contrary to the episode title, this episode was the 89th episode to air, however, it was the 90th episode to be taped.
90	20	"Second Chance"	John Tracy	Story by : Dan Guntzelman & Steve Marshall; Teleplay by : David Kendall	April 12, 1989	186448	24.4
Carol's boyfriend Sandy (Matthew Perry) drives drunk and gets into an accident, resulting in his death. Note: This episode ended with a message that told viewers how many alcohol-related accidents that caused injury or death in the United States occurred while the episode ran. The number increased from 29 to 30 about ten seconds later. However, this message did not generally appear in syndication.
91	21	"The Looooove Boat: Part 1"	John Tracy	David Kendall	April 26, 1989	186451	21.4
Jason's mother wants to get married on a cruise ship.
92	22	"The Looooove Boat: Part 2"	John Tracy	David Kendall	May 3, 1989	186452	20.3
Jason tries to calm his mother when her wedding plans nearly fail.

=== Season 5 (1989–1990) ===
No. overall	No. in season	Title	Directed by	Written by	Original release date	Prod. code	Viewers (millions)
93	1	"Anger With Love"	John Tracy	David Kendall & Tim O'Donnell	September 20, 1989	186704	26.4
Maggie disapproves of Mike and Julie's wedding plans.
94	2	"Mike and Julie's Wedding"	John Tracy	David Kendall	September 27, 1989	186703	27.7
Julie and Mike suffer prenuptial jitters.
95	3	"Carol Meets the Real World"	John Tracy	David Kendall	October 4, 1989	186701	25.8
Jason demands that Carol find a job.
96	4	"Fish Bait"	John Tracy	Rob Bragin	October 11, 1989	186702	26.8
Mike's drama teacher and classmates start to intimidate him.
97	5	"Teach Me"	John Tracy	Tim O'Donnell	October 18, 1989	186706	23.8
Carol brings a fake boyfriend to a family party.
98	6	"Carol's Papers"	John Tracy	Tim O'Donnell	October 25, 1989	186705	24.4
Jason confronts Ben and Mike, who give conflicting versions of how Ben came to sell Carol's old term papers to students at Dewey High – and to date a seductive 18-year-old (Tracy Wells).
99	7	"Coughing Boy"	John Tracy	Mindy Schneider	November 1, 1989	186709	25.6
Mike attends an open casting session and wins a part on a TV cop show.
100	8	"The New Deal: Part 1"	John Tracy	Shelly Landau	November 8, 1989	186707	23.7
Jason gets a promising job offer.
101	9	"The New Deal: Part 2"	John Tracy	Shelly Landau	November 15, 1989	186708	22.7
Jason tries to hide his new job offer from Maggie. Note: Newspaper outlets from the time period announced that this was the 100th episode.
102	10	"Paper Route"	John Tracy	David Kendall	November 22, 1989	186710	19.4
Ben assumes Mike's paper route for half the money.
103	11	"Five Grand"	John Tracy	Tim O'Donnell	November 29, 1989	186713	25.4
Maggie's parents give each of the grandchildren $5,000 as an early inheritance.
104	12	"Carol's Promotion"	John Tracy	Mindy Schneider	December 6, 1989	186711	20.0
Carol considers postponing college when she gets a promotion at work.
105	13	"Ben and Mike's Excellent Adventure"	John Tracy	Rob Bragin	December 13, 1989	186712	22.1
When Mike takes Ben out to get supplies for a last minute project, it turns into all sorts of nighttime adventures to include a run in with the cops and girl-chasing. Jennie Garth guest stars as Denise.
106	14	"The Triangle"	John Tracy	Shelly Landau	January 3, 1990	186714	23.4
Mike falls for his leading lady.
107	15	"The Return of the Triangle"	John Tracy	Shelly Landau	January 10, 1990	186715	26.2
David (David Coburn) turns to Mike for help with Kate.
108	16	"The Home Show"	John Tracy	David Kendall & Tim O'Donnell	January 17, 1990	186716	23.5
The Seavers' reception to raise money for a free mental-health clinic is in trouble when, having mixed-up the date, they send the caterer away, then can't get her back or find another on no notice. They must also get the house ready in 23 minutes.
109	17	"Jason vs. Maggie"	John Tracy	Tim O'Donnell	January 24, 1990	186717	24.7
Jason and Maggie argue over Ben's request to get his ear pierced.
110	18	"Mike, Kate and Julie"	John Tracy	David Kendall	January 31, 1990	186718	23.6
Mike unexpectedly sees a familiar face while on a date with Kate.
111	19	"Mike, the Teacher"	John Tracy	Mindy Schneider	February 7, 1990	186719	22.4
Mike becomes a substitute teacher.
112	20	"Carol in Jail"	John Tracy	Mindy Schneider	February 14, 1990	186720	22.8
Mike's unpaid parking tickets get Carol arrested when she is pulled over driving his car.
113	21	"Future Shock"	John Tracy	Todd Thicke	February 21, 1990	186721	19.3
After seeming to be the oldest parent at Chrissy's preschool, Maggie dreams of Chrissy as a teenager (played by Khrystyne Haje).
114	22	"Ben Cheats"	John Tracy	Tim O'Donnell	March 14, 1990	186722	21.9
Sly classmate Vito introduces Ben to the art of passing exams without actually studying. Ultimately, Ben's view of success in the world becomes distorted when he opts for good honest cramming, only to fail the test anyway. Then his parents ground him for flunking, which adds insult to injury.
115	23	"Mike, the Director"	John Tracy	Rob Bragin	March 21, 1990	186723	21.1
As he prepares to graduate, Mike decides he wants to try his hand at directing.
116	24	"Weekend at Mike's"	John Tracy	Story by : David Kendall & Tim O'Donnell; Teleplay by : Shelly Landau	April 4, 1990	186725	21.2
The family stays at Mike's apartment while the house is being fumigated.
117	25	"Ben's Movie"	John Tracy	Shelly Landau	April 25, 1990	186695	17.7
Ben casts a girl he likes in his home movie.
118	26	"Where There's a Will"	John Tracy	David Kendall	May 2, 1990	186696	17.4
Jason and Mike journey to inspect the mountain cabin Jason has inherited from his Uncle George.

=== Season 6 (1990–1991) ===
No. overall	No. in season	Title	Directed by	Written by	Original release date	Prod. code	Viewers (millions)
119	1	"Mike's Choice"	John Tracy	David Kendall	September 19, 1990	187014	24.4
Mike decides to quit college to fully focus on acting; Jason and Maggie disapprove. First appearance of Ashley Johnson as Chrissy Seaver
120	2	"Midnight Cowboy"	John Tracy	Nick LeRose	September 26, 1990	187015	24.5
Mike moves into the city; Carol has a hard time with her commute to Columbia University.
121	3	"Roommates"	John Tracy	Bob Burris & Michael Ware	October 3, 1990	187016	23.8
Mike and Carol rent an apartment in the city as Jason and Maggie wait patiently for them to return home. The wait may not to be too long as Carol gets immersed in the culture of NYC, indirectly getting her and Mike evicted, and Maggie's parents start laying down the law.
122	4	"Daddy Mike"	John Tracy	Elias Davis & David Pollock	October 10, 1990	187013	25.8
Mike and Eddie (K. C. Martel) join a single-parents group to meet women.
123	5	"Ben's Sure Thing"	John Tracy	Shelly Landau	October 17, 1990	187012	21.7
At Dewey High's Parents' Night, Jason and Maggie discover what Ben has been telling his friends about the girl that he has been dating (Andrea Barber) – and the words' effect on his popularity.
124	6	"Jason Flirts, Maggie Hurts"	John Tracy	Jack Weinberger & Mike Weinberger	October 24, 1990	187011	24.8
A flirty Jason gets jealous when Maggie turns the tables.
125	7	"Happy Halloween"	John Tracy	Jay Abramowitz & Dan Guntzelman & Nick LeRose	October 31, 1990	187017	20.7
126	8	"Happy Halloween"	John Tracy	Jay Abramowitz & Dan Guntzelman & Nick LeRose	October 31, 1990	187018	20.7
The Seavers spend a rainy Halloween night telling ghost stories – and thanks to Mike they discover that truth can be much scarier than fiction. The Seavers' rainy Halloween night continues. Guest starring Jamie Luner – "Cindy Lubbock" of Just the Ten of Us.
127	9	"Let's Go Europe: Part 1"	John Tracy	David Kendall	November 7, 1990	187019	23.0
Jason buys an anniversary trip to Paris from travel-agent Mike, who wins a European tour that falls apart. In Paris, Maggie is bitten not by the love bug but by appendicitis.
128	10	"Let's Go Europe: Part 2"	John Tracy	Bob Burris & Michael Ware	November 14, 1990	187020	23.4
While Maggie is hospitalized in Paris, Mike is stuck on the road with an angry customer.
129	11	"Let's Go Europe: Part 3"	John Tracy	Story by : Dan Guntzelman & David Kendall; Teleplay by : Bob Burris & Michael Ware	November 28, 1990	187022	23.8
Mike and Amy continue to bicker their way toward Paris.
130	12	"Divorce Story"	John Tracy	Elias Davis & David Pollock	December 5, 1990	187023	18.2
Jason, happy to see his mother's second marriage crumbling, doesn't want to offer professional help.
131	13	"The World According to Chrissy"	John Tracy	Leilani Downer	December 19, 1990	187024	16.5
Chrissy's imaginary friend is a 6-foot-tall mouse named Ike.
132	14	"How Could I Leave Her Behind?"	John Tracy	Jack Weinberger & Mike Weinberger	January 2, 1991	187021	22.2
Mike and Eddie double-date – Eddie's date is Mike's ex-girlfriend.
133	15	"Like Father, Like Son"	John Tracy	Vince Cheung & Ben Montanio	January 9, 1991	187025	22.9
In an intrafamily communications seminar, Mike and Jason discover how alike they are.
134	16	"Ben's Rap Group"	John Tracy	Todd Thicke	January 23, 1991	187027	22.6
Jason becomes Ben's business partner in rap-group management, but he uses the money he's invested to control Ben.
135	17	"Eddie, We Hardly Knew Ye"	John Tracy	Rich Reinhart	January 30, 1991	187026	21.3
Maggie's father Ed dies while visiting the Seavers.
136	18	"Maggie Seaver's: The Meaning of Life"	John Tracy	Jay Abramowitz	February 6, 1991	187029	22.1
Jason takes Maggie on a Hawaiian getaway to lift her spirits after her father's death.
137	19	"All the World is a Stage"	John Tracy	David Kendall	February 13, 1991	187030	22.6
Mike competes with a well-established actor for a soap-opera role.
138	20	"Not With My Carol You Don't"	John Tracy	Leilani Downer	February 20, 1991	187028	16.2
Jason encourages Carol to volunteer at a clinic, then disapproves of the ex-con she meets there.
139	21	"Meet the Seavers"	John Tracy	Story by : Dan Guntzelman & David Kendall & Nick LeRose & Steve Marshall & Mike Sullivan; Teleplay by : Bob Burris & Michael Ware	March 6, 1991	187032	20.4
In a Twilight Zone-esque episode, Ben gets shouted at by his parents and grouses to himself how come his family is not like what he sees on TV. He awakens to discover he's Jeremy Miller, an actor on the set of the TV show "Meet the Seavers".
140	22	"Carol's Carnival"	John Tracy	Rich Reinhart	March 27, 1991	187033	20.5
Ben forces Carol to go on a date with the brother of his new girlfriend but he ditches her and Carol meets another man at the carnival, their date site.
141	23	"Home Schooling"	John Tracy	Story by : Dan Guntzelman & Mike Sullivan; Teleplay by : Nick LeRose	April 17, 1991	187031	18.7
Maggie homeschools Ben after he is suspended from school.
142	24	"Viva Las Vegas"	John Tracy	Shelly Landau	April 24, 1991	187034	19.0
Mike and Kate accompany the eloping Eddie and a hat-check bimbette to Las Vegas.

=== Season 7 (1991–1992) ===
No. overall	No. in season	Title	Directed by	Written by	Original release date	Prod. code	Viewers (millions)
143	1	"Back to School"	Jack Shea	Bob Burris & Michael Ware	September 18, 1991	187201	19.9
Mike begins his first day teaching remedial students.
144	2	"Stop, Luke, and Listen: Part 1"	Jack Shea	Liz Sage	September 25, 1991	187203	21.1
Mike learns his best student, Luke Brower (Leonardo DiCaprio), is homeless, and offers to help him.
145	3	"In Wine There Is Truth: Part 2"	Jack Shea	Rich Reinhart	September 28, 1991	187204	16.4
Mike persuades Jason and Maggie to let Luke stay with them temporarily; just as he moves in, Jason's wine collection disappears.
146	4	"Paper Tigers"	Jack Shea	Leilani Downer	October 5, 1991	187202	13.8
Jason and Maggie compete to write a newspaper column; Ben starts to hate his glasses.
147	5	"The Young and the Homeless"	Jack Shea	Bob Burris & Michael Ware	October 12, 1991	187205	13.0
Luke runs away from the Seavers' just as Mike is about to film his soap-opera scenes.
148	6	"Jason Sings the Blues"	Jack Shea	Jerry Colker	October 19, 1991	187206	12.4
Jason accompanies a leery Luke to the doctor, where he gets nasty news.
149	7	"The Kid's Still Got It"	Iris Dugow	Jerry Colker	October 26, 1991	187207	11.2
Carol accompanies Maggie to a resort on an interesting weekend; at home, the all-male weekend is infiltrated by a female: Chrissy, who has been sent home with head lice.
150	8	"There Must Be a Pony"	Iris Dugow	Liz Sage	November 2, 1991	187208	12.9
Nouveau-riche neighbors move in next door and their lavish party crashes Jason's "cure" for Chrissy wanting to stay up late because she thinks her bedtime has been keeping her from big fun. Meanwhile, Ben must be Luke's "Big Brother" on his first day of high school, but he soon realizes that Luke will do fine. Note: Hilary Swank appears as Sasha Serotsky, a classmate of Ben and Luke.
151	9	"The Big Fix"	Iris Dugow	Leilani Downer	November 9, 1991	187209	12.5
Consumer advocate Maggie raps a vacuum cleaner that Ben secretly broke.
152	10	"Home Malone"	Burt Brinckerhoff	Rich Reinhart	November 16, 1991	187210	12.4
The ghost of Maggie's father Ed oversees the Seavers' visit to her childhood home.
153	11	"Bad Day Cafe"	Renny Temple	Bud Wiser	November 23, 1991	187212	14.6
Luke's father comes to town wanting him back.
154	12	"B=MC2"	Gerren Keith	Cathy Jung	November 30, 1991	187211	11.7
Ben crams for a college entrance exam with no help from Jason.
155	13	"It's Not Easy Being Green"	Renny Temple	Leilani Downer	December 21, 1991	187213	11.7
Christmastime brings the Seavers anger and angst.
156	14	"The Call of the Wild"	Andy Cadiff	Bob Burris & Michael Ware	January 4, 1992	187214	12.4
Penniless Mike schemes to give Kate a ski-trip. Note: This is Tracey Gold's last episode before commencing real-life treatment for anorexia. She will appear sporadically until the series finale.
157	15	"Honest Abe"	Burt Brinckerhoff	Wendy Braff	January 18, 1992	187216	11.6
Luke's homeless friend steals a Seaver memento. Note: Tracey Gold does not appear in this episode.
158	16	"Vicious Cycle"	Burt Brinckerhoff	Cathy Jung	February 1, 1992	187217	12.5
Maggie and Jason hold Mike accountable for Luke's curfew problems. Note: Tracey Gold does not appear in this episode.
159	17	"Menage a Luke"	Gerren Keith	Todd Thicke	February 8, 1992	187215	11.5
A love triangle involves Ben, Luke, and a classmate (Wendy Cox). Note: Hilary Swank appears as Sasha Serotsky, a classmate of Ben and Luke.
160	18	"The Five Fingers of Ben"	Burt Brinckerhoff	Jerry Colker	February 22, 1992	187218	13.6
Tired of being at the mercy of Dewey High bully Razor (David Kriegel), Ben takes karate lessons, where his self-confidence goes up in smoke after Maggie gives him a black eye in an impromptu sparring session. Note: Tracey Gold does not appear in this episode.
161	19	"Don't Go Changin'"	Don Amendolia	Leilani Downer & Rich Reinhart	February 29, 1992	187220	10.5
Mike believes his old friend Eddie is a bad influence on Luke. Note: Tracey Gold does not appear in this episode.
162	20	"The Truck Stops Here"	Joanna Kerns	Jerry Colker	March 21, 1992	187219	12.3
Luke's father returns, wanting him to join him on his trucking journeys. Note: Tracey Gold does not appear in this episode. Note: This episode marks the final appearance for Leonardo DiCaprio as Luke Brower.
163	21	"Maggie's Brilliant Career"	Gerren Keith	Kate Boutilier	April 4, 1992	187221	13.4
Maggie wants to fulfill a dream by climbing a mountain. Note: Tracey Gold does not appear in this episode.
164	22	"The Wrath of Con Ed"	Nancy Heydorn	Liz Sage	April 11, 1992	187222	11.5
A power failure hampers Jason and Maggie's romantic evening.
165	23	"The Last Picture Show: Parts 1 & 2"	Jonathan Weiss	Bob Burris, Wendy Braff, Jerry Colker, Leilani Downer, Cathy Jung, Rich Reinhart, Liz Sage, Michael Ware & Dan Wilcox	April 25, 1992	187223	21.1
166	24	"The Last Picture Show: Parts 1 & 2"	Jonathan Weiss	Bob Burris & Michael Ware	April 25, 1992	187224	21.1
A senator offers Maggie a job in Washington, D.C. Should she accept? Mike proposes to Kate and the family reminisces about good times in their home.

== TV films ==
Title	Directed by	Written by	Original release date	Viewers (millions)
The Growing Pains Movie	Alan Metter	David Kendall & Mike Sullivan	November 5, 2000	15.05
The Seavers help Maggie in her senate campaign against her former boss.
Growing Pains: Return of the Seavers	Joanna Kerns	Christina Lynch & Loren Segan	October 16, 2004	6.89
Jason and Maggie want to sell the house and retire causing a rift with real estate agent Ben, Mike and Carol.
