= Growing Pains: Return of the Seavers =

2004 television film by Joanna Kerns

- DVD cover
- Genre: Comedy
- Based on: Growing Pains by Neal Marlens
- Written by: Christina Lynch; Loren Segan
- Directed by: Joanna Kerns
- Starring: Alan Thicke; Joanna Kerns; Kirk Cameron; Tracey Gold; Jeremy Miller; Ashley Johnson; Chelsea Noble; Evan Arnold; Brittany Robertson; Robert Treveiler; J. Patrick McNamara; Natalija Nogulich
- Composer: Kenneth Burgomaster
- Country of origin: United States
- Original language: English

Production
- Executive producers: Jim Green; Mark Bacino
- Producer: Albert J. Salzer
- Cinematography: John C. Flinn III
- Editor: Micky Blythe
- Running time: 89 minutes
- Production companies: Crescent City Pictures City Pictures, Inc.; Green Epstein Bacino Productions; Warner Bros. Television

Original release
- Network: ABC
- Release: October 16, 2004

Related
- The Growing Pains Movie

Growing Pains: Return of the Seavers (also known as Growing Pains II: Home Equity) is a 2004 American made-for-television comedy film and is the second (and to date, last) reunion film of the modern-day Seaver family from the 1985–1992 sitcom Growing Pains. It was filmed in New Orleans, Louisiana, and originally aired on ABC on October 16, 2004.

== Plot ==
The Seaver children have left the nest and have children of their own. Mike, Carol, and Chrissy have no place to go when Kate is at a spa, Scott is out on a campaign, and Chrissy claims to have been evicted. Jason and Maggie plan to sell their house to a childhood friend of Mike and Carol's named Richie Flanscopper. Acting as the realtor, Ben is dead set on selling the house, but the rest of the Seaver kids object. Mike and Carol (who is pregnant) take matters into their own hands and sabotage the house so their little brother can't sell it to Richie and his wife Fiona. Meanwhile, Mike's oldest child, Michelle, is sad about her dad going to Tokyo for a job promotion. In the end, Ben realizes that his siblings and parents don't want to sell the house, so he makes the house unsellable by driving Mike's car through the garage door. The Seavers rejoice, until Carol goes into labor. Carol gives birth to a son, named Seaver Malone Johnson Coffer.

== Cast ==
=== Main ===
- Alan Thicke as Jason Seaver
- Joanna Kerns as Maggie Seaver
- Kirk Cameron as Mike Seaver
- Tracey Gold as Carol Seaver-Coffer
- Jeremy Miller as Ben Seaver
- Ashley Johnson as Chrissy Seaver
- Chelsea Noble as Kate MacDonald-Seaver

=== Co-Starring ===
- Evan Arnold as Richie Flanscopper
- Kelly Collins Lintz as Fiona
- Brittany Robertson as Michelle Seaver
- Natalija Nogulich as Mike's boss
- Johnny Alonso as Mickey
- Mi'cah Ducros as Sara
- Kelly Ford as Anna
- Justin Dubose as Ritchie

=== Featuring ===
- John McConnell as Frontman
- Michael Arata as Exterminator
- Billy Slaughter as Grocery Clerk
- Mike Mito as Sushi Chef
- P.J. Davis
- Douglas Griffin as Young Sale Buyer
- Bernard Hocke as Bargain Hunter #2
- Jerry Lee Laughton as RV Salesman
- Peter Gable

== Home media ==
A manufacture-on-demand DVD was released through Warner Archive Collection on December 6, 2011, along with the preceding film The Growing Pains Movie.
