= Growing Pains =

American television sitcom (1985–1992)

- Official series logo, as seen in title sequence
- Genre: Sitcom
- Created by: Neal Marlens
- Directed by: John Tracy (seasons 1–6); Various (seasons 1–2 and 7)
- Starring: Alan Thicke; Joanna Kerns; Kirk Cameron; Tracey Gold; Jeremy Miller; Ashley Johnson; Leonardo DiCaprio
- Theme music composer: John Bettis; Steve Dorff
- Opening theme: "As Long as We Got Each Other" performed by B. J. Thomas (season 1 solo) and with Jennifer Warnes (seasons 2, 3, 5, and most of 7) and Dusty Springfield (season 4); Joe Chemay, Jim Haas, Jon Joyce, and George Merrill (seasons 6, part of 7, and the series finale)
- Ending theme: "As Long as We Got Each Other" (instrumental) (except on "Happy Halloween")
- Composer: Steve Dorff
- Country of origin: United States
- Original language: English
- No. of seasons: 7
- No. of episodes: 166 (list of episodes)

Production
- Executive producers: Neal Marlens (1985–1986); Mike Sullivan (1985–1991); Dan Guntzelman (1986–1991); Steve Marshall (1986–1991); Dan Wilcox (1991–1992); Alan Thicke (1991–1992)
- Producers: Arnold Margolin (season 1); Henry Johnson (seasons 4–5); Joseph Scott (season 6–7)
- Camera setup: Multi-camera
- Running time: 21–24 minutes
- Production companies: Guntzelman-Sullivan-Marshall Productions (seasons 5–6); Warner Bros. Television

Original release
- Network: ABC
- Release: September 24, 1985 – April 25, 1992

Related
- The Growing Pains Movie; Growing Pains: Return of the Seavers; Just the Ten of Us

Growing Pains is an American television sitcom created by Neal Marlens that ran on ABC for seven seasons from September 24, 1985, to April 25, 1992. The series follows the misadventures of the Seaver family, including psychiatrist and father Jason, journalist and mother Maggie, and their children Mike, Carol, Ben, and Chrissy. 166 episodes were produced.

== Premise ==
The show centers on the Seaver family of Huntington, a town on Long Island, New York. Dr. Jason Seaver (Alan Thicke), a psychiatrist, works from home because his wife, Maggie (Joanna Kerns), has gone back to work as a reporter.

Jason has to take care of the children: ladies' man and rebellious troublemaker Mike (Kirk Cameron); bookish honors student Carol (Tracey Gold); and rambunctious Ben (Jeremy Miller), who follows Mike as his role model and becomes a troublemaker too. A fourth child, Chrissy Seaver (twins Kelsey and Kirsten Dohring; Ashley Johnson), was added in Season 4. In Season 7, Luke Brower (Leonardo DiCaprio), a homeless teen, was adopted into the Seaver family.

== Cast and characters ==
=== Main ===
- Alan Thicke as Dr. Jason Roland Seaver. Dr. Seaver is a graduate of Boston College and holds a doctorate in psychology. He initially practiced at Long Island General Hospital before working from home and volunteering at his local community's free clinic.
- Joanna Kerns as Margaret Katherine "Maggie" (née Malone) Seaver. Maggie is also a graduate of Boston College where she met her future husband and majored in child psychology before switching to journalism. Prior to her marriage, she worked as a researcher for Newsweek magazine. Due to her pre-marriage popularity in journalism, she continues to utilize her maiden name in professional settings. She is a reporter for the Long Island Daily Herald and for the television news program Action News on Channel 19. She is also a columnist for the Long Island Sentinel.
- Kirk Cameron as Michael Aaron "Mike" Seaver. Mike, the oldest child, attended Wendell Willkie Elementary School before moving to Dewey High School. He accumulates multiple menial jobs: waiter at The World of Burgers, salesman at The Stereo Village, car wash attendant, night man at the Stop and Shop convenience store, singing waiter at Sullivan's Tavern. Of average ability, he aspires nonetheless to become an actor. He enrolls at Alf Landon Junior College and, later, at Boyton State College. At Alf Landon, Mike was a member of the Drama Club where he meets his girlfriend Kate McDonald in the play "The Passion". He eventually becomes a teacher of remedial studies at a community health center.
- Tracey Gold as Caroline Anne "Carol" Seaver. Carol is the second born child. She attended Dewey High School where she was a candidate for the 1988 homecoming queen and President of the Future Nuclear Physicists Club. She later attends Columbia University (to the disappointment of her parents who would have preferred her to enroll at their alma mater) but drops out to work as a computer page breaker at GSM Publishing. She returns to Columbia to study law and works with her father at the free clinic.
- Jeremy Miller as Benjamin Hubert Horatio Humphrey "Ben" Seaver. Ben attends the same elementary and high school as his siblings. Heavily influenced by his older brother, Ben holds a number of menial jobs including newspaper delivery boy and attempts to make money by managing a rap group.

=== Later additions ===
- A fourth child, Christine Ellen "Chrissy" Seaver (twins Kelsey and Kirsten Dohring; Ashley Johnson), is born at the beginning of season 4, a day after Ben's 12th birthday. She was played in her newborn/infant stage by two uncredited sets of twin sisters, who remained in the role until season 4 (1988–1989) ended. By season 5 (1989–1990), she was played in her toddler stage by alternating twins Kirsten and Kelsey Dohring. In seasons 6 and 7 (1990–1992), Chrissy's age was advanced to 5 years old and she was played by Ashley Johnson.
- A new cast member was added for the seventh and final season (1991–1992) when homeless teen Luke Brower (Leonardo DiCaprio) is brought into the Seaver family to live with them until the end of season 7.

=== Recurring ===
- Andrew Koenig as Richard Milhous "Boner" Stabone (seasons 1–4), Mike's friend; left to join the United States Marine Corps.
- Chelsea Noble as Kate MacDonald (seasons 5–7), Mike's girlfriend. They both meet at Alf Landon Junior College. She later becomes a model and appears in the 1992 swimsuit edition of The Sporting Man magazine.
- Jamie Abbott as Stinky Sullivan (seasons 2–6), Ben's friend.
- K. C. Martel as Eddie Ziff (seasons 1–7), Mike's friend.
- Sam Anderson as Principal Willis DeWitt (seasons 1–7), Mike's history teacher in season one and principal from season 2 onward.
- Lisa Capps as Debbie (seasons 2–4), Carol's friend.
- Rachel Jacobs as Shelley (seasons 2–4), Carol's friend.
- Betty McGuire as Kate Malone (seasons 1–2 and 4-7); Maggie's mother.
- Gordon Jump as Ed Malone (seasons 1–2 and 4-7), Maggie's father.
- Julie McCullough as Julie Costello (seasons 4–5), Mike's former girlfriend who was originally hired by Jason to be Chrissy's nanny. Julie is a sophomore at Columbia University majoring in child psychology. When she and Mike break up, she quits school and becomes a waitress at Le Village Restaurant.
- Bill Kirchenbauer as Coach Graham Lubbock (seasons 2–3; starred in spin off Just the Ten of Us), a gym teacher.
- Jane Powell as Irma Seaver (seasons 4–6), Jason's mother.
- Jodi Peterson as Laura Lynn (seasons 4–6), Ben's girlfriend/love interest.
- Kevin Wixted as Bobby Wynette (seasons 2–3), Carol's boyfriend.
- Christopher Burgard as Dwight Halliburton (season 7), Carol's love interest.
- Evan Arnold as Richie Flanscopper (seasons 1–3), Carol's school classmate who has a crush on her.
- Fred Applegate as Mr. Fred Tedesco (season 7), the principal of the learning annex where Mike teaches.
- Matthew Perry as Sandy (season 4), Carol's love interest of 3 episodes. He died several hours after a DUI accident following "a few beers".

== Episodes ==
Season	Episodes	Originally released		Rank	Rating
Season	Episodes	First released	Last released	Rank	Rating
1	22	September 24, 1985	May 13, 1986	17	19.5 (Note: Tied with Knots Landing)
2	22	September 30, 1986	May 19, 1987	8	22.7
3	26	September 18, 1987	May 4, 1988	5	21.3
4	22	October 18, 1988	May 3, 1989	13	17.6 (Note: Tied with L.A. Law)
5	26	September 20, 1989	May 2, 1990	21	15.4
6	24	September 19, 1990	April 24, 1991	27	14.3 (Note: Tied with Baby Talk and Davis Rules)
7	24	September 18, 1991	April 25, 1992	75	8.6

== Production ==
=== Casting ===
Soon after the cancelation of The Four Seasons, Joanna Kerns auditioned for a new series in late 1984, called Growing Pains, which was being developed by screenwriter Neal Marlens, alongside executive producer Mike Sullivan. She auditioned with Alan Thicke, who was coming off the failure of his syndicated late-night talk show Thicke of the Night. Kerns joked in many interviews that she and Alan had immediate chemistry, especially when she kissed him on his nose by accident during their audition together. Kerns and Thicke's chemistry won them both the parts of lead characters Maggie and Jason Seaver, and the two became great friends off the show. Both of them had many things in common, including being newly divorced single parents.

Tracey Gold auditioned for the role of Carol Seaver, but was passed over in favor of Elizabeth Ward, who had starred alongside Gold in the 1983 ABC Afterschool Special The Hand-Me-Down Kid. Test audiences did not find Ward to be suited for the role of Carol, and Gold promptly replaced her; scenes featuring Ward in the original pilot were subsequently reshot with Gold for the broadcast version.

Marlens and most of the original writing and producing staff—including Marlens' wife, Carol Black, who had quickly ascended from story editor to co-executive producer during the first half of the season—were let go from the series midway through its first season. Replacing Marlens and joining Sullivan as showrunners were Steve Marshall and Dan Guntzelman, who met and formed their writing partnership while working on WKRP in Cincinnati.

In 1991, Leonardo DiCaprio joined the main cast in the role of Luke Brower, a homeless teenager who is taken in by the Seaver family at the behest of Mike, who, by then, was a substitute teacher at the high school where Luke had masqueraded as a student. Co-star Joanna Kerns recalled DiCaprio being "especially intelligent and disarming for his age," but also mischievous on set.

Then-15-year-old DiCaprio was cast in a bid to appeal to teenage female viewers, similar to how Cameron gained heartthrob status with that demographic during the show's earlier seasons, but was written out towards the end of Season 7, in order to allow DiCaprio to begin work on the 1993 biographical drama film This Boy's Life. Still, the addition of DiCaprio—who earned a Young Artist Award nomination for Best Young Actor Co-starring in a Television Series for his work as Luke—did not improve the show's ratings.

=== Opening and closing credits ===
The opening theme song, "As Long As We've Got Each Other", was written by John Bettis, composed by Steve Dorff, and produced by Dorff and Gary Klein. The song was performed solo by B. J. Thomas for the first season, accompanied by Jennifer Warnes for much of the remainder of the series' run (with an updated synth version of this duet used for Season 5 and the majority of Season 7). For Season 4, a rock orchestration of the duet was used, with Dusty Springfield accompanying Thomas. An a cappella version of the tune (performed by an uncredited quartet consisting of Joe Chemay, Jim Haas, Jon Joyce and George Merrill) was used in Season 6 and for four episodes during Season 7, including the series finale. The end theme was an instrumental version of the song, accompanied by a saxophone lead (an orchestration styled after the Thomas–Springfield variation of the main theme was used for Seasons 4 through 6, reverting to the original closing variant for the final season).

The show's original opening credits sequence (designed by Castle Bryant Johnsen) featured vintage photos and paintings showcasing families throughout history, followed by a photo of the main cast in the Seaver family kitchen that transitioned from sepia-toned to color at the end. Season 2 introduced the familiar sequence that bookended footage of the cast standing in front of the Victorian-style house at the Warner Bros. Studios Burbank backlot that was used for establishing exterior shots of the Seaver residence, with photos of each cast member during their formative years (and for Thicke and Kerns, into earlier adulthood) and a selection of clips from various episodes.

The opening credits, especially from Seasons 2 through 5, differed from traditional sitcoms by incorporating sight gags (similar to The Dick Van Dyke Show's ottoman gag and The Simpsons couch gags), involving specifically shot scenes with the cast on-location, albeit with far more variation. The close of the sequence during those seasons saw most of the Seavers leaving their standing position to go into the house; Seasons 2 and 3 used a single clip in which Jason stayed a few seconds behind the other Seavers, before following the rest of the family, while Seasons 4 and 5 featured several variations showing a different family member lagging behind the others.

The two-part third season premiere "Aloha" featured the Seavers standing in front of the Maui Prince Hotel, with clips from the episode interspersed with the vintage cast photos. (Part 2 used an instrumental version of "Swept Away", a song specifically written for the episode by Dorff, Bettis and Christopher Cross, who also performed the full version in the episode, as the closing theme.) With the conclusion of the character's pregnancy storyline, the first two episodes of Season 4 depicted a pregnant Maggie Seaver, with the rest of the cast standing in front of the house set: "Fool for Love" featured Mike and Carol holding up "We're back... finally" signs in a fourth wall reference to the season being delayed by the 1988 Writers Guild strike), while "Birth of a Seaver" has the theme music abruptly stop as Maggie discovers that she is in labor, with the family ushering her back to the house as the song finishes. The youngest member, infant Chrissy, is featured thereafter, with Carol holding an "It's a Girl" sign in the gag for "Family Ties (Part 1)".

The title sequence for the final two seasons featured the Seavers doing a family photoshoot (all dressed in formal wear), opening and closing with shots of current and past family photos above the Seavers' fireplace mantle. Although the "formative years" photo montages were kept, clips from previous episodes were replaced with still photos of each cast member. (Photos of Leonardo DiCaprio taken for the sequence replaced the ending segment showing outtakes of the Seaver family photoshoot starting with Season 7's "Jason Sings the Blues".) However, Season 6 would feature two episodes incorporating special title sequences: the two-part anthology episode "Happy Halloween" (mainly featuring clips from the episode's Halloween story vignettes) and "All the World's a Stage" (set during Mike and Kate's performance at a dinner theater, with disclaimer credits of the cast members and executive producers appearing over shots of the theater patrons).

== Cast issues ==
=== Cameron's religion ===
Kirk Cameron, who was an atheist in his early teens, became a born-again Protestant Christian when he was 17, during the height of his career on the show. After converting to Christianity, he began to insist that the show's plotlines be altered to remove anything he thought was too inappropriate, objecting to even mild innuendo in show scripts. One such example involved a segment from the teaser scene of the Season 6 episode "Midnight Cowboy," which cut to his character, Mike, and a girl talking in bed, only to reveal they were rehearsing a scene for a stage play. Cameron, however, did the scene as written.

Julie McCullough was cast as Julie Costello, a recurring character hired by Jason to work as a nanny for newborn Chrissy Seaver, during the fourth season in 1989, appearing in eight episodes until she was fired at the start of the fifth season. The show's producers have claimed that her character was never intended to be permanent—citing the idea of Mike being in a committed relationship went against his characterization as an "immature imp [...] ill-equipped to deal with a grownup world on all levels"—and Cameron stated in his 2008 memoir Still Growing that he did not call for her firing. It is alleged McCullough's termination from the show was a result of Cameron's objections to her having posed nude in Playboy, prompting Cameron to claim to the producers, and allegedly, in a phone call with then-ABC Entertainment President Bob Iger, that they were promoting pornography by hiring McCullough. Cameron reportedly did not reconcile with McCullough, who claims that Cameron refused to speak to her during a later encounter. She remains critical of him, stating that the public criticism she endured during the controversy damaged her career. (Note: McCullough would reprise her role in Season 5's "Mike, Kate and Julie" to provide closure for Mike and Julie, whose relationship ended earlier that season via a Dear John letter written by the latter in "Mike and Julie's Wedding".)

Cameron's conversion, specifically his behavior after becoming a Protestant, is said to have alienated him from his fellow cast members, as he did not invite any of them to his 1991 wedding to Chelsea Noble, who recurred as Mike's on-off love interest-turned-girlfriend, Kate McDonnell, during the show's last three seasons. The creative clashes between Cameron and executive producers Marshall, Guntzelman and Sullivan are said to have prompted the three showrunners, along with co-executive producer/writer David Kendall and director John Tracy, to quit the series following the sixth season. Dan Wilcox replaced Marshall, Sullivan and Guntzelman for what would be the show's final season.

Cameron did not maintain contact with his former co-stars and did not speak to Gold for eight years after the series ended. Cameron has stated that this was not due to any animosity on his part toward any of his former cast members, but an outgrowth of his desire to start a new life away from the entertainment industry. In 2000, Cameron revealed he apologized to his television family for some of his prior behavior, saying, "If I could go back, I think I could make decisions that were less inadvertently hurtful to the cast--like talking and explaining to them why I just wanted to have my family at my wedding."

=== Gold's health issues ===
In 1988, at age 19, Gold gained some weight over the production hiatus between the show's third and fourth seasons. For Season 4, scripts called for Carol to be the brunt of fat jokes from her brothers, Mike and Ben, for many episodes in a row. By October 1988, Gold lost 23 lbs, dropping from a weight of 133 lbs to about 110 lbs, after going on a medically supervised 500-calorie-a-day (2,100 kJ) diet, though scripts continued to include occasional fat jokes made at Carol's expense. In her 2003 memoir Room to Grow: An Appetite for Life, Gold revealed that she became increasingly obsessed with food and her physical appearance between 1989 and 1991, and continued to slowly and steadily lose weight.

In 1990, Gold began group therapy in an eating disorder program but only learned more ways to lose weight. Gold's body image issues were touched upon slightly in the Season 6 episode "Carol's Carnival", which features a scene in which Carol looks at herself in a carnival mirror and describes to another character the distorted image in her head. By 1991, her disorder had devolved into bulimia nervosa, having lost a massive amount of weight through both self-starvation and vomiting, causing her to be admitted to a hospital for treatment in early 1992.

Gold—who was estimated to have been near 80 lbs. at her lowest weight—was suspended from the show following production of the Season 7 episode "Menage a Luke", due to her skeletal appearance that was fairly obvious in some scenes. (Note: "Honest Abe" and "Vicious Cycle"—which preceded "Menage a Luke" in broadcast order—were both taped after Gold went into treatment.) Gold's absence is addressed several episodes later in "Don't Go Changin'", which features a subplot in which Ben films a video letter for Carol, who in-canon is studying abroad in London. (Note: The "We miss you" message to Carol seen during Ben's finished video at the end of the episode later swaps the character's name with Gold's.)

Photos of Gold's emaciated body were plastered all over tabloid magazines, and she was one of the first celebrities ever to be formally outed for anorexia. She returned for the show's final episodes ("The Wrath of Con-Ed", and the two-part finale "The Last Picture Show") in the late spring of 1992. Gold eventually recovered from her years-long struggle and starred in the 1994 made-for-TV movie For the Love of Nancy, drawing on her own experiences with anorexia nervosa to portray the title character.

=== Stalking ===
At about age 14, starting during the show's sixth season, Jeremy Miller received numerous letters from an older male stalker, who was later arrested and convicted on stalking charges.

=== Finale ===
At the start of the 1991–92 season, ABC moved Growing Pains from its longtime Wednesday slot to Saturday nights, joined by fellow ABC comedy veterans Who's the Boss? and, by midseason, Perfect Strangers, all of which became the centerpieces of the short-lived TGIF spinoff block I Love Saturday Night, which saw the show—which had seen a steady erosion in viewers over the past few seasons, while still remaining in the Nielsen Top 30 through Season 6—experience a dramatic decline in viewership from Nr. 27 to Nr. 75, resulting in ABC and the show's producers agreeing to end the series at the conclusion of its seventh season.

The hour-long series finale ("The Last Picture Show", which incorporated clips from the show's seven-year run) aired on April 25, 1992, a night that also saw fellow veteran ABC series Who's the Boss? (also as a special one-hour episode) and MacGyver end their runs.

== Spin-off and connections ==
=== Just the Ten of Us ===
Growing Pains spawned the spin-off series Just the Ten of Us, which featured Coach Graham Lubbock, Mike and Carol's gym teacher, moving to California with his large family to teach at an all-boys Catholic school after he was fired from Thomas Dewey High School.

=== Hangin' with Mr. Cooper ===
Alan Thicke later made a cameo appearance as himself in the pilot episode of fellow ABC sitcom Hangin' with Mr. Cooper in September 1992. The pre-credits teaser scene in which Thicke appeared alongside series star Mark Curry humorously referenced the pilot episode being filmed on the same set that had been used as the Seavers' home on Growing Pains.

== Reunion movies ==
In 2000, the cast reunited for The Growing Pains Movie, followed by Growing Pains: Return of the Seavers in 2004. Before the premiere of The Growing Pains Movie, Kirk Cameron described his regrets over how his relationship with his castmates changed after his religious conversion during the production of the series, admitting, "I definitely kind of made an about-face, going toward another aspect of my life," and "I shifted my focus from 100% on the show, to 100% on [my new life], and left 0% on the show—and even the friendships that were a part of that show."

== Awards and nominations ==
Awards and nominations for Growing Pains
Year	Association	Category	Nominee/episode	Result
1985	Young Artist Award	Best Young Actor Starring in a New Television Series	Kirk Cameron	Won
1985	Young Artist Award	Best Young Actress Starring in a New Television Series	Tracey Gold	Nominated
1985	Young Artist Award	Best Young Supporting Actor in a New Television Series	Jeremy Miller	Won
1986	Primetime Emmy Awards	Outstanding Achievement in Music and Lyrics	"As Long As We Got Each Other"	Nominated
1986	Primetime Emmy Awards	Outstanding Lighting Direction (Electronic) for a Series	George Spiro Dibie (director of photography) / "My Brother, Myself"	Won
1986	Young Artist Awards	Exceptional Performance by a Young Actor Starring in a Television Comedy or Drama Series	Kirk Cameron	Won
1986	Young Artist Awards	Exceptional Performance by a Young Actor in a Long-Running Series Comedy or Drama	Jeremy Miller	Nominated
1986	Young Artist Awards	Exceptional Performance by a Young Actress, Guest Starring in a Television, Comedy or Drama Series	April Lerman	Nominated
1987	Young Artist Awards	Best Young Superstar in Television	Kirk Cameron	Won
1987	Young Artist Awards	Exceptional Performance by a Young Actor in a Television Comedy Series	Jeremy Miller	
1987	Young Artist Awards	Best Young Actress Guest Starring in a Television Comedy Series	Candace Cameron / "The Long Goodbye"	Nominated
1987	Young Artist Awards	Best Family Comedy Series	Growing Pains	Won
1988	Primetime Emmy Awards	Outstanding Achievement in Music and Lyrics	Song: "Swept Away" / episode: "Aloha"	Nominated
1988	Kids' Choice Awards	Favorite TV Actor	Kirk Cameron	Nominated
1988	Kids' Choice Awards	Favorite TV Show	Growing Pains	Nominated
1988	Golden Globe Awards	Best Performance by an Actor in a TV-Series – Comedy/Musical	Alan Thicke	Nominated
1988	Golden Globe Awards	Best Performance by an Actor in a Supporting Role in a Series, Miniseries or Motion Picture Made for TV	Kirk Cameron	Nominated
1989	Golden Globe Awards	Best Performance by an Actor in a Supporting Role in a Series, Miniseries or Motion Picture Made for TV	Kirk Cameron	Nominated
1989	Kids' Choice Awards	Favorite TV Show	Growing Pains	Nominated
1989	Kids' Choice Awards	Favorite TV Actor	Kirk Cameron	Nominated
1989	Kids' Choice Awards	Favorite TV Actress	Tracey Gold	Nominated
1989	Young Artist Awards	Best Family Television Series	Growing Pains	Nominated
1990	Young Artist Awards	Best Young Actor Starring in a Television Series	Jeremy Miller	Nominated
1990	Young Artist Awards	Best Young Actor Guest Starring in a Television Series	Kenny Morrison	Nominated
1990	Kids' Choice Awards	Favorite TV Actor	Kirk Cameron	Won
1991	Primetime Emmy Awards	Outstanding Lighting Direction (Electronic) for a Comedy Series	George Spiro Dibie / "Happy Halloween"	Won
1991	Young Artist Awards	Exceptional Performance by a Young Actress Under Nine	Ashley Johnson	Nominated
1992	Young Artist Awards	Best Young Actor Co-starring in a Television Series	Leonardo DiCaprio	Nominated
1992	Young Artist Awards	Exceptional Performance by a Young Actress Under Ten	Ashley Johnson	Nominated
1993	Young Artist Awards	Outstanding Actress Under Ten in a Television Series	Ashley Johnson	Nominated

== Home media ==
Warner Home Video released the first two seasons on DVD in Region 1. Seasons 3-7 were released via the Warner Archive Collection as manufactured-on-demand titles, available exclusively through Warner's online store and Amazon.com.

In February 2023, Warner Bros. released Growing Pains: The Complete Series on DVD in Region 1.

DVDs of Growing Pains by release and region
DVD name	Eps	Region 1	Region 4
Season 1	22	February 7, 2006	June 5, 2007
Season 2	22	April 26, 2011	—N/a
Season 3	26	May 21, 2013	—N/a
Season 4	22	April 14, 2015	—N/a
Season 5	26	July 14, 2015	—N/a
Season 6	24	October 20, 2015	—N/a
Season 7	24	January 26, 2016	—N/a
Complete Series	166	February 28, 2023	—N/a

== Syndication ==
=== United States ===
ABC aired reruns of the show on its daytime schedule from July 1988 to August 1989. The show originally aired at 11:00 AM (ET) until January 1989, when Ryan's Hope was canceled and Home was expanded to an hour from 11:00 AM–noon. The reruns moved to noon.

In the fall of 1989, the show was sold to local syndication, which continued until 1997. The show also aired on TBS for several years premiering in October 1993 at 6:35 PM. The show continued to air on TBS until September 1996.

Reruns aired on the Disney Channel from September 1997 to September 2001. The cable rights for the show moved to sister network ABC Family, where it ran from 2001 to 2004. It has also aired on Ion Television during the fall of 2006 into the spring of 2007.

Nick at Nite began airing Growing Pains on February 12, 2007, launching with a marathon from 9:00 PM–1:00 AM. It was pulled from the line-up shortly after, and reruns later moved to sister network Noggin (as part of its teen block, The N). TeenNick re-aired the series on Monday, September 13, 2010, in a 5:00 AM hour block, and aired its final showings on December 27, 2010.

Growing Pains aired on Up TV from January 2015 to July 2017. Antenna TV began airing the series in December 2017 until it was moved to sister station Rewind TV when it launched on September 1, 2021, until its removal in November 2025.

It is also made available for streaming online on The Roku Channel from November 2019 to 2021 and then returned in 2025 (via their Howdy subscription-video-on demand [SVOD] service that launched in August of that year), as well as other FAST/AVOD services Tubi, Pluto TV, Plex and Xumo Play.

It is also made available for purchase on Amazon Prime Video.

=== Asia ===
Mainland China
The show was dubbed by Shanghai Television in the late 1980s Chéngzhǎng de Fánnǎo (成长的烦恼; literally "Growing vexation")
Taiwan
The show was dubbed by Chinese Television System in the 1980s–1990s Huānlè Jiātíng (歡樂家庭; Happy Family)
Japan
Growing Pains was dubbed in Japanese, and broadcast by the NHK of Japan in the title of "Yukai na Shiba Ke (愉快なシーバー家)" (Happy Seaver family) from 1997 to 2000
Indonesia
Growing Pains was broadcast by RCTI from September 1989 to August 1991 and re-run by SCTV from 1991 to around 1994.
Philippines
Growing Pains was aired by PTV-4 with Simulcast on GMA-7 in 1986–1991; it moved to ABC-5 in 1993–2000 with English Dubbed in 1993–1994 & Tagalized in 1994–2000

=== Europe ===
France
The show aired with the title Quoi de neuf docteur? (What's New Doctor?) on Antenne 2 from 1987 then as part of a block called Giga from February 19, 1990, on the same network.

Two books were published in French exclusively about Growing Pains: Cyrille Rollet, Ph.D. (EHESS, Paris),

Physiologie d'un sitcom américain (voyage au cœur de Growing Pains), (volume 1) – Physiology of an American Sitcom (Journey to the Heart of Growing Pains)
Circulation culturelle d'un sitcom américain (volume 2) – The Cultural Circulation of an American Sitcom
Germany
The show aired with the title Unser lautes Heim (Our Noisy Home) on ProSieben from 1993.
Italy
The show aired in 1987 with the title Genitori in blue jeans (Parents in Blue Jeans) where the first two seasons original aired on Canale 5 then it moved to Italia 1 for the later four seasons. This was also the name of an Italian comedy film from the 60s.
Netherlands
The show aired in 1986 with Dutch broadcast organization AVRO as Growing Pains in English with subtitles in Dutch.
Spain
In Spain the series aired with the title Los problemas crecen (Growing Problems) and was dubbed to Spanish. Originally aired in La 1 from the end of the 80s to the beginning of the 90s, and subsequently in La 2, Antena 3 y Factoría de Ficción.

=== Australasia ===
Australia
Digital free-to-air channel 7TWO began airing reruns of Growing Pains in October 2010, and reached the final episode in June 2011, replacing it with Night Court. The Nine Network first aired the show back in the 1980s and 1990s.
New Zealand
The show aired on TVNZ's TV2 on Saturday afternoons in the late 1980s-early 1990s.

=== Turkey ===
The show aired at the beginning of the 1990s on Turkey's first private TV channel, Star TV.

=== Latin America ===
The show was previously aired on Nickelodeon's block, Nick at Nite from 2006 to 2009.
