= Paulist Productions =

Catholic film production company

- Type: Private
- Industry: Entertainment
- Founded: 1960; 66 years ago
- Founders: Father Ellwood "Bud" Kieser, CSP
- Headquarters: Wilshire Blvd, Los Angeles, CA 90024, California, U.S.
- Key people: Mike Sullivan (President); Fr. Tom Gibbons, CSP (Vice-President); David Moore (Director of Development and Production)
- Brands: Insight (1960–1983) Paulist Pictures
- Owner: Paulist Fathers
- Parent: Independent (1960–present)
- Website: www.paulistproductions.org

Paulist Productions is an independent Catholic film production company founded in 1960 by the Paulist priest Father Ellwood "Bud" Kieser. The Paulists describe the company as a "creator of films and television programs that uncover God’s presence in the contemporary human experience".

As of 2018, producer Mike Sullivan is president of Paulist Productions.

Paulist has generated a range of programming for CBS, The History Channel, Hallmark Hall of Fame and UPtv.

== History ==
Ellwood "Bud" Kieser was born in Philadelphia in 1929. After graduating from La Salle College in 1950, he joined the Paulist Fathers. He earned his Ph.D. in theology of communications from the Graduate Theological Union in Berkeley, Calif. in 1973, writing his dissertation on Cinema as a Religious Experience.

The original purpose of the company was to produce Insight, an American religious-themed weekly anthology series that aired in syndication from October 1960 to January 1985. Insight earned six Emmy Awards during its twenty-three year run.

In 1974, the Humanitas Prize for film and television writing was founded by Kieser and the men and women of Paulist Productions.

In 1984, Paulist produced the ABC prime time special, The Fourth Wise Man. The New York Times reviewer, John J. O'Connor said, "Father Kieser has generally proved adept at attracting first-rate talent to Paulist projects, and The Fourth Wise Man indicates his powers of persuasion are stronger than ever." Adapted by Tom Fontana from the short story by Henry van Dyke Jr., the film starred Martin Sheen, Eileen Brennan and Alan Arkin.

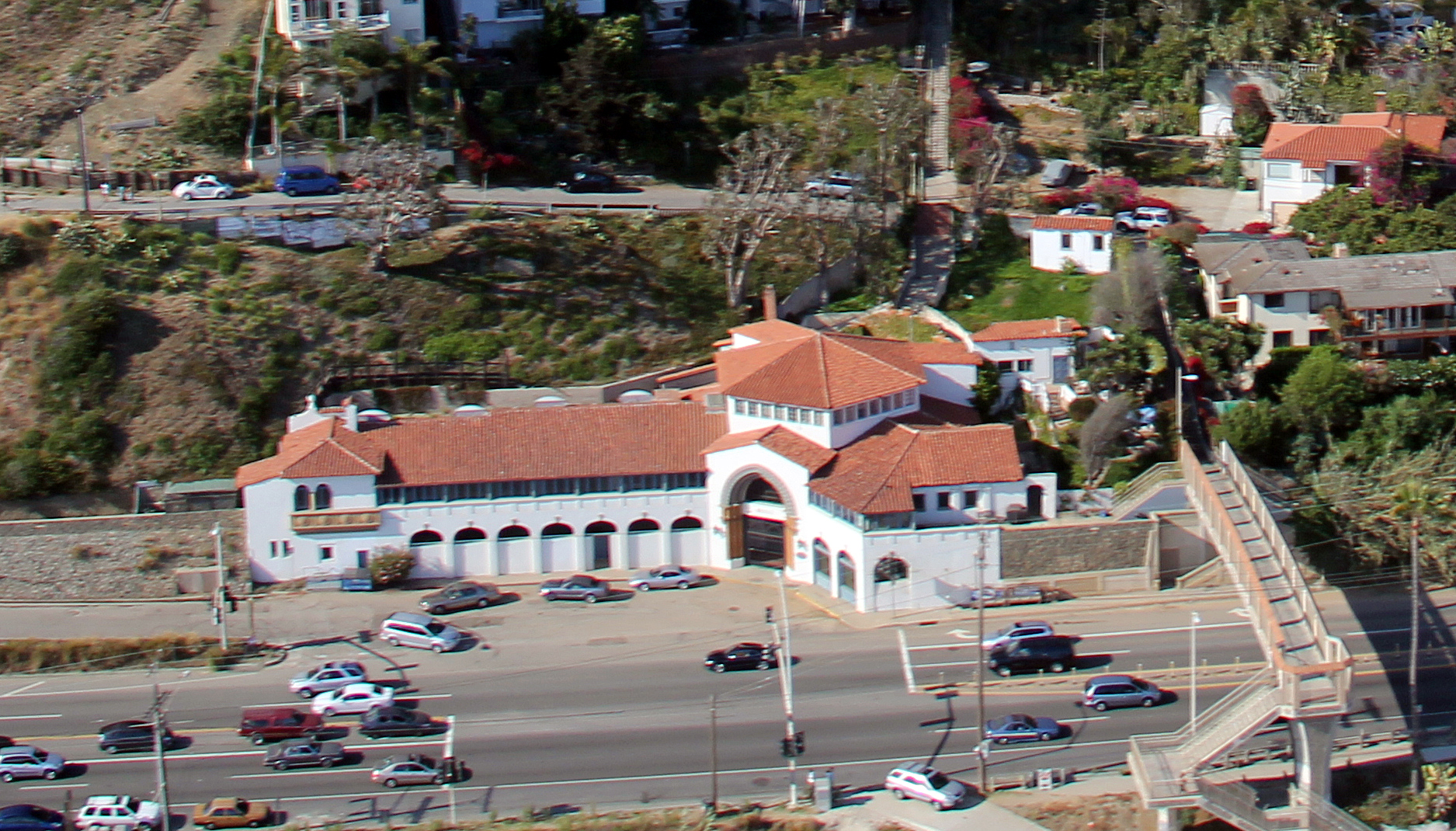
Paulist Productions Pacific Palisades

Paulist Pictures was later formed for the purpose of film production, creating the features Romero (1989) and Entertaining Angels: The Dorothy Day Story (1996).

After Kieser's death in September 2000, Frank Desiderio, C.S.P. became president of the company. He broadened the scope to produce television documentaries for the History Channel, including Judas - Traitor or Friend, Joseph: The Silent Saint, The Twelve Apostles, St. Peter: The Rock and Paul, the Apostle. Healing and Prayer: Power or Placebo was also produced for A&E. He was followed by Eric Andrews, C.S.P.

In 2004, Paulist Productions released the made-for-television film Judas which aired on ABC and was written by writer/producer Tom Fontana, who also served as executive producer.

In 2013, Paulist filmed the CBS special A New York Christmas to Remember. The special of Lessons and Carols was taped at St. Paul the Apostle Church with choirs from St. Paul’s and Fordham University’s Lincoln Center campus. Telecast on December 24 at 11:35 p.m., it also featured Regis Philbin and the nativity puppetry of Jane Henson.

Later productions include The Town That Came A-Courtin' and Christmas for a Dollar for UpTV, and the short Christmas film No Ordinary Shepherd. Paulist also released the short film He Knows My Name and finished production on the feature film The Miracle Maker. Chris Donahue was president of Paulist Productions from July 2014 to 2018, followed by Michael Sullivan. In 2015 Paulist Productions moved from Pacific Palisades to Wilshire Blvd. in Los Angeles.

On September 8, 2015, Deadline Hollywood reported that publisher Author Solutions (an imprint of Penguin) made a first-look deal with Paulist. In 2020, a documentary film, Fr. Bud: Hollywood Priest, was announced.

== See also ==
- Catholic television
- Catholic television channels
- Catholic television networks
