= The Growing Pains Movie =

2000 television film by Alan Metter

- DVD cover
- Genre: Comedy
- Based on: Growing Pains by Neal Marlens
- Written by: David Kendall; Michael Sullivan
- Directed by: Alan Metter
- Starring: Alan Thicke; Joanna Kerns; Kirk Cameron; Tracey Gold; Jeremy Miller; Ashley Johnson; Chelsea Noble; Brandon Douglas; Matthew Harbour
- Music by: Steve Dorff
- Country of origin: United States
- Original language: English

Production
- Executive producers: Michael Sullivan; David Kendall
- Producer: Alan Thicke
- Production locations: Montreal, Quebec, Canada; Los Angeles, California
- Cinematography: Yves Bélanger
- Editor: Peter Svab
- Running time: 88 minutes
- Production companies: How Do These Things Happen? Productions; Green/Epstein/Bacino Productions; Warner Bros. Television

Original release
- Network: ABC
- Release: November 5, 2000

Related
- Growing Pains; Growing Pains: Return of the Seavers

The Growing Pains Movie is a 2000 American comedy television film directed by Alan Metter and written by David Kendall and Michael Sullivan. It is the first of two reunion films based on the 1985–1992 sitcom Growing Pains. It premiered on ABC on November 5, 2000 as a two-hour episode of The Wonderful World of Disney anthology series.

== Plot ==
Eight years later, Mike Seaver is married with four children and now a successful executive in advertising. Carol is a successful Wall Street lawyer; Ben works in real estate; and Chrissy is a 17-year-old high school student.

Chrissy works with her mother, a press secretary, but soon Maggie is fired. However, she decides to enter the election campaign herself and run against her old boss. During the campaign, Carol meets the other campaign manager, Scott Coffer, and falls in love with him and his 10-year-old son Jack.

However, Carol realizes dating him could put her mother's campaign in jeopardy so she breaks up with him. Knowing his father had real feelings for Carol, Jack takes matters into his own hands and asks her brother Mike to come up with a scheme to get Carol and his dad back together again. Mike agrees because he witnessed how happy his sister was with Scott.

At the end of the movie, Maggie wins the election, and Carol and Scott get married.

== Cast ==
=== Main ===
- Alan Thicke as Jason Seaver, now a practicing psychologist in Washington, D.C. and has become the author of mystery novels such as "Dr. Dick Hollister".
- Joanna Kerns as Maggie Seaver, now the press secretary of an arrogant congressman.
- Kirk Cameron as Mike Seaver, married to Kate MacDonald, Vice-President of the Genasse Advertising Agency.
- Tracey Gold as Carol Seaver, graduated 3rd in her class at Columbia University is now a Corporate Lawyer.
- Jeremy Miller as Ben Seaver, an "entrepreneur" of a failed California company.
- Ashley Johnson as Chrissy Seaver, as college film studies major who longs to be a singer.
- Chelsea Noble as Kate MacDonald-Seaver, married to Mike Seaver.
- Brandon Douglas as Scott Coffer, Campaign manager and Carol's love interest.
- Matthew Harbour as Jack Coffer, Scott's son.

=== Guest ===
- Francis Xavier McCarthy as Mac Robinson.

== Home media ==
On December 6, 2011, Warner Archive Collection released The Growing Pains Movie along with Growing Pains: Return of the Seavers on DVD in Region 1.
