= Insight (American TV series) =

American television series

- Insight logo early 1960s to early 1970s
- Genre: Anthology
- Created by: Fr. Ellwood Kieser CSP
- Written by: Various, including: Michael Crichton; Ellwood Kieser, CSP; Rod Serling
- Directed by: Various
- Presented by: Fr. Ellwood Kieser CSP
- Country of origin: United States
- Original language: English
- No. of seasons: 23
- No. of episodes: 250

Production
- Editor: Peter H. Rosen “Music Spotting” @ Newjack Sound Recorders
- Camera setup: multiple-camera
- Running time: 22-24 mins.
- Production company: Paulist Productions

Original release
- Network: Syndication
- Release: October 2, 1960 – January 21, 1985

Insight is an American religious-themed weekly anthology series that aired in syndication from October 1960 to 1983. Insight holds a unique place in the history of public service television programming. Produced by Paulist Productions in Los Angeles, it was an anthology series, using an eclectic set of storytelling forms including comedy, melodrama, and fantasy to explore moral dilemmas.

The series was created by Catholic priest Ellwood E. "Bud" Kieser, the founder of Paulist Productions. A member of the Paulist Fathers, an evangelistic Catholic order of priests, he worked in the entertainment community in Hollywood as a priest-producer and occasional host, using television as a vehicle of spiritual enrichment. Many of the episodes of the series were videotaped at Television City Studios and then Metromedia Square.

It is the longest-running religious drama program ever, and the longest-running weekly syndicated program until Soul Train surpassed it in 1996 (only Entertainment Tonight, Wheel of Fortune, Jeopardy! and Extra have had longer runs).

== Overview ==
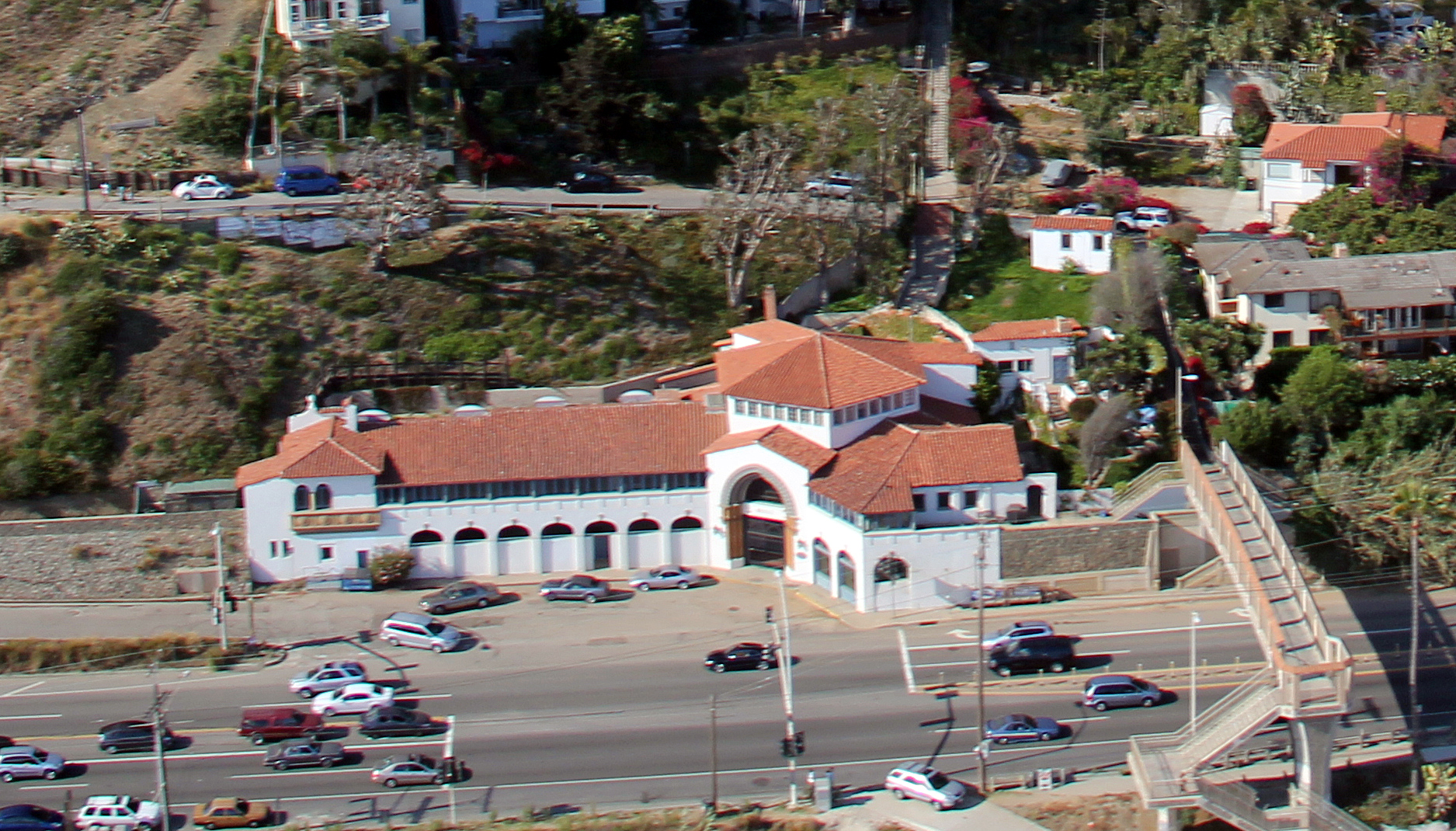
Paulist Productions, Pacific Palisades

Early episodes were produced at CBS Television City. Some of the very earliest episodes were largely videos of Kieser speaking, similar to Fulton J. Sheen's East Coast program, although even these episodes were interspersed with episodes that were dramatized stories. By the second season, Kieser switched to an anthology series focused solely on dramatized stories; the approach was more humanist, than strictly Catholic. The program slowly began to attract well-known writers, directors, and actors, many of whom donated their services or worked for union scale. Kieser appeared in each episode through the 1960s to discuss the program's theme—usually after an opening teaser, and again at the program's end. This practice was dropped by the early 1970s, though Kieser remained the show's executive producer throughout its long run, and occasional script writer.

Typically shown on Sunday mornings or late night, the program aired nationally for well over two decades. Often stations aired Insight in order to meet the Federal Communications Commission's public interest standard for broadcast television. In its heyday Insight was played in syndication on over 195 stations. Occasionally it was even broadcast at prime-time in major markets as "holiday specials".

Actor Patrick McGeehan narrated several episodes. Actress Lola Lane sold the Paulists a property on Pacific Coast Highway that had previously belonged to her late husband, director Roland West.

== Contributing artists ==
The anthology format and the religious nature of the program attracted a wide variety of actors, directors and writers to work on the series, drawn by the show’s reputation for consistently stretching the creative boundaries of television. In many cases they donated their talents and time.

=== Actors ===
- Jack Albertson
- John Amos
- Edward Andrews
- Elizabeth Ashley
- Ed Asner
- John Astin
- Diane Baker
- Joy Bang
- Patricia Barry
- Billy Barty
- Meredith Baxter
- Henry Beckman
- Ed Begley
- Ed Begley Jr.
- Christine Belford
- Richard Benjamin
- Herschel Bernardi
- Carl Betz
- Richard Beymer
- Bill Bixby
- Lloyd Bochner
- Tom Bosley
- Eileen Brennan
- Beau Bridges
- Jeff Bridges
- Walter Brooke
- Albert Brooks
- Roscoe Lee Browne
- Gary Burghoff
- Carol Burnett
- Terry Burnham
- Michael Burns
- Joseph Campanella
- Lynn Carlin
- Leo G. Carroll
- Joanna Cassidy
- Hans Conried
- Elisha Cook Jr.
- Henry Corden
- Bud Cort
- Anthony Costello
- Jeanne Crain
- James Cromwell
- Patricia Crowley
- Robert Culp
- William Daniels
- Ann B. Davis
- Davey Davison
- Laura Dern
- Melinda Dillon
- Ivan Dixon
- James Doohan
- Howard Duff
- Patty Duke
- Irene Dunne
- Emilio Estevez
- Wesley Eure
- James Farentino
- Jamie Farr
- Marty Feldman
- Norman Fell
- John Fiedler
- Peter Fonda
- John Forsythe
- Robert Foxworth
- Anne Francis
- James Franciscus
- Steve Franken
- Vincent Gardenia
- Beverly Garland
- Terri Garr
- Ellen Geer
- Frank Gorshin
- Louis Gossett Jr.
- Harold Gould
- Kathryn Grant
- Gene Hackman
- Mark Hamill
- Barbara Hale
- Jackie Earle Haley
- Jonathan Harris
- Bob Hastings
- Anne Helm
- Barbara Hershey
- Darryl Hickman
- Dwayne Hickman
- Celeste Holm
- Clint Howard
- Ron Howard
- Jeffrey Hunter
- Kim Hunter
- Ruth Hussey
- Ann Jillian
- Brian Keith
- Paula Kelly
- Ricky Kelman
- Lance Kerwin
- Werner Klemperer
- Jack Klugman
- Harvey Korman
- Steve Landesberg
- Robert Lansing
- Britt Leach
- Michael Learned
- Harvey Lembeck
- Michael Lembeck
- Mark Lenard
- June Lockhart
- Ida Lupino
- Randolph Mantooth
- Kenneth Mars
- William Marshall
- Nan Martin
- Raymond Massey
- Jerry Mathers
- Walter Matthau
- Tim Matheson
- Rue McClanahan
- Maureen McCormick
- Lee Meriweather
- Vera Miles
- Donna Mills
- Roger Mobley
- Ricardo Montalbán
- Juanita Moore
- Greg Morris
- Greg Mullavey
- Bill Mumy
- Lois Nettleton
- Bob Newhart
- Nichelle Nichols
- Cliff Norton
- Carroll O'Connor
- J. Pat O'Malley
- Alan Oppenheimer
- Nehemiah Persoff
- Paul Picerni
- Eve Plumb
- Andrew Prine
- Della Reese
- Allan Rich
- Peter Mark Richman
- John Ritter
- Marion Ross
- Maggie Roswell
- Richard Schaal
- William Shatner
- Michael Shea
- Martin Sheen
- Gregory Sierra
- Henry Silva
- Everett Sloane
- Paul Sorvino
- Ann Sothern
- James Stacy
- Guy Stockwell
- Barry Sullivan
- Nita Talbot
- Vic Tayback
- Marlo Thomas
- Philip Michael Thomas
- Malachi Throne
- Meg Tilly
- Cicely Tyson
- Dick Van Patten
- James Westerfield
- Cindy Williams
- Flip Wilson
- William Windom
- Deborah Winters
- Jane Wyman
- Keenan Wynn
- Dick York
- Efrem Zimbalist Jr.

=== Directors ===
- Lew V. Adams
- Richard C. Bennett
- Richard Beymer
- Robert Butler
- Hal Cooper
- Marc Daniels
- Linda Day
- Mel Ferber
- Arthur Hiller
- Lamont Johnson
- Buzz Kulik
- Norman Lloyd
- J.D. Lobue
- John Meredyth Lucas
- Delbert Mann
- John Newland
- Daniel Petrie
- Ted Post
- Michael Ray Rhodes
- Seymour Robbie
- Jay Sandrich
- Ralph Senensky
- Jack Shea
- Paul Stanley

=== Writers ===
- Bernard Abbene
- William Peter Blatty
- Michael Crichton
- John T. Dugan
- Harry Julian Fink
- Jack Hanrahan
- Fr. Ellwood Kieser CSP
- John Meredyth Lucas
- Lan O'Kun
- William P. McGivern
- John McGreevey
- James E. Moser
- Gilbert Ralston
- Michael Ray Rhodes
- Rod Serling
- Terrance Sweeney
- E. Sarsfield Waters
- Stanford Whitmore
- John Rester Zodrow

== Awards and nominations ==
Offbeat and experimental by design, the series won numerous Emmy Awards and received critical praise for addressing social issues. Insight was nominated for the Emmy for Outstanding Achievement in Religious Programming in 1972 and 1973, and won the category every year from 1981 to 1984.

In 2003, UCLA Film and Television Archive became custodian of Paulist Productions’ physical inventory of Insight videos and films. "'Insight' represents something that doesn’t exist anymore: faith-based, scripted, quality TV programming, delivered free to television stations for broadcast,” said Father Frank Desiderio, Kieser's successor at Paulist Productions. Episodes are available for purchase from the Paulist Press.
