= Jeremy Miller =

American actor (b. 1976)

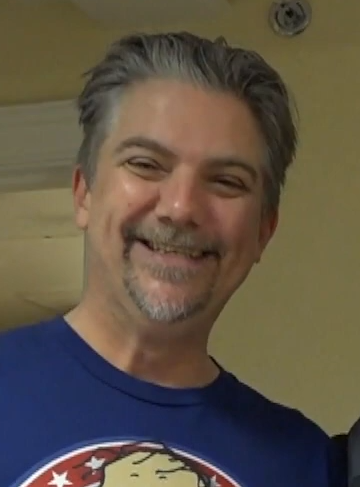
- Miller in 2024
- Born: Jeremy James Miller; October 21, 1976 (age 50); Covina, California, US
- Occupation: Actor
- Years active: 1984–present
- Spouse: Joanie Miller

Jeremy James Miller (born October 21, 1976) is an American actor, known mostly as a child actor. He is known for his portrayal of Ben Seaver on the TV series Growing Pains and its two reunion movies. He also voiced Linus van Pelt in the animated TV specials Happy New Year, Charlie Brown! and Snoopy!!! The Musical.

== Early life, family and education ==
Born in Covina, California, Miller began acting as a youth.

Miller attended the University of Southern California for one year.

== Career ==
Miller began acting professionally in a few commercials, then he landed a 1984 guest role in the kid-centered TV series Punky Brewster. He subsequently was cast as Ben Seaver, the youngest sibling on TV series Growing Pains. The show ran for seven seasons (1985-1992) and spawned two TV movies: The Growing Pains Movie (2000) and Growing Pains: Return of the Seavers (2004). He also voiced Linus van Pelt in the animated TV specials Happy New Year, Charlie Brown! (1986) and Snoopy!!! The Musical (1988), and an episode of This Is America, Charlie Brown (1988). He starred in the 1990 Hanukah episode of Shalom Sesame (an American/Israeli coproduction of Sesame Street).

After Growing Pains, Miller appeared in the films Dickie Roberts: Former Child Star (2003) and Milk and Fashion (2007). He had a small role in The Boys & Girls Guide to Getting Down. He performed in commercials for McDonald's "Dollar Menunaires" promotion shot as a parody of the VH1 series Best Week Ever. Miller also appeared in a special celebrity team-up episode of Where in the World Is Carmen Sandiego? facing off against Mayim Bialik from Blossom, and Tatyana Ali from The Fresh Prince of Bel-Air. He and his partner proceeded to the bonus round at the end of the episode, but they did not win the big prize.

He performed in four movies that were due to be released in 2009: Ditching Party, Never Have I Ever, The Fish and Tar Beach.

In 2011, Miller became a spokesperson for Fresh Start Private Management Inc., the rehabilitation company that administered his treatment.

== Personal life ==
At about age 14, during the run of Growing Pains, Miller received numerous letters from an older male stalker.

He is married to Joanie Miller, and he has three stepsons.

Miller explained in 2000 that he was diagnosed with attention deficit disorder, which affected his ability to concentrate and focus on school. In April 2014, while promoting Fresh Start Recovery of Santa Ana, California, Miller stated that he started drinking alcohol at age four, and once the TV series Growing Pains ended, he began binge drinking. He explained that he suffered from alcohol abuse for years, and that his stepsons were afraid of him because of his alcoholism, until he had an implant that released the drug Naltrexone into his system.

He had a catering business, but it failed after the 2008 financial crisis. Alan Thicke helped him get a job in a restaurant.

His hobbies have included poker and cooking.

== Filmography ==
Year	Title	Role	Notes
1984	Pryor's Place	Gladys's nephew	1 episode ("Sax Education")
1984	Punky Brewster	Jimmy	1 episode
1985	Deceptions	Mark Richards	TV movie
1985–92	Growing Pains	Ben Seaver	Main role Young Artist Award for Best Young Supporting Actor in a New Television Series; Young Artist Award for Exceptional Performance by a Young Actor in a Television Comedy Series; Nominated - Young Artist Award for Best Young Actor Starring in a Television Series; Nominated - Young Artist Award for Exceptional Performance by a Young Actor in a Long Running Series Comedy or Drama
1986	Happy New Year, Charlie Brown!	Linus van Pelt (voice)	TV special
1987	Emanon	Jason Ballantine	
1987	Shalom Sesame	Special Guest	
1988	Snoopy!!! The Musical	Linus van Pelt (voice)	TV special
1988	This Is America, Charlie Brown	Linus Van Pelt	1 episode
1990	The Willies	Brad	
1992	Ghostwriter	Craig Mitchell	4 episodes
1993	Based on an Untrue Story	Jackie	TV movie
2000	Scooby-Doo and the Alien Invaders	Additional Voices (voice)	Direct to Video
2000	The Growing Pains Movie	Ben Seaver	TV movie
2004	Growing Pains: Return of the Seavers	Ben Seaver	TV movie
2006	Von's Room	Guest	
2007	Milk and Fashion	Jack	
2009	Never Have I Ever	Glenn Brandis	
2010	Ditching Party	Jim	
2021	True to the Game	Detective Derek	
