= Ashley Johnson =

American actress (born 1983)

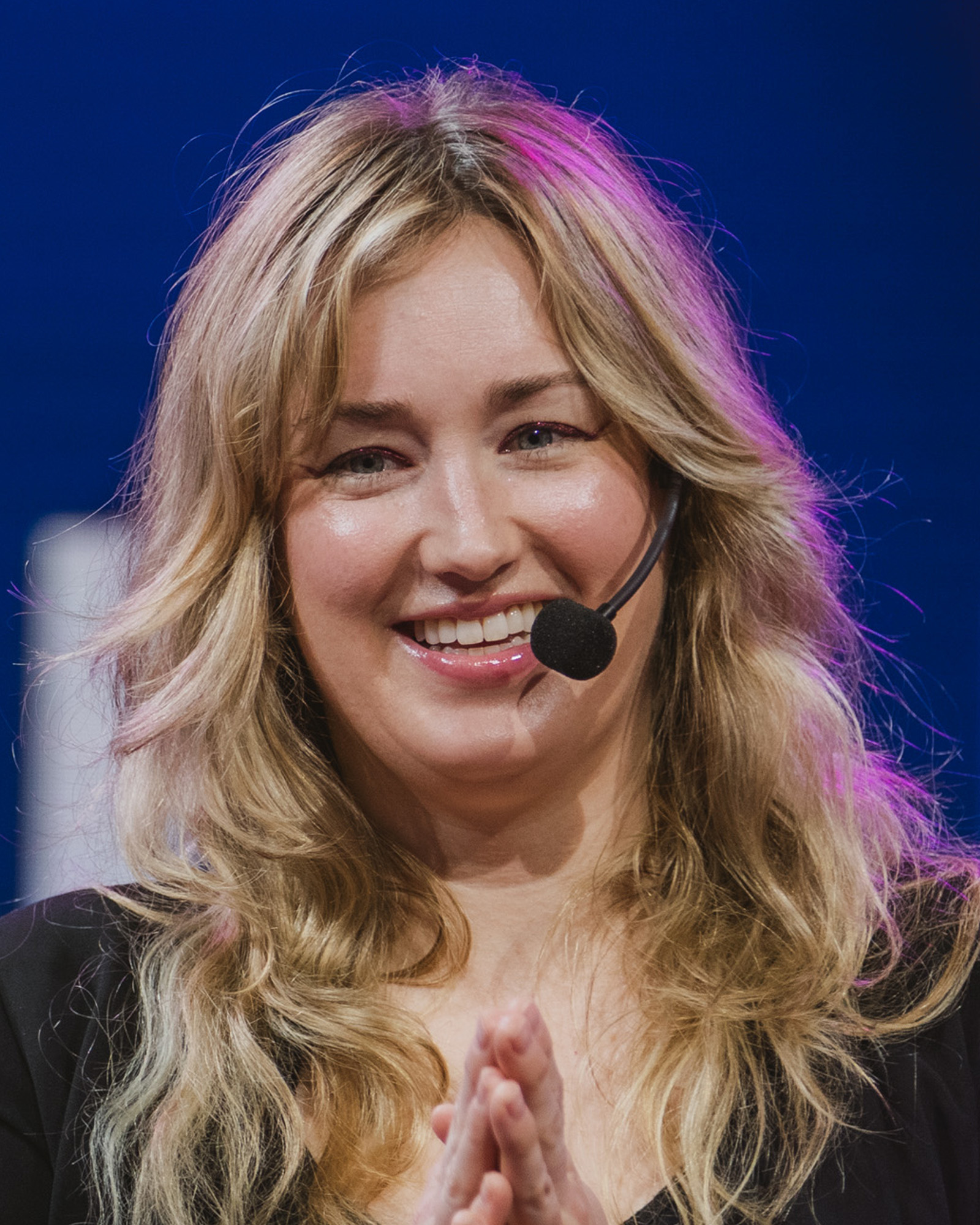
- Johnson in 2024
- Born: Ashley Suzanne Johnson; August 9, 1983 (age 43); Camarillo, California, U.S.
- Occupation: Actress
- Years active: 1990–present
- Relatives: Jonny Lang (brother-in-law)

Ashley Suzanne Johnson (born August 9, 1983) is an American actress. She became known as a child actor for her role as Chrissy Seaver on the sitcom Growing Pains (1990–1992). As an adult, her television roles include Amber Ahmed on The Killing (2011–2012) and Patterson on Blindspot (2015–2020). She has appeared in films such as What Women Want (2000), Fast Food Nation (2006), The Help (2011), and Much Ado About Nothing (2012), and is a cast member on the Dungeons & Dragons web series Critical Role (2015–present). She became the president of the show's charity branch, the Critical Role Foundation, upon its launch in 2020.

Johnson provided the voice and motion capture of Ellie in the video games The Last of Us (2013), The Last of Us: Left Behind (2014), and The Last of Us Part II (2020). She also voiced animated television characters Gretchen Grundler on Recess (1997–2001), Terra on Teen Titans (2004–2006) and Teen Titans Go! (2013–present), Jinmay on Super Robot Monkey Team Hyperforce Go! (2004–2006), Gwen Tennyson in the Ben 10 franchise (2008–2014), Renet Tilley on Teenage Mutant Ninja Turtles (2012), Shiseru on Naruto: Shippuden (2015), Tulip Olsen and Lake on Infinity Train (2019–2020), Pike in The Legend of Vox Machina (2022–present), and Purple in Among Us (2026). Her other video game work includes voicing Gortys in Tales from the Borderlands (2014) and Petra in Minecraft: Story Mode (2015–2016) and its sequel (2017).

Johnson has won two BAFTA Games Awards for Performer, winning once each for her performances in The Last of Us and The Last of Us: Left Behind and is the only person to have won the award more than once. She also received multiple nominations for her performance in The Last of Us Part II.

== Early life ==
Ashley Suzanne Johnson was born on August 9, 1983, in Camarillo, California, the daughter of former test pilot Nancy (née Spruiell) and exploration ship captain Cliff Johnson. She has an older brother named Chris and an older sister named Haylie, both of whom have also worked as actors. Her sister later married singer and musician Jonny Lang. Her father was often away for months at a time and would bring back souvenirs from countries such as Japan. He started a new job nine days after Johnson was born and subsequently moved the family to Franklin, Michigan, where they lived for a few years before returning to California and settling in Los Angeles. Johnson attended school in nearby Burbank when her acting career allowed but otherwise had an on-set teacher. She later studied violin and piano at the International School of Music in Glendale. When she was 16, her father died of complications from hepatitis C and cancer of the liver and lungs. Johnson needed a back brace for three years due to scoliosis and kyphosis, which affected her during her high school years.

== Career ==
Johnson's career began at age six, when she played the role of Chrissy Seaver on the sitcom Growing Pains from 1990 to 1992. The character's age was accelerated from a toddler between seasons for plotting purposes. By the time she was 12, Johnson had been in the casts of eight television series. She later reprised her role as Chrissy in The Growing Pains Movie and Growing Pains: Return of the Seavers. In the one season series Phenom (1993–94), she played the mischievous younger sister of a rising teenage tennis star. She appeared in the 1994 sitcom All-American Girl, which also lasted for only one season. She played DJ's overbearing girlfriend Lisa in the Roseanne episode "The Blaming of the Shrew". During the 1995–96 ABC lineup, she played Gracie Wallace in the sitcom Maybe This Time. She played Alex Marshall in the 2000 comedy What Women Want. In 2008, she became a regular on the drama Dirt as Sharlee Cates. In 2009, Johnson appeared in "Omega", the first-season finale of Joss Whedon's Dollhouse.

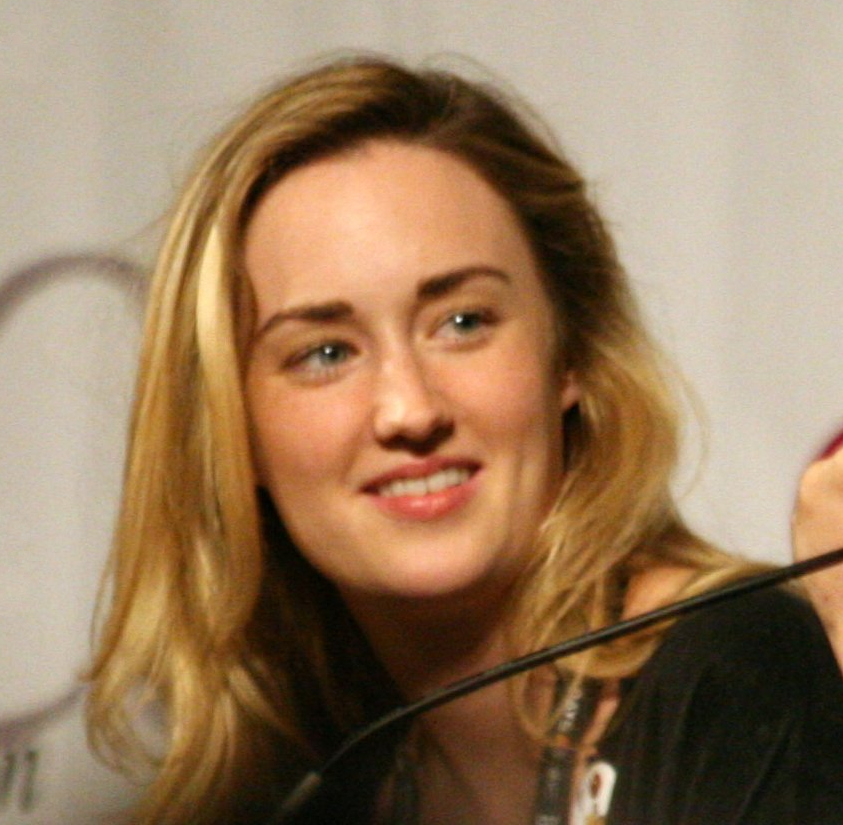
Johnson in 2014

In 2012, she appeared in The Avengers (also directed by Whedon) as Beth, the waitress who is saved by Captain America. She was intended to appear in future films as his newest love interest (as implied in a brief scene in the film), but that plan was shelved and instead actress Emily VanCamp's Sharon Carter character became involved with Rogers. Although her role was minor, the Blu-ray edition of The Avengers contains some deleted scenes that expand her role in the film and further her interactions with Rogers. From 2015 to 2020, Johnson played FBI forensic specialist Patterson in the NBC drama series Blindspot.

As a voice actress, Johnson's earlier roles included Sean in the English dub of The First Snow of Winter, Gretchen Grundler on Disney's Recess, Terra in the second and fifth seasons of Teen Titans, Jinmay on Super Robot Monkey Team Hyperforce Go! and Gwen Tennyson in the Ben 10 franchise. A major voice role came when she provided the voice and motion capture for Ellie in the PlayStation action-adventure game The Last of Us, which was released to critical acclaim and commercial success. She won a video game BAFTA for Best Performer, a VGX Award for Best Voice Actress, and a D.I.C.E. Award for Outstanding Character Performance for her role in the game. On March 12, 2015, she won another BAFTA for Best Performer for the same role in the game's downloadable content, The Last of Us: Left Behind. In 2015, she voiced Petra the Warrior in Minecraft: Story Mode by Telltale Games and Mojang. In 2016, she voiced Tulip Olsen in the pilot for Infinity Train and reprised the role for the series in 2019, additionally voicing Lake and the Steward.

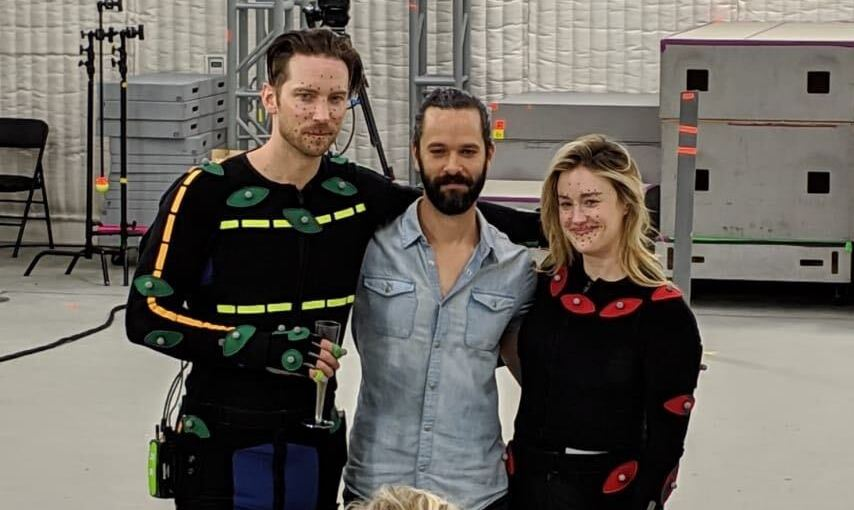
Johnson (right) on the final day of motion capture production of The Last of Us Part II with Neil Druckmann (center) and Troy Baker (left)

In 2020, Johnson reprised the role of Ellie in The Last of Us Part II. For her performance, she was nominated for Best Performance at The Game Awards 2020, for Outstanding Achievement in Character at the 24th Annual D.I.C.E. Awards, and for Best Performer in a Leading Role at the 17th British Academy Games Awards. She portrayed Ellie's mother, Anna, in the live-action adaptation of The Last of Us. On her performance in the adaptation, The Daily Beast commented that "with less than 10 minutes of screen time, Johnson gives us one of the best scenes of The Last of Us".

Johnson appeared in several Geek & Sundry shows, including playing occult specialist Morgan on the web series Spooked, as well as the Alhambra and Dead of Winter episodes on the board gaming web series TableTop. In 2015, she began playing Pike Trickfoot on the Dungeons & Dragons actual play show Critical Role; in 2018, she began playing Yasha Nydoorin in the show's second campaign. Critical Role was both the Webby Winner and the People's Voice Winner in the "Games (Video Series & Channels)" category at the 2019 Webby Awards; the show was also both a finalist and the Audience Honor Winner at the 2019 Shorty Awards. After becoming hugely successful, the Critical Role cast left the Geek & Sundry network in early 2019 and set up their own production company, Critical Role Productions. Soon after, they aimed to raise $750,000 on Kickstarter to create an animated series of their first campaign, but ended up raising over $11 million. In November 2019, Amazon Prime Video announced that they had acquired the streaming rights to this animated series, now titled The Legend of Vox Machina; Johnson reprised her role as Pike Trickfoot. In late 2020, she was made president of the Critical Role Foundation, the studio's charity branch. In June 2021, she was added to the cast of Exandria Unlimited, an anthology spinoff of Critical Role. Three months later, she served as gamemaster for The Nautilus Ark, her own one-shot episode on the Critical Role channel. In October 2021, Johnson's Exandria Unlimited character Fearne Calloway returned in Critical Role's third campaign.

Johnson set up a photography company called Infinity Pictures with Mila Shah, her childhood best friend who works as a production assistant and occasional actress; there have been no updates on the company for many years, though it is still registered as active as of 2022. Johnson and Shah also co-hosted a podcast called Wildly Hot & Bothered, which ran for 13 episodes from 2012 to 2014. In 2015, they created and starred in Little Things, a web miniseries on YouTube about two friends living in Los Angeles and their habit of making awkward everyday situations even worse. The series was not released on YouTube until 2018.

== Personal life ==
The first campaign of Critical Role began two years prior to the start of the series as a one-off, simplified Dungeons & Dragons game for Liam O'Brien's birthday. The players enjoyed the game so much that they continued to play it and brought in additional friends, including Johnson, who joined in the second game. After Felicia Day heard about the private home game from Johnson, she approached the group about playing it in a live-streamed format for Geek & Sundry.

Johnson enjoys singing and can play the guitar, piano, violin, and cello; she occasionally posted covers of songs on her SoundCloud page until late 2012. Her performance as Ellie in The Last of Us Part II included acoustic guitar covers of "Future Days" by Pearl Jam, "Take On Me" by A-ha, "True Faith" by New Order, and "Through the Valley" by Shawn James. She also joined co-star Troy Baker (in character as Ellie and Joel) to perform a cover of Johnny Cash's rendition of "Wayfaring Stranger", which plays over the end credits of the game. She later provided vocals for the Critical Role theme songs "Your Turn to Roll" and "It's Thursday Night".

In 2012, Johnson began dating writer and musician Brian W. Foster, who later hosted the Critical Role after-show Talks Machina. They were first introduced by Troy Baker, Foster's roommate at the time, during the making of The Last of Us. In December 2018, they announced their engagement. In May 2023, Johnson separated from Foster and filed a restraining order against him, citing abuse and threats. All videos and mentions of Foster were wiped from the online profiles of Critical Role. In October 2023, Johnson and six other women (including her sister and two Critical Role employees) filed a lawsuit against Foster that alleged assault, domestic violence, gender violence, sexual battery, stalking, civil rights violations, and intentional infliction of emotional distress. In January 2025, it was announced that the case had been dismissed after all parties involved in the lawsuit reached a private settlement.

== Filmography ==
=== Film ===
Year	Title	Role	Notes
1990	Lionheart	Nicole Gaultier	
1995	Nine Months	Shannon Dwyer	
1998	Dancer, Texas Pop. 81	Josie Hemphill	
1998	The First Snow of Winter	Sean McDuck (voice)	US dub; short film
1999	Anywhere but Here	Sarah	
2000	What Women Want	Alex Marshall	
2001	Recess: School's Out	Gretchen Grundler (voice)	
2001	Recess Christmas: Miracle on Third Street	Gretchen Grundler (voice)	Direct-to-video
2001	Rustin	Lee Wolford	
2003	The Failures	Lilly Kyle	
2003	Recess: All Growed Down	Gretchen Grundler (voice)	Direct-to-video
2003	Recess: Taking the Fifth Grade	Gretchen Grundler (voice)	Direct-to-video
2004	Killer Diller	Angie	
2004	King of the Corner	Elena Spivak	
2005	Nearing Grace	Merna Ash	
2006	Fast Food Nation	Amber	
2006	Grad Night	Student	
2007	The Brothers Solomon	Patricia	
2008	Columbus Day	Alana	
2008	Otis	Riley Lawson	
2009	Spread	Eva	
2010	Christmas Cupid	Jenny	
2011	The Help	Mary Beth Caldwell	
2012	The Avengers	Beth	
2012	Much Ado About Nothing	Margaret	
2015	When Marnie Was There	Emily, Miyoko (voice)	English dub
2016	Punching Henry	Danielle	
2018	All You Can Eat	Liza	

=== Television ===
Year	Title	Role	Notes	Ref.
1990–1992	Growing Pains	Chrissy Seaver	Main role (seasons 6–7)	
1993	Men Don't Tell	Cindy	Television film	
1993	The Town Santa Forgot	Granddaughter (voice)	Television special	
1993	Timmy's Special Delivery: A Precious Moments Christmas	Holly, additional voices	Television special	
1993–1994	Phenom	Mary Margaret Doolan	Main role	
1994	All-American Girl	Casey Emmerson	Main role	
1995	Annie: A Royal Adventure!	Annie Warbucks	Television film	
1995	Roseanne	Lisa	Episode: "The Blaming of the Shrew"	
1995	What a Cartoon!	Mina (voice)	Episode: "Mina and the Count: Interlude with a Vampire"	
1995–1996	Maybe This Time	Gracie Wallace	Main role	
1996–1999	Jumanji	Peter Shepherd (voice)	40 episodes	
1997	Moloney	Kate Moloney	3 episodes	
1997	Wings	Rebecca	Episode: "Ms. Write"	
1997–2001	Recess	Gretchen Grundler (voice)	129 episodes	
1998	ER	Dana Ellis	2 episodes	
1998	Kelly Kelly	Maureen Kelly	Main role	
2000	The Growing Pains Movie	Chrissy Seaver	Television film	
2001	What About Joan?	Jody Bradford	Episode: "It's a Mad, Mad, Mad, Mad Joan"	
2002	Ally McBeal	Serena Feldman	Episode: "Heart and Soul"	
2002	The Guardian	Betsy Fortunato	Episode: "Sacrifice"	
2002	Lloyd in Space	Violet (voice)	4 episodes	
2002	Providence	Daphne Wallace	3 episodes	
2002	Roswell	Eileen Burrows	2 episodes	
2002	Touched by an Angel	Natalie Tate	Episode: "Bring On the Rain"	
2003–2004	Married to the Kellys	Shari	2 episodes	
2004	Growing Pains: Return of the Seavers	Chrissy Seaver	Television film	
2004–2006	Super Robot Monkey Team Hyperforce Go!	Jinmay (voice)	12 episodes	
2004–2006	Teen Titans	Terra (voice)	7 episodes	
2004–2010	King of the Hill	Emily, Jamie (voice)	7 episodes	
2005	The X's	Kimla (voice)		
2006	Lilo & Stitch: The Series	Gretchen Grundler (voice)	Episode: "Lax"	
2007	Heartland	Rebecca Colton	Episode: "Mother & Child Reunion"	
2007	Monk	Susie the Maid	Episode: "Mr. Monk Is at Your Service"	
2007, 2014	CSI: Crime Scene Investigation	Dreama Little, Brothel Girl	2 episodes	
2008	Dirt	Sharlee Cates	Recurring role (season 2)	
2008	The Mentalist	Clara Tennant	Episode: "Seeing Red"	
2008	The Middleman	Eleanor Draper	Episode: "The Ectoplasmic Panhellenic Investigation"	
2008	Raising the Bar	Elise Denton	Episode: "Hang Time"	
2008–2010	Ben 10: Alien Force	Gwen Tennyson, additional voices	45 episodes	
2009	Cold Case	Graces Stearns (1966)	Episode: "The Crossing"	
2009	Dollhouse	Wendy, Caroline, Hayden Leeds	2 episodes	
2010	Funny or Die Presents	Girlfriend	1 episode	
2010	Lie to Me	Valerie	Episode: "Beat the Devil"	
2010–2018	Drunk History	Various	3 episodes	
2010–2012	Ben 10: Ultimate Alien	Gwen Tennyson, additional voices	52 episodes	
2011	In Plain Sight	Sarah Collins, Sarah Peterschwim	Episode: "Something A-mish"	
2011–2012	The Killing	Amber Ahmed	Recurring role (season 1); special guest (season 2)	
2011–2013	Pound Puppies	Amelia, Toyo, Gina, Giblet, Kid #1 (voice)	6 episodes	
2012	Drop Dead Diva	Veronica Kramer	Episode: "Road Trip"	
2012	Private Practice	Kelly	Episode: "The Time Has Come"	
2012–2014	Ben 10: Omniverse	Gwen Tennyson, additional voices	21 episodes	
2013	Masters of Sex	Flora Banks	Episode: "Fallout"	
2013–present	Teen Titans Go!	Terra (voice)	6 episodes	
2014	Garfunkel and Oates	Jane	Episode: "Speechless"	
2015	Naruto: Shippuden	Shiseru (voice)	English dub; 6 episodes	
2015	Stalker	Stephanie Beekman	Episode: "My Hero"	
2015–2017	Teenage Mutant Ninja Turtles	Renet (voice)	6 episodes	
2015–2020	Blindspot	Patterson	Main role	
2019–2020	Infinity Train	Tulip Olsen, Mirror Tulip / Lake, Steward (voice)	20 episodes	
2021	Close Enough	Kristen (voice)	Episode: "Where'd You Go, Bridgette?"	
2021	Family Guy	Lisa (voice)	Episode: "Customer of the Week"	
2022–present	The Legend of Vox Machina	Pike Trickfoot (voice)	Main role; also executive producer	
2023	The Last of Us	Anna	Episode: "Look for the Light"	
2025–present	The Mighty Nein	Yasha Nydoorin, additional voices (voice)	Main role; also executive producer	
2026	Among Us	Purple (voice)		

=== Video games ===
Year	Title	Role	Notes
2005	Teen Titans	Terra	
2008	Ben 10: Alien Force	Gwen Tennyson	
2009	Ben 10 Alien Force: Vilgax Attacks	Gwen Tennyson	
2009	FusionFall	Gwen Tennyson	
2010	Ben 10 Alien Force: The Rise of Hex	Gwen Tennyson	
2010	Ben 10 Ultimate Alien: Cosmic Destruction	Gwen Tennyson	
2013	The Last of Us	Ellie	Voice and motion capture VGX Award for Best Voice Actress; BAFTA Games Award for Best Performer; D.I.C.E. Award for Outstanding Character Performance
2014	The Last of Us: Left Behind	Ellie	Also motion capture 2014 BAFTA Games Award for Best Performer
2014	Infamous First Light	Jenny	
2014	Tales from the Borderlands	Gortys, Hyperion System	"Hyperion System" is credited as "additional voices"
2014	Final Fantasy Explorers	Additional voices	English version
2015	Skylanders: SuperChargers	Gadfly Glades collector / additional voices	
2015	Minecraft: Story Mode	Petra	
2016	The Witness	Additional voices	
2016	Lego Marvel's Avengers	Beth the Waitress	
2017	Minecraft: Story Mode – Season Two	Petra	
2018	Pillars of Eternity II: Deadfire	Narrator, Pike Trickfoot, Ydwin	Critical Role DLC
2020	The Last of Us Part II	Ellie	Voice and motion capture Nominated for Best Performance at The Game Awards 2020; Nominated for Best Performer in a Leading Role at 2020 BAFTA Games Award; Nominated for Outstanding Achievement in Character at the 24th Annual D.I.C.E. Awards; 2021 NAVGTR Award for Outstanding Performance in a Drama, Lead
2023	Stray Gods: The Roleplaying Musical	Calliope	
2025	Date Everything!	Beau	
2025	Dispatch	Ashley Rhiness, Brainbook	

=== Web series ===
Year	Title	Role	Notes
2013–2015	Tabletop	Herself	2 episodes
2015–present	Critical Role	Pike Trickfoot (campaign 1)	Main cast; actual play ongoing series
2015–present	Critical Role	Yasha Nydoorin (campaign 2)	Main cast; actual play ongoing series
2015–present	Critical Role	Fearne Calloway, Trist (campaign 3)	Main cast; actual play ongoing series
2015–present	Critical Role	Vaelus (campaign 4)	Main cast; actual play ongoing series
2020	Animal Talking with Gary Whitta	Herself (voice)	1 episode
2021	Exandria Unlimited	Fearne Calloway	8 episodes; actual play limited series
2023	Candela Obscura	Auggie James	3 episodes; actual play limited series
2025	Age of Umbra	Misty	Actual play limited series using the Daggerheart system
2025-present	Weird Kids	Herself	Podcast co-host

=== Audio books ===
Year	Title	Role	Notes
2022	Critical Role: The Mighty Nein – The Nine Eyes of Lucien	Yasha Nydoorin	
2025	Critical Role: Vox Machina - Stories Untold	Narrator	
2026	Critical Role: Mighty Nein - Stories Untold	Narrator	
