= Joanna Kerns =

American actress and director

- Occupations: Actress; director
- Years active: 1976–present
- Spouses: Richard Kerns (m. 1976; div. 1985); Marc Appleton (m. 1994; div. 2019)
- Children: 1
- Relatives: Donna de Varona (sister); Miriam Cooper (aunt)

Joanna Kerns is an American actress and director best known for her role as Maggie Seaver on the ABC sitcom Growing Pains from 1985 to 1992.

== Career ==
=== Early roles ===
Kerns got her start in show business as a dancer before turning to acting. She attended UCLA and majored in dance. There, she saw an advertisement for a Gene Kelly production called Clown Around and applied for an audition. To take the part, however, she would have to drop out of college and move to New York, which she did. After Clown Around, Joanna also got parts in the New York Shakespeare Festival's production of Two Gentlemen of Verona and Ulysses in Nighttown, where she was directed by Burgess Meredith. Meredith also introduced Kerns to Peggy Feury, under whom Kerns studied acting. In 1972, she moved back to California and landed a job as a backup dancer at Disneyland, and started auditioning for TV commercials and steady acting jobs.

On May 4, 1977, she made an appearance on Charlie's Angels as Natalie, a worker at a massage parlor in the episode "The Blue Angels".

During the late 1970s and early 1980s, Kerns started making a name for herself in guest spots on many televisions shows that included: Emergency!, CHiPs, The A-Team, Starsky & Hutch, Street Hawk, Laverne and Shirley, Three's Company, Hill Street Blues, The Love Boat, Hunter, Quincy, M.E., Magnum, P.I., and V, as well as many commercials. During an interview, Kerns said, "I kind of was always looking for the next thing; I auditioned for anything, hoping to get a big break" (Lifetime's Intimate Portrait). Then, Kerns got her first steady acting job in 1983, starring as Pat Devon in a new CBS series called The Four Seasons, which lasted only one season. The sitcom, which was based on a 1981 movie of the same name, was about three couples who all lived under the same roof in California. Although the show was not well received by television critics, her part proved to producers that she was capable of acting as a leading lady.

=== Growing Pains ===
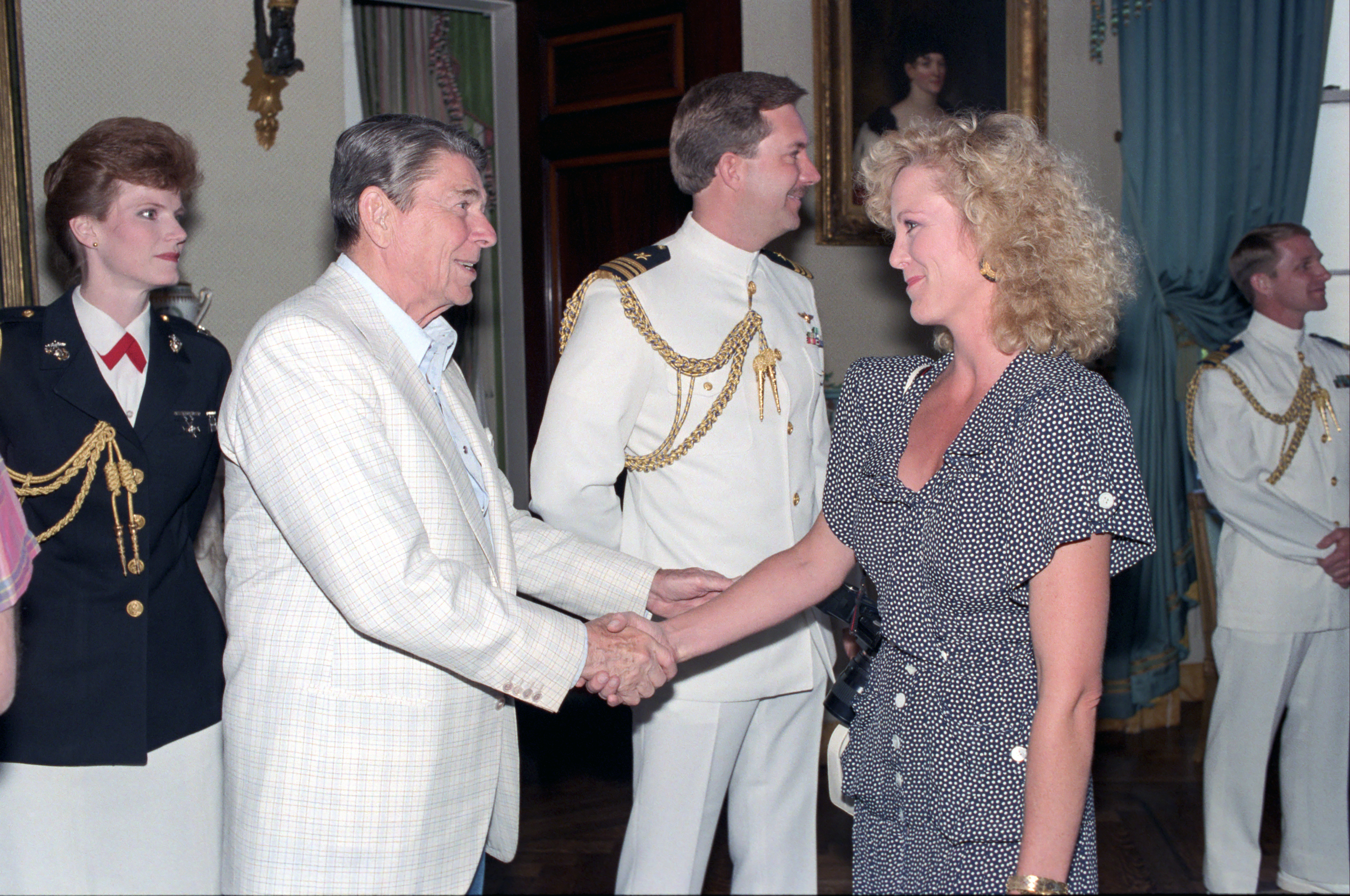
President Ronald Reagan meeting Joanna Kerns (1987)

Soon after the cancellation of The Four Seasons, Kerns auditioned with Alan Thicke for a new family sitcom called Growing Pains. Kerns joked in interviews that Alan and she had immediate chemistry, especially when she kissed him on his nose by accident during their audition together. Kerns and Thicke's chemistry won them both the parts, and the two became great friends off the show. The successful show, which dealt with two working parents raising their kids, ran on ABC from 1985-1992. Kerns reprised her role in two reunion TV movies, The Growing Pains Movie (2000) and Growing Pains: Return of the Seavers (2004).

During the success of Growing Pains, Kerns began to star in television movies, where she played controversial parts very different from the beloved all-American mom, Maggie Seaver. One such performance that shocked audiences was her 1992 movie, The Nightman, in which Kerns played a highly sexual business woman who was a motel owner. Her many TV movies include: Those She Left Behind, Blind Faith, The Big One: The Great Los Angeles Earthquake, Shameful Secrets, and No One Could Protect Her.

=== After Growing Pains roles and directing career ===
After Growing Pains ended, Kerns turned to directing. She directed one episode of Growing Pains while starring on the show and got hooked. In an interview, Kerns stated, "I was always fascinated by the difference in the quality of work by what director I had. They would have not just a great storytelling sense, but also a great cinematic sense." She loved directing and decided to change the focus of her career from acting to directing, while continuing to make rare appearances in front of the camera when the right parts came along. She has also directed episodes of television shows including Dawson's Creek, Titans, Scrubs, Private Practice, Psych, Felicity, Grey's Anatomy, Privileged, ER, Ghost Whisperer, Army Wives, Pretty Little Liars, Switched at Birth, The Goldbergs, This Is Us, and Fuller House. Kerns also directed Annie Potts in an original made-for-television movie for Lifetime TV entitled: Defending Our Kids: The Julie Posey Story. She has since made a number of shorts, and directed the sixth episode of Pitch, a sports drama on Fox.

Kerns has also made notable appearances in feature films, including A*P*E (1976), Girl, Interrupted (1999), and the comedy Knocked Up (2007).

She has also co-founded the Women in Film Crystal + Lucy Awards given to women in acting.

Kerns was a member of the Motion Picture and Television Fund Board of Trustees from 2004 through 2008.

== Personal life ==
Kerns's older sister is Olympic swimmer Donna de Varona and her aunt was silent film actress Miriam Cooper. She also had a younger brother, Kurt.

Kerns competed in gymnastics in the Olympic trials in 1968 and ranked 14th out of 28.

In 1974, Kerns met a commercial producer, Richard Kerns, on the set of a commercial, and they married two years later. Their marriage lasted nine years and the couple had a daughter, Ashley Cooper. In 1994, Kerns married Marc Appleton, a prominent Los Angeles architect. In August 2019, Kerns filed for divorce from Appleton.

Kerns was romantically involved with comedian and actor Freddie Prinze a short time before he died of suicide. The two had worked together on the 1976 TV movie, The Million Dollar Rip-Off.

In 2004, Kerns wrote a letter of support for convicted sex offender Brian Peck, who had worked on Growing Pains, ahead of his sentencing for sexually abusing a 14-or-15-year-old minor in 2001, since revealed to be actor Drake Bell. Following the release of the documentary Quiet on Set: The Dark Side of Kids TV (2024), Kerns stated that she was misinformed when writing the letter and "Knowing what I know now, I never would have written it."

In 2016, Kerns underwent a double mastectomy after being diagnosed with breast cancer, specifically a ductal carcinoma in situ.

She has raised funds for Planned Parenthood.

== Filmography ==
Year	Title	Role	Notes
1976	A.P.E.	Marilyn Baker	as Joanna DeVarona
1976	Starsky & Hutch	Joy	Episode: "Gillian", as Joanna De Varona
1976	The Million Dollar Rip-Off	Jessie	TV film
1977	Charlie's Angels	Natalie Sands	Episode: "The Blue Angels"
1977	Quincy, M.E.	Lily	Episode: "Touch of Death"
1977	Emergency!	Gymnast	Episode: “Firehouse Quintet” (Listed as Joanna DeVarona)
1978	Coma	Diane	
1980	Three's Company	Bobby Trilling	Episode: "The Love Lesson"
1980	Marriage is Alive and Well	Meg	TV film
1981	CHiPs	Dr. Colleen Jacobs	Episode: "Dead Man's Riddle"
1982	A Wedding on Walton's Mountain	Doris Marshall	TV film
1982	Mother's Day on Waltons Mountain	Doris Marshall	TV film
1982	Magnum, P.I.	Mary Kanfer	Episode: "The Last Page"
1983	V	Marjorie Donovan	TV miniseries
1983	The A-Team	Trish Brenner	Episode: "A Nice Place to Visit"
1983	Three's Company	Cheryl	Episode: "Jack Be Quick"
1983	Magnum, P.I.	Jenny 'Jen' Hunter	Episode: "Two Birds of a Feather"
1984	The Return of Marcus Welby, M.D.	Pamela Saletta	TV film
1985–1992	Growing Pains	Maggie Seaver	TV series. Main role.
1985	A Bunny's Tale	Andrea	TV film
1985	Stormin' Home	Lana Singer	TV film
1985	The Rape of Richard Beck	Anita Parrish	TV film
1987	Mistress	Stephanie	TV film
1987	Cross My Heart	Nancy	
1989	Street Justice	Catherine Watson	TV film
1989	Those She Left Behind	Diane Pappas	TV film
1989	The Preppie Murder	Linda Fairstein	TV film
1990	Blind Faith	Maria Marshall	TV film
1990	The Great Los Angeles Earthquake	Dr. Clare Winslow	TV film
1991	An American Summer	Aunt Sunny	
1991	Deadly Intentions... Again?	Sally	TV film
1991	Captive	Kathy Plunk	TV film
1992	The Nightman	Eve	TV film
1992	Desperate Choices: To Save My Child	Mel Robbins	TV film
1993	Not in My Family	Veronica Ricci	TV film
1993	The Man with Three Wives	Katy	TV film
1993	Shameful Secrets	Maryanne Walker-Tate	TV film
1994	No Dessert, Dad, till You Mow the Lawn	Carol Cochran	
1994	Mortal Fear	Dr. Jennifer Kessler	TV film
1995	See Jane Run	Jane Ravenson	TV film
1995	Whose Daughter Is She?	Laura Eagerton	TV film
1996	No One Could Protect Her	Jessica Rayner	TV film
1996	Terror in the Family	Cynthia Martin	TV film
1997	Mother Knows Best	Celeste Cooper	TV film
1997	Sisters and Other Strangers	Gail Connelly Metzger	TV film
1998	Emma's Wish	Emma	TV film
1999	At the Mercy of a Stranger	Elizabeth Cooper	TV film
1999	Girl, Interrupted	Annette Kaysen	
2000	The Growing Pains Movie	Maggie Malone Seaver	TV film
2001	All Over the Guy	Lydia	
2001	Someone to Love	Matt's mother	TV film
2004	Growing Pains: Return of the Seavers	Maggie Seaver	TV film
2007	Knocked Up	Mrs. Scott	
2007	Manic	Dr. Kerns	Short film
2009	Eastwick	Edie	Episode: "Tears and Mind Erasers"
2010	Love & Other Unstable States of Matter	Joan	Short film
2017	Danny Brown: Ain't It Funny	Mom	

=== Director ===
Year	Title	Notes
1988–1992	Growing Pains	2 episodes
1995	The Mommies	2 episodes
1995	Hope & Gloria	Episode: "A Dupree Family Christmas"
1997–1998	Remember WENN	2 episodes
1997–1999	Clueless	3 episodes
1998	Suddenly Susan	Episode: "Poetry in Notion"
1998–1999	Love Boat: The Next Wave	2 episodes
1999–2001	Ally McBeal	2 episodes
2000–2002	Any Day Now	4 episodes
2000	Beggars and Choosers	2 episodes
2000	Titans	Episode: "Payback's a Bitch"
2001	Boston Public	Episode: "Chapter Fourteen"
2001	That's Life	Episode: "Something Battered, Something Blue"
2001	Judging Amy	Episode: "The Right Thing to Do"
2001–2002	Felicity	2 episodes
2002	Leap of Faith	
2002–2003	Strong Medicine	3 episodes
2002	For the People	Episode: "Come Blow Your Whistle"
2002	Dawson's Creek	Episode: "The Importance of Not Being Too Earnest"
2003	The O'Keefes	Episode: "Substitute Teacher"
2003	Defending Our Kids: The Julie Posey Story	TV movie
2004	The Division	Episode: "Rush to the Door"
2004	One Tree Hill	Episode: "You Can't Always Get You Want"
2004–2006	Scrubs	2 episodes
2004	Growing Pains: Return of the Seavers	TV movie
2004	Clubhouse	Episode: "Trade Talks"
2005	Phil of the Future	Episode: "Double Trouble"
2005	Dr. Vegas	Episode: "Babe in the Woods"
2005	Joan of Arcadia	Episode: "Romancing the Joan"
2005	Related	2 episodes
2005	Ghost Whisperer	2 episodes
2006	ER	2 episodes
2006–2008	Men in Trees	4 episodes
2007–2008	Psych	2 episodes
2007	Medium	Episode: "Head Games"
2007–2012	Army Wives	6 episodes
2008	Notes from the Underbelly	Episode: "Friends and Neighbors"
2008	The Gold Lunch	Short
2008	Privileged	Episode: "All About Friends and Family"
2008	Grey's Anatomy	Episode: "Rise Up"
2008	Private Practice	Episode: "Serving Two Masters"
2009	Samantha Who?	Episode: "The Dream Job"
2011	Gigantic	Episode: "Back to Normal"
2011	Friends with Benefits	Episode: "The Benefit of the Right Track"
2012–2013	The Lying Game	2 episodes
2012–2016	Pretty Little Liars	4 episodes
2013–2014	The Fosters	2 episodes
2013–2014	Switched at Birth	3 episodes
2014–2015	Chasing Life	2 episodes
2015–2016	Jane the Virgin	3 episodes
2015	Awkward	Episode: "The Big Reveal"
2015	Nashville	Episode: "The Slender Threads That Bind Us Here"
2015–2016	Crazy Ex-Girlfriend	2 episodes
2016	Recovery Road	Episode: "Parties Without Borders"
2016–2018	The Goldbergs	3 episodes
2016	Pitch	Episode: "Wear It"
2016	Fuller House	3 episodes
2018	This Is Us	Episode: "Vegas, Baby"
2018	Man with a Plan	Episode: "Everybody's a Winner"
2018	American Woman	Episode: "The Cost of Living"
2018	The Good Doctor	Episode: "Empathy"
2019	Dynasty	Episode: "How Two-Faced Can You Get?"
2019	What/If	Episode: "What History"
2019	Light as a Feather	4 episodes
2019	Mad About You	Episode: "Happy Birthday, Bon Voyage, Goodbye for Now"
2019	High School Musical: The Musical: The Series	6 episodes
2020	The Baker and the Beauty	Episode: "Get Carried Away"
2020	Roswell, New Mexico	Episode: Crash into Me"
2020	Tiny Pretty Things	2 episodes
2021	FBI	Episode: "Short Squeeze"
2021	Why Women Kill	Episode: "The Woman in Question"
2021–2023	A Million Little Things	6 episodes
2023	Night Court	2 episodes
2024–2025	Chicago Med	2 episodes
2024	Happy's Place	Episode: "Don't Sweat It"
