= Michael Sullivan (filmmaker) =

American film maker

Michael Sullivan is an American film maker who has numerous film and television credits as a writer, director, and producer. He was the president of entertainment for the United Paramount Network (UPN) from 1994 – 1997.

Sullivan began his career at ABC in 1976 and by the early 80s was named director of comedy development. He left the network in 1983 for Warner Bros. TV, where he became executive producer of the sitcom Growing Pains. In 1993, he formed Michael Sullivan Productions, an independent firm; but in 1994 joined UPN where he helped launch the hit series Star Trek: Voyager. He remained at UPN until 1997. He then returned to being an independent producer.

Having served on the advisory board of Paulist Productions, Sullivan became president in 2018.
