= John Tracy (director) =

American television director

- Occupation: Television director
- Years active: 1969–2006

John Tracy is an American television director.

His career began in 1969 serving as one of the associate directors of What's My Line?. He then went on to direct episodes of The Electric Company, Angie, Laverne & Shirley, Joanie Loves Chachi, Who's the Boss?, Full House, Newhart, Remington Steele, Family Matters, Yes, Dear, Still Standing and Growing Pains, directing 134 episodes out of the 166 of the series.
