= Evan Arnold =

American actor

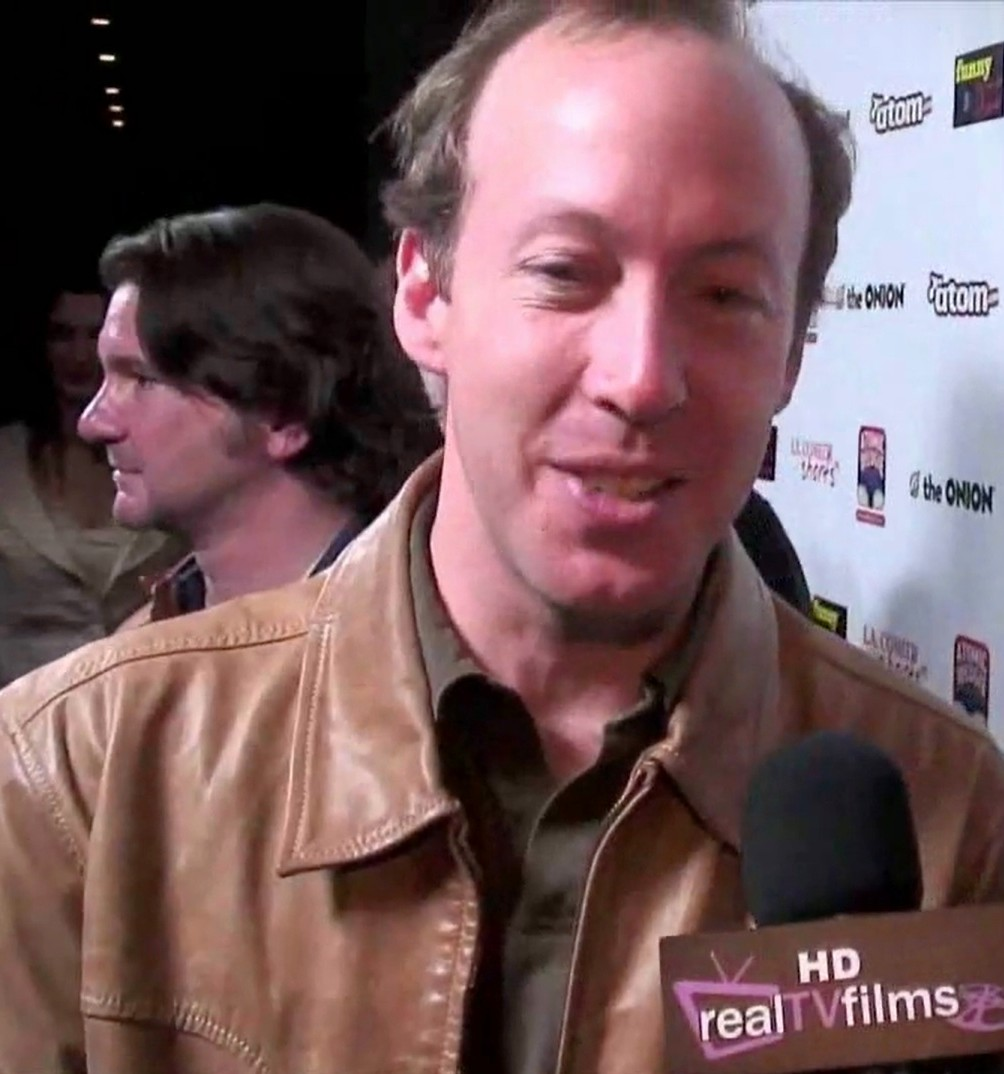
Arnold in 2009

Evan Arnold is an American actor. He played Richie Flanscopper on Growing Pains, Gavin Doosler on Just the Ten of Us, Ned Carlson on The West Wing, Jeffrey Ambor on Close to Home, Chef Alan on Suburgatory, Dr. Ditmer on Masters of Sex, and David Hillier in L.A. Noire. He also played the role of Leonard in the series finale of Mad Men.

Arnold is married and has two children. His late father, Newt Arnold, won a Directors Guild of America Award for his work as assistant director of The Godfather Part II. His mother, Judy Arnold, was a theatrical producer. He has been a friend of Eric Garcetti, a former mayor of Los Angeles, since they were in junior high school, and is godfather to the mayor's daughter.

== Filmography ==
| Year | Title | Role | Notes |
|---|---|---|---|
| 1986 | Monster in the Closet | Beaver | |
| 1990 | The Willies | Counter Guy | |
| 1996 | What Do Women Want | Geek #2 | |
| 1999 | Inkslingers | Mad Adam | |
| 1999 | Fare Well Miss Fortune | | |
| 2001 | Mission | Victor | |
| 2002 | Spider-Man | Doctor | |
| 2002 | Hip, Edgy, Sexy, Cool | Sexy Cop #2 | |
| 2004 | Garfield: The Movie | Wendell | |
| 2004 | Illusion | Techie | |
| 2008 | This Is Not a Test | Cliff Beauchamp | |
| 2008 | All God's Children Can Dance | Angry Neighbor | |
| 2009 | Punching the Clown | Don Chase | |
| 2013 | Tuna | Brian | |
| 2016 | The List | Doctor | |
| 2017 | Jimmy the Saint | Businessman | |
| 2017 | Limerence | Donald | |
| 2018 | Blood Clots | Jay | |
| 2019 | Ford v Ferrari | SCCA Official | |
