= 35th Golden Raspberry Awards =

Award ceremony presented by the Golden Raspberry Award Foundation in 2014

- Date: February 21, 2015
- Site: Montalban Theatre, Los Angeles, California

Highlights
- Worst Picture: Saving Christmas
- Most awards: Saving Christmas (4)
- Most nominations: Transformers: Age of Extinction (7)

The 35th Golden Raspberry Awards, or Razzies, was an awards ceremony that identified the worst films the film industry had to offer in 2014, according to votes from members of the Golden Raspberry Foundation. Razzies co-founder John J. B. Wilson has stated that the intent of the awards is "to be funny." The pre-nomination ballot was revealed on December 31, 2014, and final nominations were revealed on January 14, 2015. The winners were announced on February 21, 2015, at a ceremony that was open to the public for the first time in the award's history.

== Winners and nominees ==
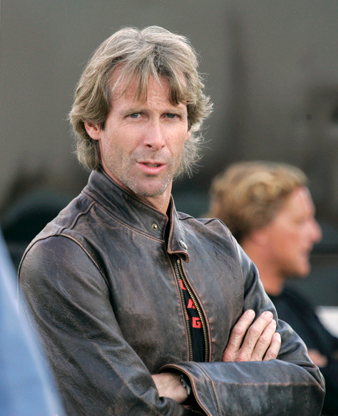
Michael Bay, Worst Director winner

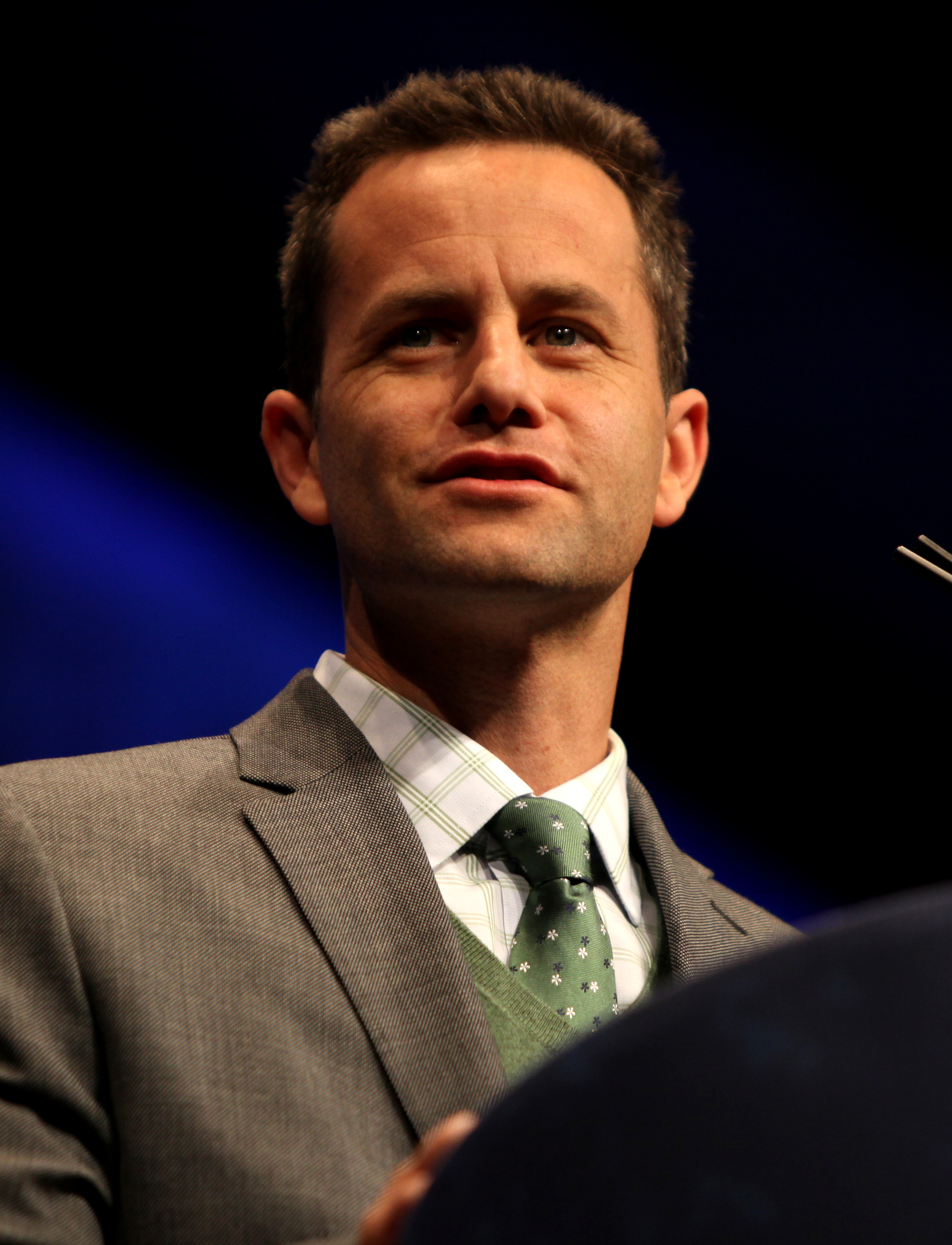
Kirk Cameron, Worst Actor and Worst Screen Combo winner

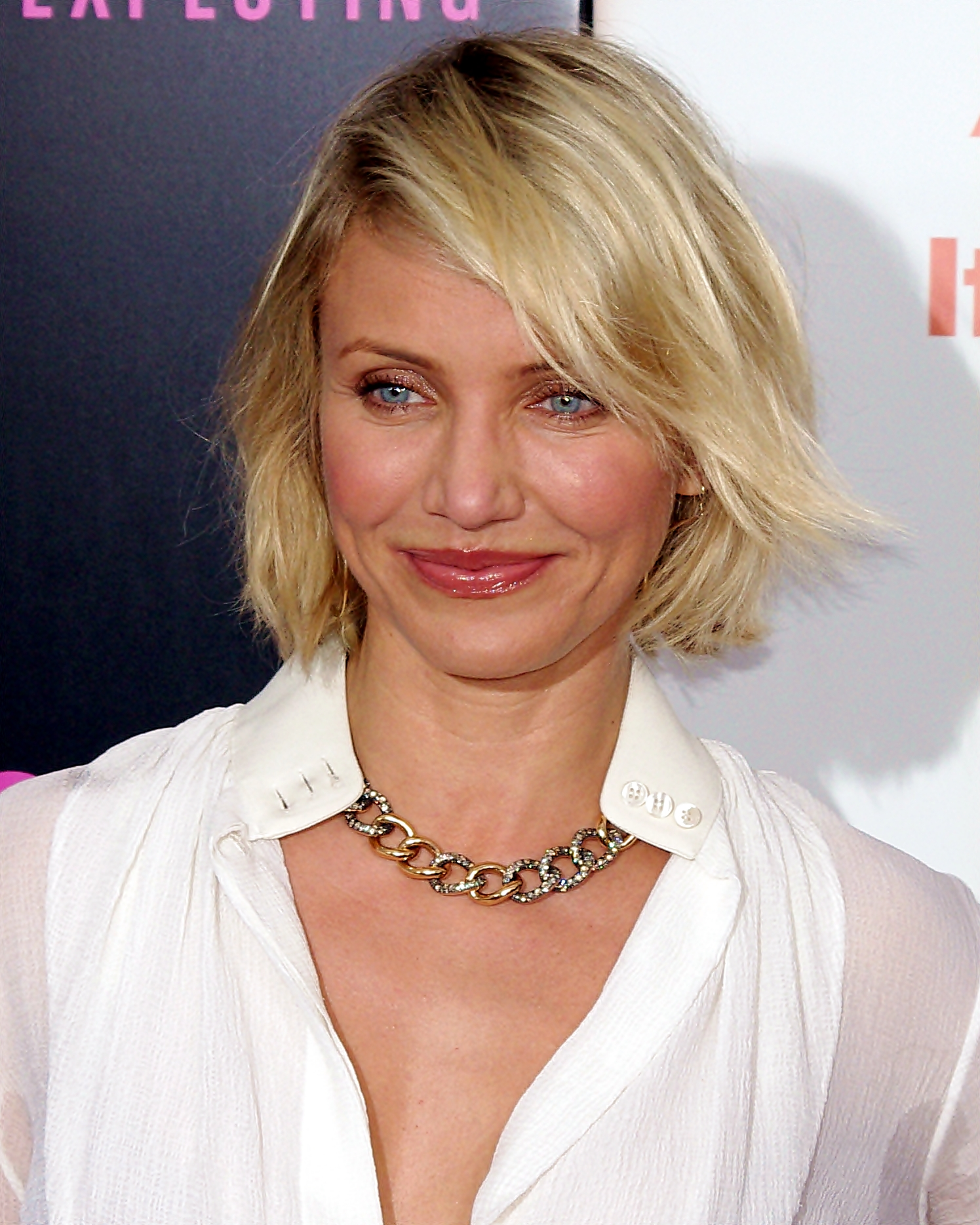
Cameron Diaz, Worst Actress winner

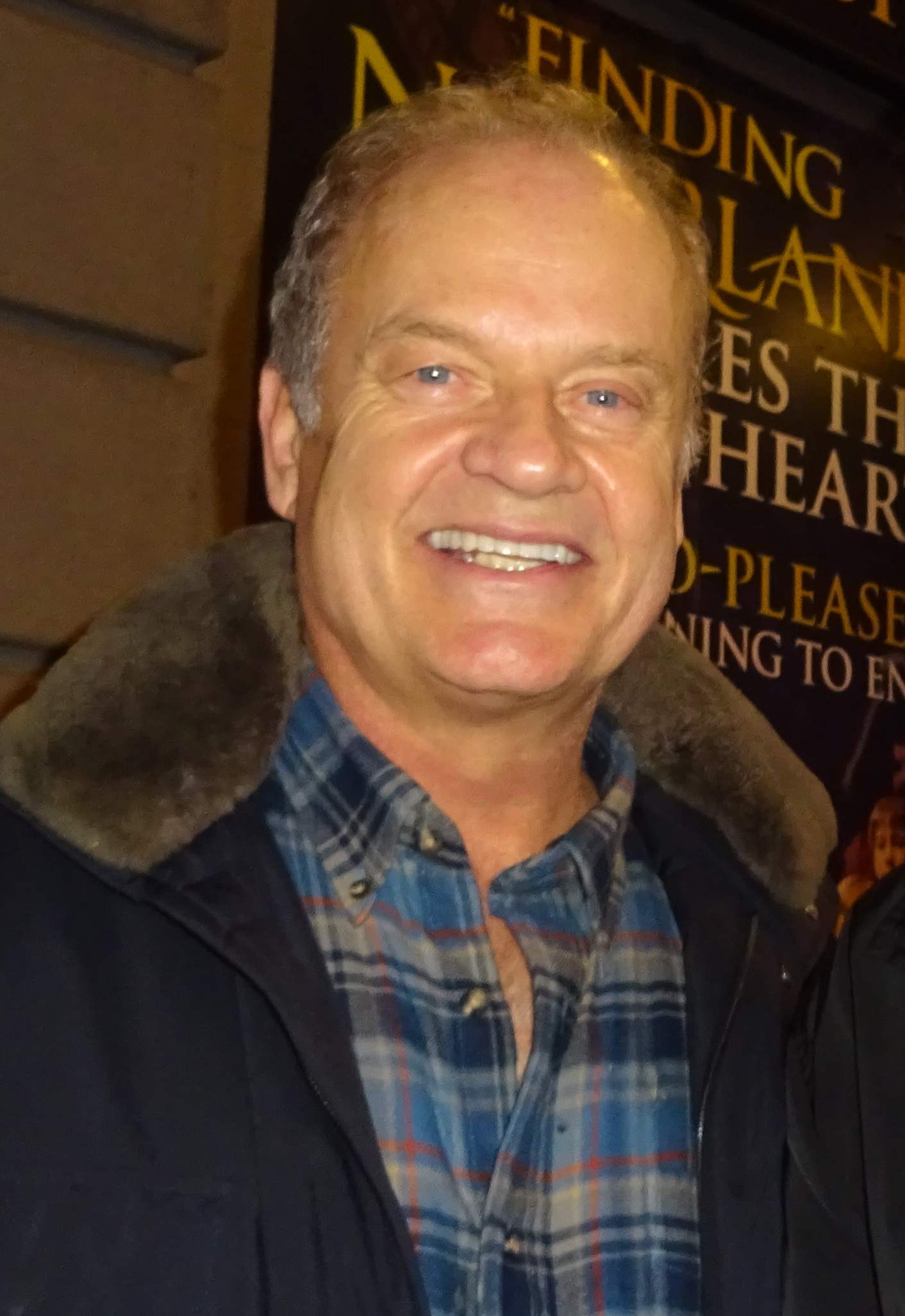
Kelsey Grammer, Worst Supporting Actor winner

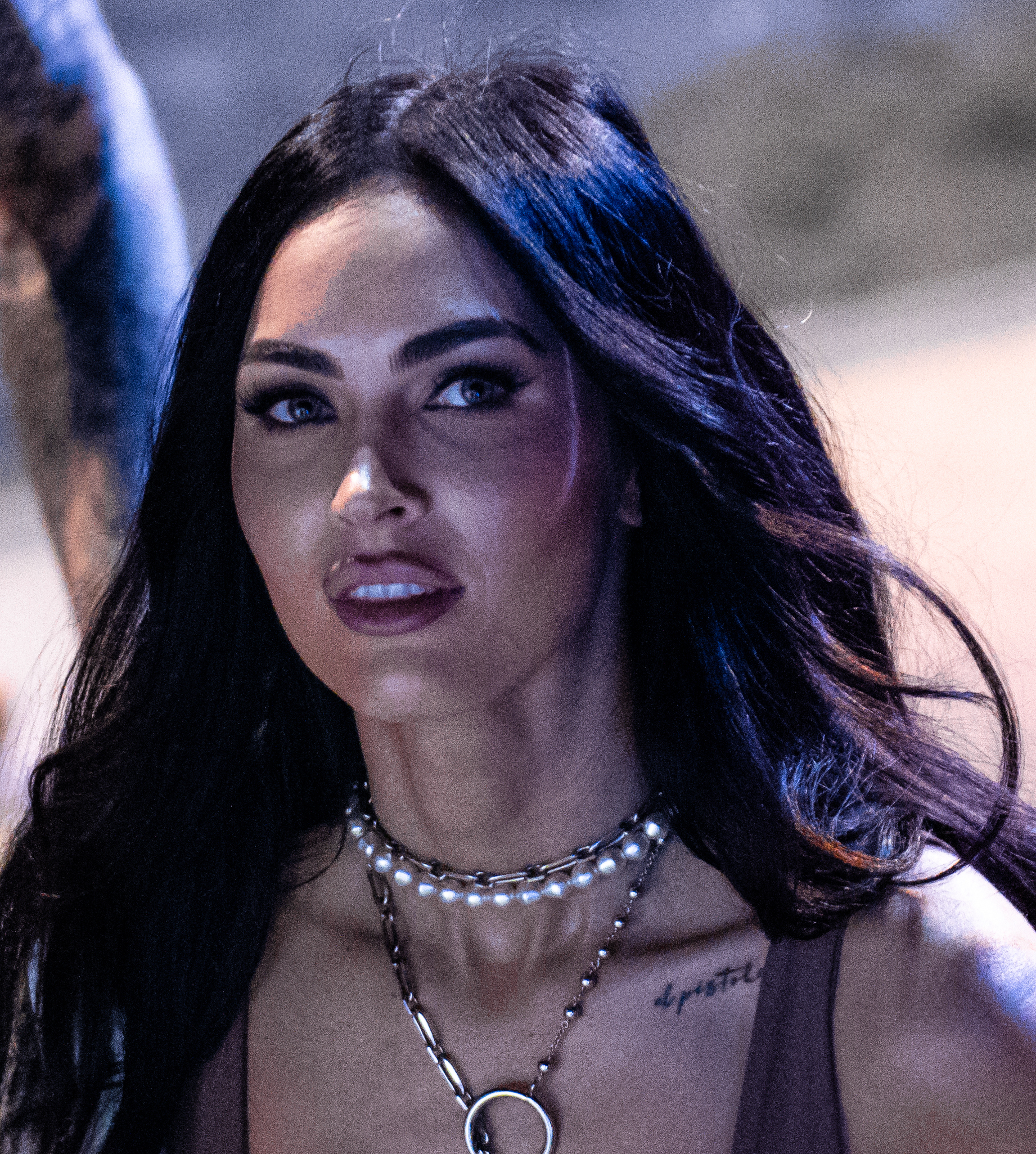
Megan Fox, Worst Supporting Actress winner

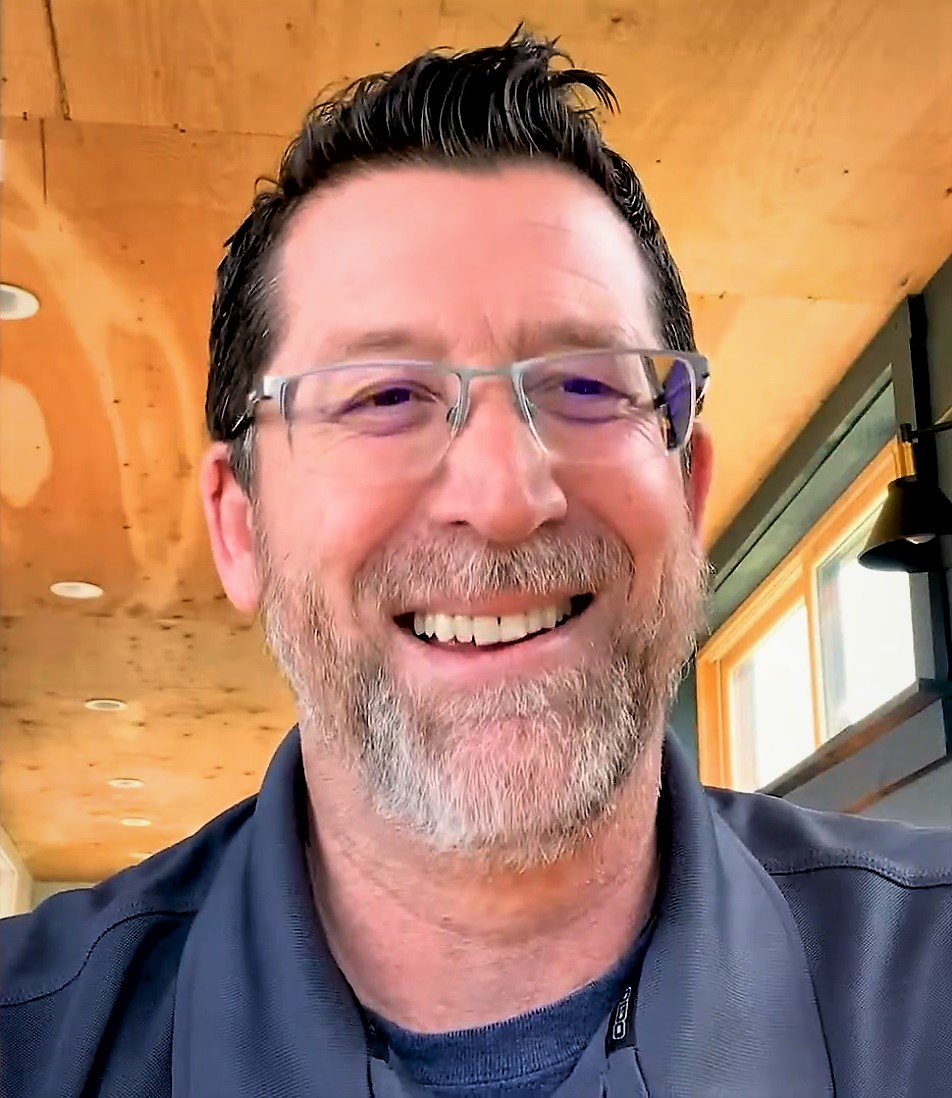
Darren Doane, Worst Screenplay co-winner

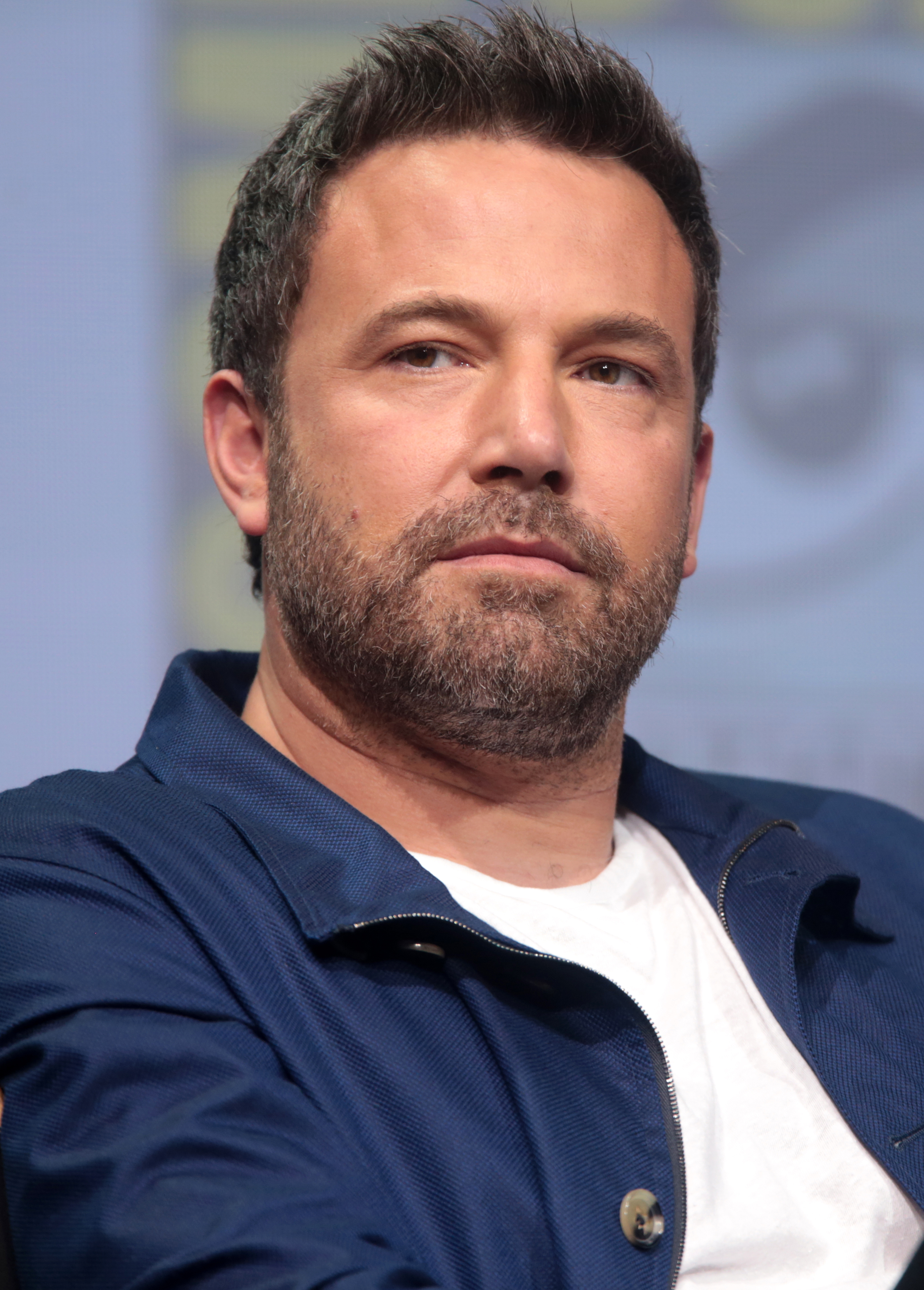
Ben Affleck, Razzie Redeemer Award winner

Worst Picture: Saving Christmas (Samuel Goldwyn); Left Behind (Freestyle Releasing); The Legend of Hercules (Summit Entertainment); Teenage Mutant Ninja Turtles (Paramount/Nickelodeon); Transformers: Age of Extinction (Paramount)	Worst Director: Michael Bay for Transformers: Age of Extinction; Darren Doane for Saving Christmas; Renny Harlin for The Legend of Hercules; Jonathan Liebesman for Teenage Mutant Ninja Turtles; Seth MacFarlane for A Million Ways to Die in the West
Worst Actor: Kirk Cameron in Saving Christmas as Kirk/Himself; Nicolas Cage in Left Behind as Rayford Steele; Kellan Lutz in The Legend of Hercules as Hercules/Alcides; Seth MacFarlane in A Million Ways to Die in the West as Albert Stark; Adam Sandler in Blended as Jim Friedman	Worst Actress: Cameron Diaz in The Other Woman and Sex Tape as Carly Whitten and Annie Hargrove (respectively); Drew Barrymore in Blended as Lauren Reynolds; Melissa McCarthy in Tammy as Tammy Banks; Charlize Theron in A Million Ways to Die in the West as Anna Barnes-Leatherwood; Gaia Weiss in The Legend of Hercules as Hebe
Worst Supporting Actor: Kelsey Grammer in The Expendables 3, Legends of Oz: Dorothy's Return (voice only), Think Like a Man Too, and Transformers: Age of Extinction as Bonaparte, Tin Man, Lee Fox, and Harold Attinger (respectively); Mel Gibson in The Expendables 3 as Conrad Stonebanks/Victor Menz; Shaquille O'Neal in Blended as Doug; Arnold Schwarzenegger in The Expendables 3 as Trench Mauser; Kiefer Sutherland in Pompeii as Senator Quintas Attius Corvus	Worst Supporting Actress: Megan Fox in Teenage Mutant Ninja Turtles as April O'Neil; Cameron Diaz in Annie as Colleen Hannigan; Nicola Peltz in Transformers: Age of Extinction as Tessa Yeager; Bridgette Ridenour in Saving Christmas as Kirk's sister; Susan Sarandon in Tammy as Pearl Balzen
Worst Screen Combo: Kirk Cameron and his ego in Saving Christmas; Any two robots, actors (or robotic actors) in Transformers: Age of Extinction; Cameron Diaz and Jason Segel in Sex Tape; Kellan Lutz and either his abs, his pecs or his glutes in The Legend of Hercules; Seth MacFarlane and Charlize Theron in A Million Ways to Die in the West	Worst Remake, Rip-off or Sequel: Annie (Columbia); Atlas Shrugged Part III: Who Is John Galt? (Atlas Distribution Company); The Legend of Hercules (Summit Entertainment); Teenage Mutant Ninja Turtles (Paramount/Nickelodeon); Transformers: Age of Extinction (Paramount)
Worst Screenplay: Saving Christmas (written by Darren Doane and Cheston Hervey); Left Behind (screenplay by Paul LaLonde and John Patus, based on the novel by Tim LaHaye and Jerry B. Jenkins); Sex Tape (screenplay by Kate Angelo, Jason Segel, & Nicholas Stoller, story by Angelo); Teenage Mutant Ninja Turtles (screenplay by Josh Appelbaum, André Nemec, & Evan Daugherty, based on the characters created by Peter Laird and Kevin Eastman); Transformers: Age of Extinction (screenplay by Ehren Kruger, based on Hasbro's Transformers toys)	Razzie Redeemer Award: Ben Affleck (From RAZZIE “Winner” for Gigli to Oscar Darling for Argo and Gone Girl); Jennifer Aniston (From 4-Time RAZZIE Nominee to Golden Globe, SAG and Critics Choice Award Nominee for Cake); Mike Myers (From RAZZIE “Winner” for The Love Guru to Documentary Director of Supermensch: The Legend of Shep Gordon); Keanu Reeves (From 6-Time RAZZIE Nominee to Critical Hit John Wick); Kristen Stewart (From RAZZIE “Winner” for Twilight to the Art House Hit Camp X-Ray)

== Films with multiple nominations ==
The following eleven films received multiple nominations:

Nominations	Film
7	Transformers: Age of Extinction
6	The Legend of Hercules
6	Saving Christmas
5	Teenage Mutant Ninja Turtles
4	A Million Ways to Die in the West
3	Blended
3	The Expendables 3
3	Left Behind
3	Sex Tape
2	Annie
2	Tammy

== Films with multiple wins ==
The following two films received multiple awards:

Wins	Film
4	Saving Christmas
2	Transformers: Age of Extinction
