= Guji =

Guji may refer to:

- Guji Oromo, an Ethiopian ethnic group, a subgroup of the Oromo people
- Guji Zone, in the Oromia Region, Ethiopia
- Guji Lorenzana (born 1980), Filipino model, actor, and radio DJ
- Gūji, a Japanese term for the chief priest of a Shinto shrine
- Guji Guji, a picture book by Chih-Yuan Chen
