= I Lived on Parker Avenue =

2018 documentary film

- Directed by: Philip Braun
- Produced by: Benjamin Clapper
- Production company: Joie de Vivre Media
- Release date: March 8, 2018
- Running time: 30 minutes
- Budget: $67,000

I Lived on Parker Avenue is a 2018 documentary film. It follows adoptee David Scotton as he travels from his home in Metairie, Louisiana, to Indiana to meet his birth parents — Melissa Coles and Brian Nicholas — for the first time. Scotton gave a speech in 2011 at his high school about his adoption story, which caught the attention of Benjamin Clapper, executive director of the anti-abortion group Louisiana Right to Life, who would go on to produce the documentary. I Lived on Parker Avenue inspired the 2022 feature-length drama film Lifemark.

== Plot ==
In December 2012, 19-year-old David Scotton travels from his home in New Orleans, Louisiana, to Indiana to meet his biological parents, who placed him for adoption at birth. Melissa Coles, Scotton's biological mother, asks Scotton upon meeting him, "Are you mad at me?" Scotton replies, "Never." He then presents Coles and his biological father, Brian Nicholas, with a packet of letters from his friends and family, thanking Coles and Nicholas for choosing to place Scotton for adoption. Nicholas comments that Scotton's gratitude for his adoption is a "load lifted off my shoulders." The film also shows Scotton giving letters to his adopted family, thanking them for adopting him and assuring them that his search for his biological parents is not meant to undermine his adoptive parents' role in his life.

During the meeting, Scotton learns that Coles and Nicholas were unmarried, unemployed, and frequently missed meals when Coles became pregnant. Not wanting to bring a child into their hardship, Coles visited an abortion clinic in Indianapolis, Indiana, to terminate her pregnancy before changing her mind at the last minute. The clinic was located on Parker Avenue, which is from where the documentary takes its name. Instead, she gave birth to her son on December 22, 1993, and he was adopted the following day by Jimmy and Susan Scotton of Metairie, Louisiana. Writing for the National Review, Kathryn Jean Lopez says that the scene where Coles and Scotton visit the location of the clinic — which no longer performs abortions — was "one of the most liberating scenes I’ve ever watched on video".

== Production ==
In 2011, Scotton told his adoption story for the first time publicly during a speech for the Louisiana Pro-Life Oratory Contest at his high school, Jesuit High School in New Orleans. Scotton won the contest with his speech, which brought his story to the attention of Benjamin Clapper, executive director of the anti-abortion group Louisiana Right to Life. Upon learning that Scotton had been in contact with his biological mother, Melissa Coles, via Facebook and was planning to meet with her, Clapper asked permission to film the meeting. Clapper planned to use the footage for a post on his organization's web site. After speaking with Coles, director Philip Braun convinced Clapper that the video should be a short film instead. Clapper created a new production company, Joie de Vivre Media, to produce the film, because he did not want to bias viewers by producing it under the auspices of Louisiana Right to Life.

== Release ==
Pre-release screenings of the film were held at high schools in Louisiana, Mississippi, and Alabama, including Scotton's alma mater. The film was selected for screening at the December 2, 2017, Newfilmmakers Los Angeles' DocuShare Film Festival and was nominated for Best Documentary – Short Category. At the invitation of Governor John Bel Edwards, the film premiered at the Louisiana Governor's Mansion on March 6, 2018, ahead of its release for free online viewing on the documentary's web site the next day.

== Feature-length movie ==
I Lived on Parker Avenue inspired production of a feature-length movie, Lifemark, executive produced by brothers Alex and Stephen Kendrick and distributed by Fathom Events. Kirk Cameron plays the adoptive father (based on Jimmy Scotton) in the film; Melissa Coles, David Scotton, and Susan Scotton all make cameo appearances.
