= A Little Piece of Heaven (film) =

NBC made-for-television family drama

- Genre: Crime; Drama; Family
- Written by: Betty Goldberg
- Directed by: Mimi Leder
- Starring: Kirk Cameron; Cloris Leachman; Jenny Robertson; Ron McLarty; Chelsea Noble; Jussie Smollett; Lacey Chabert
- Composer: Don Davis
- Country of origin: United States
- Original language: English

Production
- Executive producers: Joan Baernett; Jack Grossbart
- Producer: John Danylkiw
- Production location: Toronto
- Cinematography: François Protat
- Editor: Jacque Elaine Toberen
- Running time: 110 minutes
- Production companies: Grossbart Barnett Productions; Spectacor Films

Original release
- Network: NBC
- Release: December 2, 1991

A Little Piece of Heaven is a 1991 American made-for-television family drama film directed by Mimi Leder, written by Betty Goldberg, starring Kirk Cameron, Chelsea Noble, Lacey Chabert, Jenny Robertson, Ron McLarty, Jussie Smollett, and Cloris Leachman. It originally premiered on NBC on December 2, 1991.

== Plot ==
Will Loomis is living with his mentally disabled sister Violet after their parents have died. She wants a young child to play with for Christmas, so Will drugs and kidnaps a child from the local orphanage, and later, when his sister says she doesn't like the boy and demands her brother gets her a girl, Will kidnaps a girl from an abusive home.

The children are told they have died and are in heaven. Will and Violet try to make their farm "a little piece of heaven" for the kids, while the authorities wonder what has happened to the missing children.

After the police locate the children, Will is arrested. During a hearing, both children defend Will's actions. A judge orders Will to open their farm to other disadvantaged children which the court will assign to their care.

== Cast ==
- Kirk Cameron as William "Will" Loomis
- Cloris Leachman as Edwina "Ed" McKevin
- Jenny Robertson as Violet Loomis
- Ron McLarty as Agent Mr. Jack Daniels
- Chelsea Noble as Carrie Lee, the neighbor
- Jussie Smollett as Salem Bordeaux
- Lacey Chabert as Princess, a.k.a. "Hazal"
- Bernard Behrens as Cecil Loomis (Will's Father)
- Colin Fox as The Preacher
- Joyce Campion as Pearl
- Kay Hawtrey as Della
- Nicky Guadagni as Helen Olander
- J. Winston Carroll as Sheriff Dickson
- Amos Crawley as Gregory
- Ron Hartmann as Judge

== Awards ==
Emmy Awards

- 1992, Outstanding Individual Achievement in Music Composition for a Miniseries or a Special (Nominated)

Young Artist Awards

- 1993, Best Young Actress Under Ten in a Television Movie, Lacey Chabert (Nominated)
