= Chelsea Noble Cameron =

American actress (born 1964)

- Born: Nancy Mueller; December 4, 1964 (age 61); Cheektowaga, New York, U.S.
- Other names: Chelsea Cameron; Chelsea Noble
- Occupation: Actress
- Years active: 1988–present
- Known for: Growing Pains; Left Behind: The Movie
- Spouse: Kirk Cameron (m. 1991)
- Children: 6
- Relatives: Candace Cameron Bure (sister-in-law)

Chelsea Cameron (née Noble; born Nancy Mueller; December 4, 1964) is an American actress known for her role as Kate McDonnell on the ABC television sitcom Growing Pains (1989–1992).

Noble is married to her former Growing Pains co-star, Kirk Cameron.

== Career ==
In 1988, Noble made her acting debut, appearing on Full House where she met and started dating series star, John Stamos. She also appeared on several episodes of Days of Our Lives. She co-starred on Growing Pains as Kate McDonnell and Kirk as Elizabeth Waters with Kirk Cameron.

She appears in the 1997 Seinfeld episode "The English Patient". She co-starred as Hattie Durham in the Left Behind trilogies with Cameron. Before those trilogies, Noble and Kirk Cameron co-starred in A Little Piece of Heaven with Cloris Leachman.

Noble has had several uncredited cameos in films starring Kirk Cameron as a "kissing double". Cameron refused to kiss any woman who was not his wife, so for romantic scenes, the actress playing his love interest was replaced by Noble in an appropriate costume and filmed from a distance or behind. This can be seen in the fire station scene in the 2008 movie, Fireproof.

In 2014, she co-starred with her husband in the independent movie Mercy Rule, playing a married couple with two children. Although not the first movie in which they have played husband and wife (having done so in Growing Pains), this is the first time she was credited as Chelsea Cameron.

== Personal life ==
Noble met Kirk Cameron on the set of the TV series Full House when he was visiting his sister Candace, who was one of the stars of the series. Noble and Kirk later co-starred on Growing Pains together. The couple married on July 21, 1991, at Our Lady Help of Christians Chapel in Cheektowaga, New York, and have six children — four adopted and two biological. The Camerons are both devout evangelical Christians. They founded The Firefly Foundation, which runs Camp Firefly.

== Filmography ==
=== Television ===
Year	Title	Role	Notes
1988	Full House	Samantha	Episodes: "The Seven-Month Itch" (Parts 1 & 2)
1988	Days of Our Lives	Kristina Andropolous	9 episodes: 1988, 2016
1988–1989	Who's the Boss?	Cynthia	Episodes: "My Fair Tony" & "Teacher's Pet"
1989	Cheers	Laurie Marlowe	Episode: "Send in the Crane"
1989	Booker	Taryn McKay	Episode: "Bête Noir"
1989–1992	Growing Pains	Kate MacDonald	14 episodes
1991	A Little Piece of Heaven	Carrie Lee	Television movie
1993	Doogie Howser, M.D.	Rachel	Episode: "You've Come a Long Way, Babysitter"
1994	Star Struck	Robyn Call	Television movie
1995–1996	Kirk	Elizabeth Waters	31 episodes
1997	Seinfeld	Danielle	Episode: "The English Patient"
1998	You Lucky Dog	Alison Taylor	Television movie
2000	The Growing Pains Movie	Kate MacDonald Seaver	Television movie
2004	Growing Pains: Return of the Seavers	Kate MacDonald Seaver	Television movie

=== Film ===
Year	Title	Role	Notes
1990	Instant Karma	Penelope	—
1990	The Willies	Anchor Woman	—
2000	Left Behind: The Movie	Hattie Durham	—
2002	Left Behind II: Tribulation Force	Hattie Durham	—
2005	Left Behind: World at War	Hattie Durham	—
2008	Fireproof	Catherine Holt	Uncredited
2014	Mercy Rule	Maddie Miller	Direct to video; credited as Chelsea Cameron
