= Marty Ingels =

American actor (1936–2015)

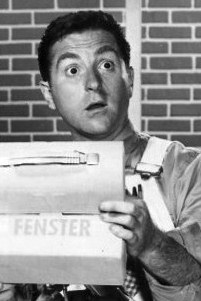
- Ingels in I'm Dickens, He's Fenster (1962)
- Born: Martin Ingerman; March 9, 1936; New York City, U.S.
- Died: October 21, 2015 (aged 79); Tarzana, Los Angeles, California, U.S.
- Occupations: Actor; comedian; comedy sketch writer; theatrical agent
- Years active: 1958–2015
- Spouses: Jean Marie Frassinelli (m. 1960; div. 1969) Shirley Jones (m. 1977)
- Relatives: Abraham Beame (uncle by marriage)

Martin Ingerman (March 9, 1936 – October 21, 2015), known professionally as Marty Ingels, was an American actor, comedian, comedy sketch writer, and theatrical agent, who is best known as the co-star of the 1960s television series I'm Dickens, He's Fenster.

== Early life ==
Ingels was born as Martin Ingerman to a Jewish family in 1936 in Brooklyn, New York City, the son of Jacob and Minnie (née Crown) Ingerman. His uncle was Abraham Beame, the mayor of New York City from 1974 to 1977.

Ingels joined the Army where a talent scout spotted him for the televised quiz show Name That Tune. He won several thousand dollars and became known for his humorous repartee. He used his winnings to study at the Pasadena Playhouse.

== Career ==
Ingels' acting career dates back to the early 1960s. He co-starred in the ABC sitcom, I'm Dickens, He's Fenster (1962–63) with John Astin, which lasted one season of thirty-two episodes.

Ingels guest-starred on the CBS sitcoms Pete and Gladys, The Ann Sothern Show, Hennesey, and appeared twice as Sol Pomeroy, an army buddy of the character Rob Petrie, on The Dick Van Dyke Show. He also appeared in one episode of ABC's Bewitched as "Diaper Dan", who plants a microphone bug in Tabitha's rattle so a competing advertising agency can scoop and steal Darrin's ideas. In 1978, Ingels guest starred in Season Two, episode One of The Love Boat.

His voice-overs and commercials include those for Paul Masson wines. He played Autocat in the Motormouse and Autocat cartoons featured first on The Cattanooga Cats and then in a series of their own, and was Beegle Beagle in The Great Grape Ape Show. He was also the voice of the title character in the animated series adaptation of the 1980 video game Pac-Man. In 2010, Ingels was cast in an episode of CBS's CSI: Crime Scene Investigation.

He also acted in films, including Armored Command (1961), The Horizontal Lieutenant (1962), Wild and Wonderful (1964), The Busy Body (1967), A Guide for the Married Man (1967), For Singles Only (1968), The Picasso Summer (1969), If It's Tuesday, This Must Be Belgium (1969), Linda Lovelace for President (1975), and Instant Karma (1990).

Beginning in the 1970s, Ingels worked primarily as an agent, specializing in representing actors in celebrity endorsement ads.

== Personal life ==
Ingels was married twice: first to Jean Marie Frassinelli in 1960; they divorced in 1969 after nine years of marriage. On November 13, 1977, he married singer/actress Shirley Jones. Despite some drastically different personalities, and several separations (Shirley filed, then withdrew, a divorce petition in 2002), the couple remained married until his death in 2015.

=== Lawsuits ===
Ingels was also known for frequent legal actions, so much that in his The New York Times obituary Margalit Fox wrote: "[Ingels] always seemed to be suing someone, and someone always seemed to be suing him".

In 1993, Ingels sued actress June Allyson for his talent agency commission. Allyson had appeared in commercials for Depend undergarments; Ingels alleged that he was not paid his proper commission as her agent. Allyson denied this and countersued. Ingels pleaded no contest to making harassing phone calls to Allyson.

In 2003, he sued radio personality Tom Leykis and Westwood One, saying that comments made about him constituted age discrimination. Ingels had called into Leykis's radio program objecting to the content, and Leykis declared on the air that Ingels was "not just older than my demographic, you're the grandfather of my demographic." In June 2005, Ingels's lawsuit was dismissed and Ingels was ordered to pay Leykis's $25,000 in legal fees.

== Death ==
Ingels died from a massive stroke at Tarzana Medical Center in Tarzana, California on October 21, 2015, at the age of 79. After Ingels's death, Jones stated "He often drove me crazy, but there's not a day I won't miss him and love him to my core."

== Filmography ==
=== Film ===
Year	Title	Role	Notes
1961	The Ladies Man	Marty Ingels	
1961	Armored Command	Pinhead	
1962	The Horizontal Lieutenant	Yeoman Leo Buckles	
1964	Wild and Wonderful	Doc Bailey	
1967	The Busy Body	Willie	
1967	A Guide for the Married Man	Technical Adviser (Meat Eater)	
1968	For Singles Only	Archibald Baldwin	
1969	If It's Tuesday, This Must Be Belgium	Bert Greenfield	
1969	The Picasso Summer	Man at Party	
1974	How to Seduce a Woman	Jim	
1975	Linda Lovelace for President	Ronald Trixie	
1990	Instant Karma	Jon Clark	
1992	The Opposite Sex and How to Live with Them		Uncredited
1992	Round Numbers	Al Schweitzer	
1998	The Jungle Book: Mowgli's Story	Hathi (voice)	
1999	Kartenspieler	Max	
2003	Down the Barrel	Richard Chainey	
2007	Chasing Robert	Porn Shop Manager	
2008	Parasomnia	Mr. Boudreau	Uncredited
2008	Wednesday Again	Xander	
2013	A Strange Brand of Happy	Mack	
2015	Promoted	Murray Silver	
2021	Bruce the Challenge	Gramps	Final role Posthumous release

=== Television ===
Year	Title	Role	Notes
1958	The Phil Silvers Show	Navy Cook	Episode: "Bilko Joins the Navy"
1960	Peter Loves Mary	Joey Vaughn	Episode: "Peter Joins a Committee"
1960	Dan Raven	Benny	2 episodes
1960–1962	Hennesey	Patient, Waiter	4 episodes
1961	Manhunt		Episode: "The Death Trap"
1961	The Ann Sothern Show	Erskine Wild	Episode: "Always April"
1961	The Aquanauts	Waiter	Episode: "The Tidal Wave Adventure"
1961	The Law and Mr. Jones	Tony	Episode: "The Broken Hand"
1961	The Detectives	Lazarus	Episode: "Tobey's Place
1961	Pete and Gladys	Man	Episode: "Eyewitness"
1961	Follow the Sun	Georgie	Episode: "The Girl from the Brandenburg Gate"
1961–1962	The Dick Van Dyke Show	Sol Pomeroy	2 episodes
1962	The Joey Bishop Show	Freddy	Episode: "Once a Bachelor"
1962–1963	I'm Dickens, He's Fenster	Arch Fenster	32 episodes
1964	Duncan Be Careful		TV movie
1964	Burke's Law	Wally	Episode: "Who Killed Madison Cooper?"
1966	The Addams Family	Dr. Marvin P. Gunderson	Episode: "Cat Addams"
1966	Bewitched	Dan	Episode: "Dangerous Diaper Dan"
1967	The Phyllis Diller Show	Norman Krump	7 episodes
1967	Good Morning World	Jimmy	Episode: "Knits to You, Sir"
1968	Kiss Me Kate	Gangster	Television film
1969	Motormouse and Autocat	Autocat (voice)	TV series
1969–1971	Cattanooga Cats	Autocat (voice)	TV series
1971	The Partners	Eddie Polaski	1 episode
1972	Banacek	Marty Ingels	Episode: "Let's Hear It for a Living Legend"
1973	The Rookies	Master of Ceremonies	Episode: "Down Home Boy"
1973–1974	Adam-12	Siphoner, David Harwood	2 episodes
1975	The Great Grape Ape Show	Beegle Beagle (voice)	TV series
1975	The New Tom & Jerry Show	Beegle Beagle (voice)	TV series
1975	The Ghost Busters	Billy the Kid	Episode: "They Went Thataway"
1975–1976	Police Story	Howie, Marty Abbott	2 episodes
1977	Chips	Sidney	Episode: "Hustle"
1978	The Love Boat	Joe Nash	Episode: "The Man Who Loved Women/A Different Girl/Oh, My Aching Brother"
1979	Family	Gip Goddard	Episode: "Going Straight"
1982	Christmas Comes to Pac-Land	Pac-Man (voice)	TV special
1982–1983	Pac-Man	Pac-Man (voice)	42 episodes including 2 specials
1990	The Munsters Today	Ivan	Episode: "Never Say Die"
1990–1991	Murder, She Wrote	Joe Gelardi, Seymour Densch	2 episodes
1991	The New Adam-12	Mr. Edwards	Episode: "Crack House
1991	What a Dummy	Leonard	Episode: "The Vacation That Never Was"
1991–1992	Darkwing Duck	The Devil (voice)	2 episodes
1995	Burke's Law	Christoph Kohl	Episode: "Who Killed the World's Greatest Chef?"
1995	Deadly Games	Hank	Episode: "One Mean Mother"
1997	Baywatch	Prospector	Episode: "Eel Nino"
1998	Walker, Texas Ranger	Murray	Episode: "Crusader"
2006	Z-Squad	Butler (voice)	Episode: "Pilot"
2006	ER	Mr. Gallagher	Episode: "Heart of the Matter"
2010	CSI: Crime Scene Investigation	Marty Felnick	Episode: "Meat Jekyll"
2013	New Girl	Pickled Patron	Episode: "The Box"
2014	Burt Paxton: Private Detective	Grandpa	TV series short
2015	The Middle Ages	Pop-pop, Richard, Willy	3 episodes Final television role

=== Video games ===
Year	Title	Role
1997	Zork: Grand Inquisitor	Griff
