= Crocoduck =

Fictional hybrid animal

Kirk Cameron holds up a composite picture, and cites the absence of a "crocoduck" as evidence against evolution, during a debate on the existence of God at Calvary Baptist Church in Manhattan in 2007.

The crocoduck is a fictional hybrid animal with the head of a crocodile and the body of a duck. It was proposed in 2007 by young-Earth creationists Ray Comfort and Kirk Cameron to be an animal that should exist, were their misconceptions about the theory of evolution true. The animal became an internet meme used to ridicule common misrepresentations of evolution, namely, that the theory predicts forms intermediate between any two currently living organisms.

== In creationism ==
In 2007, young-Earth creationists Kirk Cameron and Ray Comfort participated in a televised debate, parts of which were aired on ABC Nightline, on the existence of God. Kirk Cameron held up composite pictures of what "we imagined would be genuine species-to-species transitional forms", including the "crocoduck", the "bullfrog", and the "sheepdog". The "crocoduck" was an animal with the head of a crocodile and the body of a duck, the "bullfrog" was an animal with the head of a bull and the body of a frog, and the "sheepdog" was an animal with the head of a dog and the body of a sheep. These pictures were used as a straw man argument to ridicule the theory of evolution as represented by Cameron and Comfort.

This claim was widely publicized and ridiculed as an example of creationist misconceptions. In The Greatest Show on Earth: The Evidence for Evolution, the evolutionary scientist Richard Dawkins included a section titled 'Show me your crocoduck!' in which he compared this to the question put by another creationist as to why there was no transitional fossil "fronkey" between frogs and monkeys, and described it as a warped misunderstanding of evolution. Modern species share a common ancestor, but are neither descended from each other nor from some crude composite chimera, and ducks are not descended from crocodiles. An illustration shows the Crocoduck Tie, designed by web designer Josh Timonen in commemoration of this misconception. Dawkins has stated that "There are only two in existence. PZ Myers has one. I'm proud to say I have the other." Dawkins' tie made a prominent appearance on an episode of The Colbert Report.

== Fossils ==
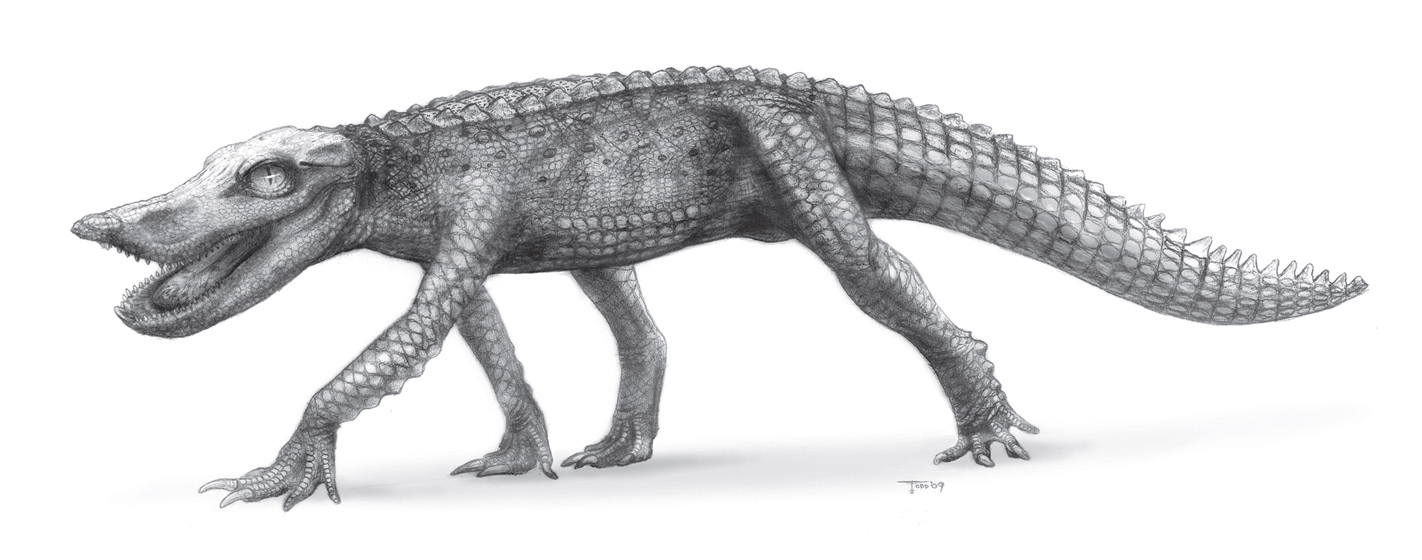
Reconstruction of Anatosuchus showing its broad snout (with teeth) and upright walking posture

In 2003, new fossils of several types of ancient crocodile were found, including one with a flat broad snout reminiscent of a duck's bill, though it has teeth and is obviously crocodilian rather than bird-like. This genus has been named Anatosuchus or "DuckCroc", and it had an upright stance rather than the sprawled legs of modern crocodiles. Pelagornithid seabirds have serrated beaks that resemble teeth and have been recovered as fowl. In 2014, Paleontologist Paul Sereno described the semi-aquatic reconstruction of Spinosaurus as a "half duck, half crocodile". In addition, the feathered dinosaurs Halszkaraptor and Natovenator show adaptations for swimming and diving similar to modern waterbirds.

The most recent common ancestor of duck and crocodiles is the base of the Archosauria clade, and was probably superficially similar to modern crocodiles. No fossil of this common ancestor are known to exist, but groups such as Phytosauria and Proterochampsia are near to the base of the archosaur clade. Although the phylogenetic distance from these groups to ducks and crocodiles are equal, in form and likely behaviour they are more similar to crocodiles. For Phytosauria at least, it was due to parallel evolution, with phytosaurs and crocodilians adapting to similar semi-aquatic predator niches.

== In literature ==
The author and illustrator Chih-Yuan Chen from Taiwan produced the bestselling children's story Guji Guji in 2004, a modern-day twist on The Ugly Duckling, in which a crocodile egg rolls into a duck's nest and is raised in a brood of ducklings, growing up as a "crocoduck" who thinks he is "not a bad crocodile", but "not exactly a duck either."

== See also ==
- Rejection of evolution by religious groups
- Intelligent design
- Kitzmiller v. Dover Area School District
- Reductio ad absurdum
- Feathered dinosaur
- Hybrid beasts in folklore
