= Christmas Comes to Pac-Land =

1982 American animated TV special

- 1988 VHS cover featuring the Pac-Family with Santa Claus
- Genre: Adventure; Comedy
- Based on: Pac-Man created by Toru Iwatani and video game by Namco Ltd.
- Story by: Jeffrey Scott
- Directed by: Ray Patterson
- Voices of: Marty Ingels; Barbara Minkus; Russi Taylor; Peter Cullen; Frank Welker; Neil Ross; Barry Gordon; Chuck McCann; Susan Silo
- Composer: Hoyt Curtin
- Country of origin: United States
- Original language: English

Production
- Executive producers: William Hanna; Joseph Barbera
- Producer: Kay Wright
- Production company: Hanna-Barbera Productions

Original release
- Network: ABC
- Release: December 16, 1982

Related
- Pac-Man (TV series)

Christmas Comes to Pac-Land is a 1982 American animated Christmas television special of the Saturday morning animated series Pac-Man based on the video game, produced by Hanna-Barbera. It premiered in prime time on ABC on December 16, 1982. The film was ranked #38 in the Nielsen Ratings published the next week.

== Plot ==
During Christmas Eve, Pac-Man, along with his family are having fun in the snow, but end up having to fight off and eat the Ghost Monsters. When they are defeated, the ghosts' eyes come across Santa Claus in his sleigh, scaring his reindeer and making him crash.

Pac-Man and his friends take Santa to his house for shelter, where he explains to them, who are unfamiliar with Christmas, what it is and that he needs to get back to delivering gifts. Pac-Man volunteers to search for Santa's lost toys along with his dog Chomp-Chomp, while his friends rebuild Santa's sleigh.

As they search for the gifts, Pac-Man and Chomp-Chomp find out that the Ghost Monsters have found them. The ghosts then chase and injure Pac-Man, while Chomp-Chomp takes the sack of toys. The two make it back to Pac-Man's house and return the gifts, and the sleigh has been fixed. Santa says it is too late to save Christmas, but Pac-Man gets an idea that might work.

Pac-Man and the gang drive somewhere, but then get cornered by the Ghost Monsters. Pac-Man attempts to reason with them, telling them how cheerful and warm Christmas is, and they, touched by this, let them pass. The group arrive in the Power Pellet Forest, and Santa's reindeer eat the Power Pellets, making them fly again. When Pac-Man and his friends and family arrive back in his house, they realize there is a Christmas tree and presents left inside, and celebrate Christmas along with the Ghost Monsters (who came inside attempting to attack them, only to change their minds when Pac-Man gives them presents).

== Voices ==
- Marty Ingels as Pac-Man
- Barbara Minkus as Mrs. Pepper Pac-Man
- Russi Taylor as Pac-Baby
- Peter Cullen as Sour Puss / Santa Claus
- Frank Welker as Chomp Chomp / Morris Reindeer
- Neil Ross as Clyde
- Barry Gordon as Inky
- Chuck McCann as Blinky / Pinky / Officer O'Pac
- Susan Silo as Sue

== Broadcast ==
Christmas Comes to Pac-Land premiered on ABC on December 16, 1982. ABC rebroadcast the special on December 8, 1983. Cartoon Network would acquire the rights to the special in the 90s and aired the special during the Holiday season beginning in December 1992 with the last broadcast taking place in November 1994. TNT aired the special in November 26, 1994.

== Reception ==
The special received mixed-to-negative reviews from critics. Bill Hayden for The Honolulu Advertiser liked the special. He especially commended the distinct characterization of its voice actors - especially the performances of Marty Ingels and Barbara Minkus. Hayden also felt that the special was fun. In contrast, Tom Long for Santa Cruz Sentinel referred the special as "the ultimate insult to viewer intelligence".

In 2018, Rotten Tomatoes retrospectively placed the special as one of the seven "completely bizarre Christmas specials", criticizing its humor and animation while commending it for being a "Pac-Man Christmas special".
