= Camp Firefly =

Week-long summer camp for terminally ill children and families

- Formation: c.1990; 36 years ago
- Type: 501(c)(3) NGO
- Purpose: Summer camp
- Headquarters: Atlanta, Georgia
- Leader: Kirk Cameron; Chelsea Noble
- Parent organization: The Firefly Foundation
- Website: CampFirefly

Camp Firefly is a week-long summer camp run by the 501(c)(3) nonprofit Firefly Foundation in Atlanta, Georgia, which was founded by married-couple film actors Kirk Cameron and Chelsea Noble. It gives terminally ill and seriously ill children and their families a free week's vacation.

== Purpose ==
Inspired by Cameron's work with sick children when he was a television actor, Camp Firefly began around 1990 and focuses on also helping accompanying family members. Six or seven families attend each year's retreat, and as of 2012, over 100 families had attended, according to an interview with Cameron by Indiana Wesleyan University. During the camp, activities include engagements such as Lūʻaus, barn dancing, outdoor activities, golfing, a spa day, water sports, horseback riding, pool activities, go-carting, miniature golf, attending a petting zoo, circus activities, and safaris. The camp is staffed by those with counseling experience.

The camp's purpose is presented, as follows:

This all expenses paid, fun-filled, week-long retreat gives struggling families time to get away from the everyday pressure of hospitals, medical treatments, and financial worries to spend quality time with one another, meet other families who understand their challenges, and replenish their supply of faith and friendships.

== Support ==
The camp received a donation from Sherwood Baptist Church, in whose major 2008 film, Fireproof, Cameron had starred without payment. It has received other donations including from the automobile manufacturer Kia.
