= You Lucky Dog =

- Film poster
- Genre: Fantasy; Comedy
- Screenplay by: David Covell; Peter Baloff; Dave Wollert
- Story by: David Covell
- Directed by: Paul Schneider
- Starring: Kirk Cameron; Chelsea Noble; John de Lancie
- Music by: David Michael Frank
- Country of origin: United States
- Original language: English

Production
- Producer: Lori-Etta Taub
- Cinematography: Mark W. Gray
- Editor: Kaja Fehr
- Running time: 89 minutes
- Production company: Finnegan-Pinchuk
- Budget: $4 million

Original release
- Network: Disney Channel
- Release: June 27, 1998

You Lucky Dog is a 1998 American television fantasy comedy film directed by Paul Schneider and starring Kirk Cameron. It first aired as a Disney Channel Original Movie on June 27, 1998.

== Plot ==
Jack Morgan is a dog therapist, once famous for being able to read his dog's mind. Although Jack cannot read the minds of other dogs, he still operates a canine mind-reading business, without divulging his inability to customers. Mr. Mooney and his wife bring their dog to see Jack. Dissatisfied with Jack's inability to read his dog's mind, Mr. Mooney, who is a friend of the city mayor, threatens to have his business closed down. After the Mooneys leave, a wealthy man named Clyde Windsor brings his dog, Lucky, to see Jack, who is stunned by his ability to read the dog's mind. He seems worried by this fact and ends the session early. Before Windsor leaves, Jack informs him that Lucky is bothered by three individuals who live with him.

Two weeks later, the city closes down Jack's business. Simultaneously, Windsor's personal driver, Calvin Bridges, informs Jack that Windsor has died. Windsor's lawyer, Allison Kent, reads Windsor's will to his niece and two nephews: Margaret, Lyle, and Reuben. The will reveals that the three individuals receive next to nothing from the estate of Windsor, who chose Lucky to inherit his money and mansion. Jack meets with Allison and is informed that he is Windsor's chosen trustee for Lucky's $64 million trust fund. Jack agrees to move into the mansion and become Lucky's new owner, as required by the trust fund, thus forcing Lyle, Margaret, and Reuben to move out.

Windsor's relatives meet with Mr. Phister, a greedy lawyer who will only take the case to trial for 30 percent of the money in their uncle's trust fund. Windsor's relatives, who are used to living a luxurious lifestyle, instead plot to regain the mansion and to become the trustees of the trust fund on their own. One night, Jack begins acting like a dog after Lucky becomes overly excited about the dog bones he had buried in the mansion's backyard. Jack joins Lucky in his search for bones, and later tears up furniture with Lucky, scaring away the mansion's two maids with his dog-like behavior. The morning after this incident, Jack explains to Calvin that when Lucky becomes too excited, Lucky takes over Jack´s body and Jack "becomes" Lucky. Later that day, to help Lucky get over the death of his owner, Jack and Calvin take him to a local shopping mall. At the mall's pet store, Jack signs additional paperwork for Allison and also meets her daughter, Nicole, who wants to buy a puppy. However, Allison tells her daughter that their apartment is not suitable for a puppy. In the mall's food court, Lucky becomes excited at the scent of food. Jack's mind once again transforms into that of Lucky’s. Jack and Lucky devour leftover food on tables and inside a trash bin.

After numerous failed attempts, Windsor's relatives agree to Phister's expensive offer to take the case to trial and have Jack declared mentally incompetent. At the courthouse, Jack demonstrates his connection to Lucky by getting him excited and showing that when Lucky controls his body, he can identify objects he cannot see. Jack discovers through Lucky's thoughts that Lyle likely poisoned his uncle. Lyle threatens the courtroom with a gun after Jack accuses him of murdering his uncle. Lucky knocks Lyle over, and he is arrested along with Margaret and Reuben. At the mansion, Jack reveals to Allison and her daughter that he purchased all of the dogs at the mall's pet store at Lucky's request. Among the dogs that will live at the mansion is a puppy for Nicole and a female companion for Lucky.

== Cast ==
- Kirk Cameron as Jack Morgan
- Bogus The Dog as Lucky The Dog
- Chelsea Noble as Allison Kent
- John de Lancie as Lyle Windsor
- Christine Healy as Margaret Windsor
- Granville Van Dusen as Mr. Phister
- Christine Cavanaugh as Bernice
- Hansford Rowe as Clyde Windsor
- Jane Carr as The Maid
- Mary Pat Gleason as The Cook
- Taylor Negron as Reuben Windsor
- James Avery as Calvin Bridges
- Tom McCleister as Mr. Mooney
- Myra Turley as Mrs. Mooney
- Patricia Belcher as Judge Tanner
- Jillian Berard as Nicole Tyler

== Production ==
Filming took place in March 1998, and was scheduled to last 27 days. Kirk Cameron had read the film's script a couple years earlier, and brought it to Disney Channel, which chose to produce it. Filming locations included Canoga Park, a neighborhood of Los Angeles, California. The film's budget was $4 million.

On March 10, 1998, during its sixth day of filming in Canoga Park, approximately 50 crew members halted production when they protested for union membership. Filming resumed after two hours of discussions that resulted in full union status for the crew members. The role of Lucky was portrayed by Bogus, a Saint Bernard-Golden Retriever mix. Cameron's wife, Chelsea Noble, also plays a role in the film. Cameron had to wear elbow pads and knee pads during scenes that required him to run like a dog.

== Reception ==
In May 2016, Aubrey Page of Collider ranked each of the 99 Disney Channel Original Movies released up to that point. Page ranked You Lucky Dog at the bottom of the list, writing, "There's not a clear message here honestly, and though it's only been a few days since I've watched this one, it already only exists in my mind under the file: 'Kirk Cameron Eats a Couch.' So that's something."

== Awards ==
In 1999 the original song "Togetherness" was nominated for a Primetime Emmy for Outstanding Music and Lyrics, David Michael Frank (composer) and Todd Smallwood (lyricist).

== See also ==
- List of Disney Channel original films
- Telepathy
- Familiar
