= Our Lady Help of Christians Chapel (Cheektowaga, New York) =

Historic church in New York, United States

- Chapel of Our Lady Help of Christians
- U.S. National Register of Historic Places
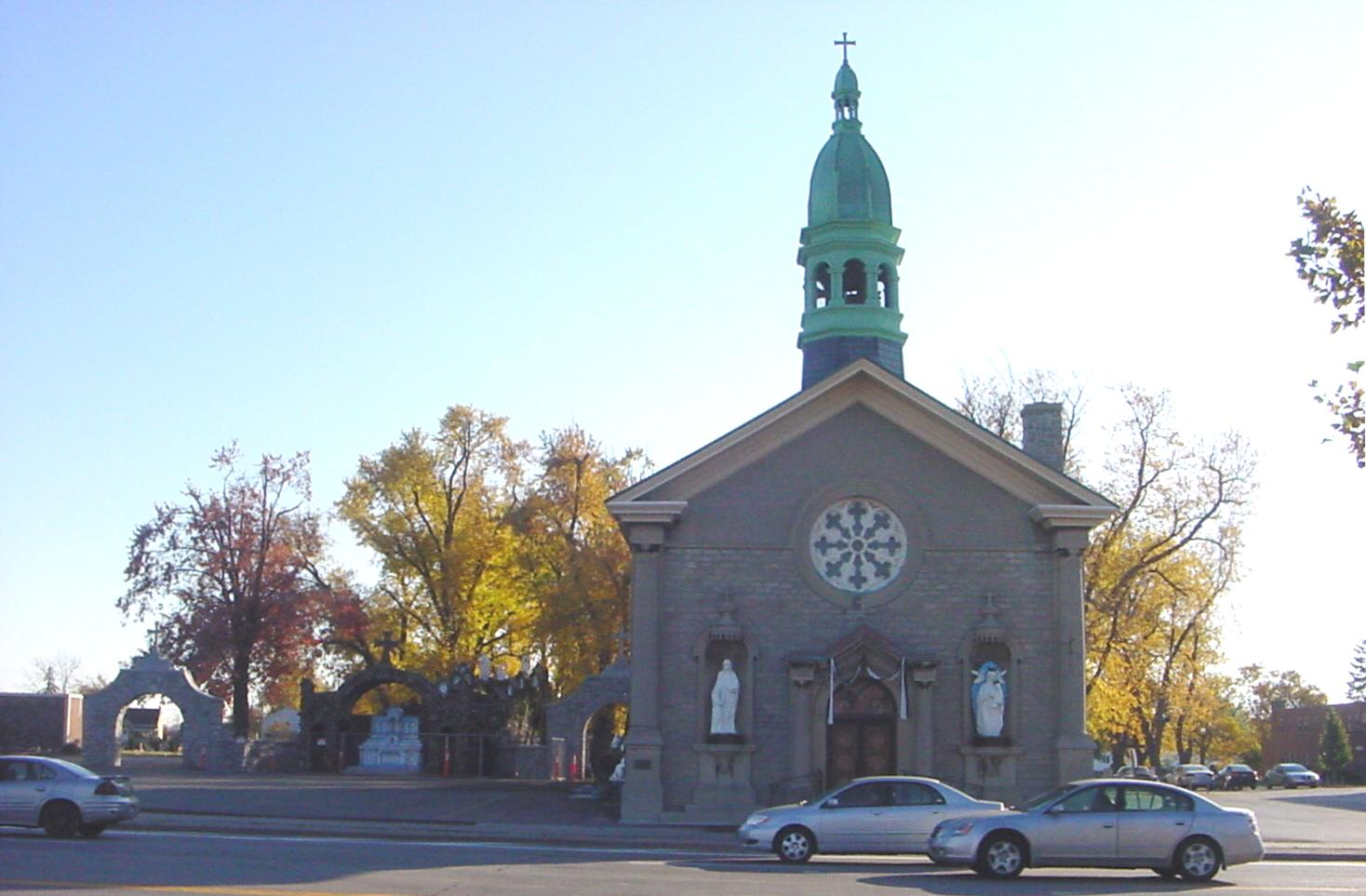

- Location within New York Location within the United States
- Location: 4125 Union Rd., Cheektowaga, New York
- Coordinates: 42°55′34″N 78°45′14″W
- Built: 1853
- Architect: Batt, Joseph; Foit & Baschnagel
- Architectural style: Greek Revival
- NRHP reference No.: 78001851
- Added to NRHP: December 14, 1978

Chapel of Our Lady Help of Christians, also known as the Maria Hilf Chapel, is a historic Roman Catholic church located at Cheektowaga in Erie County, New York. It is part of the Diocese of Buffalo.

== History ==
The Chapel of Our Lady Help of Christians was constructed in 1853, in the Greek Revival style, as a religious center for the rural Alsatian community and pilgrimage site for urban Alsatian, German, Polish, and Italian immigrants to Our Lady Help of Christians. The interior features a barrel vault ceiling, wooden church mobiliary, frescos, paintings, and other features that reflect an Alsatian village church.

Actors Kirk Cameron and Chelsea Noble were married at the church in 1991.
