= Saving Christmas =

2014 film directed by Darren Doane

- Theatrical release poster
- Directed by: Darren Doane
- Written by: Darren Doane; Cheston Hervey
- Produced by: Darren Doane; Raphi Henly; Amanda Rosser; David Shannon
- Starring: Kirk Cameron; Darren Doane; Bridgette Ridenour; David Shannon; Raphi Henley; Ben Kientz
- Cinematography: Andy Patch
- Edited by: Postmill Factory
- Music by: Brian Popkin
- Production companies: Camfam Studios; Liberty University; Provident Films; XDX2
- Distributed by: Samuel Goldwyn Films
- Release date: November 14, 2014
- Running time: 79 minutes
- Country: United States
- Language: English
- Budget: $500,000
- Box office: $2.8 million

Saving Christmas (also known as Kirk Cameron's Saving Christmas) is a 2014 American faith-based Christmas comedy film. It was directed by Darren Doane and written by Doane and Cheston Hervey, based on an original story by Kirk Cameron. The movie stars Cameron as a fictionalized version of himself, as he tries to convince his fictional brother-in-law, played by the film's director, that Christmas is still a Christian holiday.

It was theatrically released by Samuel Goldwyn Films on November 14, 2014. Saving Christmas was universally panned, earning a rare 0% rating on Rotten Tomatoes, becoming the lowest rated film of all time on IMDB within a month of its theatrical release, and being widely considered one of the worst films ever made. The film would win four of its six nominations at the 35th Golden Raspberry Awards, including Worst Picture. Cameron would respond negatively to the film's scathing reception, falsely claiming that the unfavorable reviews were part of an atheist smear campaign on Reddit, and plead with users to improve the film's reception on multiple review sites, which ultimately sparked further criticism.

== Plot ==
In a framing sequence, Kirk Cameron—as himself—addresses the audience from beside a fireplace, explaining his love of Christmas. Cameron goes on to express his views on the contemporary celebration of Christmas, which include his beliefs that atheists have tried to "take the holiday away" and that Santa Claus is a Christian. Cameron also criticizes fundamentalist Christians who have politicized the holiday by tying the celebration to Pagan traditions and making accusations that the holiday has become too tied to materialism.

The film switches to its main narrative, in which Cameron attends a Christmas party at his sister's house. There, he notices that his brother-in-law, Christian, is not celebrating like the other guests. When asked why, Christian tells Cameron that he feels the holiday has become too commercialized and consumerist, and that he feels uncomfortable with what he believes are Pagan elements of contemporary Christmas celebration. Cameron tells Christian that he is wrong and recites the story of the Nativity, which is depicted in cartoon form. Meanwhile, two guests at the party discuss conspiracy theories.

Christian complains that several elements of Christmas, most notably Christmas trees, are not biblical in origin. Cameron tells him that Christmas trees were God's idea since God created trees. He also says that each tree represents a Christian cross; breaking the fourth wall, Cameron encourages the audience to visualize a cross every time they see a Christmas tree. Cameron further addresses several other concerns Christian has about the historicity of the holiday, including its date and the role of the Three Wise Men. Cameron ties the Nativity directly to the crucifixion, saying that baby Jesus' swaddling cloth was a foreshadowing of his burial shroud, and claims that the gifts of frankincense and myrrh were used to treat dead bodies in a form of primitive embalming. Cameron encourages Christian and the audience to place nutcracker dolls around Nativity sets to represent Herod's soldiers during the Massacre of the Innocents.

Christian is convinced by the arguments, but then complains that Santa has replaced Jesus as the figurehead of the holiday; he further expresses discomfort over the fact that "Santa" is an anagram of "Satan". Cameron tells Christian the story of Saint Nicholas, including a reenactment of the First Council of Nicaea in which Nicholas had supposedly violently assaulted Arius for heresy. Cameron claims that, after the council, Nicholas went out and began beating other heretics for teaching false doctrine, and that "Nicholas was 'bad', in a good way". Cameron explains that St. Nicholas was the basis for Santa Claus, who was a byproduct of Nicholas' story being diluted by secular culture. With this knowledge, Christian joyously declares that "Santa is the man".

Reassured of Christmas' Christian roots, Cameron and Christian return to the party. Cameron criticizes people who feel that the holiday is too commercial, saying that because God took on material form, it is appropriate to celebrate using material things through the giving of expensive gifts. Cameron explains that presents represent Jerusalem, and that Christmas is "doing what God does", as God has given humanity many gifts. Cameron then issues a plea to the audience to make Christmas an overtly religious holiday again, "for our children". Christian, as a gift to his wife, organizes a hip hop dance to symbolize his love of Christmas, set to "Angels We Have Heard on High". Cameron, Christian, and all the party guests breakdance in an extended musical sequence. Cameron then tells everyone to feast and suggests the audience organize the best dinner possible for Christmas, but not to forget it is a celebration of God.

== Cast ==
- Kirk Cameron as Kirk
- Darren Doane as Christian White, Kirk's brother-in-law
- Bridgette Ridenour as Kirk's sister
- David Shannon as Diondre
- Raphi Henly as conspiracy theorist
- Ben Kientz as St. Nick

== Release ==
Saving Christmas debuted on 410 screens on November 14, 2014.

=== Home media ===
Saving Christmas was released on DVD on November 3, 2015. The film was also made available on Hulu in March 2016, although it has since been removed from the site.

== Soundtrack ==
Saving Christmas

Soundtrack album by various artists
- Released: October 27, 2014
- Genre: Christmas
- Label: Reunion

A soundtrack album was released on October 27, 2014 by Reunion Records.

1. "Joy" – 1 Girl Nation
2. "Christmas Time Again" – Steven Curtis Chapman
3. "Saving Christmas" – Building 429
4. "Let Us Adore" – Jason Crabb
5. "O Holy Night" – Kerrie Roberts
6. "Away in a Manger" – Casting Crowns
7. "Deck the Halls" – Tenth Avenue North
8. "O Little Town of Bethlehem" – Rebecca St. James
9. "Hark! The Herald Angels Sing" – Matt Maher
10. "O come, O come, Emmanuel" – Rhett Walker Band

== Reception ==
=== Box office ===
On its first weekend, the film came in fifteenth place with ticket sales of $992,087, with a per-screen average of $2,420. In its six-week run, the film grossed $2.7 million at the box office against a $500,000 budget.

=== Critical response ===
Saving Christmas was universally panned by critics, and is often considered to be one of the worst films ever made. On the review aggregator website Rotten Tomatoes, 0% of 19 critics' reviews are positive, with an average rating of 2.4/10. Metacritic, which uses a weighted average, assigned the film a score of 18 out of 100, based on 9 critics, indicating "overwhelming dislike".

New York Times film critic Ben Kenigsberg said that Cameron's acting "sounds so forced you half-expect the camera to pull back to reveal hostage takers". In 2016 the Billings Gazette named it the worst Christmas movie of all time, and Will Nicol of Digital Trends included it on his list of the ten worst movies ever made. Christy Lemire picked Saving Christmas as the worst film she has ever reviewed.

In The Christian Post, an evangelical Christian newspaper, Emma Koonse wrote, "[Kirk Cameron] dismisses theories that Christmas is derived in [sic] the pagan celebration of Winter Solstice in Saving Christmas, offering viewers a Biblical reference to items such as the Christmas tree instead. Furthermore, the film reveals Cameron's take on Santa Claus, the three wise men, and why Christmas is celebrated on Dec. 25 each year... Although Cameron attempts to defend Christmas traditions in Saving Christmas, many Christians remain divided over what the Bible says about celebrating Christ's birth as well as where the varied Christmas traditions originated and what the customs mean in reference to Jesus."

=== Cameron's response ===
On November 20, 2014, Cameron responded to the negative reviews by posting on his Facebook page. He wrote, "Help me storm the gates of Rotten Tomatoes. All of you who love Saving Christmas – go rate it at Rotten Tomatoes right now and send the message to all the critics that WE decide what movies we want our families to see." The attempt backfired, causing Internet users to visit the Rotten Tomatoes website and further condemn the film.

Three weeks after the film's release, the film gained additional notoriety when it became the lowest-rated film on IMDb's bottom 100 list. Cameron later responded to the low rating, saying that it was due to a campaign on Reddit by "haters and atheists" to purposely lower the film's ratings.

=== Awards and nominations ===
| Year | Association | Category | Nominee(s) | Result | Ref(s) |
|---|---|---|---|---|---|
| 2015 | Golden Raspberry Awards | Worst Picture | | Won | |
| 2015 | Golden Raspberry Awards | Worst Actor | Kirk Cameron | Won | |
| 2015 | Golden Raspberry Awards | Worst Supporting Actress | Bridgette Ridenour | Nominated | |
| 2015 | Golden Raspberry Awards | Worst Director | Darren Doane | Nominated | |
| 2015 | Golden Raspberry Awards | Worst Screenplay | Darren Doane and Cheston Harvey | Won | |
| 2015 | Golden Raspberry Awards | Worst Screen Combo | Kirk Cameron and his ego | Won | |

== See also ==
- List of Christmas films
- List of 21st-century films considered the worst
