= Unstoppable (2013 film) =

- Directed by: Darren Doane
- Written by: Kirk Cameron
- Produced by: John Bona; Marshall Foster
- Starring: Kirk Cameron
- Production companies: Liberty University; Camfam Studios
- Release date: September 24, 2013
- Country: United States
- Language: English

Unstoppable is a 2013 American documentary film hosted by Kirk Cameron. Directed by Darren Doane. The film was made in partnership with Liberty University and was released for a one-night-only screening in theaters on September 24, 2013.

== Description ==
According to the project's official Facebook page:

In Unstoppable, a brand-new documentary, Kirk takes you on a personal and inspiring journey to better understand the biggest doubt-raiser in faith: Why? Kirk goes back to the beginning—literally—as he investigates the origins of good and evil and how they impact our lives ... and our eternities. Reminding us that there is great hope, Unstoppable creatively asks—and answers—the age-old question: Where is God in the midst of tragedy and suffering?

The film is made in partnership with Liberty University.

== Facebook and YouTube controversy ==
On July 18, 2013, Kirk Cameron posted a picture to Facebook asking his fans to petition Facebook to stop censoring links to the movie's website. He said, "Calling all friends of Faith, Family, and Freedom! Facebook has officially 'blocked' me and you (and everyone else) from posting any link to my new movie at UnstoppableTheMovieDOTcom." More than 300,000 people shared the picture. The story spread to numerous media outlets such as CBS, ABC and Entertainment Tonight. The link was reinstated soon thereafter.

A spokesperson for Facebook stated that the site "was blocked for a very short period of time after being misidentified as a potential spam or malware site. We learn from rare cases such as these to make our systems even better." Michael Kirkland, communications manager of Facebook, made the following statement to The Christian Post: "From what we can tell, the address purchased for the movie was previously being used as a spam site and it hadn't been refreshed in our system yet. We were in direct contact with Kirk's team on this and reversed the block as soon as we confirmed that the address was no longer being used for spam."

Soon after the link was unblocked on Facebook, a teaser trailer for Unstoppable was blocked on YouTube. It was replaced by a message warning that, "This video has been removed as a violation of YouTube's policy against spam, scams, and commercially deceptive content." YouTube later removed the block after outcries of censorship from fans and media outlets. Representatives for YouTube did not immediately respond to a request for comment.

== Release ==
Unstoppable was released on September 24, 2013 as a one-night live stream from Liberty University. Church showings were scheduled to begin November 15, 2013.

== Home media ==
DVD was made available January 28, 2014.
