= I'm Dickens, He's Fenster =

American TV sitcom

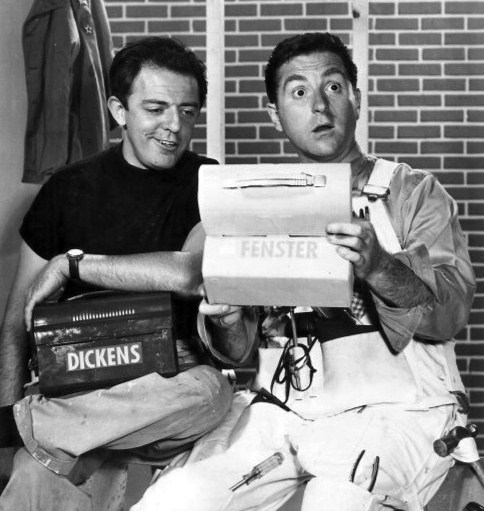
- John Astin as Dickens and Marty Ingels as Fenster (1962)
- Genre: Situation comedy
- Created by: Leonard Stern
- Starring: John Astin; Marty Ingels; Emmaline Henry
- Theme music composer: Irving Szathmary
- Opening theme: "The 'I'm Dickens- He's Fenster' March"
- Composer: Irving Szathmary
- Country of origin: United States
- Original language: English
- No. of seasons: 1
- No. of episodes: 32

Production
- Producer: Leonard Stern
- Camera setup: Multi-camera
- Running time: 22–24 minutes
- Production company: Heyday Productions

Original release
- Network: ABC
- Release: September 28, 1962 – May 10, 1963

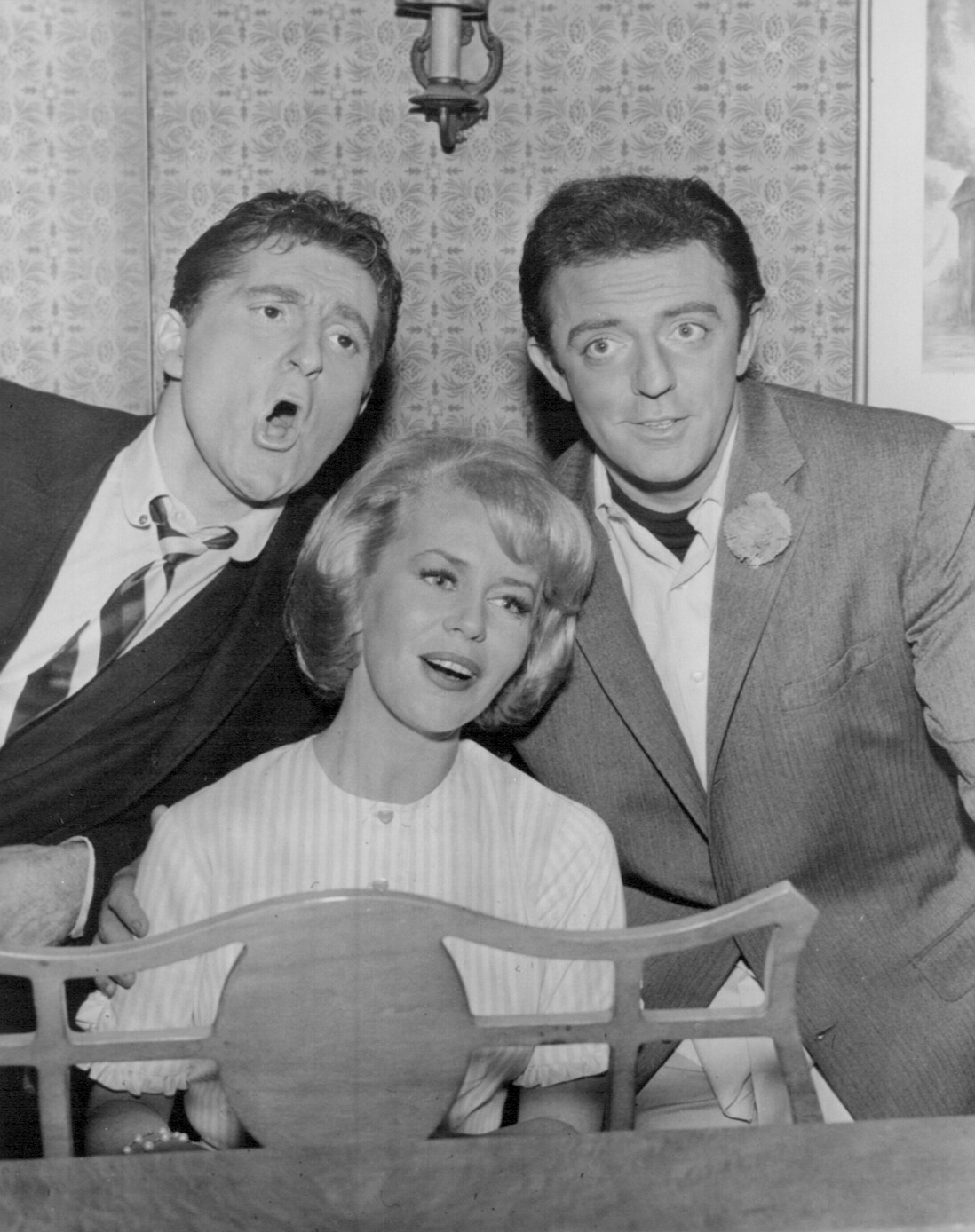
L-R: Marty Ingels, Emmaline Henry and John Astin in episode "The Carpenters Four" (1963)

I'm Dickens, He's Fenster is an American sitcom starring John Astin and Marty Ingels that ran on ABC from September 28, 1962, to May 10, 1963.

== Synopsis ==
The series starred John Astin and Marty Ingels as Harry Dickens and Arch Fenster, "inept Los Angeles carpenters" who were friends, and who worked for the Bannister Construction Company. Physical gags about activities of construction workers formed the basis of each episode.

Fenster was a single playboy who had a bachelor pad and a multi-volume "little black book". Marriage had eluded him despite his having been engaged nine times.

Emmaline Henry appeared as Harry's wife, Kate. That character was the first wife on a TV comedy who worked on a job. They had no children, and Harry Dickens (age 33) looked on Fenster as if he were his son. His personality traits included insecurity and jealousy, and he tended to be pushy and overbearing. Kate Dickens was "extremely patient" and put up with their home's being "always a work in progress" where painting and repairs were concerned.

Appearing regularly, at Dickens and Fenster's workplace, were Frank DeVol (as their mild-mannered boss Myron Bannister), David Ketchum (as Mel Warshaw), Henry Beckman (as Bob Mulligan), and Noam Pitlik (as Bentley). Mulligan and Warshaw were carpenters who provided little help when problems arose on a job site.

Actresses who portrayed Fenster's girlfriends included Yvonne Craig, Ellen Burstyn (as Ellen McRae), and Lee Meriwether.

== Episodes ==
| No. | Title | Directed by | Written by | Original release date |
|---|---|---|---|---|
| 1 | "A Small Matter of Being Fired" | Arthur Hiller | Leonard Stern & Don Hinkley | September 28, 1962 |
Using devious methods, Arch helps Harry get the foreman's position on a house-building project. Guest stars: Vitina Marcus, Yvonne Craig
| 2 | "Nurse Dickens" | Norman Abbott | Leonard Stern & Mel Tolkin | October 5, 1962 |
Harry and Arch pose as doctors to investigate Kate's activities as a nurse.
| 3 | "The Double Life of Mel Warshaw" | Norman Abbott | Leonard Stern & Mel Tolkin | October 12, 1962 |
After seeing a Wanted poster, Harry and Arch are convinced that the photo resembles their friend.
| 4 | "Harry, the Father Image" | Leonard Stern | Story by : Barry Blitzer & Walter Kempley; Teleplay by : Leonard Stern & Mel Tolkin | October 19, 1962 |
Harry gives Arch some misplaced marital advice.
| 5 | "Part-Time Friend" | Norman Abbott | Arthur Alsberg & Bob Fisher | October 26, 1962 |
During the course of his sleep in Harry's home, Arch is heard bad-mouthing him.
| 6 | "The Acting Game" | Leonard Stern | Leonard Stern & Mel Tolkin | November 2, 1962 |
Harry believes that he's been selected to do a television commercial but soon finds out that he has to compete against other carpenters for the job.
| 7 | "The Toupee Story" | Norman Abbott | Leonard Stern & Mel Tolkin | November 9, 1962 |
Harry and Arch's Bannister is bald and believes his indecision is due to his high forehead, which results in the duo convincing him to purchase a toupee.
| 8 | "A Wolf in Friend's Clothing" | Norman Abbott | Leonard Stern & Mel Tolkin | November 16, 1962 |
The daughter of Harry's old friend comes to visit, with Harry becoming protective of her because of the possibility of Arch dating the young woman.
| 9 | "Party, Party, Who's Got the Party?" | Claudio Guzman | Dick Chevillat & Ray Singer | November 23, 1962 |
Arch decides to throw a party, but Harry determines the guest list is too long. The duo then decides to go to another carpenter's party instead.
| 10 | "The Yellow Badge of Courage" | Norman Abbott | Mel Tolkin & Don Hinkley | November 30, 1962 |
Arch is fired from a construction job because a succession of girl friends visit him at work and distract his fellow employees.
| 11 | "The Joke" | Norman Abbott | Story by : Fred Freeman & Garry Marshall; Teleplay by : Don Hinkley, Mel Tolkin & Leonard Stern | December 7, 1962 |
Harry's joke fails to get much response from either Kate or his co-workers.
| 12 | "Love Me, Love My Dog" | Arthur Hiller | Story by : Arthur Alsberg & Bob Fisher; Teleplay by : Arthur Alsberg, Bob Fisher, Don Hinkley & Mel Tolkin | December 14, 1962 |
After Kate suggests Harry give Arch a dog for companionship, Arch becomes so attached to it that he ignores everyone.
| 13 | "Here's to the Three of Us" | Arthur Hiller | Mel Tolkin & Don Hinkley | December 21, 1962 |
Harry and Kate try to give a dinner party without Arch finding out about it.
| 14 | "Get Off My Back" | Norman Abbott | Leonard Stern & Mel Tolkin | December 28, 1962 |
Harry tries to get away from Arch long enough to purchase a gift to celebrate their first meeting a decade earlier.
| 15 | "How Not to Succeed in Business" | Norman Abbott | Wilton Schiller & Jay Sommers | January 4, 1963 |
Harry and Arch quit their job and set up an independent operation with offices set up in Harry and Kate's living room.
| 16 | "The Godfathers" | Norman Abbott | Don Hinkley, Mel Tolkin & Leonard Stern | January 11, 1963 |
Harry and Arch are given the task of not only naming a co-worker's 11th child, but also serving as godfathers.
| 17 | "The Carpenters Four" | Arthur Hiller | Don Hinkley & Mel Tolkin | January 18, 1963 |
Harry promises to produce a movie star for the carpenter's welfare show, but when he fails, Arch tries to help him out. Brief appearance by Jim Nabors.
| 18 | "The Great Valenciaga" | Unknown | Unknown | January 25, 1963 |
While Mulligan attempts to protect his sister Molly, a singer at a local nightclub, from smooth-talking men, Arch decides to create the alter ego of Valenciaga, a Latin dancer.
| 19 | "Mr. Take Over" | Arthur Hiller | Jerry Davis & Danny Simon | February 1, 1963 |
After Harry is taken to a local hospital following a minor accident on the job, Arch's exaggerated concern results in attendants thinking he's the patient.
| 20 | "Have Car, Will Quarrel" | Claudio Guzman | Story by : Harry Crane & Stan Dreben; Teleplay by : Mel Tolkin & Don Hinkley | February 8, 1963 |
Harry gets Arch and Mulligan to split the cost of a car with him and the three partners end up buying Mel's car.
| 21 | "Say It with Pictures" | Norman Abbott | William Raynor & Myles Wilder | February 15, 1963 |
Arch and Harry decide to replace the outmoded carpenters' manual with a new one. Harry will be in charge of the text, with Arch handling the photographs.
| 22 | "Senior Citizen Charlie" | Norman Abbott | Sheldon Keller, Howard Merrill, Don Hinkley & Mel Tolkin | February 22, 1963 |
Harry, Arch and their co-workers decide to throw a retirement party for a fellow carpenter who's being forcibly retired.
| 23 | "The Bet" | Norman Abbott | Story by : Jerry Davis; Teleplay by : Don Hinkley & Mel Tolkin | March 1, 1963 |
Arch's reputation as a lover is at stake when he and a painter wager on their mutual attempt to woo an attractive art gallery manager.
| 24 | "The Syndicate" | Norman Abbott | Story by : Jay Sommers & John Greene; Teleplay by : William Raynor & Myles Wilder | March 8, 1963 |
During the demolition of a mansion once owned by a notorious mobster, Harry and Arch discover a hidden strongbox.
| 25 | "Is There a Doctor in the House?" | Norman Abbott | Jerry Davis & Mel Diamond | March 15, 1963 |
Arch has a new romantic interest—a nurse named Beverly who's under the mistaken impression that he's a doctor.
| 26 | "Harry, the Contractor" | Norman Abbott | Don Hinkley & Mel Tolkin | March 22, 1963 |
Kate's attempt at getting Harry to do any work around the house fails, which results in her deciding to hire a carpenter. That means that Harry will have to bid on the job.
| 27 | "Table Tennis, Anyone?" | Claudio Guzman | Story by : Henry Sharp & Bill Freedman; Teleplay by : Danny Simon & Milt Rosen | March 29, 1963 |
Harry is chosen as the captain of a table tennis team that's been formed by the carpenters to compete in an industrial league.
| 28 | "Kick Me Kate" | Claudio Guzmán | Frank Fox & Martin Roth | April 5, 1963 |
Deciding that Kate doesn't love him enough, Harry decides to try to make her jealous.
| 29 | "Number One Son" | Norman Abbott | Mel Diamond & Jerry Davis | April 12, 1963 |
Mel believes that he's been a disappointment to his son Ralph, which results in Harry and Arch suggesting that he take the boy on a camping trip.
| 30 | "Big Opening at the Hospital" | Norman Abbott | James Allardice, Tom Adair, Don Hinkley & Mel Tolkin | April 26, 1963 |
Kate is scheduled to sing at a benefit for the hospital, but Harry's afraid that a talent scout will spot her and turn her into a big star.
| 31 | "King Archibald, the First" | Norman Abbott | Victor McLeod & Bob O'Brien | May 3, 1963 |
Arch falls for a princess who happens to be masquerading as her own maid.
| 32 | "Hotel Fenster" | Leonard Stern | Jerry Davis & Mel Diamond | May 10, 1963 |
Arch's bachelor apartment quickly becomes a crowded refuge after his friends all have arguments with their wives.

== Production ==
A product of Heyday Productions, the series (originally titled The Workers) was created and produced by Leonard Stern and filmed at Desilu. It was sponsored by El Producto cigars and Procter and Gamble.

I'm Dickens, He's Fenster was filmed in black-and-white in front of a live audience which, in that era, was unusual for a show not built around an established star such as Lucille Ball or Danny Thomas. The theatrical approach, combining witty remarks with moments of broad slapstick comedy, was well received by the audience, whose laughter sometimes drowned some of the dialogue.

Writers included Stern, Don Hinkley, Mel Tolkin, Sheldon Keller, Howard Merrill, Jerry Davis, Frank Fox, Marty Roth, Mel Diamond, Barry Blitzer, Walter Kempley, Ray Singer, Dick Chevillat, Fred Freeman, Garry Marshall, Wilton Schiller, Arthur Alsberg, and Bob Fisher. Among the directors were Stern, Norman Abbott, Claudio Guzman, and Arthur Hiller. Irving Szathmary composed the theme, "The Dickens and Fenster March".

The program followed the cartoon series The Flintstones and preceded 77 Sunset Strip on Fridays at 9 p.m. Eastern Time. It was programmed opposite Sing Along with Mitch and Route 66 (both of which had debuted earlier), and "it just didn't have good ratings". "The ratings hadn't come out for some reason, they were delayed," recalled Ingels. "Two weeks later the ratings came out and we, little Dickens and Fenster, had beat the competition." But by that time, ABC had already canceled the show. "It was too late. We were history." ABC salvaged its mistake by sending the 32 episodes into syndication immediately, and local TV stations continued the show's run.

== Critical response ==
The New York Times's review of the series's premiere episode suggested that the program "could be a surprise success of the television season." It noted that the series "has no established stars in its cast", with Ingels "the chief clown of the new series." Elements of the show reminded the reviewer of a vaudeville act that had "clumsy routines with hammers, boards, and other simple props".

Some reviews compared the physical comedy of Dickens and Fenster to that of Laurel and Hardy. Stern said that he received a fan letter from Stan Laurel and that Laurel said that the program "was the only TV show he watched." Ingels confirmed it: "I have a fan letter somewhere in my house from Stan Laurel. What a treasure that was."

== Home media ==
On April 10, 2012, Lightyear Entertainment & TV Time Machine Productions released I'm Dickens, He's Fenster- 50th Anniversary Collectors Edition: Volume 1 on DVD in Region 1. The 3-disc set contains the first 16 episodes of the series as well as several bonus features.

== Comic books ==
Dell published two I'm Dickens, He's Fenster comic books while the show was on the air.
