= Lifemark =

2022 American Christian drama film

- Theatrical release poster
- Directed by: Kevin Peeples
- Written by: Stephen Kendrick; Alex Kendrick; Kevin Peeples
- Produced by: Aaron Burns; Justin Tolley
- Starring: Kirk Cameron; Alex Kendrick; Rebecca Rogers Nelson; Dawn Long; Justin Sterner; Marisa Hampton; Raphael Ruggero
- Cinematography: Bob Scott
- Edited by: Bill Ebel; Alex Kendrick; Kevin Peeples
- Music by: Kyle McCuiston
- Production companies: Faithstep Films; WTA Media; Kirk Cameron Entertainment; Kendrick Brothers
- Distributed by: Fathom Events
- Release dates: August 28, 2022 (New Orleans); September 9, 2022 (United States)
- Running time: 120 minutes
- Country: United States
- Language: English
- Box office: $5.4 million

Lifemark is a 2022 American Christian drama film by director Kevin Peeples, adapting the true story of the adoption of David Scotton, previously depicted in the 2018 short documentary film I Lived on Parker Avenue. It tells the story of how a young man's mother considered aborting him, but instead made an adoption plan for him, and later reconnected with him as a young adult.

Kirk Cameron, Alex Kendrick, and Raphael Ruggero star, while the Kendrick Brothers co-wrote the script with Peeples and act as executive producers. It is the Kendrick brothers' eighth film, the fifth through their subsidiary, Kendrick Brothers Productions, their first adaptation of a true story and their first film since Flywheel not to be distributed by Sony Pictures Releasing. Their initial five films were created under Sherwood Pictures. The film was released on September 9, 2022, via Fathom Events after traditional distributors declined to release it. It received generally positive reviews, and its initial one-week theatrical run was extended an extra week due to its box-office success.

== Plot ==
As a pregnant teenager, Melissa is preparing for an abortion to end her unwanted pregnancy, when at the very last minute she told the doctor, "I can't do this." Instead, she chooses to deliver her son and place him for adoption, where he is adopted by the Colton family of Louisiana. Eighteen years later, Melissa reaches out to David through the adoption agency, leading to their connection on social media and ultimately meeting face-to-face.

== Cast ==
- Raphael Ruggero as David Colton.
- Kirk Cameron as Jimmy Colton, David's adoptive father.
- Rebecca Rogers Nelson as Susan Colton, David's adoptive mother.
- Dawn Long as Melissa Cates, David's birth mother, as she makes contact with him.
- Alex Kendrick as Shawn Cates, Melissa's husband.
- Marisa Hampton as Young Melissa, as she gives birth to David and places him for adoption.
- Lowery Brown as Brian, David's biological father.
- Iain Tucker as Young Brian.
- Justin Sterner as Nate, David's friend.

== Themes ==
Lifemark is the culmination of David Scotton's story, which he began telling in a 2011 "Louisiana Pro-Life Oratory Contest at Jesuit High School in New Orleans." The story was picked up by Louisiana Right to Life, who funded the documentary film I Lived on Parker Avenue for $67,000. After the film's release, Scotton spent his time "visiting Catholic high schools across the country, appearing on national television, showing the film to members of Congress and telling just about all who would listen about the adoption alternative." While the Kendrick Brothers intended to tell a pro-life story, they started adapting the story in 2019; executive producer Stephen Kendrick attributed the post-Dobbs release of the project to providential timing. Both Stephen Kendrick and Cameron have adopted children, and Cameron's wife was herself adopted, which both cite as a motivation for their involvement with this film. Cameron publicly promoted the film and explained his motivation in a speech at the 2022 March for Life. Bloomberg noted that Cameron "acknowledged adoption doesn’t always work as well as portrayed" in the film.

== Production ==
Kirk Cameron approached the Kendricks, with whom he had previously worked on Fireproof, to produce the movie after seeing David's story depicted in I Lived on Parker Avenue. For the time jump, the filmmakers chose to use two sets of actors to play David's birth parents, while de-aging techniques to depict David's adoptive parents. "Kirk Cameron looks like a 50-year-old and a (roughly) 30-year-old – all in the same film," Crosswalk.com observed. Coles was involved in the creative process, being invited by the producers to help evaluate actresses who would play her, and Long subsequently spent time with Coles preparing for the role. A novelization by Chris Fabry (ISBN 978-1496461278) was released by Tyndale House approximately one month before the film's release.

Alex Kendrick said that they could not secure distribution because the film concerned abortion, which Cameron attributed to studios' cowardice. In an interview with Baptist Press, executive producer Stephen Kendrick noted that "Lifemark doesn’t focus in on the dark side of abortion, it focuses in on the positive beautiful side of adoption." Anti-abortion organizations such as Live Action have used the film as a jumping off point to criticize abortion.

== Release ==
Lifemark was released September 9, 2022, through Fathom Events, for a planned one-week engagement. It had its New Orleans premiere on August 28. On September 15, 2022, it was announced that the film's theatrical run would be extended for another week.

== Reception ==
=== Box office ===
Lifemark was released alongside Brahmāstra: Part One – Shiva and Barbarian, and made $855,466 from 1,560 theaters on its first day and $2.2 million in its opening weekend.

=== Critical response ===
On the review aggregator website Rotten Tomatoes, 83% of six critics' reviews are positive, with an average rating of 7.8/10. Michael Foust of the Baptist Messenger praised Raphael Ruggero as "stellar" and opined that the "movie's first hour is as gripping as any Kendrick Brothers film ever." Leah Savas of World magazine criticized the film in comparison to its source material, opining that "[i]n comparison [to I Lived on Parker Avenue], the movie feels like a cheap reenactment with too-well-dressed characters living in too-well-decorated houses." Kathryn Jean Lopez disagreed, stating that it overcame her skepticism that it could "captured the beauty of the story that’s captured in real time by Parker Ave" National Catholic Register compared it to Unplanned and applauded the film for its wholesome mood but criticized it for lack of conflict and character development.
