= Darren Doane =

American director

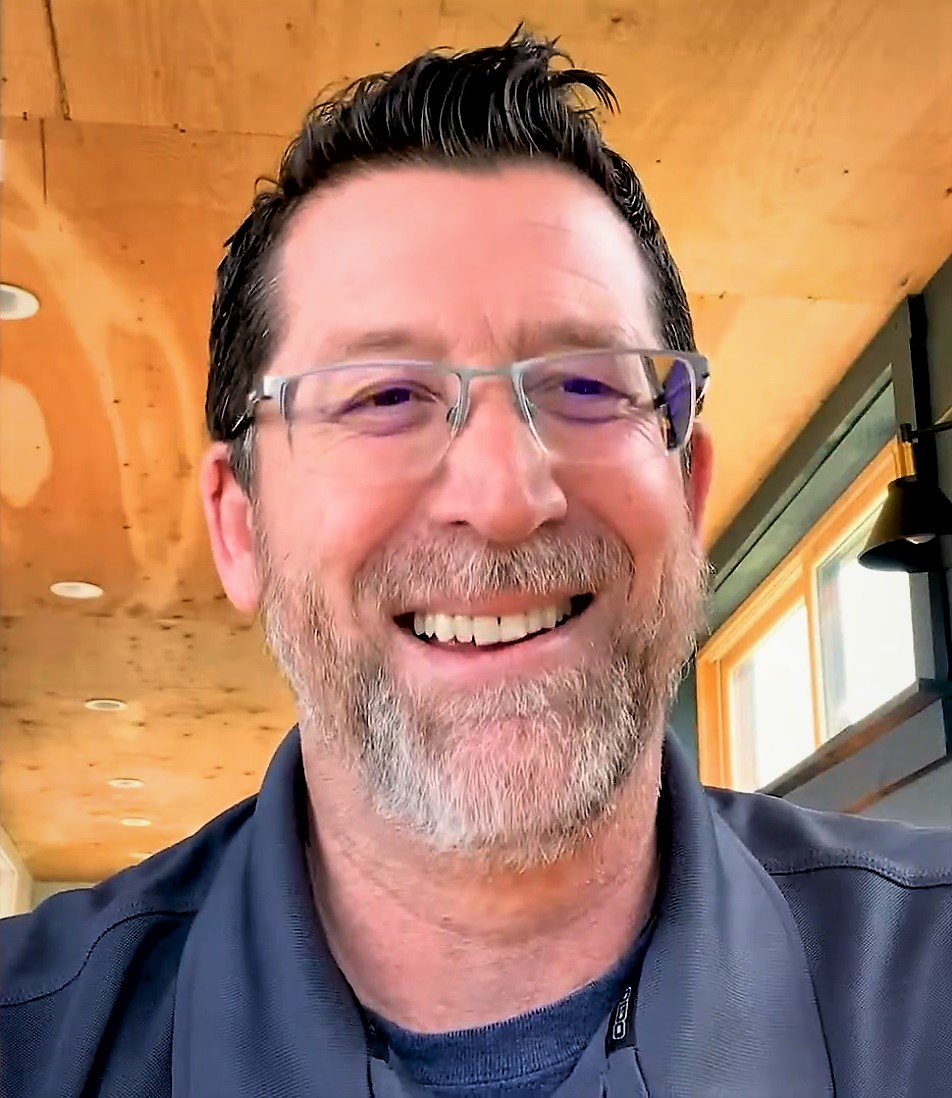
- Doane interviewed in 2020
- Born: September 20, 1972 (age 54); Westlake Village, California, U.S.

Darren Doane is an American filmmaker, actor, and music video director. He started his early music video work with Ken Daurio and directed several early Blink-182 music videos.

Prior to directing commercials and music videos, Doane directed two live action short film adaptations of the Malibu Comics superheroes Hardcase (a six-minute music video style promo starring British kickboxer Gary Daniels) and Firearm (a 35-minute movie which served as a prequel to the actual comic). Doane is best known for co-writing and directing Saving Christmas, in which he also co-starred alongside Kirk Cameron.

== Filmography ==
=== Film ===
Year	Film	Director	Writer	Producer	Notes
1993	Pennywise: Home Videos	Yes	No	Yes	Concert movie
1999	Godmoney	Yes	Yes	No	
2000	Ultimate Target	Yes	No	No	
2001	Black Friday	Yes	Yes	No	
2002	42K	Yes	Yes	No	Co-director and co-writer with Ken Daurio
2004	The Battle for L.A.	Yes	No	Yes	Documentary film Also cinematographer
2005	Unleaded	Yes	No	No	
2008	Eyes Front	Yes	Yes	Yes	Also co-cinematographer and editor
2009	Jason Mraz's Beautiful Mess: Live on Earth	Yes	No	No	Concert movie
2009	Collison: Christopher Hitcher vs Douglas Wilson	Yes	No	No	Documentary Film
2013	Unstoppable	Yes	No	No	Documentary film Also actor: Bearded Man
2013	How to Answer the Fool	No	No	Executive	Documentary film Also co-editor
2014	Mercy Rule	Yes	No	No	
2014	Saving Christmas	Yes	Yes	Yes	Also actor: Christian White Golden Raspberry Award for Worst Screenplay Golden Raspberry Award for Worst Director (nominated)
2015	The Free Speech Apocalypse	Yes	No	Yes	Documentary film
2016	The River Thief	No	No	Executive	
2016	Shorebreak: The Clark Little Story	No	No	Executive	Documentary film

=== Short film ===
Year	Film	Director	Writer	Producer	Notes
1993	Hardcase	Yes	Yes	Yes	
1993	Firearm	Yes	No	No	
2006	Metal by Numbers	Yes	No	No	Also cinematographer
