= Monumental: In Search of America's National Treasure =

2012 film

- Directed by: Duane Barnhart
- Written by: Kevin Miller; Marshall Foster
- Produced by: John Bona; Bill Hough; Mark Gambee
- Starring: Kirk Cameron
- Production company: Pyro Pictures
- Distributed by: Monumental Multimedia, LLC
- Release date: March 27, 2012
- Country: United States
- Language: English
- Budget: $500,000 (est.)
- Box office: $1.23 million

Monumental: In Search of America's National Treasure is a 2012 American documentary film hosted by Kirk Cameron. Directed by Duane Barnhart and written by Kevin Miller, Cameron's mission in making the film is to "search for the real treasure of America."

Monumental began its box office run on March 27, 2012 with a Tuesday night premiere. It grossed $1.23 million against an estimated budget of $500,000.

== Plot ==
Cameron asserts that a blueprint of America's treasure is manifest in the National Monument to the Forefathers, a large 1889 granite structure in Plymouth, Massachusetts, that commemorates the Mayflower Pilgrims. Co-writer Marshall Foster ascribes to this statue the contextual validity of Monumental's message, based on the statue's symbolism and engraved dedication. According to Foster, "The monument depicts Faith, and Faith is pointing to God and has an open Geneva Bible in the right hand and a star of wisdom".

== Production ==
Filming of Monumental was completed in September 2010. The film includes many interviews, conducted by Kirk Cameron, with politicians and religious personalities, including Os Guinness (Christian author), Barry Black (current Chaplain of the U.S. Senate), David Barton (discussing The Godless Constitution), Stephen McDowell, Paul Jehle, Herbert Titus, Alveda King, and Todd Akin (former U.S. Representative from Missouri).

=== Interview with Piers Morgan ===
In an effort to promote Monumental, Cameron went on the Piers Morgan Tonight talk show. Asked about his views on homosexuality, Cameron said, "I think that... it's unnatural. I think that... it's detrimental, and ultimately destructive to so many of the foundations of civilization." This sparked a controversy within Hollywood, with celebrities such as Roseanne, Jesse Tyler Ferguson, as well as former Growing Pains co-stars Alan Thicke and Tracey Gold denouncing Cameron's comments. Cameron claims that the interview was edited down and did not give a proper representation of his views. The controversy may have worked in Monumental's favor because it raised awareness of the film.

== Release ==
Monumental was scheduled for a one-night theatrical release on March 27, 2012. Cameron promoted the film at the 2012 Conservative Political Action Conference.

=== Box office ===
It went on as a limited release in select theaters, grossing $28,340 on its first night. Peaking at 27 theaters in its third week, the film remained in release for 52 days and ultimately grossed $1.23 million.

=== Reception ===
Entertainment Weekly gave the film a poor review, calling it a "slick and exceedingly odd proselytizing tool," and giving it a grade of C. The film does not have enough reviews from critics to receive a summary rating on Rotten Tomatoes.

Joni Eareckson Tada, an evangelical Christian author and radio host, wrote, "Informative... Enlightening... Amazing... these are the words that aptly describe my response to this remarkable movie." California preacher Francis Chan praised the movie's message, saying "After seeing this film, I have never been more proud of our country's heritage and more concerned about our future."

Americans United for Separation of Church and State's Joseph L. Conn wrote "The theme of the movie seems to be that the Pilgrims came to America seeking religious liberty, and they set up a model Christian community that we ought to emulate today," and continued "Well, here's some news, Kirk and Company. The Pilgrims and Puritans did come here seeking religious liberty, but they set up a regime that gave freedom only to themselves, denying it to others. In keeping with its religious viewpoint, Plymouth Colony prescribed the death penalty for adulterers, homosexuals and witches, whipping for denying the scriptures and a fine for harboring a Quaker." He ended his review saying "Don't be misled by Kirk Cameron's charming smile. It masks a chilling agenda."

Gawker's Rich Juzwiak, in a review titled "Kirk Cameron: A Bigot in Pilgrim's Clothing", said the movie "is too petrified to say anything, a relic of this era of the shameful bigot who'll spew hatred and then get mad when it's recognized as such. Monumental is a neutering of even Cameron's cowardly waffling, in which he stood by his comments about homosexuality – while clarifying that he loves gay people and don't [sic] think they should be mistreated. Last night, he didn't even have the balls to be contradictory."

Radio commentator Glenn Beck said, "This is A) a great movie to see. B) a great movie to bring your kids to, and teach them about the history of our country, and C) it is important, because we need to start supporting people that are doing things like this..."

The documentary was reviewed in episode 74 of the podcast show Cognitive Dissonance (along with fellow podcaster George Hrab guesting). The hosts criticized it for the elements of revisionist history, bias, and general poor quality.
