= Chih-Yuan Chen =

Taiwanese writer and illustrator

Chen Chih-yuan
- 陳致元
- Born: 1975 (age 50–51)
- Occupation: Writer
- Writing career
- Notable awards: Hsin Yi Picture Book Award

Chen Chih-yuan (Chinese: 陳致元; born 1975) is a picture book writer and illustrator from Taiwan. Several of his books have been translated into English, including Guji Guji, the story of a 'crocoduck' described in a review by The New York Times as having "vivid characters...rendered with wit and warmth".

Chen is a three-time winner of the Hsin Yi Picture Book Award. The English-language translation of Guji Guji was an ALA Notable Children's Book and appeared on the New York Times Bestseller List.

== Works ==
- The Featherless Chicken Heryin Books, Inc., 2006, ISBN 978-0-9762056-9-2
- Guji Guji. Kane/Miller Book Publishers, Inc. 2007. ISBN 978-1-933605-34-0.
- The Best Christmas Ever, Heryin Books, 2006, ISBN 978-0-9762056-2-3
- "小鱼散步" On My Way to Buy Eggs, Kane/Miller Book Publishers, 2003, ISBN 978-1-929132-49-2
- Artie and Julie , Heryin Books, 2008, ISBN 978-0-9787550-3-4
