= Kirk Cameron =

American actor (born 1970)

- Cameron in 2023
- Born: Kirk Thomas Cameron; October 12, 1970 (age 56); Los Angeles, California, U.S.
- Occupations: Actor; author; documentarian; evangelist; producer; television host
- Years active: 1979–present
- Spouse: Chelsea Noble (m. 1991)
- Children: 6
- Relatives: Candace Cameron Bure (sister)
- Website: kirkcameron.com

Kirk Thomas Cameron (born October 12, 1970) is an American actor, author, evangelist, television host, documentarian and producer. He first gained fame as a teen actor playing Mike Seaver on the ABC sitcom Growing Pains (1985–1992), a role for which he was nominated for two Golden Globe Awards.

Cameron made several other television and film appearances through the 1980s and 1990s, including the films Like Father Like Son (1987) and Listen to Me (1989). In the 2000s, he portrayed Cameron "Buck" Williams in the Left Behind film series and Caleb Holt in the drama film Fireproof (2008). His 2014 film, Saving Christmas, was panned by critics and made the IMDb Bottom 100 List within one month of its theatrical release, with some critics even labelling it one of the worst movies ever made. He has produced films since then, including Lifemark (2022), which was commercially successful. In 2022, he wrote a faith-based children's book, As You Grow, which he read at libraries the following year during a well attended nationwide book tour.

Cameron is an evangelical Christian who partners with Ray Comfort in the evangelistic ministry The Way of the Master, and the co-founder of The Firefly Foundation with his wife, actress Chelsea Noble.

== Early life ==
Cameron was born in Panorama City, a neighborhood in the San Fernando Valley region of Los Angeles. He is the oldest of four children born to parents Barbara (née Bausmith) and Robert Cameron, a retired schoolteacher. His three sisters are Bridgette, Melissa, and fellow actor Candace, who portrayed D.J. Tanner on the television sitcom Full House. Cameron attended school on the set of Growing Pains, instead of a public or private school having many other students. However, he went to some classes at Chatsworth High School during production breaks and graduated with honors in their class of 1988. Cameron was an atheist in his early teens. When he was 18, during the height of his career on Growing Pains, he became a born-again Christian.

== Career ==
=== 1980s–1990s ===
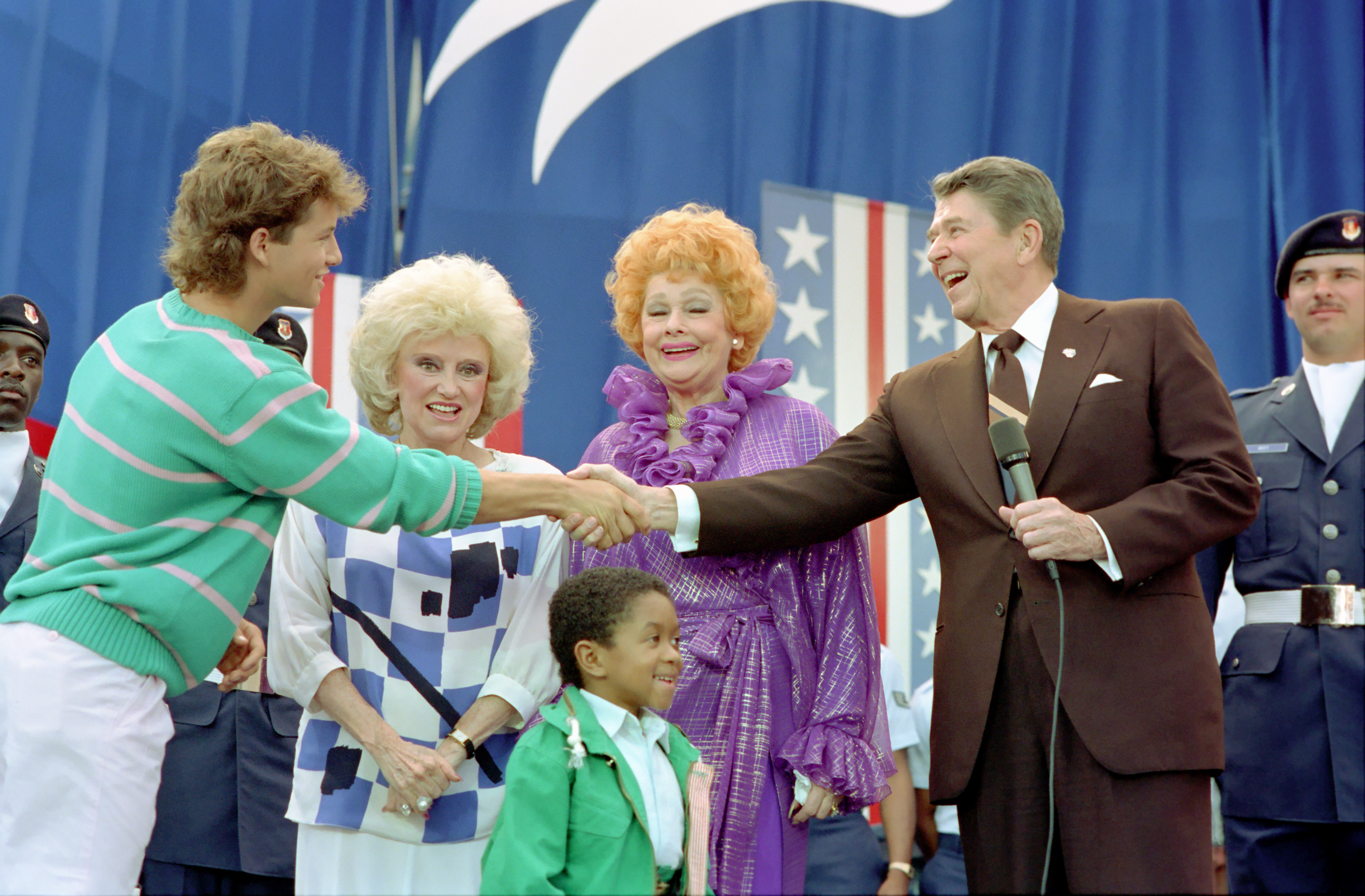
Cameron with President Ronald Reagan in 1987

Cameron began acting at age nine, and his first job was in an advertisement for a breakfast cereal. His first starring role was at age 13, in the television series Two Marriages. At this age, he appeared in several television shows and films. He became famous in 1985 after being cast as Mike Seaver in the ABC television sitcom Growing Pains. In the series, Mike would eventually have a girlfriend named Kate MacDonald, played by Chelsea Noble, Cameron's future wife. Cameron was nominated for two Golden Globe Awards for his role, and subsequently became a teen heartthrob in the late 1980s, while appearing on the covers of several teen magazines, including Tiger Beat, Teen Beat, 16 and others. At the time, he was making $50,000 a week. He was also in a 60-second Pepsi commercial during Super Bowl XXIV. Cameron also guest-starred in the 1988 Full House episode "Just One of the Guys", in which he played Cousin Steve of D.J. Tanner, the role played by Cameron's sister, Candace.

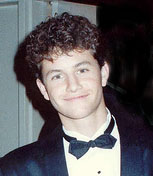
Cameron at the Emmy Awards in 1989

Cameron went on to star in many films, including 1987's Like Father Like Son (a body-switch comedy with Dudley Moore), which was a box office success. His next theatrical film, 1989's Listen to Me, performed poorly at the box office. When Growing Pains ended in 1992, Cameron went on to star in The WB sitcom Kirk, which premiered in 1995 and ended two years later. In Kirk, Cameron played Kirk Hartman, a 24-year-old who has to raise his siblings. Cameron and Noble also worked together on Kirk.

In around 1990, Cameron, along with his wife, Chelsea Noble, founded The Firefly Foundation, which runs Camp Firefly, a summer camp that gives terminally ill and seriously ill children and their families a free week's vacation.

=== 2000s ===
Cameron mostly left mainstream film and television, though a decade after Growing Pains ended, he starred in a television reunion film, The Growing Pains Movie, in 2000, and another one, Growing Pains: Return of the Seavers, in 2004. Cameron reunited with the cast of Growing Pains for a CNN Larry King Live interview, which aired on February 7, 2006, in conjunction with the Warner Bros. release of the complete first season of Growing Pains on DVD. Aside from this, Cameron has often worked in Christian-themed productions, among them the post-Rapture films: Left Behind: The Movie; Left Behind II: Tribulation Force; and Left Behind: World at War, in which he plays Cameron "Buck" Williams. Cameron's wife Noble also starred in the film series, playing Hattie Durham. Cameron has worked with Cloud Ten Pictures, a company which produces Christian-themed films, and has starred in several films, including The Miracle of the Cards. He also appeared in the 2008 drama film, Fireproof, which was produced by Sherwood Pictures. The film was created on a budget of $500,000, with Cameron as the lead actor, portraying Captain Caleb Holt. Though it was a low-budget film, the film grossed $33,415,129 and was a box office success. It was the highest grossing independent film of 2008.

Cameron relates in his autobiography that he once turned down a television series because, as he put it, he was unwilling to spend more time being a make-believe husband and father to an on-set wife and children than he would spend with his actual wife and children, choosing instead to appear in or produce films and television shows, whose content is in keeping with his faith-based values. He also tours the nation to give marriage and family seminars and talks.

=== 2010s ===
In 2012, Cameron was the narrator and host of the documentary film Monumental: In Search of America's National Treasure. On its opening day, March 27, 2012, Monumental grossed $28,340. The film stayed in theaters until May 20, 2012, grossing a total of $1.23 million. On April 11, 2012, Cameron was honored by Indiana Wesleyan University, and inducted into their Society of World Changers during a ceremony in which he spoke on IWU's campus.

In 2013, Cameron announced he would be the host of the film Unstoppable slated to premiere September 24, 2013. A trailer for the film was blocked on Facebook, with Cameron speculating that it was due to the film's religious content. Facebook subsequently removed the block, stating it was the result of a mistake by an automated system and a spam site previously registered at the same web address.

Cameron starred in and produced the 2014 family film Mercy Rule, in which he plays a father who tries to save his small business from lobbyists, while supporting his son, who dreams of being a pitcher, in Little League Baseball. Cameron's real-life wife plays his wife in the film, which was released direct-to-video and via digital download. Also in 2014, Cameron starred in the Christian-themed comedy film, Saving Christmas. The film was panned by critics, and winning the 2014 Golden Raspberry Award for Worst Picture and Worst Screenplay. Cameron also won the award for Worst Actor and Worst Screen Combo, which he won with "his ego". Cameron starred in Extraordinary, a 2017 film made by Liberty University students. That was the first such film to be released nationally, for one night in September 2017. The film follows the dream of a marathon running Liberty professor, whose cross-country trek strains his body and marriage. In August 2017, Cameron and Noble created the online marriage course, The Heart of Family: Six Weeks to a Happier Home and a Healthier Family.

In the 2018 documentary film Connect, Cameron helps parents with navigating the dangers of technology, including social media, for their children. In 2019, he appeared in an episode of Fuller House, the Netflix sequel to Full House.

=== 2020s ===
In 2021, Cameron started hosting the show, Takeaways with Kirk Cameron, on TBN. He interviews guests, many of whom are well-known, to discuss pressing issues for Christians with the goal of finding takeaways that everyday Christians can use in their own lives.

In 2022, Cameron starred in the commercially successful anti-abortion film Lifemark. Cameron played Jimmy Colton, the adoptive father of David Colton. That same year, Cameron wrote a faith-based children's book, As You Grow, published by Brave Books, which follows the life of a tree as it grows and shares "biblical wisdom through the seasons of life." The following year, Cameron embarked on a nationwide book tour, reading his book to often over-capacity crowds at many libraries.

== Conversion to Christianity ==
After converting to Protestant Christianity, Cameron stated in his autobiography, he came to feel that some of his scenes were antithetical to his newfound faith, and inappropriate for the family viewers that were the show's intended audience. Among these was a scene that called for the unmarried Mike Seaver to share a bed with a girl and, in the morning, say to her, "What's your name again?" For these reasons, he began insisting that these types of storylines be edited to remove the parts that he found objectionable.

After the series ended, Cameron did not maintain contact with his former co-stars. Cameron has said that this was not due to any animosity on his part toward any of his former cast members, but an outgrowth of his and his wife's desire to start a new life away from the entertainment industry and, as he put it, "the circus he had been in for the past seven years".

Before the premiere of The Growing Pains Movie in 2000, for which the entire main cast reunited, Cameron described his regrets over how his relationship with his castmates changed after his religious conversion during production of the series, saying, "I definitely kind of made an about-face, going toward another aspect of my life. I shifted my focus from 100% on the show, to 100% on [my new life], and left 0% on the show—and even the friendships that were a part of that show. If I could go back, I think I could make decisions that were less inadvertently hurtful to the cast—like talking and explaining to them why I just wanted to have my family at my wedding."

In a 2011 Growing Pains cast reunion on Good Morning America, Alan Thicke, who played Cameron's father, said, "Kirk's choices for a lot of people seemed extreme, but when you think about all of the choices that kids could make under the pressure that he had, what better choice could you make than to choose a religious spiritual life?".

Cameron's conversion to Christianity also prompted a commitment to kissing no one other than his wife onscreen. For this reason, his real-life wife served as a stand-in for a scene in the film Fireproof in which his character, Caleb Holt, kisses his wife Catherine, who is played in the film by Erin Bethea. The scene was shot in silhouette to obscure this fact.

== Evangelistic ministry ==
Cameron partnered with fellow evangelist Ray Comfort to teach evangelism methods through the ministry they founded, The Way of the Master, and the television show of the same name that Cameron co-hosts. It won the National Religious Broadcasters' Best Program Award for two consecutive years. It also formerly featured a radio show known as The Way of the Master Radio with talk show host Todd Friel. The radio show was later canceled, and replaced with Wretched Radio, hosted by Friel.

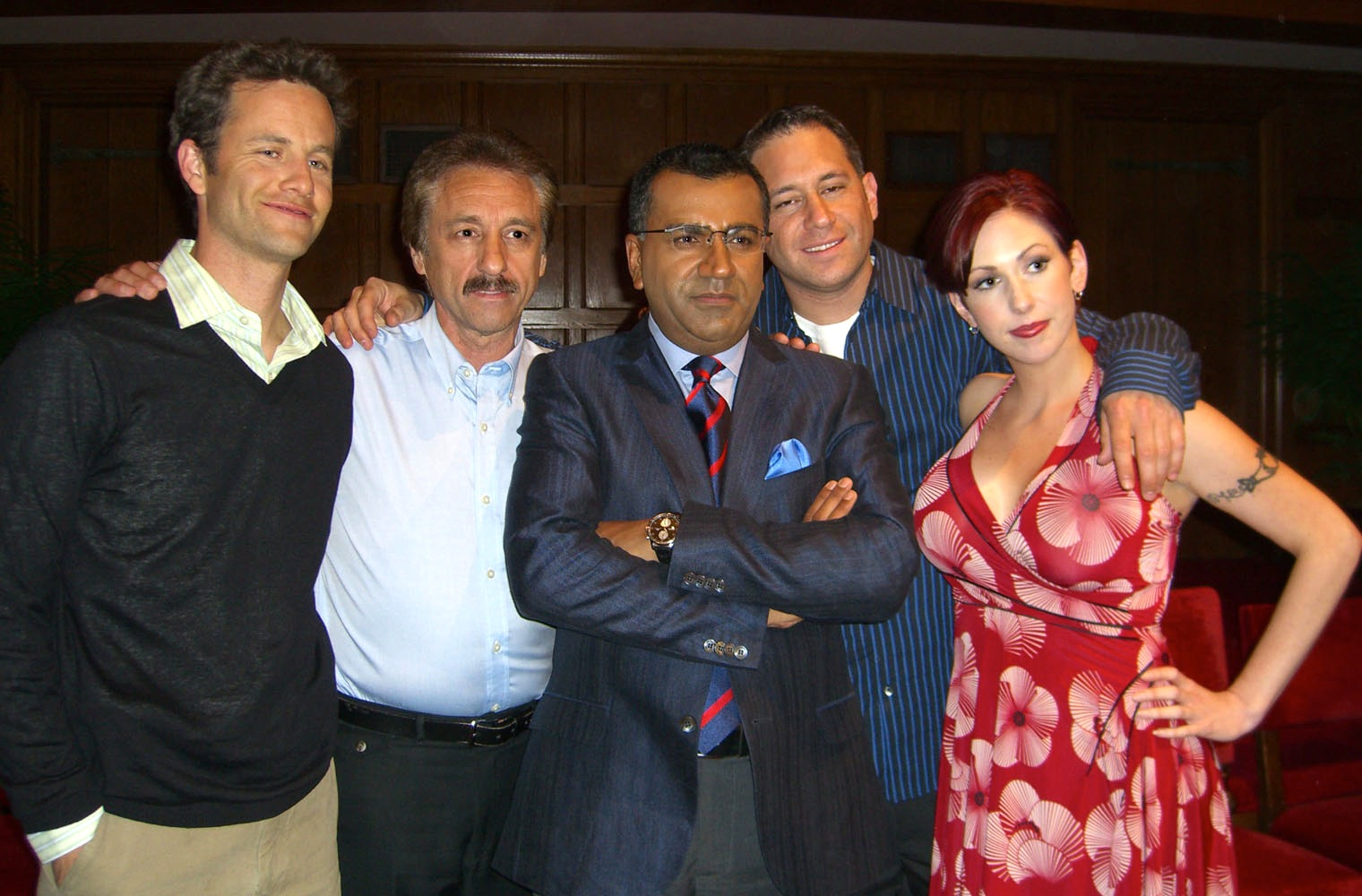
From left to right: Cameron with evangelist Ray Comfort, moderator Martin Bashir, Brian Sapient and Kelly O'Connor in 2007

Cameron holds up a composite picture, and cites the absence of a crocoduck as evidence against evolution, during a debate on the existence of God at Calvary Baptist Church in Manhattan in 2007.

Cameron and Comfort participated in a televised debate with atheists Brian Sapient and Kelly O'Conner of the Rational Response Squad, at Calvary Baptist Church, in Manhattan, on May 5, 2007. It was moderated by ABC's Martin Bashir and parts of it were aired on Nightline. At issue was the existence of God, which Comfort stated at various times during his ministry that he could prove scientifically without relying on faith or the Bible. However, he never committed to this restriction for the debate, itself, as later clarified by The Christian Post in a correction they made at the very end of their article about the debate. The audience was composed of both theists and atheists. Points of discussion included atheism and evolution. While Sapient contended during his arguments that Comfort violated the rules by talking about the Ten Commandments, Cameron later stated on The Way of the Master Radio that the rules of the debate did not say that the Bible could never be referenced, but rather that Comfort simply had to come up with one argument that did not reference the Bible or faith. During the debate, Cameron referred to the absence of a crocoduck to dispute the theory of evolution, which then became a meme to highlight misconceptions about the theory.

In November 2009, Cameron and others distributed free copies of an altered version of Charles Darwin's On the Origin of Species on college campuses in the United States. The book consisted of Darwin's text with chapters of the book removed, and with an added introduction by Comfort reiterating common creationist assertions about Darwin and evolution. The book was criticized by scientists and Darwin's biographers who criticized the omission of key chapters of the book, and who stated that its introduction contains misinformation about Darwin, and long-refuted creationist arguments about the science of evolution, such as the linking of Nazi racial theories to Darwinist ideas. Comfort later said that the four chapters were chosen at random to be omitted in order to make the book small enough to be affordable as a giveaway, with the absent chapters available for download, but that the missing chapters were included in the second edition, which had a smaller text size that made printing the entire book as a giveaway affordable. The second edition still lacks Darwin's preface and glossary of terms. The National Center for Science Education arranged a campaign to distribute an analysis of the Comfort introduction and a banana bookmark at colleges across the United States, a reference to Comfort's presentation of the banana as evidence for the existence of God.

For many years, Cameron warned that sinners would be tormented in Hell. In December 2025, Cameron announced his updated view that non-Christians who die will instead be destroyed to nonexistence, a belief known as annihilationism.

== Political views ==
=== LGBT rights ===
On March 2, 2012, Cameron stated on CNN's Piers Morgan Tonight, when asked about homosexuality, that it is "unnatural, it's detrimental and ultimately destructive to so many of the foundations of civilization". Cameron's comments received criticism from GLAAD, and provoked a backlash from gay rights activists and Hollywood celebrities, including Roseanne Barr, Craig Ferguson, Jesse Tyler Ferguson, as well as Growing Pains co-stars, Tracey Gold and Alan Thicke. Piers Morgan stated that Cameron was brave for expressing his opinion, "however antiquated his beliefs may be". He, however, received "thousands of emails and comments" from supporters. Rosie O'Donnell invited him to discuss his views on her talk show, but he declined and suggested a private dinner to discuss this topic personally.

=== Donald Trump ===
Cameron is an outspoken social conservative. He supported Donald Trump in the 2016 presidential election, saying, "There are clearly enemies of Christian principles and Christianity [and] I don't think Trump is one of them."

=== COVID-19 ===
In 2020, Cameron said that such things as COVID-19 could be used by God to bring about his purposes and that he had suspicions – without specifying what they were – about how COVID-19 got started. He also opposed the designation of churchgoing and extended family Thanksgiving celebrations as nonessential, a measure implemented to slow the spread of the COVID-19 pandemic, saying, "Socialism and communism are knocking on our doors [...] disguised in the costumes of public health and social justice."

As record-breaking levels of COVID-19 infections in December 2020 overwhelmed hospitals, including in Southern California, Cameron organized at least two gatherings of dozens of people for maskless Christmas caroling protests against enhanced restrictions to combat the second wave of the pandemic. The events, which were lawful, were held outside, in venues such as a mall parking lot in Ventura County, part of the Southern California Region, a group of counties under a state-mandated stay-home order triggered by low ICU capacity. Barbara Ferrer, Los Angeles County Public Health Director, denounced Cameron's decision to hold large gatherings as "very irresponsible and very dangerous." Cameron responded to criticism of this by stating that the psychological harm of the COVID-19 lockdowns could be worse than the coronavirus itself. Cameron also held an outdoor maskless New Year's Eve event in Malibu, despite a request by state senator Henry Stern that he should stay home.

== Personal life ==
Cameron married fellow Growing Pains star Chelsea Noble at Our Lady Help of Christians Chapel in Cheektowaga, New York, on July 21, 1991. They have six children: four adopted and two biological. With his wife, Cameron founded The Firefly Foundation, which runs Camp Firefly. In 2024, Cameron moved with his family from California to Tennessee.

== Filmography ==
=== Television ===
Year	Title	Role	Notes
1981	Goliath Awaits	Liam	Television movie
1981	Bret Maverick	Boy #1	Episodes: "The Lazy Ace" (Parts 1 & 2)
1982	Beyond Witch Mountain	Boy	Television movie
1982	Herbie, the Love Bug	Young Kid	Episode: "Herbie the Matchmaker"
1982	Lou Grant	Joey	Episode: "Victims"
1983	Starflight: The Plane That Couldn't Land	Gary	Television movie
1983	Two Marriages	Eric Armstrong	Episode: "Relativity"
1983	ABC Afterschool Special	Willy; Jeff	Episodes: "The Woman Who Willed a Miracle" & "Andrea's Story: A Hitchhiking Tragedy"
1984	More Than Murder	Bobby	Television movie
1984	Children in the Crossfire	Mickey Chandler	Television movie
1985–1992	Growing Pains	Mike Seaver	167 episodes
1988	Full House	Cousin Steve	Episode: "Just One of the Guys"
1990	The Secrets of the Back to the Future Trilogy	Himself (host)	Behind-the-scenes show
1991	A Little Piece of Heaven	Will Loomis	Television movie
1994	Star Struck	Runner	Television movie
1995	The Computer Wore Tennis Shoes	Dexter Riley	Television movie
1995–1996	Kirk	Kirk Hartman	31 episodes
1998	You Lucky Dog	Jack Morgan	Television movie
2000	The Growing Pains Movie	Mike Seaver	Television movie
2001	Touched by an Angel	Chuck Parker	Episode: "The Birthday Present"
2001	The Miracle of the Cards	Josh	Television movie
2002	Family Law	Mitchell Stark	Episode: "Blood and Water"
2003–2013	Praise the Lord	Guest host	Recurring
2003–present	The Way of the Master	Himself (host)	—
2004	Growing Pains: Return of the Seavers	Mike Seaver	Television movie
2019	One on One with Kirk Cameron	Himself	—
2019	Fuller House	Himself	—
2021–present	Takeaways with Kirk Cameron	Himself (host)	Christian talk show
2024	Adventures with Iggy and Mr. Kirk	Himself (host)	Crowdfunded television show

=== Films ===
Year	Title	Role	Notes
1986	The Best of Times	Teddy	—
1987	Like Father Like Son	Chris Hammond / Dr. Jack Hammond	—
1988	Straight at Ya'	Himself	Alcohol/drug guidance video
1989	Listen to Me	Tucker Muldowney	—
1990	The Willies	Mike Seaver	—
1998	The Birth of Jesus	Uncle Kirk	Direct-to-video
2001	Left Behind: The Movie	Buck Williams	—
2002	Left Behind II: Tribulation Force	Buck Williams	—
2005	Left Behind: World at War	Buck Williams	—
2008	Fireproof	Caleb Holt	—
2012	Monumental: In Search of America's National Treasure	Himself	Documentary; also producer
2013	Unstoppable	Himself	Documentary
2014	Mercy Rule	John Miller	Direct-to-video and digital download
2014	Saving Christmas	Kirk	Limited theatrical release
2017	Extraordinary	Barry	—
2018	Connect	Himself	—
2022	The Homeschool Awakening	Himself	Documentary, two-night theatrical release
2022	Lifemark	Jimmy Scotton	Distributed via Fathom Events

=== Video games ===
Year	Title	Role
1994	The Horde	Chauncey

== Awards and nominations ==
Year	Association	Category	Work	Result	Ref.
1985	Young Artist Awards	Best Young Supporting Actor in a Daytime or Nighttime Drama	Two Marriages	Nominated	
1986	Young Artist Awards	Best Young Actor Starring in a New Television Series	Growing Pains	Won	
1987	Young Artist Awards	Exceptional Performance by a Young Actor Starring in a Television Comedy or Drama Series	Growing Pains	Won	
1987	Young Artist Awards	Best Young Male Superstar in Television	Growing Pains	Won	
1987	Saturn Awards	Best Performance by a Younger Actor	Like Father, Like Son	Won	
1987	Golden Globe Awards	Best Supporting Actor – Series, Miniseries or Television Film	Growing Pains	Nominated	
1988	People's Choice Awards	Favorite Young TV Performer		Won	
1989	Young Artist Awards	Best Young Actor Starring in a Motion Picture	Listen to Me	Nominated	
1989	Golden Globe Awards	Best Supporting Actor – Series, Miniseries or Television Film	Growing Pains	Nominated	
1989	People's Choice Awards	Favorite Young TV Performer		Won	
1990	Kids' Choice Awards	Favorite TV Actor	Growing Pains	Won	
1991	Kids' Choice Awards	Favorite TV Actor	Growing Pains	Nominated	
2012	Indiana Wesleyan University	Society of World Changers		Won	
2015	Golden Raspberry Awards	Worst Actor	Saving Christmas	Won	
2015	Golden Raspberry Awards	Worst Screen Combo (shared with "his ego")	Saving Christmas	Won	
2024	Patriot Awards	Fox Nation Culture Warrior Award		Won	

== Bibliography ==
- Still Growing: An Autobiography (2008, with Lissa Halls Johnson): ISBN 0-8307-4451-7
- As You Grow (2022, published by Brave Books and illustrated by Juan Moreno): ISBN 1-9555-5029-8
- Pride Comes Before the Fall (2023, Brave Books, illustrated by Steve Crespo): ISBN 978-1955550390
