= 1996 in film =

The year 1996 involved many significant films. The major releases this year included Scream, Fargo, Trainspotting, The Rock, The English Patient, Twister, Space Jam, Mission: Impossible, Mars Attacks!, Jerry Maguire and a film version of the musical Evita. The year also featured Roland Emmerich's top grossing Independence Day.

== Highest-grossing films ==
The top 10 films released in 1996 by worldwide gross are as follows:

Highest-grossing films of 1996
Rank	Title	Distributor	Worldwide gross
1	Independence Day	20th Century Fox	$817,400,891
2	Twister	Warner Bros. / Universal	$499,230,797
3	Mission: Impossible	Paramount	$457,696,359
4	The Rock	Buena Vista	$335,062,621
5	The Hunchback of Notre Dame	Buena Vista	$325,338,851
6	101 Dalmatians	Buena Vista	$320,689,294
7	Ransom	Buena Vista	$309,492,681
8	The Nutty Professor	Universal	$273,961,019
9	Jerry Maguire	Sony / TriStar	$273,552,592
10	Space Jam	Warner Bros.	$250,180,384

=== Box office records ===
- Independence Day became the highest-grossing film of Will Smith's career, up until it was surpassed by Aladdin (2019) which grossed $1.054 billion. However, adjusting for inflation, Independence Day in 2019 grossed $1.324 billion.
- Rumble in the Bronx was released in North America, becoming Jackie Chan's first major box office hit in the region, with its US box office alone earning over 20 times its budget. It was Chan's biggest ever hit up until then.

=== Context ===
The theatrical year of 1996 achieved a $5.8 billion domestic gross milestone and saw a record twelve films earning over $100 million by the end of December, with Independence Day earning over $300 million. However, the film industry experienced a surplus of releases between 1995 and 1996 that resulted in several box office flops, studio bankruptcies and sales, and otherwise successful films struggling to turn in a profit. The average cost of producing and marketing film rose to $60 million, a 20% increase from the previous year, with a contributing factor being the record high-salaries for stars such as Sylvester Stallone, Tom Cruise, Arnold Schwarzenegger, Mel Gibson, Jim Carrey, Harrison Ford, Michael Douglas, Sharon Stone, Julia Roberts, and Demi Moore that became the subject of industry scrutiny following several high profile flops that were released in between 1995 and 1996. This resulted in studios having to cut their film slate by fifty percent to offset growing production and marketing costs and ensure more profits.

== Events ==
- January 22 - The first Critics' Choice Awards ceremony was held.
- June 19 – The Hunchback of Notre Dame has one of the largest premieres for a motion picture, taking place at the Superdome in New Orleans, with an audience of 65,000 people, as well as free admission. The film received generally positive reviews, and was a commercial success in box-office revenue.
- July 10 – Nickelodeon releases its first feature film, Harriet the Spy, a spy-comedy-drama film based on the 1964 novel of the same name. It also launches the career of then-child actress Michelle Trachtenberg.
- Mid-July – Production begins on Titanic.
- September 20 – 75-year-old English actor Sir Dirk Bogarde has a severe stroke. He continued to need a wheelchair until his death in 1999.
- December 20 – Scream is released and after a slow start becomes a surprising box office hit, ultimately earning more than $100 million domestic sales. Hailed as an influential landmark in the horror genre, it revitalized the declining slasher genre by satirizing the subgenre with characters that are well-versed in its clichés. Scream’s success lead to studios capitalizing especially on marketing horror films towards the teenage and young adult demographic.

=== Award ceremonies ===
- 1st Empire Awards

== Awards ==
Category/Organization	54th Golden Globe Awards January 19, 1997		2nd Critics' Choice Awards January 20, 1997	Producers, Directors, Screen Actors, and Writers Guild Awards	69th Academy Awards March 24, 1997	50th BAFTA Awards April 29, 1997
Category/Organization	Drama	Musical or Comedy	2nd Critics' Choice Awards January 20, 1997	Producers, Directors, Screen Actors, and Writers Guild Awards	69th Academy Awards March 24, 1997	50th BAFTA Awards April 29, 1997
Best Film	The English Patient	Evita	Fargo	The English Patient		
Best Director	Miloš Forman; The People vs. Larry Flynt		Anthony Minghella; The English Patient			Joel Coen; Fargo
Best Actor	Geoffrey Rush; Shine	Tom Cruise; Jerry Maguire	Geoffrey Rush; Shine			
Best Actress	Brenda Blethyn; Secrets & Lies	Madonna; Evita	Frances McDormand; Fargo			Brenda Blethyn; Secrets & Lies
Best Supporting Actor	Edward Norton; Primal Fear		Cuba Gooding, Jr. Jerry Maguire			Paul Scofield; The Crucible
Best Supporting Actress	Lauren Bacall; The Mirror Has Two Faces		Joan Allen; The Crucible	Lauren Bacall; The Mirror Has Two Faces	Juliette Binoche; The English Patient	
Best Screenplay, Adapted	Scott Alexander and Larry Karaszewski; The People vs. Larry Flynt		Anthony Minghella; The English Patient	Billy Bob Thornton; Sling Blade		Anthony Minghella; The English Patient
Best Screenplay, Original	Scott Alexander and Larry Karaszewski; The People vs. Larry Flynt		Anthony Minghella; The English Patient	Joel and Ethan Coen; Fargo		Mike Leigh; Secrets & Lies
Best Original Score	The English Patient; Gabriel Yared		N/A	N/A	The English Patient; Gabriel Yared	
Best Original Song	"You Must Love Me"; Evita		N/A	N/A	"You Must Love Me"; Evita	N/A
Best Foreign Language Film	Kolya		Ridicule	N/A	Kolya	Ridicule

Palme d'Or (Cannes Film Festival):

Secrets & Lies, directed by Mike Leigh, United Kingdom

Golden Lion (Venice Film Festival):

Michael Collins, directed by Neil Jordan, Ireland / United Kingdom

Golden Bear (Berlin Film Festival):

Sense and Sensibility, directed by Ang Lee, United States

People's Choice Award (Toronto International Film Festival):

Shine, directed by Scott Hicks, Australia

== 1996 films ==
=== By country/region ===
- List of American films of 1996
- List of Argentine films of 1996
- List of Australian films of 1996
- List of Bangladeshi films of 1996
- List of British films of 1996
- List of Canadian films of 1996
- List of French films of 1996
- List of Hong Kong films of 1996
- List of Indian films of 1996
  - List of Hindi films of 1996
  - List of Kannada films of 1996
  - List of Malayalam films of 1996
  - List of Marathi films of 1996
  - List of Tamil films of 1996
  - List of Telugu films of 1996
- List of Japanese films of 1996
- List of Mexican films of 1996
- List of Pakistani films of 1996
- List of Russian films of 1996
- List of South Korean films of 1996
- List of Spanish films of 1996

=== By genre/medium ===
- List of action films of 1996
- List of animated feature films of 1996
- List of avant-garde films of 1996
- List of crime films of 1996
- List of comedy films of 1996
- List of drama films of 1996
- List of horror films of 1996
- List of science fiction films of 1996
- List of thriller films of 1996
- List of western films of 1996

== Births ==
- January 1 – Lydia Peckham, New Zealand actress
- January 3 – Florence Pugh, English actress
- January 4 – Emma Mackey, English-French actress
- January 5 – Maxim Baldry, English actor
- January 6 – Courtney Eaton, Australian actress
- January 15 – Dove Cameron, American actress
- January 16 – Brandon Walters, Indigenous Australian actor
- January 21 – Jorge Lendeborg Jr., Dominican-American actor
- January 25 – Tati Gabrielle, American actress
- January 27 – Braeden Lemasters, American actor, musician and singer
- January 29 – Bryn Apprill, American voice actress
- January 31 – Joel Courtney, American actor
- February 2 – Paul Mescal, Irish actor
- February 7
  - David Castro, American actor
  - Ruby O. Fee, German actress
  - Jake Goldberg, American actor
- February 9
  - Jimmy Bennett, American actor
  - Kelli Berglund, American actress
- February 16
  - Alex Aiono, American actor
  - Nana Komatsu, Japanese actress
- February 17 – Sasha Pieterse, American actress
- February 21 – Sophie Turner, English actress
- February 24 – Mana Kinjo, Japanese actress and model (d. 2020)
- February 28 – Bobb'e J. Thompson, American actor
- March 1 – Jackson White, American actor
- March 5 – Taylor Hill, American model and actress
- March 6 – Dillon Freasier, American former actor
- March 10 - Mia Rose Frampton, American actress
- March 16
  - Ajiona Alexus, American actress and singer
- March 18
  - Madeline Carroll, American actress
  - Eva Noblezada, American actress and singer
- March 21 – Han Ji-hyun, South Korean actress
- March 22
  - Jonathan Mason, English actor
  - Izzy Meikle-Small, English actress
- March 26 – Harrison Houde, Canadian actor, producer, director, YouTuber and musician
- March 31 – Liza Koshy, American media personality and actress
- April 1 - Samuel Blenkin, English actor
- April 6 - Myha'la, American actress
- April 14
  - Abigail Breslin, American actress
  - Abby Quinn, American actress
- April 16 – Anya Taylor-Joy, American-English actress
- April 17 – Dee Dee Davis, American actress
- April 23 – Charlie Rowe, English actor
- April 28 – Tony Revolori, American actor
- April 29 – Katherine Langford, Australian actress
- May 5 – Mark McKenna, Irish actor, singer-songwriter and producer
- May 6 – Dominic Scott Kay, American actor and singer
- May 9
  - Noah Centineo, American actor
  - Mary Mouser, American actress
- May 16 – Aleyse Shannon, American actress
- May 17 – Ryan Ochoa, American actor, rapper, songwriter and producer
- May 21 – Sang Heon Lee, South Korean actor
- June 1 – Tom Holland, English actor
- June 2 – Brittany O'Grady, American Actress
- June 4 – Maria Bakalova, Bulgarian actress
- June 13 – Kodi Smit-McPhee, Australian actor
- June 20 – Claudia Lee, American actress and singer
- June 24 – Harris Dickinson, English actor
- June 25 – Lele Pons, Venezuelan-American actress
- July 9 – Meg DeLacy, American actress and singer
- July 11 – Alessia Cara, Canadian singer-songwriter and actress
- July 16 – Nicky Jones, American actor
- July 17 – Grace Caroline Currey, American actress
- July 22 – Skyler Gisondo, American actor
- July 23 – Rachel G. Fox, American actress
- July 24 – Herizen Guardiola, American singer, songwriter, and actress
- July 25 – Jaafar Jackson, American actor and singer
- July 27 – Ashlyn Sanchez, American former child actress
- July 30 – Jacob Lofland, American actor
- August 1 – Cymphonique Miller, American actress and singer
- August 2 – Kansas Bowling, American actress, director, screenwriter and cinematographer
- August 7 – Liam James, Canadian actor
- August 9 – Céline Buckens, Belgian-British actress
- August 10 – Jacob Latimore, American actor and singer
- August 14 – Brianna Hildebrand, American actress
- August 21 – Jamia Simone Nash, American actress
- August 29 – Linden Porco, Canadian actor
- September 1 – Zendaya, American actress and singer
- September 2 – Austin Abrams, American actor
- September 3 – Joy, South Korean singer, actress and host
- September 12 – Colin Ford, American actor
- September 13 – Lili Reinhart, American actress
- September 14 – Leo Woodall, English actor
- September 15 – Jake Cherry, American actor
- September 16 – Ryusei Yokohama, Japanese actor
- September 17 – Ella Purnell, English actress
- September 18 – C.J. Sanders, American former child actor
- September 19
  - Stéphane Bak, French actor and comedian
  - Connor Swindells, English actor and model
- September 30 – Lurie Poston, American actor and singer
- October 4 – Ella Balinska, English actress
- October 5 – Mary Gibbs, American actress
- October 6 – Raff Law, English actor
- October 9
  - Jacob Batalon, American actor
  - Samuel Honywood, English former teen actor
- October 12 – Vitória Strada, Brazilian actress and model
- October 18 – Nadji Jeter, American actor
- October 19 – Chance Perdomo, British-American actor (d. 2024)
- October 25 – Keean Johnson, American actor
- October 26 – Harry Lawtey, British actor
- October 27 – Samantha Logan, American actress
- October 28
  - Jasmine Jessica Anthony, American actress
  - Laine MacNeil, Canadian actress
- October 29
  - C. J. Wallace, American actor
  - Victoria Konefal, American actress
- October 30 – Kennedy McMann, American actress
- November 1 – Daniela Melchior, Portuguese actress
- November 2 - Clara Rosager, Danish actress
- November 7 – Lorde, New Zealand singer
- November 9 – Kevin Afghani, American voice actor
- November 11 – Tye Sheridan, American actor
- November 13 – Otto Farrant, English actor
- November 14 – Mason Gooding, American actor
- November 16 – Mackenyu, Japanese actor
- November 18
  - Josh Heuston, Australian actor
  - Noah Ringer, American former child actor
- November 21 – Grace Van Patten, American actress
- November 22 – Madison Davenport, American actress and singer
- November 26 – Thea Sofie Loch Næss, Norwegian actress
- December 1 – Destry Spielberg, American director and actress
- December 6 – Stefanie Scott, American actress
- December 7 – Marisa Abela, English actress
- December 8 – Teala Dunn, American actress
- December 9 – Leah Lewis, American actress and singer
- December 11
  - Jack Griffo, American actor
  - Hailee Steinfeld, American actress
- December 12 – Lucas Hedges, American actor
- December 14 – Barbie Ferreira, American actress
- December 21 – Kaitlyn Dever, American actress
- December 27 – Jae Head, American actor
- December 29 – Dylan Minnette, American actor

== Deaths ==
Month	Date	Name	Age	Country	Profession	Notable films
January	1	John Rodney	81	US	Actor	Key Largo; Pursued
January	1	Virgil W. Vogel	76	US	Director, Film Editor	The Mole People; Touch of Evil
January	7	William H. Clothier	92	US	Cinematographer	The Man Who Shot Liberty Valance; The Alamo
January	7	Aaron Stell	84	US	Film Editor	To Kill a Mockingbird; Silent Running
January	10	Al Silvani	85	US	Actor	Rocky; The Gauntlet
January	13	Mark Herron	67	US	Actor	8½; Girl in Gold Boots
January	15	Les Baxter	73	US	Composer	The Pit and the Pendulum; Beach Blanket Bingo
January	17	Harry Robertson	63	UK	Composer	The Vampire Lovers; Twins of Evil
January	19	Don Simpson	52	US	Producer	Top Gun; Bad Boys
January	20	Lo Wei	77	China	Director, Screenwriter, Actor	The Big Boss; Fist of Fury
January	21	Jordan Christopher	55	US	Actor, Singer	Return of the Seven; Brainstorm
January	29	Jamie Uys	74	South Africa	Director	The Gods Must Be Crazy; Animals Are Beautiful People
January	30	Guy Doleman	72	New Zealand	Actor	Dial M for Murder; Thunderball
February	2	Shamus Culhane	87	US	Animator	Snow White and the Seven Dwarfs; Pinocchio
February	2	Gene Kelly	83	US	Actor, Director	Singin' in the Rain; An American in Paris
February	2	Aline Towne	76	US	Actress	Send Me No Flowers; Mirage
February	3	Audrey Meadows	73	US	Actress	That Touch of Mink; Take Her, She's Mine
February	6	Guy Madison	74	US	Actor	5 Against the House; Jet Over the Atlantic
February	6	Patsy Smart	77	UK	Actress	The Elephant Man; The Pink Panther Strikes Again
February	11	William F. Claxton	81	US	Director	Night of the Lepus; Desire in the Dust
February	13	Martin Balsam	76	US	Actor	Psycho; 12 Angry Men
February	13	Scott Beach	65	US	Actor	Stand by Me; Mrs. Doubtfire
February	15	Tommy Rettig	54	US	Actor	River of No Return; The 5,000 Fingers of Dr. T.
February	15	McLean Stevenson	68	US	Actor	The Cat from Outer Space; The Christian Licorice Store
February	16	Roger Bowen	63	US	Actor	M*A*S*H; What About Bob?
February	17	Evelyn Laye	95	UK	Actress	Theatre of Death; Princess Charming
February	19	Brenda Bruce	76	UK	Actress	Peeping Tom; Splitting Heirs
February	20	Tōru Takemitsu	65	Japan	Composer	Harakiri; Ran
February	23	Elisa Cegani	84	Italy	Actress	Eleonora Duse; Lucky to Be a Woman
February	25	Haing S. Ngor	55	Cambodia	Actor	The Killing Fields; My Life
March	2	Lyle Talbot	94	US	Actor	20,000 Years in Sing Sing; Plan 9 from Outer Space
March	3	Marguerite Duras	81	France	Director, Screenwriter	Hiroshima mon amour; The Lorry
March	4	Whit Bissell	86	US	Actor	Hud; The Magnificent Seven
March	6	Simon Cadell	45	UK	Actor	Watership Down; Meteor
March	6	Tom McDermott	83	US	Actor	Ghostbusters; The Crucible
March	9	George Burns	100	US	Actor, Comedian	Oh, God!; The Sunshine Boys
March	10	Marc de Jonge	47	France	Actor	Rambo III; Empire of the Sun
March	10	Ross Hunter	75	US	Producer	Airport; Pillow Talk
March	11	Vince Edwards	67	US	Actor	The Killing; The Devil's Brigade
March	13	Lucio Fulci	68	Italy	Director, Screenwriter, Actor	Zombi 2; City of the Living Dead
March	13	Krzysztof Kieślowski	55	Poland	Director, Screenwriter	Three Colours; The Double Life of Veronique
March	16	Charlie Barnett	41	US	Actor, Comedian	D.C. Cab; Nobody's Fool
March	17	René Clément	82	France	Director, Screenwriter	Purple Noon; Forbidden Games
March	24	Liam O'Brien	83	US	Screenwriter	Trapeze; The Devil at 4 O'Clock
March	28	Barbara McLean	92	US	Film Editor	All About Eve; Twelve O'Clock High
April	3	Herk Harvey	71	US	Director	Carnival of Souls
April	5	Charlene Holt	67	US	Actress	El Dorado; Man's Favorite Sport?
April	5	Norman Rockett	84	US	Set Decorator	Planet of the Apes; Tora! Tora! Tora!
April	6	Greer Garson	91	UK	Actress	Mrs. Miniver; Goodbye, Mr. Chips
April	7	Georges Géret	71	France	Actor	Z; Diary of a Chambermaid
April	8	John Hudson	77	US	Actor	The Screaming Skull; Gunfight at the O.K. Corral
April	8	Ben Johnson	77	US	Actor	The Last Picture Show; The Wild Bunch
April	9	Paul Leder	70	US	Director, Screenwriter	Ape; I Dismember Mama
April	11	Wanda McKay	80	US	Actress	Jungle Goddess; One Thrilling Night
April	16	Lucille Bremer	79	US	Actress	Meet Me in St. Louis; Ziegfeld Follies
April	16	Irasema Dilián	71	Brazil	Actress	Malombra; Wuthering Heights
April	17	Tomás Gutiérrez Alea	67	Cuba	Director, Screenwriter	Strawberry and Chocolate; Memories of Underdevelopment
April	20	Alexander D'Arcy	87	Egypt	Actor	The Awful Truth; How to Marry a Millionaire
April	21	Luigi Pistilli	66	Italy	Actor	The Good, the Bad and the Ugly; For a Few Dollars More
April	24	Donald Cammell	62	UK	Director, Screenwriter	Performance; Demon Seed
April	24	Preston Lockwood	83	UK	Actor	Time Bandits; High Spirits
April	25	Saul Bass	75	US	Title Designer	Psycho; Goodfellas
April	25	Dick Wesson	73	US	Actor	Destination Moon; Calamity Jane
April	26	Stirling Silliphant	78	US	Screenwriter	In the Heat of the Night; The Poseidon Adventure
April	27	Adam Roarke	58	US	Actor	Dirty Mary, Crazy Larry; The Stunt Man
April	27	Joan Sterndale-Bennett	82	UK	Actress	Brighton Rock; We Dive at Dawn
April	30	David Opatoshu	78	US	Actor	Torn Curtain; Exodus
May	1	Luana Patten	57	US	Actress	Song of the South; Home from the Hill
May	2	Danny Kamekona	60	US	Actor	The Karate Kid Part II; Robot Jox
May	3	Jack Weston	71	US	Actor	The Thomas Crown Affair; Wait Until Dark
May	16	Barton Heyman	59	US	Actor	The Exorcist; Raising Cain
May	19	Margaret Rawlings	89	Japan	Actress	Roman Holiday; Twist of Fate
May	20	Dean Harens	75	US	Actor	Christmas Holiday; Rosie!
May	20	Jon Pertwee	76	UK	Actor	A Funny Thing Happened on the Way to the Forum; Carry On Screaming!
May	21	Lash LaRue	78	US	Actor	Song of Old Wyoming; Law of the Lash
May	23	Patrick Cargill	77	UK	Actor	Father, Dear Father; Help!
May	24	John Abbott	90	UK	Actor	Gigi; Deception
May	24	Norman René	45	US	Director	Longtime Companion; Prelude to a Kiss
May	24	Roland Varno	88	US	Actor	My Name Is Julia Ross; The Blue Angel
May	29	Jennings Lang	81	US	Producer	High Plains Drifter; Earthquake
May	29	Jeremy Sinden	45	UK	Actor	Star Wars; Chariots of Fire
May	29	Tamara Toumanova	77	Russia	Dancer, Actress	Invitation to the Dance; Torn Curtain
May	30	Natividad Vacío	83	US	Actor	The Magnificent Seven; The Man with Two Brains
June	1	Michael Fox	75	US	Actor	What Ever Happened to Baby Jane?; The Longest Yard
June	2	John Alton	94	Hungary	Cinematographer	An American in Paris; Father of the Bride
June	3	Veniero Colasanti	85	Italy	Costume Designer, Production Designer	El Cid; The Fall of the Roman Empire
June	3	Peter Glenville	82	UK	Director	Becket; The Comedians
June	5	Vito Scotti	78	US	Actor	The Godfather; Cactus Flower
June	6	Mary Lee	71	US	Actress	Nancy Drew... Reporter; Cowboy and the Senorita
June	7	Saul David	74	US	Producer	Logan's Run; Fantastic Voyage
June	7	Max Factor, Jr.	91	US	Makeup Artist	The Wizard of Oz; The Ten Commandments
June	10	Jo Van Fleet	81	US	Actress	East of Eden; Cool Hand Luke
June	11	Lonne Elder III	68	US	Screenwriter	Sounder; Melinda
June	11	Brigitte Helm	90	Germany	Actress	Metropolis; L'Argent
June	12	Mary Field	87	US	Actress	Ball of Fire; Life with Father
June	12	Lillian Yarbo	91	US	Actress	Wives Under Suspicion; You Can't Take It With You
June	15	Ella Fitzgerald	79	US	Singer, Actress	Pete Kelly's Blues; Ride 'Em Cowboy
June	23	Pasqualino De Santis	69	Italy	Cinematographer	Romeo and Juliet; A Special Day
June	27	Albert R. Broccoli	87	US	Producer	James Bond; Chitty Chitty Bang Bang
July	1	Harold Greenberg	66	Canada	Producer	Porky's; The Little Girl Who Lives Down the Lane
July	1	Margaux Hemingway	42	US	Actress	Lipstick; Over the Brooklyn Bridge
July	1	Steve Tesich	53	Serbia	Screenwriter	Breaking Away; Eyewitness
July	8	Irene Prador	84	Austria	Actress	The Battle of the River Plate; To the Devil a Daughter
July	9	Christopher Casson	84	UK	Actor	Zardoz; Educating Rita
July	10	Paul King	69	US	Screenwriter	Operation Petticoat; Wild Heritage
July	13	Pandro S. Berman	91	US	Producer	Father of the Bride; Top Hat
July	13	Loda Halama	84	Poland	Dancer, Actress	Prokurator Alicja Horn; A Diplomatic Wife
July	15	Dana Hill	32	US	Actress	National Lampoon's European Vacation; Cross Creek
July	20	Randy Stuart	71	US	Actress	All About Eve; The Incredible Shrinking Man
July	21	Luana Anders	58	US	Actress	The Pit and the Pendulum; Dementia 13
July	21	Herb Edelman	62	US	Actor	The Odd Couple; California Suite
July	21	Wolfe Morris	71	UK	Actor	Ill Met by Moonlight; The House That Dripped Blood
July	23	Jean Muir	85	US	Actress	And One Was Beautiful; The Outcasts of Poker Flat
July	24	Virginia Christine	76	US	Actress	Guess Who's Coming to Dinner; Judgment at Nuremberg
July	28	Bryant Haliday	68	US	Actor	The Projected Man; Tower of Evil
July	29	Hilary Pritchard	53	Isle of Man	Actress	A Touch of the Sun; Under the Doctor
July	30	Claudette Colbert	92	France	Actress	It Happened One Night; Since You Went Away
July	30	Anthony Peck	49	US	Actor	The Hunt for Red October; Die Hard with a Vengeance
July	30	Magda Schneider	87	Germany	Actress	Tell Me Tonight; Sissi
August	3	Guido Alberti	86	Italy	Actor	8½; Saving Grace
August	11	Charles McGregor	73	US	Actor	Blazing Saddles; Super Fly
August	14	Bob Hannah	57	US	Actor	Driving Miss Daisy; The Prince of Tides
August	14	Camilla Horn	93	Germany	Actress	Faust; Tempest
August	15	Joe Seneca	77	US	Actor	Crossroads; The Verdict
August	16	Miles Goodman	46	US	Composer	Little Shop of Horrors; What About Bob?
August	27	Greg Morris	62	US	Actor	The Sword of Ali Baba; Countdown at Kusini
August	30	Christine Pascal	42	France	Actress, Director, Screenwriter	Le Petit Prince a dit; Round Midnight
September	4	Victor Aaron	39	US	Actor	Bulletproof; Geronimo: An American Legend
September	5	Anthony Mendleson	81	UK	Costume Designer	A Bridge Too Far; Krull
September	6	Salman Shah	24	Bangladesh	Actor	Keyamat Theke Keyamat; Sujan Sakhi
September	7	Bibi Besch	56	Austria	Actress	Star Trek II: The Wrath of Khan; Steel Magnolias
September	7	Joseph F. Biroc	93	US	Cinematographer	It's a Wonderful Life; Airplane!
September	9	Ruggero Mastroianni	66	Italy	Film Editor	Death in Venice; Amarcord
September	10	Joanne Dru	74	US	Actress	All the King's Men; She Wore a Yellow Ribbon
September	11	Brenda Forbes	87	UK	Actress	Mrs. Miniver; The White Cliffs of Dover
September	13	Jane Baxter	87	UK	Actress	Murder Will Out; Confidential Lady
September	13	Tupac Shakur	25	US	Rapper, Actor	Juice; Poetic Justice
September	14	Juliet Prowse	59	US	Actress, Dancer	G.I. Blues; Can-Can
September	16	Gene Nelson	76	US	Actor, Director	Oklahoma!; Kissin' Cousins
September	16	Joan Perry	85	US	Actress	Strange Alibi; Bullets for O'Hara
September	18	Annabella	89	France	Actress	Le Million; 13 Rue Madeleine
September	22	Dorothy Lamour	81	US	Actress, Singer	Road to Morocco; The Greatest Show on Earth
September	30	George Zuckerman	80	US	Screenwriter	Written on the Wind; The Tarnished Angels
October	4	Stephen J. Friedman	59	US	Producer	The Last Picture Show; Slap Shot
October	4	Masaki Kobayashi	80	Japan	Director	Harakiri; The Human Condition
October	5	Judith Allen	85	US	Actress	Telephone Operator; The Thundering Herd
October	6	Ted Bessell	61	US	Actor	Don't Drink the Water; Billie
October	8	Francis D. Lyon	91	US	Director, Film Editor	Body and Soul; The Oklahoman
October	8	William Prince	83	US	Actor	Network; Family Plot
October	9	Harvey Vernon	69	US	Actor	Teen Wolf; All of Me
October	12	Erik Blomberg	83	Finland	Cinematographer, Director, Screenwriter	The White Reindeer; The Stolen Death
October	13	Beryl Reid	77	UK	Actress	The Killing of Sister George; Joseph Andrews
October	14	Laura La Plante	91	US	Actress	Man of the Moment; Arizona
October	16	Jason Bernard	58	US	Actor	No Way Out; Liar Liar
October	27	Morey Amsterdam	87	US	Actor, Comedian	Machine-Gun Kelly; Muscle Beach Party
October	27	Harry Woolman	87	US	Stuntman, Special Effects Artist	The Sword and the Sorcerer; Laserblast
October	30	John Young	80	UK	Actor	Monty Python and the Holy Grail; Chariots of Fire
October	31	Marcel Carné	90	France	Director	Children of Paradise; Three Rooms in Manhattan
October	31	Arthur Peterson	83	US	Actor	Targets; At Long Last Love
November	12	Peter Leeds	79	US	Actor	The Last Time I Saw Paris; Love Me or Leave Me
November	13	June Gale	85	US	Actress	Hotel for Women; Rainbow's End
November	14	Virginia Cherrill	88	US	Actress	City Lights; Girls Demand Excitement
November	15	Lila Finn	86	US	Stuntwoman	Gone with the Wind; It's a Wonderful Life
November	20	Danny Dare	91	US	Choreographer, Producer	Holiday Inn; Road to Utopia
November	22	Stephanie Bachelor	84	US	Actress	Secrets of Scotland Yard; Lake Placid Serenade
November	22	Mark Lenard	72	US	Actor	Star Trek: The Motion Picture; Annie Hall
November	23	George Nicholas	85	US	Animator	Cinderella; Sleeping Beauty
November	26	Michael Bentine	74	UK	Actor, Screenwriter	Down Among the Z Men; The Sandwich Man
November	29	Jordan Cronenweth	61	US	Cinematographer	Blade Runner; Peggy Sue Got Married
December	4	Willard Parker	84	US	Actor	Lone Texan; Young Jesse James
December	7	Phillip Reed	88	US	Actor	The Bandit Queen; Take Me to Town
December	8	Paulene Myers	83	US	Actress	To Kill a Mockingbird; The Sting
December	8	Howard E. Rollins, Jr.	46	US	Actor	Ragtime; A Soldier's Story
December	8	Douglas Webb	74	UK	Still Photographer	Casino Royale; Krull
December	9	Diana Morgan	86	UK	Screenwriter	Went the Day Well?; A Run for Your Money
December	11	William Rushton	59	UK	Actor	Those Magnificent Men in their Flying Machines; Nothing but the Best
December	12	Larry Gates	81	US	Actor	In the Heat of the Night; Invasion of the Body Snatchers
December	19	Ronald Howard	78	UK	Actor	Murder, She Said; Come September
December	19	Marcello Mastroianni	72	Italy	Actor	8½; La Dolce Vita
December	28	Edward Carfagno	67	US	Art Director	Ben-Hur; Soylent Green
December	30	Lew Ayres	88	US	Actor, Director	All Quiet on the Western Front; Johnny Belinda
December	30	Jack Nance	53	US	Actor	Blue Velvet; Eraserhead
December	30	Keith Walker	61	US	Screenwriter, Actor	Free Willy; The Goonies
December	31	Wesley Addy	83	US	Actor	Network; The Verdict

== Film debuts ==
- Elena Anaya – África
- Wes Anderson (director) – Bottle Rocket
- Michael Angarano – Childhood's End
- Will Arnett – Close Up
- Carlos Bardem – Not Love, Just Frenzy
- Dee Bradley Baker – Space Jam
- Eric Balfour – Shattered Image
- Boyd Banks – Black Sheep
- Selma Blair – The Broccoli Theory
- Marc Blucas – Eddie
- Zlatko Burić – Pusher
- Bobby Cannavale – Night Falls on Manhattan
- Billy Crudup – Sleepers
- Viola Davis – The Substance of Fire
- Jamel Debbouze – Les Deux papas et la maman
- Drena De Niro – Grace of My Heart
- Clea DuVall – Little Witches
- Joel Edgerton – Race the Sun
- Aunjanue Ellis – Girls Town
- Anna Faris – Eden
- Joseph Fiennes – Stealing Beauty
- Ben Foster – Kounterfeit
- Laura Fraser – Small Faces
- Aimee Garcia – The Homecoming
- Ryan Gosling – Frankenstein and Me
- Olivier Gourmet – La Promesse
- Colin Hanks – That Thing You Do!
- Tom Hollander – Some Mother's Son
- Nicholas Hoult – Intimate Relations
- Rhys Ifans – August
- Eddie Izzard – The Secret Agent
- Mila Kunis – Santa with Muscles
- Kelly Macdonald – Trainspotting
- Heike Makatsch – Jailbirds
- Fele Martínez – Thesis
- Natascha McElhone – Surviving Picasso
- Kevin McKidd – Trainspotting
- Mads Mikkelsen – Pusher
- Radha Mitchell – Love and Other Catastrophes
- Gretchen Mol – Girl 6
- Joel David Moore – Foxfire
- Tracy Morgan – A Thin Line Between Love and Hate
- Emily Mortimer – The Ghost and the Darkness
- Edward Norton – Primal Fear
- Timothy Olyphant – The First Wives Club
- Patton Oswalt – Down Periscope
- Chris Parnell – Jingle All the Way
- Jaime Pressly – Mercenary
- Freddie Prinze, Jr. – To Gillian on Her 37th Birthday
- Missi Pyle – The Cottonwood
- Mary Lynn Rajskub – The Truth About Cats & Dogs
- Martin Roach – Extreme Measures
- Adam Scott – Hellraiser: Bloodline
- Tom Everett Scott – That Thing You Do!
- John Slattery – City Hall
- Octavia Spencer – A Time to Kill
- Julia Stiles – I Love You, I Love You Not
- Oleg Taktarov – Total Force
- David Tennant – Jude
- Justin Theroux – I Shot Andy Warhol
- Sam Trammell – Childhood's End
- Donnie Wahlberg – Bullet
- Emily Watson – Breaking the Waves
- Michael Kenneth Williams – Bullet
- Luke Wilson – Bottle Rocket
- Owen Wilson – Bottle Rocket
