= Deaths in April 1996 =

The following is a list of notable deaths in April 1996.

Entries for each day are listed alphabetically by surname. A typical entry lists information in the following sequence:

- Name, age, country of citizenship at birth, subsequent country of citizenship (if applicable), reason for notability, cause of death (if known), and reference.

== April 1996 ==
=== 1 ===
- Alexandru Diordiță, 84, Soviet/Moldovan politician.
- Alfredo Nobre da Costa, 72, Portuguese politician.
- Bob "Bones" Hamilton, 83, American college football player (Stanford Cardinal).
- Ray Keeling, 80, American football player (Philadelphia Eagles).
- Jean Le Moyne, 83, Canadian politician, member of the Senate of Canada (1982-1988).
- John McSherry, 51, American baseball umpire, heart attack.
- Léon Pétillon, 92, Belgian politician.
- Mário Viegas, 47, Portuguese actor and poetry reciter.
- Zoltán Zsitva, 90, Hungarian Olympic sprinter (1936).
- Masroor Anwar, 51, Indian poet, lyricist and screenwriter.
- Myroslav Dumanskyi, 66, Ukrainian football player.

=== 2 ===
- Jean Elizabeth Hampton, 41, American political philosopher and author.
- Lindsay Hartwig, 76, Australian politician.
- Ian Mitchell, 49, Scottish football player.
- Antonio Ortiz Ramírez, 88, Spanish anarcho-syndicalist and anarchist.
- Arthur Spaenhoven, 61, Belgian Olympic wrestler (1968).

=== 3 ===
- Ron Brown, 54, American government official, plane crash.
- Frank Doyle, 78, American comic book writer (Archie), cancer.
- Herk Harvey, 71, American actor and director, pancreatic cancer.
- Józef Marusarz, 70, Polish Olympic alpine skier (1948, 1952, 1956).
- Jo Privat, 76, French musician, cancer.
- Alphonse James Schladweiler, 93, American prelate of the Roman Catholic Church.
- Carl Stokes, 68, American politician and diplomat, esophageal cancer.

=== 4 ===
- Brian Abel-Smith, 69, British economist.
- Francis Barnard, 93, English cricketer.
- Barney Ewell, 78, American track and field athlete and Olympic champion (1948).
- Irma Haubold, 87, American Olympic gymnast (1936).
- Joy Newton, 82, ballet dancer and teacher.
- Zita Perczel, 77, Hungarian actress.
- Winifred Shotter, 91, British actress.

=== 5 ===
- Monika Dannemann, 50, German figure skater and painter, suicide.
- Gerry L'Estrange, 78, Irish politician.
- Frank "Nordy" Hoffman, 86, American college football player (Notre Dame Fighting Irish).
- Charlene Holt, 67, American actress (El Dorado).
- Jan Lipowski, 84, Polish Olympic alpine skier (1948).
- Jac Maris, 96, Dutch sculptor.
- Ahmed Mekkawi, 73, Egyptian Olympic football player (1948, 1952).
- Panayot Panayotov, 65, Bulgarian footballer and Olympian (1952, 1956).
- Herta Worell, 83, German actress.

=== 6 ===
- John D. Bulkeley, 84, United States Navy vice admiral and Medal of Honor recipient.
- Ester Carloni, 98, Italian actress.
- Greer Garson, 91, British-American actress (Mrs. Miniver, Blossoms in the Dust, Madame Curie), Oscar winner (1943), heart failure.
- Sterling M. McMurrin, 82, American theologian.
- Mehmet Oktav, 78-79, Turkish Olympic wrestler (1948).

=== 7 ===
- Colleen Clifford, 97, Australian actress.
- Georges Géret, 71, French film actor, cancer.
- Berkely Mather, 87, British writer.
- Yelena Mazanik, 82, Soviet/Belarus partisan who assassinated Nazi official Wilhelm Kube.

=== 8 ===
- Donald Adams, 67, English opera singer and actor, brain cancer.
- John Hudson, 77, American actor (Gunfight at the O.K. Corral, The Screaming Skull, G.I. Blues).
- George W. Jenkins, 88, American businessman and philanthropist.
- Ben Johnson, 77, American actor (The Last Picture Show, The Wild Bunch, The Sugarland Express), stuntman, and world-champion rodeo cowboy, Oscar winner (1972), heart attack.
- León Klimovsky, 89, Argentine film director, screenwriter and actor.
- Walter McGuffie, 79, British Olympic wrestler (1948).
- Petko Sirakov, 67, Bulgarian wrestler and Olympian (1956).
- Agron Sulaj, 44, Albanian football player and.
- José Valdivieso, 74, Argentine football player and manager.
- Petro Voinovsky, 82, Ukrainian nationalist.
- Mick Young, 59, Australian politician.

=== 9 ===
- Sandy Becker, 74, American announcer, actor, and comedian.
- Richard Condon, 81, American political novelist.
- Freddy Jensen, 70, Danish Olympic gymnast (1948, 1952).
- Paul Leder, 70, American actor and film director, lung cancer.
- Otto Licha, 83, Austrian Olympic handball player (1936).
- Armand Pagnoulle, 94, Belgian Olympic canoeist (1936).
- James Rouse, 81, American businessman and founder of The Rouse Company.

=== 10 ===
- Bud Annand, 62, Australian rules footballer.
- Moshe Davis, 80, American rabbi.
- Walter Harding, 79, American scholar and professor of English literature.
- Gunnar Konsmo, 73, Norwegian Olympic speed skater (1948).
- Herman Pines, 94, Russian-American chemist.
- Jack Wilkinson, 64, English football player.

=== 11 ===
- Billy Anderson, 55, American gridiron football player (Houston Oilers), ALS.
- Hans Beck, 84, Norwegian Olympic ski jumper (1932).
- Marcel Bleustein-Blanchet, 89, French businessman and publicist.
- Trygve Brodahl, 90, Norwegian cross country skier and Olympian (1936).
- Jessica Dubroff, 7, American trainee pilot, plane crash.
- Mel Hill, 82, Canadian ice hockey player (Boston Bruins, Brooklyn Americans, Toronto Maple Leafs).
- Wanda McKay, 80, American actor and model.

=== 12 ===
- Antonio Capua, 90, Italian politician.
- Helmut Krone, 70, American art director.
- Bob Landers, 55, Australian rugby league footballer.
- Marthe Robert, 82, French writer.
- Igor Ternov, 74, Russian physicist.

=== 13 ===
- C. Alfred "Chief" Anderson, 89, American aviator.
- Marguerite Bernes, 94, Algerian nun recognised as Righteous Among the Nations.
- George Mackay Brown, 74, Scottish poet, author and dramatist.
- James Burke, 64, American mobster and Lucchese crime family associate, lung cancer.
- D'Arcy Coulson, 88, Canadian ice hockey player (Philadelphia Quakers).
- Vjekoslav Kaleb, 90, Croatian writer.
- Denis Sargan, 71, British econometrician.

=== 14 ===
- Waleed Al-Salam, 69, Iraqi mathematician.
- Gaylord Birch, 50, American musician.
- Marie Clotilde Bonaparte, 84, French princess of the Bonaparte dynasty.
- William K. Everson, 67, American journalist, prostate cancer.
- Larry LaPrise, 83, American songwriter.
- Mervyn Levy, 82, Welsh artist and writer on art.
- George N. Neise, 79, American actor, cancer.
- James Sargent Russell, 93, United States Navy admiral.
- Einar Söderqvist, 74, Swedish Olympic hammer thrower (1948).
- Kōtetsuyama Toyoya, 53, Japanese sumo wrestler.
- Ed Zeniuk, 63, Canadian ice hockey player (Detroit Red Wings).

=== 15 ===
- Beatriz Costa, 88, Portuguese actress.
- Karl Etti, 83, Austrian composer.
- John C. Flanagan, 90, American psychologist.
- Arthur Lelyveld, 83, American rabbi and activist.
- Stavros Niarchos, 86, Greek businessman and art collector, pneumonia.
- Margit Pályi, 87, Hungarian Olympic gymnast (1928).

=== 16 ===
- George Abel, 80, Canadian ice hockey player and Olympic champion (1952).
- Tomás Gutiérrez Alea, 67, Cuban film director and screenwriter.
- François-Régis Bastide, 69, French writer, diplomat, politician, and radio host, lung cancer.
- Kelly Anne Bates, 17, English murder victim.
- Zoltán Berkes, 79, Hungarian Olympic field hockey player (1936).
- Nikolay Bobarenko, 65, Russian Olympic cyclist (1952).
- Lucille Bremer, 79, American actress and dancer, heart attack.
- Irasema Dilián, 71, Italian actress.
- Raymond Hill, 62, American tenor saxophonist, singer, and recording artist.
- Charlie Hillard, 58, American aerobatics pilot, aviation accident.
- Mogens Venge, 84, Danish Olympic field hockey player (1936, 1948).

=== 17 ===
- Paul Bleiß, 91, German politician and member of the Bundestag.
- Piet Hein, 90, Danish puzzle designer, mathematician, and poet.
- Adelaide Lambert, 88, American swimmer and Olympic champion (1928).
- Dudley Manlove, 81, American actor and radio announcer.
- Abbot Low Moffat, 94, American politician, cancer.
- Hugh Robson, 77, New Zealand lawn bowls competitor.
- Bill Serena, 71, American baseball player (Chicago Cubs).

=== 18 ===
- Brook Berringer, 22, American gridiron football player, plane crash.
- Ronald Davies, 91, American district judge (United States District Court for the District of North Dakota).
- Bernard Edwards, 43, American bass player and record producer, pneumonia.
- Chester Gray, 82, American baseball player.
- Bill Kendall, 86, Canadian ice hockey player (Chicago Black Hawks, Toronto Maple Leafs).
- Mike Leander, 54, English arranger, songwriter and record producer, cancer.
- Secondo De Marchi, 84, Italian Olympic boxer (1936).
- Len Millar, 70, Australian rules footballer.
- Hubert Opperman, 91, Australian racing cyclist.
- Gino Rozzini, 79, Canadian ice hockey player (Boston Bruins).
- Leônidas da Silva, 82, Brazilian Olympic swimmer (1936).

=== 19 ===
- Yukiyoshi Aoki, 61, Japanese Olympic swimmer (1952, 1956).
- James B. Clark Jr., 39, American murderer, execution by lethal injection.
- Ken Doherty, 90, American decathlete and Olympian (1928).
- Augusto Lobos, 83, Chilean footballer.
- John Martin, 36, English spree killer, suicide.
- Buddy Oldfield, 84, English cricket player and umpire.

=== 20 ===
- John Barrie, 71, English snooker player.
- Hank Biasatti, 74, Canadian basketball and baseball player (Philadelphia Athletics).
- Alexander D'Arcy, 87, Egyptian actor.
- Walter D'Ávila, 84, Brazilian actor.
- Frans Gommers, 79, Belgian football player.
- Raúl Meraz, 69, Mexican actor.
- Christopher Robin Milne, 75, English author and bookseller.
- Steve Oneschuk, 65, Canadian football player.
- Fred Roberts, 83, Welsh cricketer and Royal Air Force officer.
- Tran Van Tra, 78, Vietnamese general and commander in the Viet Cong.

=== 21 ===
- Zora Arkus-Duntov, 86, Belgian-American engineer nicknamed the "Father of the Corvette.".
- Walker Cress, 79, American baseball player (Cincinnati Reds).
- Dzhokhar Dudayev, 52, Soviet/Russian general and Chechen leader, homicide.
- Alceo Galliera, 85, Italian conductor and composer.
- Robert Hersant, 76, French newspaper magnate.
- Abdul Hafeez Kardar, 71, Indian cricket player.
- Sigvard Löfgren, 68, Swedish footballer.
- Luigi Pistilli, 66, Italian actor, suicide.
- Paraone Reweti, 79, New Zealand politician.
- Jimmy Snyder, 77, American horse racing announcer & television sports announcer, heart attack.
- Bertel Storskrubb, 78, Finnish middle-distance runner, hurdler and Olympian (1948).

=== 22 ===
- Erma Bombeck, 69, American humorist and writer, kidney disease.
- Bob Brady, 73, American baseball player (Boston Braves).
- Helen Keane, 73, American jazz record producer, breast cancer.
- Molly Keane, 91, Irish writer.
- Joe Lamas, 80, American football player (Pittsburgh Steelers).
- Jug McSpaden, 87, American golfer, and golf course architect, accidental carbon monoxide poisoning.
- Hiteswar Saikia, 62, Indian politician, kidney failure.
- Serafim Subbotin, 75, Soviet/Russian flying ace.
- John Baptist Wolf, 88, American historian, specializing in modern European history.
- Nobuo Yoneda, 66, Japanese computer scientist.

=== 23 ===
- Jean Victor Allard, 82, Canadian general.
- Mario Luigi Ciappi, 86, Italian Cardinal of the Roman Catholic Church.
- Jake Daniel, 85, American baseball player (Brooklyn Dodgers).
- María Lavalle Urbina, 87, Mexican lawyer and politician.
- P. L. Travers, 96, Australian-British novelist (Mary Poppins), epilepsy.
- Jesús Hernández Úbeda, 36, Spanish bicycle racer.
- Siegfried Viebahn, 84, German Olympic diver (1936).

=== 24 ===
- Mel Bleeker, 75, American football player (Philadelphia Eagles, Los Angeles Rams).
- Donald Cammell, 62, British film director, suicide.
- Giliante D'Este, 86, Italian rower and Olympian (1928, 1932, 1936).
- Tomás de Bhaldraithe, 79, Irish language scholar and lexicographer.
- Gary Geiger, 59, American baseball player, cirrhosis.
- Sulo Heino, 87, Finnish Olympic hammer thrower (1936).
- Preston Lockwood, 83, British actor.
- Aldo Masciotta, 86, Italian Olympic fencer (1936).
- Rafael Orozco, 50, Spanish musician, AIDS-related complications.
- Frank Riley, 80, American writer.
- Vincenzo Torriani, 77, Italian sports executive and director of the Giro d'Italia.

=== 25 ===
- Saul Bass, 75, American graphic designer and filmmaker, lymphoma.
- John Lorne Campbell, 89, British historian.
- Althea Henley, 84, American film actress and dancer.
- Tommy Irwin, 83, American baseball player (Cleveland Indians).
- Dick Wesson, 73, American actor, comedian, comedy writer, and producer, aortic aneurysm.
- Harold Alden Wheeler, 92, American electrical engineer.

=== 26 ===
- Trevor Barker, 39, Australian rules footballer.
- Jack Boyd, 90, Australian rules footballer.
- Wolfgang Franz, 90, German mathematician.
- Milt Gaston, 100, American baseball player.
- Guido Leontini, 69, Italian actor.
- Stirling Silliphant, 78, American screenwriter (In the Heat of the Night, The Towering Inferno, The Poseidon Adventure) and film producer.
- Burton Stein, 70, American Indologist.

=== 27 ===
- William Colby, 76, American intelligence agent, drowning.
- John Dickey, 81, Canadian politician, member of the House of Commons of Canada (1947-1957).
- Gilles Grangier, 84, French film director and screenwriter.
- Joe Margucci, 74, American football player (Detroit Lions).
- Adam Roarke, 58, American actor and film director, heart attack.
- Rudolf Schulten, 72, German physicist.
- Joan Sterndale-Bennett, 82, British actress.

=== 28 ===
- Pieter Beets, 96, Dutch Olympic cyclist (1920).
- Johnny Bucha, 71, American baseball player (St. Louis Cardinals, Detroit Tigers).
- Hugues Frayer, 73, French Olympic athlete (1948, 1952).
- Al Hollingsworth, 88, American baseball player.
- Svea Holst, 95, Swedish film actress.
- Orville Prescott, 89, American literary critic (The New York Times).
- Tien Soeharto, 72, wife of the Indonesian president, Suharto
- Lester Sumrall, 83, American minister.

=== 29 ===
- George Batson, 83, Australian rules footballer.
- Thomas Caterbone, 31, American football player (Philadelphia Eagles).
- Mario David, 68, French actor, pulmonary embolism.
- Ray Kinsella, 85, Canadian ice hockey player (Ottawa Senators).
- Claude Overton, 68, American basketball player (Philadelphia Warriors).
- François Picard, 75, French racing driver.

=== 30 ===
- Jeanne Bal, 67, American actress and model, breast cancer.
- Raphaël Van Dorpe, 85, Belgian architect.
- Juan Hohberg, 69, Argentine-Uruguayan football player and coach.
- Dezső Keresztury, 91, Hungarian politician.
- Julio César Méndez Montenegro, 80, president of Guatemala.
- David Opatoshu, 78, American actor (Exodus, Torn Curtain, Dr. Kildare).
- Rosaura Revueltas, 85, Mexican actress, dancer, and author, lung cancer.
