= Mimi Leder =

American filmmaker (born 1952)

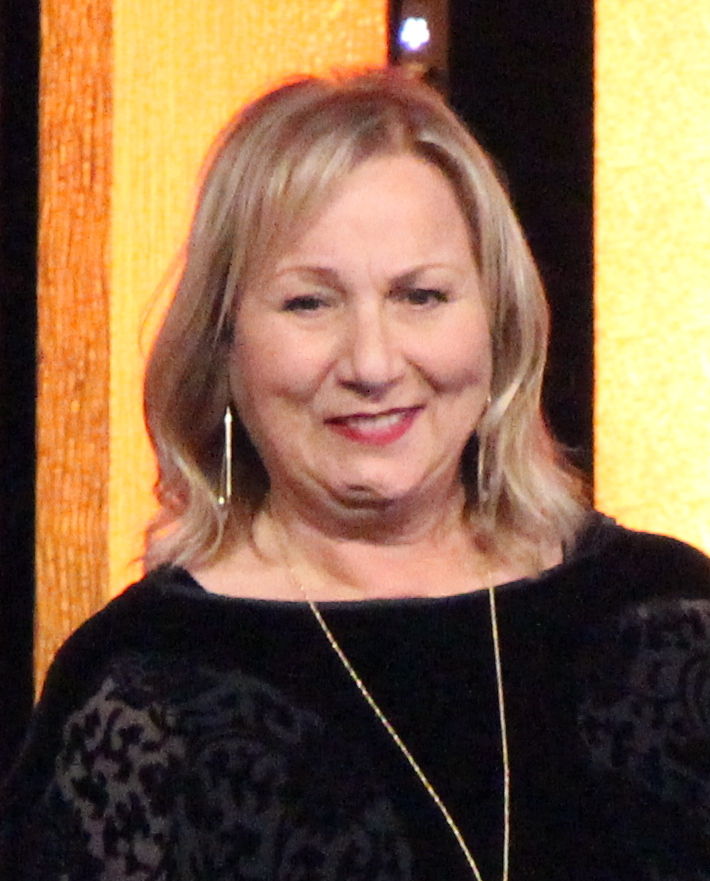
- Leder at the 75th Annual Peabody Awards in 2016
- Born: Miriam Leder; January 26, 1952 (age 74); New York City, U.S.
- Education: AFI Conservatory
- Occupations: Film director, film producer, script supervisor
- Years active: 1976–present
- Spouse: Gary Werntz
- Children: Hannah Leder

Miriam Leder (/ˈliːdər/; born January 26, 1952) is an American film and television director and producer; she is noted for her action films and use of special effects. She has directed the films The Peacemaker (1997), Deep Impact (1998), Pay It Forward (2000), and On the Basis of Sex (2018). She was the first female graduate of the AFI Conservatory, in 1973. She has been nominated for ten Emmy Awards, winning two.

== Early life ==
Miriam Leder was born in New York City in 1952, the daughter of Etyl, a classical pianist, and Paul Leder, a director, producer, actor, writer, and editor of films including My Friends Need Killing, A*P*E, and I Dismember Mama. Leder grew up in Los Angeles in a Jewish household. Her mother is a Holocaust survivor (Auschwitz concentration camp) from Brussels, Belgium. During childhood, her father, a low-budget independent filmmaker, introduced Mimi and her siblings to film production. Her father often dropped her off at the cinema to watch the latest films. Leder said that one of the early films which had an impact on her was Federico Fellini's 8½. She was the first woman accepted into the AFI Conservatory, where she studied cinematography.

== Film career ==
Leder began her career as a second unit director on her father's 1976 film A*P*E, then as a script supervisor on a string of films, including Spawn of the Slithis (1978), Dummy (1979), The Boy Who Drank Too Much (1980), and A Long Way Home (1980) and then moved to the TV series Hill Street Blues (1981). After making the short film Short Order Dreams, written and funded by her father Paul, she screened it for Steven Bochco, creator of Hill Street Blues, and his friend Gregory Hoblit who hired her to direct an episode of L.A. Law.

In 1988, Leder directed episodes of Crime Story, The Bronx Zoo, Midnight Caller, then directed several episodes of China Beach (1988–91) for which she was nominated for four Emmys. She made the made-for-TV films Woman with a Past (1992), House of Secrets (1993), and Baby Brokers (1994), then became one of the core directors for ER (1994–2009). The show earned her Emmy Awards for Outstanding Drama Series in 1995 and 1996. She returned to direct an episode of the series during its final season in 2009. She soon received a job offer from Steven Spielberg to direct the film The Peacemaker (1997).

Continuing to work for DreamWorks, she directed Deep Impact (1998) and Pay It Forward (2000) while simultaneously creating Sentimental Journey (1999), a personal love story about her parents. When asked for a reaction about her film Deep Impact (1998) vs. a rival movie release at the same time Armageddon (1998), she responded: "Michael Bay did come to my premiere, which really shocked me. And I can tell you that after—after [seeing] my film—he went and reshot the end of his." After making Pay It Forward Leder went through a period where she wasn't hired to direct any feature films. "Most women who don't have commercial success are not asked back to the party. It did not hurt me in television, but it did in features." Leder felt as though she had been put into a "movie jail" by Hollywood for the lack of success of Pay It Forward.

Leder's dry spell of feature films after the release of Pay It Forward drove her to other pursuits in television and film. She shot nine pilots and produced six series, including The Beast (2001), John Doe (2002), Johnny Zero (2005), and Vanished (2006). Leder also made many made-for-TV movies such as Thick as Thieves (2009), U.S. Attorney (2009), and Heavenly (2011). In 2015, Leder was brought by HBO to direct a first-season episode of The Leftovers and later hired as a co-showrunner.

Leder's feature film On the Basis of Sex, the story of Ruth Bader Ginsburg's path to become a U.S. Supreme Court Justice, was released in December 2018. It was Leder's first theatrical feature in 18 years.

== Personal life ==
Leder has a daughter, Hannah, with her husband actor Gary Werntz. Mimi Leder has said she "was raised a feminist" and "was an anti-war protester all during the Vietnam War."

== Filmography ==
Film

- The Peacemaker (1997)
- Deep Impact (1998)
- Sentimental Journey (1999) (Short film)
- Pay It Forward (2000)
- Thick as Thieves (2009)
- On the Basis of Sex (2018)

Ref.:

TV movies

Year	Title	Notes
1988	Nightingales	Pilot for the 1989 TV series
1990	Sisters	Pilot for the 1991 TV series
1991	A Little Piece of Heaven	
1992	Woman with a Past	
1993	Marked for Murder	
1993	There Was a Little Boy	
1993	Rio Shannon	
1993	House of Secrets	
1994	Baby Brokers	
1994	The Innocent	
2009	U.S. Attorney	Also executive producer
2010	The Quinn-tuplets	
2011	Heavenly	

TV series

Year	Title	Director	Producer	Notes
1987	L.A. Law	Yes		Episodes "Fifty Ways to Floss Your Lover" and "Oy Vey! Wilderness!"
1988	A Year in the Life	Yes		Episode "The Little Disturbance of Man" and "Glory Days"
1988	Crime Story	Yes		Episode "The Hearings"
1988	The Bronx Zoo	Yes		Episode "On the Land, on the Sea and in the Halls"
1988	Midnight Caller	Yes		Episode "After It Happened"
1988–1991	China Beach	Yes	Yes	Director (13 episodes); Producer (22 episodes); Supervising producer (16 episodes)
2001	The Beast	Yes	Executive	Episode "The Price"
2002–2003	John Doe	Yes	Executive	Directed 5 episodes
2005	Jonny Zero	Yes	Executive	Directed 4 episodes
2006	The West Wing	Yes		Episode "Election Day Part I"
2006	Related	Yes		
2006	Vanished	Yes	Executive	Directed 4 episodes
1994–2009	ER	Yes	Yes	Director (11 episodes); Supervising producer (14 episodes); Co-executive producer (11 episodes)
2010	Human Target	Yes		"The Wife's Tale"
2011–2012	Shameless	Yes		6 episodes
2012	Smash	Yes		Episodes "The Workshop" and "The Dress Rehearsal"
2012	Luck	Yes		"Episode Nine"
2014–2017	The Leftovers	Yes	Executive	Directed 10 episodes
2019–present	The Morning Show	Yes	Executive	Directed 11 episodes

== Awards and nominations ==
Year	Award	Category	Nominated work	Result	Notes
1990	Primetime Emmy Awards	Outstanding Drama Series	China Beach	Nominated	
1991	American Film Institute	Franklin J. Schaffner Award		Won	
1991	Primetime Emmy Awards	Outstanding Directing for a Drama Series	China Beach	Nominated	
1991	Primetime Emmy Awards	Outstanding Drama Series	China Beach	Nominated	
1992	Primetime Emmy Awards	Outstanding Directing for a Drama Series	China Beach	Nominated	
1995	Primetime Emmy Awards	Outstanding Directing for a Drama Series	ER	Won	
1995	Primetime Emmy Awards	Outstanding Drama Series	ER	Nominated	
1995	Directors Guild of America Awards	Outstanding Directing for a Drama Series	ER	Nominated	
1996	Directors Guild of America Awards	Outstanding Directing for a Drama Series	ER	Nominated	
1996	Primetime Emmy Awards	Outstanding Drama Series	ER	Won	
1996	Primetime Emmy Awards	Outstanding Directing for a Drama Series	ER	Nominated	
1997	Directors Guild of America Awards	Outstanding Directing for a Drama Series	ER	Nominated	
2000	Women in Film Crystal + Lucy Awards	Dorothy Arzner Award		Won	
2006	Primetime Emmy Awards	Outstanding Directing for a Drama Series	The West Wing	Nominated	
2020	Primetime Emmy Awards	Outstanding Directing for a Drama Series	The Morning Show	Nominated	
2024	Primetime Emmy Awards	Outstanding Drama Series	The Morning Show	Nominated	
2024	Primetime Emmy Awards	Outstanding Directing for a Drama Series	The Morning Show	Nominated	

== Notes ==
- Scott, Tobias. "Veteran TV Director Still Tries to Scale Film Barriers." New York Times (10/13/2015): C2. Accessed November 13, 2018
- Brodesser, Claude. "Helmer: Leder Among Men." Daily Variety (6/9/2000): A4. Accessed November 13, 2018
- Goldman, Michael. "Mimi Leger: Director." Millimeter (Nov 1998) Accessed November 13, 2018
- Rochlin, Margy. "For Mimi Leder, Persistence Pays Off." Directors Guild of America Quarterly (Spring 2018) Accessed November 14, 2018
