= Sentell =

Sentell may refer to:

- Liza Walton Sentell, character on American soap opera, Search for Tomorrow
- Paul Sentell (1879–1923), American baseball player, manager, and umpire
- Travis Sentell, character on American soap opera, Search for Tomorrow
