= Lovers and Friends =

- Also known as: For Richer, For Poorer
- Created by: Harding Lemay; Paul Rauch
- Country of origin: United States
- Original language: English
- No. of seasons: 2

Production
- Running time: 30 minutes

Original release
- Network: NBC
- Release: January 3, 1977 – September 29, 1978

Lovers and Friends is an American soap opera that aired on NBC from January 3 to May 6, 1977. When the show didn't catch on immediately, NBC put the show on hiatus for seven months, and then brought it back on December 6, 1977, as a retooled show with the title For Richer, For Poorer. The show continued on until it came to an end on September 29, 1978.

The show was created by Harding Lemay and Paul Rauch, who were both also working for the daytime drama Another World. Lovers and Friends was not a spinoff or an indirect spin-off of the former series; however, it did take the place of the direct Another World spinoff, Somerset, on the NBC schedule upon its premiere, and did have some brief cameo cross-over appearances from Another World characters. None of the show's characters came from Another World, nor did any of that show's characters appear on it until it became For Richer, For Poorer.

== History ==
=== Lovers and Friends (January–May 1977) ===
The show was set in the fictional Chicago suburb of Point Clair, Illinois, and focused on the trials and tribulations of two neighboring families, the wealthy Cushings and the middle class Saxtons. Point Clair was a highly wealthy suburb, allegedly modeled after the real life community of Lake Forest, Illinois, the wealthiest of the North Shore suburbs in the Chicago Metropolitan area.

The Cushings were Richard Cushing (Ron Randell), a successful stockbroker who owned a brokerage house called Cushing and Sons, who also had an affair with his secretary, Barbara Manners; his proper and high society wife, Edith (Nancy Marchand, Laurinda Barrett), who stayed in the marriage, even though she knew about and tended to tolerate Richard's infidelity; their college aged son, Austin (Rod Arrants) who was an alcoholic due to his inability to be an artist and finding out his girlfriend, Laurie Brewster was sent to Europe by her mother to break up their relationship; and their daughter, Megan (Patricia Estrin; Darlene Parks) who was unhappily engaged to wealthy and stuffy Desmond Hamilton (David Knapp). She was engaged to him, because she felt that was what was prudent for her upbringing and she feared defying her mother.

Also living with and offering some sage, down-to-earth advice and also a touch of humor to the often stuffy Cushing home was Edith's mother, Sophia Slocum (Margaret Barker). It was Sophia, who wasn't constrained by wealth or societal pretensions, who counseled Megan to look into her heart and to marry for love, and not for money or societal propriety, the way she and Edith had. These words of advice from Sophia helped Megan to break off her unhappy engagement.

The Cushing's new neighbors were the Saxtons, who were newcomers to Point Clair. The father, Lester (John Heffernan; Albert Stratton) was a former factory worker and alcoholic, who had recently acquired a higher paying job as a warehouse supervisor, thanks to the help of his married daughter, Eleanor Kimball (Flora Plumb) and her husband, wealthy attorney, George Kimball (Stephen Joyce), which also allowed them to purchase the house next door to the Cushings in Point Clair.

He was married to the compassionate Josie (Patricia Englund) and was the father of four other children, besides Eleanor, the oldest daughter. Rhett (Bob Purvey, David Ramsey, Tom Happer), the oldest son, a professional photographer who had been engaged to longtime girlfriend, Connie Ferguson (Susan Foster, Cynthia Bostick) until he fell in love with his neighbor Megan Cushing; Jason (Richard Backus) who was somewhat conniving and scheming, always wanting to get ahead, but always meant well; youngest brother, Bentley (David Abbott) and youngest sister, Tessa (Vicky Dawson; Breon Gorman). Both Bentley and Tessa, who were in high school, felt out of place in wealthy Point Clair, and longed to return to Hammond, their former neighborhood in Chicago. In fact, of the siblings, Rhett, Jason and Ellie (as Eleanor was called) were all in approval of the move.

Also living with the Saxtons was their cousin Amy Gifford (Christine Jones), who had fallen in love with Austin Cushing. (Christine Jones brought the Amy Gifford character from Another World, hence the ties to Lovers and Friends. Jones would later return to Another World as Steve Frame's sister, Janice.)

The Saxtons had moved to Point Clair on the very same day that Edith had thrown an engagement party for Megan and Desmond. She was absolutely appalled at the fact that a new family had moved into the house that the Brewsters once owned, and she was upset at Viola for selling it to the Saxtons in the first place. She made it her mission to keep the lower-class Saxtons out of her family, but her efforts were for naught.

The only member of the Cushings, at first, who made them feel welcome, was Sophia, who was a lot more friendly than her snobbish daughter was. After an initial bad impression, Austin and Megan became more friendly with their new neighbors and would often spend more time at their house, because they felt more at ease with the Saxtons than at their own home. Sophia, who herself became a frequent visitor to the Saxton home and became friendly with all of them, became a grandmotherly figure to the youngest Saxton daughter, Tessa.

Alcoholic Austin turned to his next-door neighbor, Lester Saxton, (after his grandmother, Sophia, had confided to him about Austin's troubles) who had been through the same situations that Austin was going through, for guidance; and with his support and help, stayed off the booze and faced his problems in Point Clair. Richard had wanted Austin to go into a wealthy sanitarium to dry out, but he impressed his father by taking responsibility for his actions and remained in town to deal with his troubles, being helped along by Lester and Amy, who became his support system. This allowed Richard to become a lot more friendly with the Saxtons, although he knew that would anger his wife, Edith.

Both families were astonished though, when Rhett and Megan announced their engagement. The only one, besides Rhett and Megan, who was happy about the engagement was Sophia, who was enthused that Megan had followed her advice and fell for someone she loved and not married for money or society's approval.

=== For Richer, For Poorer (December 1977–September 1978) ===
When the show was retooled into For Richer, For Poorer, several major changes had occurred. The show's setting was still Point Clair; Rhett's name was changed to Bill and he did marry Megan; Edith Cushing's husband Richard died, leaving her a widow; the Cushings and Saxtons, although they were now related due to Bill and Megan's marriage, were no longer neighbors; and Amy Gifford married Austin Cushing. Edith had also done a complete about-face in her relations with the Saxtons, as she was now much more friendly to them than she was in the previous incarnation.

Also in the story, in both versions of the show, was the Brewster family, whose house the Saxtons had bought when they moved to Point Clair, mother Viola (Patricia Barry) and her daughter, Laurie (Julia MacKenzie). Viola and Edith used to be friends, until she sold her house to the Saxtons, angering Edith.

Despite his marriage to Megan, Bill's former fiancée, Connie Ferguson, announced that she was pregnant; the father was never revealed, but it was rumored to be Bill's.

Despite the changes to the storyline, For Richer, For Poorer suffered from low ratings in its time slot. NBC announced the cancellation of the program in the summer of 1978; the final episode would air on September 29 of that year. The Monday after For Richer, For Poorer aired its last episode, The Hollywood Squares would occupy the show's timeslot; however, in January 1979, the network opted to move Days of Our Lives to occupy the 1:00 p.m. Eastern hour in an attempt to compete against All My Children, which had easily beaten For Richer, Poor Poorer in the ratings.

== Title sequences ==
When the series premiered as Lovers and Friends, the opening titles showed two large houses on a suburban street side by side, supposedly to show the Cushing house and the Saxton house as neighbors to one another. The program's title was then shown in script over the picture of the two houses.

When it was rebranded as For Richer, For Poorer, the titles were changed. It showed a road with two different worlds, on the left was a leafy suburban neighborhood and on the right was an urban Chicago neighborhood. Meeting in the middle were a young couple (supposedly Megan Cushing and Bill Saxton) kissing, showing that their worlds were united. The title zoomed out and above the title, a rainbow was shown.

== Famous alumni ==
Notable stars from the series who went on to greater fame in either daytime or primetime series, were Rod Arrants (who married his co-star, Patricia Estrin), Nancy Marchand, Patricia Barry, Christine Jones, Margaret Barker, Nancy Snyder, John Heffernan, and Patricia Englund.
