= Breaking Up (1978 film) =

1978 American TV film

- Genre: Drama
- Written by: Loring Mandel
- Directed by: Delbert Mann
- Starring: Lee Remick; Granville Van Dusen; Vicky Dawson
- Music by: Walt Levinsky
- Country of origin: United States
- Original language: English

Production
- Executive producer: David Susskind
- Producer: Frederick H. Brogger
- Cinematography: Gilbert Taylor
- Editor: Gene Milford
- Running time: 100 minutes
- Production companies: Talent Associates; Time-Life Television Productions

Original release
- Network: ABC
- Release: January 2, 1978

Breaking Up is a 1978 American TV film. It was directed by Delbert Mann and written by Loring Mandel.

== Plot ==
A woman re-evaluates her life after her husband walks out on her following 15 years marriage.

== Cast ==
- Lee Remick as Joann Hammil
- Granville Van Dusen as Tom Hammil
- Vicky Dawson as Amy Hammil
- David Stambaugh as T C Hammil
- Fred J. Scollay as Tony
- Stephen Joyce as Gabe
- Cynthia Harris as Edie
- Michael Lombard as Ira
- Meg Mundy as Louise Crawford
- Ed Crowley as George
- Linda Sorenson as Mickey
- Kenneth McMillan as Vancrier

== Reception ==
The Los Angeles Times called it "outstanding".

== Tom and Joann ==
The film was adapted into a pilot Tom and Joann where the leads were played by Joel Fabiani and Elizabeth Ashley. The series did not result.

== EAR/ONS Phone Call ==
The film received some infamy for being audible in the background during one of American serial rapist and serial killer Joseph James DeAngelo's taunting phone calls to a previous rape victim who he threatened to attack again and murder.
