= Roslyn Kind =

American actress and singer (born 1951)

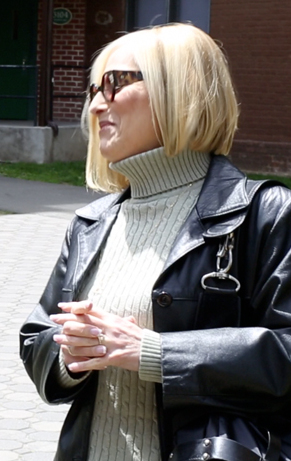
- Kind in 2013
- Born: January 9, 1951 (age 75); New York City, U.S.
- Occupations: Actress, singer
- Years active: 1967–present
- Spouse: Randy Stone (m. 1983; div. 1988)
- Relatives: Barbra Streisand (half-sister); Jason Gould (nephew)

Roslyn Kind (born January 9, 1951) is an American actress and singer-songwriter. She is the maternal half-sister of Barbra Streisand. She has been performing on Broadway and other venues since her teenage years.

== Early life ==
Kind was born on 1951 in Brooklyn, New York. Her parents were Louis Kind and Diana Rosen Streisand Kind. They divorced when Roslyn was six. She was brought up in the Conservative movement of Judaism, going to temple and yeshiva as a child.

== Career ==
Kind's inspiration for being a singer came from her grandfather, who was a cantor, and her mother, a former opera singer. Kind recorded her debut album two months after graduating from high school in June 1968. The album, titled Give Me You, was released in January 1969, at the same time as her first professional performance, at the Hungry I in San Francisco.

Kind's New York debut was at the Plaza Hotel's Persian Room in 1969, where she played to a packed house that included her half-sister, Barbra Streisand. She performed on April 16, 1977, episode of Saturday Night Live, which was hosted by Barbra Streisand's ex-husband Elliott Gould.

Kind has spent the past several decades touring internationally as a cabaret singer and entertainer. She was featured in Barbra Streisand's 2012 national tour, Back to Brooklyn, and 2013 European tour, Barbra Streisand LIVE, during which she sang a duet with her half-sister. A few of Kind's shows are directed by Barbra Streisand's concert director, Richard Jay-Alexander.

Kind released her new single, "Light of Love", on January 17, 2020.

== Theater credits ==
Broadway

- 3 from Brooklyn

Off-Broadway

- Show Me Where the Good Times Are
- Leader of the Pack
- Ferguson the Tailor
- William Finn's Elegies

== Selected television credits ==
- Ed Sullivan Show (2 appearances 1969/70)
- For Me...Formidable (1969 - Charles Aznavour special)
- Saturday Night Live (season 2) (April 16, 1977)
- Gimme a Break! (1983/84)
- "Throb" (1986)
- The Howard Stern Show (1994)
- The Nanny (1996) (This appearance showcases her own composition, Light of Love.)
- The Florence Henderson Show (2007)
- you & me (2013)
- TODAY show (April 2, 2014)

== Film credits ==
- Vocalist - Title song for the made-for-TV movie Not Just Another Affair (1982)
- I'm Going to Be Famous (1983)
- The Underachievers (1987)
- Switched at Birth (film) (1991 made-for-TV movie)
- Ladies of the House (2008 Hallmark TV movie)
- Vocalist - Hold On for the award-winning film Tru Loved (2008)

== Discography ==
- Give Me You, RCA Victor LSP-4138 (1969)
- This Is Roslyn Kind, RCA Victor LSP-4256 (1969)
- Come What May, Right Kind Music (1994), re-release with bonus track (2007)
- Light of Love, re-released in January 2020

Guest appearance

- Cabaret Noel: A Broadway Cares Christmas
