= Those She Left Behind =

1989 television film directed by Waris Hussein

- Genre: Drama
- Written by: Michael O'Hara
- Directed by: Waris Hussein
- Starring: Gary Cole; Joanna Kerns; Mary Page Keller
- Theme music composer: Mark Snow
- Country of origin: United States
- Original language: English

Production
- Producer: R.W. Goodwin
- Cinematography: Robert Steadman
- Editors: Paula Brody; Steven Hirsch
- Running time: 96 minutes
- Production company: NBC Productions

Original release
- Network: NBC
- Release: March 6, 1989

Those She Left Behind is a 1989 American made-for-television drama film directed by Waris Hussein and starring Gary Cole, Joanna Kerns, and Mary Page Keller. Its plot concerns a father forced to raise his newborn daughter alone after the unexpected death of his wife of an extremely rare condition during childbirth. It was inspired by the sitcom Full House and enjoyed some of the sitcom's success due to some shared themes as well as similar casting. Co-star Colleen Dewhurst won a 1989 Primetime Emmy Award for Outstanding Supporting Actress - Miniseries or a Movie.

== Plot ==
Scott Grimes (Gary Cole) is a thirtysomething upwardly mobile businessman who owns a rising real estate company. His company is performing well enough that a larger realtor cold calls with an offer to buy Scott out. His 28 year old wife Sue (Mary Page Keller) is pregnant with their first child. As the due date approaches, Scott surprises her with a baby shower and by revealing that he just purchased a large plot of land in the countryside to build their dream house upon. Sue ends up going into labor early while Scott is at work and is rushed to the hospital by his assistant, Diane (Joanna Kerns). Scott is told the news when he gets back from showing a property and leaves to meet them at the hospital, but gets stuck in traffic. Once he arrives, he learns from a distraught Diane that Sue died during childbirth but the doctors managed to save his baby daughter, whom he names Katie.

Struggling to process his feelings following the sudden death of his young wife who was in ostensibly perfect health from a previously undetected aneurysm, Scott is now staring down the unexpected burden of having to care for Katie entirely on his own when they had planned for Sue to be a stay-at-home mother. Diane offers to take on more responsibility at the office to lighten Scott's workload while his mother-in-law Margaret (Colleen Dewhurst) stays with him to take care of Katie. The situation quickly stresses Scott out and he confides in Diane that he blames Katie for Sue's death. Nonetheless, Scott manages to make things work until Margaret has a health event from burnout. Scott and his father in law Bill (George Coe) agree that Margaret isn't able to handle the workload required to be Katie's caretaker due to her elderly age and that it's best she return home to Detroit.

Scott hires Rosa (Lupe Ontiveros), a nanny, to take Margaret's place, but finds himself dissatisfied with her job performance. While she is out at a bingo night, Katie starts crying and Scott struggles to tend to her care. He is unable to get ahold of Rosa and when she comes home an hour late, Scott blows up at her in frustration. Despite his apology the next day, Rosa quits without notice. Reluctant to hire another nanny, Scott utilizes child care services. However, the long periods of time away from Katie prevents Scott from noticing the changes in her behavior until he receives a distraught call from Katie's teenaged babysitter because she won't stop crying. Scott brings her home but nothing he tries can get her to go to sleep. Frustrated, Scott leaves her alone in her crib and goes to bed. When he wakes up the next morning, he finds her still crying and covered in vomit. Scott immediately takes her to receive medical care.

The pediatrician finds Katie has been suffering from a hernia, will require surgery and her condition had deteriorated enough that ignoring it for one more day would have been catastrophic. He grills Scott on why he didn't bring her in sooner, to which Scott pleas ignorance. Nonetheless, the pediatrician puts a note in Katie's file that she may be a victim of child abuse. This strongly disturbs Scott, prompting him to begin psychotherapy. He confesses to the psychologist that while Katie was undergoing her operation he was indifferent about whether or not she survived due to all the stress she had caused him, leading him to fear he's an unfit parent. Over Diane's objections, Scott puts Katie up for adoption and begins entertaining the buyout offer for his business, tempted to leave Los Angeles entirely and start over. Scott starts experiencing separation anxiety immediately after Katie is placed with her foster parents and decides he can't go through with it. He takes Katie back the next day and tells Diane he couldn't let Katie go because she is his only remaining connection to Sue. Diane replies that she also misses Sue, has lingering psychological trauma from witnessing Sue's death firsthand and wants to be a part of Katie's life because she also views Katie as a connection to Sue.

With this greater clarity about his feelings and Diane's help with raising Katie, Scott begins getting his life back on track. He begins properly bonding with Katie while his relationship with Diane slowly turns romantic. Diane's success in helping manage the business in Scott's absence leads her to offer to buy in and become a partner, which would allow her to take over managing the day-to-day operations while Scott devotes his time to raising Katie instead of having to sell the business entirely. Scott initially has mixed reactions to Diane's proposal. He and Katie travel to Detroit to spend Christmas with Sue's parents. Scott reveals to Margaret that he wants to use his time there to get to know Sue better, prompting her to give Scott Sue's diary as a gift. Scott, in return, gives her and Bill a VCR with the promise that he will mail them home movies of Katie growing up. He reads the diary on the flight home and it helps him make peace with Sue's departure. Katie wakes up in the middle of the night running a fever, though with Diane's help he is able to properly tend to her care this time, raising his confidence in his parenting abilities. He accepts Diane's offer to become partner in his business while also telling her that he won't be ready to remarry for a long time.

A year later, the business is thriving while Katie is now a toddler walking on her own. Diane stops by on Scott's birthday to drop off a gift - a new vanity plate for his Volvo 740 that celebrates his fatherhood.

== Cast ==
- Gary Cole ... Scott Grimes
- Joanna Kerns ... Diane Pappas
- Mary Page Keller ... Sue Grimes
- George Coe ... Bill Page
- Maryedith Burrell ... Ann Hobson
- Colleen Dewhurst ... Margaret Page
- Joel Polis ... Kerns
- Saachiko ... Dr. Yamura
- Judyann Elder ... Counselor
- Paul Mendoza ... Acosta
- David Selburg ... Dr. Razzar
- Lupe Ontiveros ... Rosa
- Vicky Dawson ... Mrs. Kroyer
- Harry Stephens ... Dr. Paul Spencer
- James Edgcomb ... Poker player (as Jim Edgecomb)
- Folkert Schmidt ... Eric
