= List of Pakistani films of 1996 =

List of Pakistani films by year 1996

This is a list of films produced in Pakistan in 1996 (see 1996 in film) and in the Urdu language.

== 1996 ==
Title	Director	Cast	Genre	Notes
1996
Aalmi Ghunday		Saima, Yousuf, Reema		
Aao Pyar Karen		Neeli, Javed, Nargis		
Bazigar		Meera, Babur Ali, Arbaaz Khan		
Be-qabu		Reema, Babar Ali, Rambo		
Chamak		Madiha, Suleman, Reena		
Chief Sahib	Javed Sheikh	Neeli, Javed Sheikh, Meera, Salim Sheikh	Music	The film was released on March 26, 1996.
Chor Machaye Shor	Syed Noor	Babar Ali, Ali Ejaz, Afzal Khan, Reema Khan, Resham, Sahiba Khan, Saud Ali	Comedy	A re-make of 1980's Punjabi film Sohra Te Jawai, The film was released on March 22, 1996.
Choron Ke Ghar Chor		Kubra, Ghalib Kamal		
Ghunghat	Syed Noor	Shaan Shahid, Rehsham, Saima, Arbaaz Khan	Music; Drama	Shaan's Comeback film into film industry. Arbaaz Khan's debut film. The film was released on July 12, 1996
Hum Hayn Aapkay Ghulam		Reema, Babar Ali, Rambo		
Ham To Chaley Susral	Shamim Ara	Reema, Babar Ali, Rambo, Sahiba	Music, Comedy	The film was released on April 29, 1996
Hawaen	Syed Noor	Jan Rambo, Meera, Nadeem, Reema, Saud	Drama	The film was released on May 21, 1996
International Haseena		Musarrat, Tariq Shah		
Jeetay Hain Shaan Se		Sahiba, Asad, Sonia		
Khel		Nain Tara, Sultan Rahi		
Khilona	Sangeeta	Saima, Saud, Shaan, Meera, Salim Sheikh	Drama	The film was released on November 1, 1996
Kurdion Ko Daley Dana		Neeli, Mohsin, Resham		Moammar Rana's debut film.
Lakht-e-Jiggar		Reema, Babur Ali, Rahi		
Love 95		Reema, Babar Ali, Rambo		
Mehndi		Sahiba, Ghalib Kamal		Debut film for Ghalib Kamal son of famous actor Syed Kamal.
Mera Mehboob Mera Qatil		Haseena, Shoaib Khan Gillani, Pakeeza Mughal, Asif Khan Gillani(Child Actor)	Action/Thriller	A Full Action Thriller by Shoaib Khan Gillani.
Miss Istanbul		Reema, Babur Ali, Rambo		
Moamla Garbar Hai		Reema, Babar Ali, Rambo		
Mummy	Iqbal Kashmiri	Nadeem, Atiqa Odho, Mustafa Qureshi, Reema Khan	Drama	
Munda Tera Deewana	Zahoor Hussain Gilani	Reema, Babar Ali, Sahiba, Jan Rambo, Saud	Comedy	Famous Pop Singer Sajjad Ali debut film as an actor. The film was released on January 5, 1996
Raja Sahib		Sahiba, Adil Murad, Sana		Debut film for Adil Murad son of famous actor Waheed Murad.
Raju Ban Gaya Gentleman		Meera, Rambo, Mohsin		
Saza		Shabnum, Faisal Qureshi		
Tilsami Jazeera		Reema, Badar Munir, Asif		
Too Cheez Bari Hai Mast Mast		Sahiba, Rambo, Sana		

== See also ==
- 1996 in Pakistan
