= The Prowler (1981 film) =

1981 American slasher film by Joseph Zito

- Theatrical release poster
- Directed by: Joseph Zito
- Screenplay by: Neal Barbera; Glenn Leopold
- Produced by: Joseph Zito; David Streit
- Starring: Vicky Dawson; Christopher Goutman; Cindy Weintraub; Farley Granger
- Cinematography: João Fernandes (Note: Credited as Raoul Lomas.)
- Edited by: Joel Goodman
- Music by: Richard Einhorn
- Production company: Graduation Films
- Distributed by: Sandhurst Releasing Corp. (United States and Canada); Carolco Services (International)
- Release date: June 26, 1981
- Running time: 89 minutes
- Country: United States
- Language: English
- Budget: $1 million
- Box office: < $1 million

The Prowler is a 1981 American slasher film directed by Joseph Zito, written by Neal Barbera and Glenn Leopold, and starring Vicky Dawson, Christopher Goutman, Lawrence Tierney, Cindy Weintraub, and Farley Granger. The film follows a group of college students in a coastal New Jersey town who are stalked and murdered during a graduation party by an apparent World War II veteran who killed his ex-girlfriend Rosemary Chatham in 1945.

Filmed in late 1980 in Cape May, New Jersey, The Prowler was independently distributed by Sandhurst Releasing Corporation. It was not a major commercial success, ranking 135th overall that year at the U.S. box office, and grossing less than $1 million. In some international territories, the film was released under the alternate title Rosemary's Killer in a version that truncated many of its graphic murder sequences.

Though it has received mixed reviews from critics, The Prowler developed a cult following in the years after its release, with praise aimed at its hard-edged violence—showcasing special effects by Tom Savini—as well as its atmosphere. It has been named one of the greatest slasher films of all time by several publications, including Complex and Paste magazine, and is noted as a classic of the slasher film subgenre. The film has also been compared by a number of critics to another slasher film of the same year with a similar plot, My Bloody Valentine.

== Plot ==
On March 12, 1944 in Avalon Bay, during World War II, a woman named Rosemary Chatham writes a letter to her boyfriend, breaking up with him. On June 28, 1945, Rosemary is attending a graduation dance with her new boyfriend Roy. The couple leave the dance to a lakeside gazebo. There, they are attacked by a mysterious prowler wearing an army combat uniform, who impales them both with a pitchfork and leaves behind a red rose.

On June 28, 1980, college senior Pam MacDonald is making last-minute arrangements for that night's graduation ball, the first to be held since the 1945 murders. Helping Pam are her friends Lisa, Sherry and Sherry's love interest Carl. Later while visiting her boyfriend and the town's deputy, Mark London, Pam overhears a report of a prowler. She expresses her concern about Mark's safety because Sheriff George Fraser is leaving town for a fishing trip. Mark reassures her and promises to meet her at the dance. Pam then heads back to the dorm to get ready and eventually leaves with her friends. Sherry stays behind to shower and receives a surprise visit from Carl. While undressing, he is attacked and killed with a bayonet. The killer then impales Sherry with a pitchfork in the shower.

At the dance, Pam spots Mark and motions him over. As he walks towards her, Lisa asks him to dance. Mark agrees, which upsets Pam. Mark then walks over to Pam and the two share a brief but tense exchange. A moment later, Lisa walks up and bumps Mark, which causes him to spill his drink on her dress. She returns to the dorm to change and is chased by the same prowler, but escapes. She runs outside into elderly wheelchair user Major Chatham who grabs her arm. Pam escapes his grasp and soon reunites with Mark. She tells him about the prowler, so he investigates. After checking the dorm, Mark only finds boot prints and wheelchair tracks outside. The two then go investigate the Major's home. Pam realizes that his daughter was Rosemary and that her killer was never caught. Convinced the prowler from earlier is the same killer, Mark and Pam head back to the dance and warn the chaperone, Allison, about the possible danger.

Meanwhile, Lisa goes out to a nearby swimming pool to cool off and encounters the killer, who slits her throat with the bayonet. Paul, Lisa's boyfriend, is arrested by Mark for disturbing the peace. Allison goes to find Lisa but is stabbed and killed also. Mark and Pam go to investigate the cemetery and discover an open grave with Lisa's body in it. Mark tries to call the lodge that Sheriff Fraser went to, but is ignored by the desk clerk. Mark next calls the state police for help. He informs Pam that the state police told him that the reported prowler had been caught three hours earlier and could not have killed Lisa.

Pam suspects that Lisa's killer is the same killer who murdered Rosemary and Roy in 1945. They go to investigate Major Chatham's house again. Mark is attacked as the prowler chases Pam through the house. Otto, a slow-witted employee of the local convenience store and an armed member of a small posse patrolling the neighborhood for the prowler, appears and shoots the prowler with a rifle, but he quickly recovers and shoots Otto dead with a sawed-off shotgun before again attacking Pam by reloading the shotgun. While pinned to the ground, Pam manages to unmask the prowler, revealed to be Sheriff Fraser. Pam and Fraser wrestle over his shotgun, with her eventually fatally shooting him in the chin.

The next day, Mark returns Pam to her dorm and she goes up alone. Discovering Sherry and Carl's bodies in the shower, she screams as Carl briefly seems to come to life and grab her arm before returning to his dead state.

== Cast ==
- Vicky Dawson as Pam MacDonald
- Christopher Goutman as Deputy Mark London
- Lawrence Tierney as Major Chatham
- Farley Granger as Sheriff George Fraser
- Cindy Weintraub as Lisa
- Lisa Dunsheath as Sherry
- David Sederholm as Carl
- Bill Nunnery as Hotel Clerk
- Thom Bray as Ben
- Diane Rode as Sally
- Bryan Englund as Paul
- Donna Davis as Miss Allison
- Carleton Carpenter as 1945 M.C
- Joy Glaccum as Francis Rosemary Chatham
- Timothy Wahrer as Roy
- John Seitz as Pat Kingsley
- Bill Hugh Collins as Otto
- Dan Lounsbery as Jimmy Turner
- Douglas Stevenson as Young Pat Kingsley
- Susan Monts as Young Pat Kingsley's Date

== Themes ==
Critic Stephen Deusner of The Washington Post has interpreted The Prowler as a "a sly, strange statement about the stakes of war". Deusner cites the film as transgressive in the genre due to its portrayal of a war veteran as its villain: "Not every movie could get away with casting a spurned veteran as its villain, especially not a WWII vet. Even in 1981, that generation was lionized for the austere morality of that conflict, set in sharp relief by the more controversial Vietnam War". Scholar James Kendrick notes The Prowler as thematically linked to such slasher films as The Burning (1981), in which psychological trauma plays an integral role in the acts of murder committed, and where a present event provides the traumatized, maddened villain an "opportunity to take revenge on the guilty parties or their symbolic substitutes".

== Production ==
=== Development ===
The Prowler was co-written by Glenn Leopold and Neal Barbera, son of Joseph Barbera. Director Joseph Zito read the screenplay and was drawn to its "misty quality": "It had this strange, dreamlike mood in it. It wasn't trying to be real, it was trying to be surreal in a way".

=== Casting ===
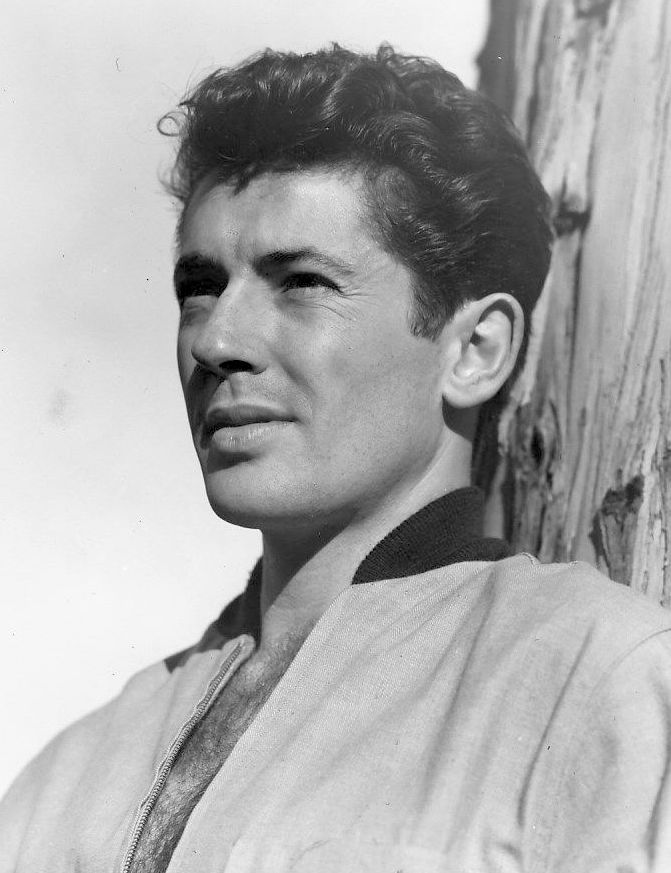
Farley Granger and Vicky Dawson star as the film's leads

Farley Granger was cast in the film through his connection to the wife of an executive producer, with whom he was enrolled in an acting course.

Vicky Dawson, a local New Jersey-based television and soap opera actress known for her appearances on Another World and As the World Turns, was cast as Pam MacDonald. In a 2025 interview, Dawson stated that she could not recall the specifics of her audition for the lead role of Pam, likening it "any other audition. You go in for the audition, you audition, you get the callback."

Lawrence Tierney appears briefly as Major Chatham, an elderly wheelchair-bound man whose house Pam and Mark investigate while attempting to uncover the town's dark history.

=== Filming ===
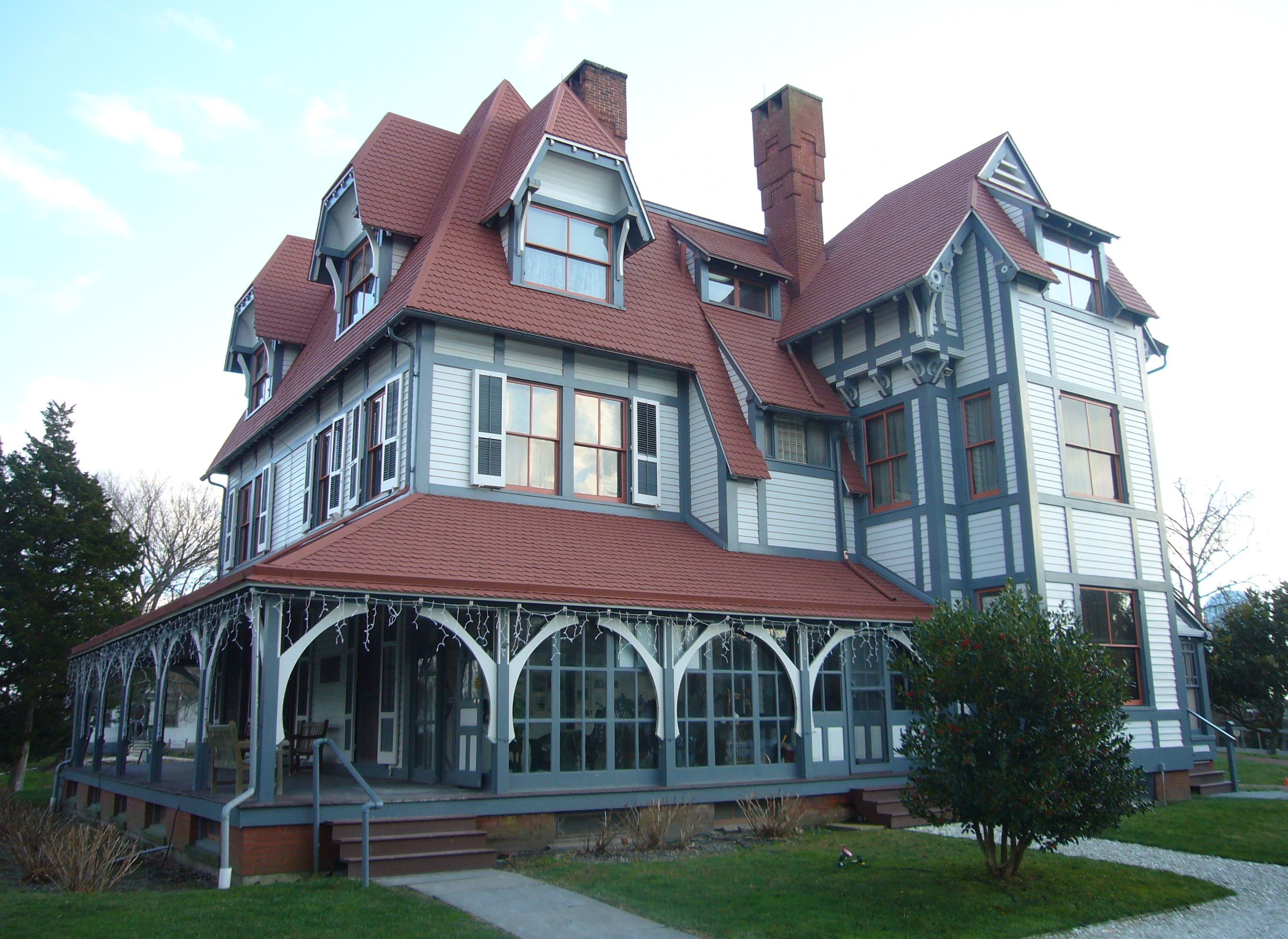
The Emlen Physick Estate served as a filming location

Initially, Zito had wanted to shoot The Prowler in Avalon, California, where it is set, but later decided to shoot the film in Cape May, New Jersey instead, which he felt had a "ghost town quality". The film was shot over a period of six weeks, which each consisted of six days' work, beginning in October 1980. Dawson recalled the shoot lasting approximately two and a half months. Contemporaneous newspaper reports cite a budget of between $400,000 and $500,000, though Zito has stated that the film ultimately cost $1 million to produce. During production, the film had the working title Graduation.

The Inn at Cape May served as the building that appears in the dance sequences, while the Emlen Physick Estate served as the Chatham house, where the film's last act takes place. The dormitory sequences were filmed inside the historic Chalfonte Hotel. The Franklin Street Civic Center served as a school gynmnasium featured in the film.

=== Special effects ===
Tom Savini designed the special effects for the film's elaborate murder sequences. Because the film's death sequences were so special effects-intensive, the shooting schedule was crafted to prioritize the filming of them specifically, with whole days dedicated to one death sequence. Savini recounts his crafting of the effects in the 1983 book Grande Illusions: A Learn-by Example Guide to the Art and Technique of Special Make-up Effects from the Films of Tom Savini, deeming his methods "more primitive" than those he used in subsequent films, largely due to time and budget constraints.

The murder sequence of Carl, who is impaled through the head with a bayonet, was shot using a foam-filled dummy head with a thin plaster structure encased in latex. The sequence concludes with the murder of Sherry, Carl's girlfriend who is subsequently impaled with a pitchfork in the shower. Savini himself dressed as the film's villain, and appears onscreen from Sherry's perspective as he drives the pitchfork into her abdomen; in this point-of-view shot, Savini plunged an actual pitchfork into a piece of wood affixed to the shower wall. For the reverse shots showing Sherry impaled, Savini designed a pitchfork with the prongs sawed off and lined with tubes that pumped fake blood when pressed against the actress's abdomen, creating the graphic illusion of her impalement.

== Music ==
Richard Einhorn composed the film's original score. James Jay Edwards, writing for the film website Film Fracture in 2011, praised Einhorn's score, describing it as "a horror masterpiece. Combining modern (for the time) electronic music with classical sensibilities, the score is always noticeable but never distracting, driving the action instead of being pulled along by it. While not as iconic as some of its contemporaries (like John Carpenter’s eerie piano piece from Halloween or Harry Manfredini’s ki-ki-ki ha-ha-ha from Friday the 13th), Einhorn’s compositions are more musical and moody, creating tension where the visuals lack it." In a 2019 retrospective review for Exclaim!, Brock Thiessen wrote of the score: "At times, Einhorn weaves in some beautifully romantic pieces, especially during the album's first suite, but then at others, he veers off into much more abstract territory, mixing orchestral cues and free-forming electronic soundscapes. In a way, it's like what you'd get from a purposely experimental Morricone score."

In January 2019, Waxwork Records released the film's score on vinyl as a double LP. It was later issued on CD through Howlin' Wolf Records.

== Release ==
=== Censorship ===
The Prowler was released under the alternate title Rosemary's Killer in Australia and Europe in a cut that excises much of Tom Savini's gore effects. The German version omits all of the gore scenes (including the revelation of the killer's identity) and replaced the soundtrack with bird sounds for daytime scenes, cricket sounds for the night scenes, and Richard Einhorn's score with synthesizer music by an uncredited musician. This version goes by the title Die Forke des Todes (The Pitchfork of Death).

The Encyclopedia of Horror (1986) reports that "Savini's particularly graphic special effects resulted in most of the murders being trimmed in the British release print".

=== Home media ===
VCII released the film on VHS in 1981. Blue Underground released the fully uncut version of The Prowler on DVD in 2002 and on Blu-ray in 2010. The extras include a trailer, a still and poster gallery, behind the scenes gore footage with Tom Savini, and an audio commentary with Joseph Zito and Savini.

== Reception ==
=== Box office ===
Initially, Avco Embassy Pictures, who had previously released the slasher Prom Night (1980), expressed interest in distributing The Prowler. The film was ultimately distributed independently in the United States by Sandhurst Distributing Corporation. It opened regionally in Louisville, Kentucky and Dayton, Ohio, on June 26, 1981, followed by a release in Kansas City, Missouri, on September 4, 1981. It premiered in Los Angeles on October 9, 1981. Overall, it ranked 135th at the U.S. box office for the year of 1981, earning less than $1 million during its theatrical run.

=== Critical response ===
Linda Gross of the Los Angeles Times panned the film for its violent content, adding that "director Joseph Zito prowls around aimlessly without creating an authentic sense of locale. Instead, he delivers a spaced-out nightmare in which the characters act like zombies". Stephen Deusner of The Washington Post described the film as "bloody, terrifying, [and] often sadistic... The Prowler is a war movie re-imagined as a slasher flick. And its message is clear: Take your military heroes for granted and they will come back and kill you". Deusner also noted that the film is "gorgeously shot", but conceded that it "is never entirely satisfying. There are too many missed opportunities to transcend the genre’s schlock, too many passages where nothing happens, too many scares that fall flat".

In a review for Slant Magazine, Chris Cabin compared the film to both John Carpenter's Halloween (1978) and William Lustig's Maniac (1980), writing: "These films remain popular due mostly to the films that are made proficiently as far as gore theatrics, tone, and mood are concerned, and in these terms The Prowler is certainly deserving of its modest fan base. What the film lacks in narrative drive, coherence, and performance, it makes up with thoughtful lighting, strong cinematography from Raoul Lomas and an uncredited João Fernandes, and, of course, Savini’s lovingly overblown and impossible splatter effects". Film scholar John Kenneth Muir similarly praised the film, writing that it transcends many of its peers because of its "blunt-faced approach to violence" and Zito's "directorial virtuosity".

The Encyclopedia of Horror notes that like My Bloody Valentine the film moves away from the genre's usual Midwestern setting, but that it does little with the new location, nor with its potentially interesting returning G.I. motif. Like Valentine, the film is judged as being certainly polished, atmospheric, and suspenseful, though hardly original. Leonard Maltin gave the film a negative 1 ^{1/2} out of a possible 4 stars, criticizing the film's plot calling it "illogical". The Time Out film guide noted the film as "cravenly conformist in every department".

AllMovie called it a "run-of-the-mill entry in the early '80s slasher film cycle" that "benefits from an unexpected amount of technical gloss, but has little else to offer". IGN, in their published review of the film in 2004, noted: "While not a great film by any stretch of the imagination, The Prowler just enough things right to earn a recommendation... If you're a fan of early slasher cinema, this one's worth a look—primarily for its stalk sequences (which are relatively well-executed, particularly the one in a swimming pool) and for the FX work of Tom Savini."

In a 2016 retrospective, Dave Wilson of Dread Central noted the film's violent special effects and "sombre atmosphere" as strengths, though conceded that the film's characterization was bland.

On the review aggregator website Rotten Tomatoes, 75% of 8 critics' reviews are positive. Metacritic, which uses a weighted average, assigned the film a score of 45 out of 100, based on 5 critics, indicating "mixed or average" reviews.

== Legacy ==
In the years since its release, The Prowler has developed a cult following and been cited as a classic of the slasher sub-genre from its "golden age" in the early 1980s. Describing the film for a revival screening, the Coolidge Corner Theatre dubbed the film "one of the cruelest 'body-count' movies of the 1980s."

In 2017, Complex magazine named it the 24th-best slasher film of all time. The following year, Paste included it in their list of "The 50 Best Slasher Movies of All Time", while the film's killer was ranked the 11th-greatest slasher villain of all time by LA Weekly.

== Sources ==
- Albright, Brian (2012). Regional Horror Films, 1958-1990: A State-by-State Guide with Interviews. Jefferson, North Carolina: McFarland & Company. ISBN 978-0-786-47227-7.
- Boyreau, Jacques, ed. (2009). Portable Grindhouse: The Lost Art of the VHS Box. Seattle, Washington: Fantagraphic Books. ISBN 978-1-560-97969-2.
- Harper, Jim (2004). Legacy of Blood: A Comprehensive Guide to Slasher Movies. Manchester, United Kingdom: Critical Vision. ISBN 978-1-900-48639-2.
- Kendrick, James (2017). "Slasher Films and Gore in the 1980s". In Benshoff, Harry M. (ed.). A Companion to the Horror Film. Chichester, England: John Wiley & Sons. ISBN 978-1-119-33501-6.
- Maltin, Leonard (2013). Leonard Maltin's 2014 Movie Guide. New York City, New York: Penguin Group. ISBN 978-0-451-41810-4.
- Milne, Tom; Willemin, Paul; Hardy, Phil (1986). Encyclopedia of Horror Movies. London, England: Octopus Books. ISBN 978-0-706-42771-4.
- Muir, John Kenneth (2011). Horror Films of the 1980s. Vol. 1. Jefferson, North Carolina: McFarland & Company. ISBN 978-0-786-45501-0.
- Nowell, Richard (2010). Blood Money: A History of the First Teen Slasher Film Cycle. London, England: Bloomsbury. ISBN 978-1-441-12496-8.
- Rockoff, Adam (2011). Going to Pieces: The Rise and Fall of the Slasher Film, 1978–1986. Jefferson, North Carolina: McFarland & Company. ISBN 978-0-786-46932-1.
- Savini, Tom (1983). Grande Illusions: A Learn-by Example Guide to the Art and Technique of Special Make-up Effects from the Films of Tom Savini. Imagine Books. ISBN 978-0-911-13700-2.
- Zito, Joseph; Savini, Tom (2002). The Prowler (DVD audio commentary). Blue Underground. OCLC 61184012.
