= Vamping =

1984 US drama film

- Directed by: Frederick King Keller
- Screenplay by: Frederick King Keller; Robert Seidman
- Produced by: Frederick King Keller
- Starring: Patrick Duffy; Catherine Hyland; Rod Arrants; Fred A. Keller
- Cinematography: Skip Roessel
- Edited by: Darren Kloomok
- Music by: Ken Kaufman
- Release date: September 1, 1984
- Running time: 105 minutes

Vamping is a 1984 American drama film about a down-on-his-luck saxophonist who agrees to help rob the home of a rich widow, then unexpectedly falls for the woman. Shots of the movie were filmed in Buffalo, New York, including inside the old Buffalo Central Terminal.

== Cast ==
- Patrick Duffy as Harry Baranski
- Catherine Hyland as Diane Anderson
- Rod Arrants as Raymond O' Brien
- Fred A. Keller as Fat Man
- Polli Magaro as Waitress
- David Booze as Benjamin
- Jed Cooper as Lennie
- Steven Gilborn as Jimmy
- John McCurry as Sam
- Wendel Meldrum as Rita
- Henry Stram as Deacon
- Natalia Nogulich as Julie
- Rajmund Fleszar as Old Man
- Frank O'Hara as Old Man
- Isabel Price as Matron
- Lambros Touris as Huge Man
