= I'm Going to Be Famous =

- Video artwork
- Directed by: Paul Leder
- Screenplay by: Paul Leder
- Produced by: Paul Leder; Joe Michael Terry
- Starring: Dick Sargent; Roslyn Kind; Vivian Blaine; Paul Coufos; Meredith MacRae
- Cinematography: Joel King
- Edited by: Paul Leder
- Music by: Jay Asher
- Production company: L. T. Productions
- Release date: 1983
- Running time: 96 minutes
- Country: United States
- Language: English

I'm Going to Be Famous is a 1983 American psychological thriller film written and directed by Paul Leder, and starring Dick Sargent, Roslyn Kind, Vivian Blaine, Paul Coufos, and Meredith MacRae. Its plot follows a group of ambitious actors who resort to violence, blackmail, and murder while vying to appear in a play by a famous author.

== Cast ==
- Dick Sargent as The Director
- Roslyn Kind as Kitty March
- Vivian Blaine as Laura Lowell
- Paul Coufos as Ron Michaels
- Meredith MacRae as Susan Barker
- Joe Michael Terry as Kevin McGraw
- Greg Mullavey as Harold Green
- Robert Q. Lewis as Himself
- Robin Stille as Actress on stage
- Anthony Caldarella as Eddie Garth

== Release ==
The film was released on VHS in the United Kingdom in 1983.

== Reception ==
In his book Movies on TV and Videocassette, 1991-1992, writer Steven H. Scheuer wrote of the film: "Utilizing directorial set-ups not glimpsed since the early talkies and dishing out showbiz cliches you may have forgotten, this incredible film should only be experienced after one gets a 'Backstage Experience' inoculation."

== Sources ==
- Lisanti, Tom (2012). Drive-in Dream Girls: A Galaxy of B-Movie Starlets of the Sixties. Jefferson, North Carolina: McFarland. ISBN 978-0-786-47165-2.
- Rabkin, Leslie Y. (1998). The Celluloid Couch: An Annotated International Filmography of the Mental Health Professional in the Movies and Television, from the Beginning to 1990. Lanham, Maryland: Scarecrow Press. ISBN 978-0-810-83462-0.
- Scheuer, Steven H. (1990). Movies on TV and Videocassette, 1991-1992. New York City, New York: Random House. ISBN 978-0-553-28801-8.
