= Molly & Gina =

- Directed by: Paul Leder
- Written by: Paul Leder; Reuben Leder
- Starring: Frances Fisher; Natasha Gregson Wagner; Peter Fonda
- Release date: 1994

Molly & Gina is a 1994 movie directed by Paul Leder and written by Leder and his son, Reuben. It stars Frances Fisher, Natasha Gregson Wagner, and Peter Fonda. It is also the feature film debut of Elizabeth Berkley. The plot deals with a secretary and an actress who attempt to find the killers of their boyfriends.
