= Rod Arrants =

American actor (1944–2021)

- Rod Arrants on the cover of TV Guide in 1979
- Born: Rodney Allen Arrants; September 5, 1944; Los Angeles, California, U.S.
- Died: February 21, 2021 (aged 76)
- Occupation: Actor
- Known for: The Young and the Restless, Another World, Search for Tomorrow, Days of Our Lives
- Spouses: Beverle Bava (m. 1965; div. 1976) Patricia Estrin (m. 1979; div. 1992)

Rodney Allen Arrants (September 5, 1944 – February 21, 2021) was an American actor.

== Early life and career ==
Arrants was born in Los Angeles, California, on September 5, 1944. He acted on the daytime programs The Young and the Restless, Another World, Days of Our Lives and Search for Tomorrow, on which he played wealthy Travis Sentell.

Arrants appeared on the cover of the August 11, 1979, issue of TV Guide.

== Personal life ==
Arrants attended the University of the Pacific and graduated in 1967. Arrants was married to Beverle Bava from 1965 until they divorced in 1976, and to Patricia Estrin from 1979 until 1992, when they divorced. Arrants and Estrin met while playing brother and sister Austin and Megan Cushing on Lovers and Friends.

Arrants died on February 21, 2021, at the age of 76.

== Filmography ==
=== Film ===
| Year | Title | Role | Notes |
|---|---|---|---|
| 1975 | Linda Lovelace for President | Boone | |
| 1976 | Ape | Tom Rose | |
| 1984 | Vamping | Raymond O'Brien | |
| 1997 | Dark Planet | Alpha Male 2 | |
| 2001 | Thank Heaven | Dr. Goldstein | |
| 2005 | Rent | Mr. Hansen | |
| 2006 | The Darwin Awards | Pilot | |

=== Television ===
| Year | Title | Role | Notes |
|---|---|---|---|
| 1972 | Mannix | Ken Gordon | Episode: "The Open Web" |
| 1973 | The Streets of San Francisco | Rob Evanhauer | Episode: "A Trout in the Milk" |
| 1975 | The Lives of Jenny Dolan | Mr. Wheeling | Television film |
| 1976 | Helter Skelter | Bart Listen | Episode: "Part II" |
| 1977 | Another World | Austin Cushing | 2 episodes |
| 1977–1978 | Lovers and Friends | Austin Cushing | 4 episodes |
| 1980–1984 | Search for Tomorrow | Travis Sentell | 189 episodes |
| 1985 | Dallas | Andre Schumann | 2 episodes |
| 1985 | Remington Steele | Jack Prince | Episode: "Steele of Approval" |
| 1985 | Days of Our Lives | Richard Cates | 52 episodes |
| 1986 | Hunter | Harry Malone | Episode: "62 Hrs. of Terror" |
| 1986 | Simon & Simon | Paul Revere | Episode: "The Apple Doesn't Fall Far from the Tree" |
| 1986 | Cagney & Lacey | Brett Hansen | Episode: "Extraction" |
| 1986 | Hotel | Clark | Episode: "Hornet's Nest" |
| 1987 | Falcon Crest | Henderson Maxwell III | Episode: "Topspin" |
| 1987 | Spies | Sanford | Episode: "The Game's Not Over, 'Til the Fat Lady Sings" |
| 1987–1988 | The Young and the Restless | Dr. Steven Lassiter | 5 episodes |
| 1989 | Hard Time on Planet Earth | Kohler | Episode: "Something to Bank On" |
| 1989 | Star Trek: The Next Generation | Rex | Episode: "Manhunt" |
| 1989 | Chameleons | Dr. Joseph Strand | Television film |
| 1990 | Booker | Kellem Blake | Episode: "Love Life" |
| 1991 | L.A. Law | Richard Fliegel | Episode: "Splatoon" |
| 1991 | Paradise | John Wolcott | Episode: "Shield of Gold" |
| 1991 | Top of the Heap | Hal Clayton / Frank | 2 episodes |
| 1992 | Baywatch | Man on Yacht | Episode: "Masquerade" |
| 1994 | One West Waikiki | Charles Banks | Episode: "Terminal Island" |
| 1994 | California Dreams | Mr. Smith | Episode: "Daddy's Girl" |
| 1995 | Charlie Grace | Castelli | Episode: "Designer Knock-Off" |
| 1997 | Spy Game | The Businessman | Episode: "What Family Doesn't Have Its Ups and Downs?" |
| 1998 | Star Trek: Voyager | Vaskan Ambassador Daleth | Episode: "Living Witness" |
| 1998 | Dharma & Greg | Pilot | Episode: "Yes, We Have No Bananas (or Anything Else for That Matter)" |
| 1999 | Profiler | Lucas' Lawyer | Episode: "Where or When" |
