= Christine Jones (actress) =

American actress

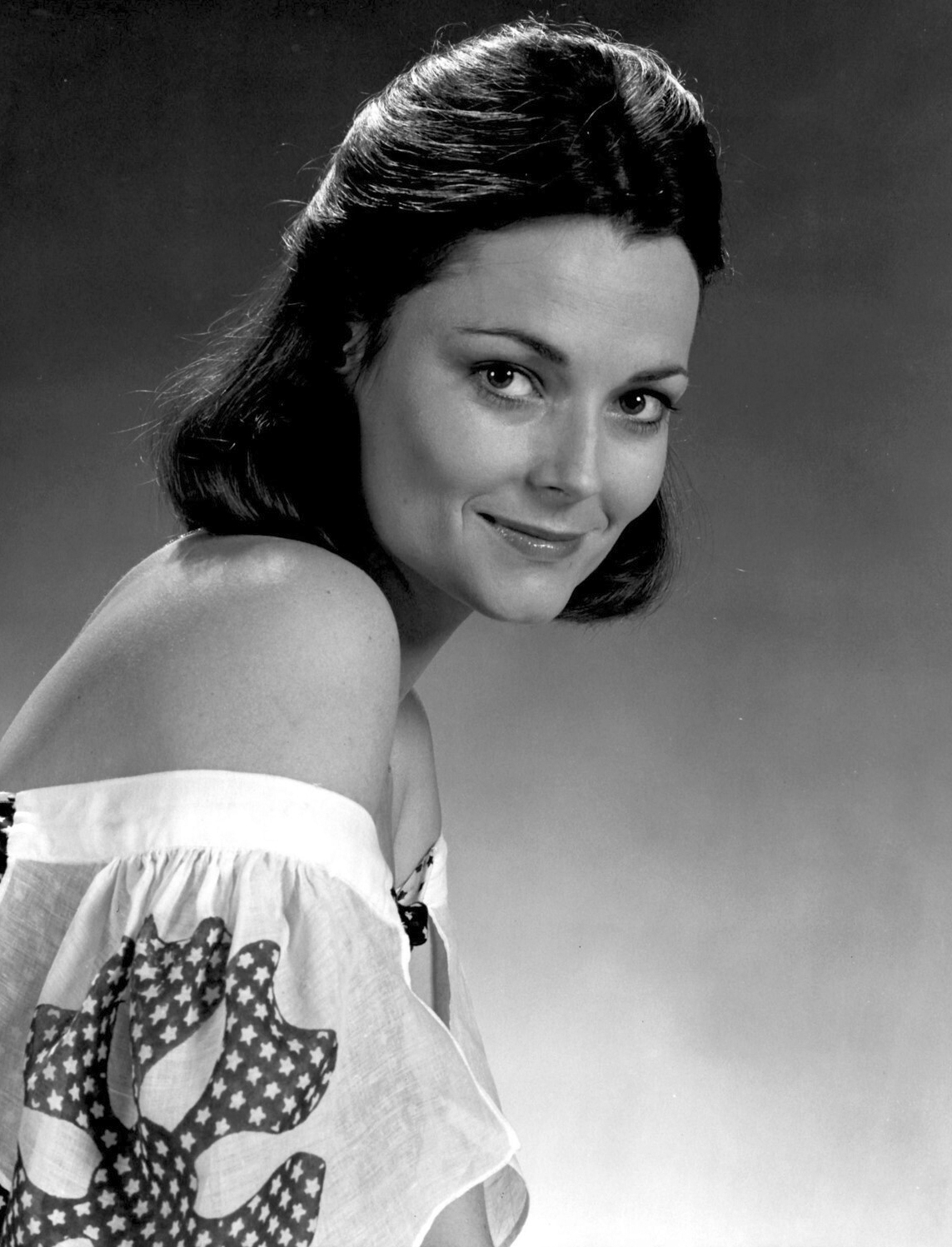
- Born: Christine Young Jones
- Occupation: Actress
- Known for: Soap operas
- Spouse: Thomas Lipscomb (m. 1981)
- Relatives: Branch Rickey (grandfather)

Christine Young Jones is an American actress.

== Personal life ==
Jones is the daughter of Robert Terry Jones and Jane Rickey. She is one of four children. Jones is the granddaughter of Branch Rickey, the president of the Brooklyn Dodgers who signed Jackie Robinson. Jones graduated from Elmira College. She married Thomas Lipscomb on August 22, 1981.

== Career ==
=== Primetime TV and film ===
Jones first appeared in the 1975 film Cooley High, and later the TV series City of Angels ("Palm Springs Answer," 1976) and Serpico ("The Deadly Game," 1976). She also appeared in Woody Allen's Annie Hall in 1977 as Dorrie, and in Stealing Home as Grace Chandler in 1988. Other film appearances include Wild Thing (1987), Minotaur (1997) and Gang of Roses (2003).

Jones portrayed Sarah Jackson in the 1993 CBS miniseries Queen, and appeared on shows including A Man Called Hawk ("Hear No Evil," 1989), Lifestories: Families in Crisis ("The Secret Life of Mary Margaret: Portrait of a Bulimic," 1992), Law & Order ("Burden," 1998), Law & Order: Criminal Intent ("The Third Horseman," 2002; "Monster," 2003), Now and Again ("Fire and Ice," 2000) and Third Watch ("Just Another Night at the Opera," 2000). Jones also appeared as Fey Sommers (in flashbacks) on the ABC series Ugly Betty in 2006.

=== Daytime ===
Jones is also known for her work on several daytime operas.

She portrayed the unhinged Janice Frame on the NBC soap opera Another World from 1978 to 1980, and again in 1989. That role was her second appearance on the show; she had appeared as Amy Gifford in 1977, a character that was then sent to sister soap Lovers and Friends.

In 1981, Jones played Victoria Lord on One Life to Live when actress Erika Slezak was on maternity leave, returning again for one episode in 1983. Jones later portrayed Pamela Stuart on One Life to Live from 1985 to 1987, making returns in 1988, 2001 (for one of Asa Buchanan's fake funerals, right after playing the unnamed socialite who dumped David Vickers as her "kept man"), 2008, and a final appearance in 2009, when her character was murdered. Jones had a long association with, and ultimately played three roles on the show (including nurse Sheila Rafferty in 1975 and 1976).

Other daytime appearances include Catsy Kirkland on Ryan's Hope from 1982 to 1983 and Christina Robertson on Rituals from 1984 to 1985. She also filled in for Jane Elliot as General Hospital's Tracy Quartermaine in 1989.

== Filmography ==
=== Film ===
Year	Title	Role	Notes
1975	Cooley High	Sandra	
1977	Annie Hall	Dorrie	
1987	Wild Thing	Laurie	
1988	Stealing Home	Grace Chandler	
1997	Minotaur	Thea's mother	Israel release
1998	Meet Joe Black	Miriam	Uncredited role
2003	Gang of Roses	Brenda	
2003	Shortcut to Happiness a/k/a The Devil and Daniel Webster	Woman	Film was made in 2001 but in 2003 was released only at select film festivals. After finishing post-production, in 2007 it was released in major theatres.
2008	The Drum Beats Twice	Mother Superior	

=== Video Games ===
Year	Title	Role	Notes
1994	99.2: A SpyQuest Adventure	Russia agent	Voice only

=== Television ===
Year	Title	Role	Notes
1975-1976	One Life to Live	Nurse Sheila Rafferty	Daytime serial (recurring role)
1976	City of Angels	Barbara Thornberry	Episode: "Palm Springs Answer"
1976	Serpico	Kim	Episode: "The Deadly Game"
1977	Another World	Amy Gifford Cushing	Character originated on Another World and then transferred to sister soap For Richer, For Poorer
1977	Lovers and Friends a/k/a For Richer, For Poorer (see nmotes)	Amy Gifford Cushing	Daytime serial (contract role) Daytime serial known as Lovers and Friends from 1/3/1977-5/6/1977 before being placed on hiatus; from 12/6/1977-9/29/1978 it aired under the title For Richer, For Poorer until the show's cancellation
1978-1980; 1989	Another World	Janice Frame Cory #2	Daytime serial (contract 1979-1980; guest 1989)
1981; 1983	One Life to Live	Victoria "Viki" Lord Gordon Riley Burke Buchanan Carpenter Davidson Banks #3	Daytime serial (temporary replacement for Erika Slezak)
1980	Number 96	Lisa Brendon	Episode: "Roger Moves In"
1982-1983	Ryan's Hope	Catsy Kirkland	Daytime serial (recurring role)
1984-1985	Rituals	Christina Thompson Robertson	Nighttime serial (shown only in syndication)
1985-1987; 1988; 2001; 2008. 2009	One Life to Live	Pamela Reed Stuart Buchanan O'Neill	Daytime serial (contract role 1985-1987; guest role 1988, 2001, 2008 & 2009)
1989	A Man Called Hawk	Helen	Episode: "Hear No Evil"
1989	General Hospital	Tracy Quartermaine Williams Ashton Hornsby Soleito Zacchara Spencer	Daytime serial (temporary replacement for Jane Elliot)
1992	Lifestories: Families in Crisis	Mrs. Carter	Episode: "The Secret Life of Mary-Margaret: Portrait of a Bulimic"
1993	Queen	Sarah Jackson (2 episodes)	Television 3-part miniseries (CBS); Episode: "Part I"; Episode: "Part III"
1998	Law & Order	Stapleton	Episode: "Burden"
2000	Now and Again	Melanie	Episode: "Fure and Ice"
2000	Third Watch	Deborah	Episode: "Just Another Night at the Opera"
2000	Sex and the City	Upper East Side Woman	Episode: "Attack of the Five Foot Ten Woman"
2000	The Dooley and Pals Show	Polly	Series regular (22 episodes)
2002-2003	Law & Order: Criminal Intent	Mrs. Griscom	Episode: "The Third Horseman" (2002)
2002-2003	Law & Order: Criminal Intent	Laura Dietrich	Episode: "Monster" (2003)
2006	Ugly Betty	Fey Sommers	Episode: "Pilot"; Episode: "The Box and the Bunny" (uncredited in episode)
