= Vicky Dawson =

American actress (born 1961)

- Dawson in a 1976 publicity still
- Born: July 5, 1961 (age 65); Columbus, Ohio, U.S.
- Occupation: Actress
- Years active: 1973–present
- Spouse: Greg Irvine
- Children: 3

Vicky Dawson (born July 5, 1961) is an American film and television actress. She portrayed the lead role of Pam MacDonald in the slasher film The Prowler (1981). She also starred in the television drama film Breaking Up (1978) opposite Lee Remick.

Her television roles included a main role on NBC's Lovers and Friends, as well as recurring roles on the soap operas Another World and As the World Turns.

== Early life ==
Dawson was born in Columbus, Ohio, and raised in Summit, New Jersey, one of three daughters born to Elizabeth and John Franklin Dawson. She graduated from Summit High School and later attended New York University.

== Career ==
Dawson began acting as an adolescent, appearing in television commercials for Coca-Cola and Hershey Chocolate. In 1973, she had a supporting role opposite Jodie Foster in the ABC Afterschool Special "Rookie of the Year". In 1977, she had a lead role as part of the main cast of the NBC television series Lovers and Friends, opposite Richard Backus. She also starred in the television film The Four of Us, playing the daughter of a widowed mother (played by Barbara Feldon) raising her three children.

In 1978 she starred in the television drama film Breaking Up, portraying the daughter of a woman (played by Lee Remick) whose husband walks out on their marriage. The same year, she had a recurring role as Eileen Simpson on the soap opera Another World, portraying the love interest of Joey Perrini (played by Ray Liotta). In 1979, she starred as part of a seven-person repertory company on Hot Hero Sandwich, an NBC television series.

Dawson had her first lead film role in Joseph Zito's slasher film The Prowler (1981), portraying a college student stalked by a killer during a graduation party. She followed this with a supporting role in the comedy film Carbon Copy (also 1981), portraying the younger stepsister of a teenage boy (Denzel Washington) who discovers the identity of his biological father.

Beginning in 1982, Dawson had a recurring guest role as Dee Stewart on the soap opera As the World Turns.

== Personal life ==
Dawson is married to Greg Irvine, and has three children.

== Filmography ==
=== Film ===
Year	Title	Role	Notes	Ref.
1977	The Four of Us	Chrissie		
1978	Breaking Up	Amy Hammil	Television film	
1981	The Prowler	Pam MacDonald		
1981	Carbon Copy	Mary Ann Whitney		
1989	Those She Left Behind	Mrs. Kroyer	Television film	
2019	Toxicity	Rose Larkin		
2020	About Hope	Martha		
2021	Amazon Queen	Maggie Chambers		

=== Television ===
Year	Title	Role	Notes	Ref.
1973	ABC Afterschool Special	Laura	Episode: "Rookie of the Year"	
1975	ABC Afterschool Special	Lisa	Episode: "It Must Be Love, 'Cause I Feel So Dumb"	
1975	Go	Sybil Luddington	1 episode	
1976	Ryan's Hope	Laurie	1 episode	
1977	Lovers and Friends	Tessa Saxon	Original cast	
1978	Special Treat	Janine	Episode: "Snowbound"	
1978–1989	Another World	Eileen Simpson Perrini	10 episodes	
1979–1980	Hot Hero Sandwich	Reparatory Cast Member	Main cast	
1982	ABC Afterschool Special	Jen	Episode: "Sometimes I Don't Love My Mother"	
1982–1986	As the World Turns	Dee Stewart	5 episodes	

== Sources ==
- Terrace, Vincent (2007). Encyclopedia of Television Subjects, Themes and Settings. Jefferson, North Carolina: McFarland & Company. p. 298. ISBN 978-0-786-42498-6.
- Terrace, Vincent (2009). Encyclopedia of Television Shows, 1925 Through 2007: A-E. Jefferson, North Carolina: McFarland & Company. ISBN 978-0-786-43305-6.
- Terrace, Vincent (2024). Television Specials: 3,201 Entertainment Spectaculars, 1939 through 1993. Jefferson, North Carolina: McFarland & Company. ISBN 978-1-476-61144-0.
