= Len Millar =

Australian rules footballer

Personal information
- Full name: Leonard George Millar
- Born: 8 April 1926
- Died: 18 April 1996 (aged 70)
- Original team: Moe
- Height: 183 cm (6 ft 0 in)
- Weight: 76 kg (168 lb)

Playing career^{1}
Years	Club	Games (Goals)
1947–48	St Kilda	23 (2)
- ^{1} Playing statistics correct to the end of 1948.

Leonard George Millar (8 April 1926 – 18 April 1996) was an Australian rules footballer who played with St Kilda in the Victorian Football League (VFL).
