= Travis Sentell =

- Search for Tomorrow character
- Rod Arrants and Sherry Mathis as Travis and Liza Sentell
- Portrayed by: Rod Arrants
- First appearance: 1978
- Last appearance: 1984
- Created by: Bill Corrington; Joyce Corrington
- Introduced by: Mary-Ellis Bunim
In-universe information
- Occupation: Businessman and owner of Tourneur Instruments
- Father: Rusty Sentell, Sr.
- Mother: Mignon Sentell
- Wife: Liza Walton Sentell
- Sons: Tourneur Stuart Martin Sentell
- Uncles: Martin Tourneur
- First cousins: Lee Sentell

Rusty "Travis" Tourneur Sentell, Jr. is a character from the American soap opera Search for Tomorrow, portrayed by actor Rod Arrants from 1978 to 1984.

== Appearances ==
Created by Bill Corrington and Joyce Corrington, Travis was portrayed by Rod Arrants from 1978 to 1984.

== Storylines ==
The son of Rusty Sentell, Sr. (David Gale), and his wife, Mignon (Anita Keal), Travis is a wealthy businessman who brings his family's corporation, Tourneur Instruments, into the fictional community of Henderson in 1978. He is immediately smitten by Liza Kaslo (Sherry Mathis), who had just lost her husband, Steve, to leukemia. After her mother, Janet (Millee Taggart), refuses to bankroll Steve's rock opera on the advice of her legal team, Travis offers to do so. He and Liza eventually fall in love and experience dangerous adventures in locales like New Orleans and Jamaica, and in Hong Kong on the ocean liner Queen Elizabeth 2. Travis and Liza marry, but his enemies are always around somewhere, and so their lives are constantly in danger. Travis also contends with his supposedly deceased father, who is furious that he is married to Liza and wants Travis to marry his goddaughter, Aja Doyan (Susan Monts). Travis and Liza also try to adopt his cousin Lee's (Doug Stevenson) son, Roger Lee, but are thwarted by Lee's wife, waitress Cissie Mitchell Sentell (Patsy Pease). Eventually, they have a son, Tourneur Stuart Martin Sentell. Travis is eventually killed in a mysterious boat explosion in 1984.

== Impact ==
Travis and Liza "dominated" the series during their run, and their action-adventure storylines attempted to emulate the success of the Luke and Laura story on General Hospital. The characters were considered a supercouple, and Arrants' popularity as Travis earned him a cover story in the August 11, 1979 issue of TV Guide.
