= Chester Gray =

American baseball player (1914–1996)

- Catcher
- Born: January 8, 1914; Union City, Tennessee, U.S.
- Died: April 18, 1996 (aged 82); Ann Arbor, Michigan, U.S.
- Batted: Left Threw: Right

Negro league baseball debut
- 1940, for the St. Louis–New Orleans Stars

Last appearance
- 1945, for the Kansas City Monarchs
- Stats at Baseball Reference

Teams
- St. Louis–New Orleans Stars (1940); New York Black Yankees (1942); Harrisburg–St. Louis Stars (1943); Kansas City Monarchs (1945)

Chesley Gray (January 8, 1914 – April 18, 1996), nicknamed "Chester", was an American Negro league catcher in the 1940s.

A native of Union City, Tennessee, Gray made his Negro leagues debut in 1940 with the St. Louis–New Orleans Stars. He went on to play for the New York Black Yankees, and finished his career with the Kansas City Monarchs in 1945, where he played alongside Baseball Hall of Famer Jackie Robinson. Gray died in Ann Arbor, Michigan in 1996 at age 82.
