= George Batson =

Australian rules footballer, born 1912

Personal information
- Full name: George Batson
- Born: 3 November 1912
- Died: 29 April 1996 (aged 83)
- Original team: Warragul

Playing career^{1}
Years	Club	Games (Goals)
1933	St Kilda	4 (1)
- ^{1} Playing statistics correct to the end of 1933.

George Batson (3 November 1912 – 29 April 1996) was an Australian rules footballer who played with St Kilda in the Victorian Football League (VFL).
