= Ape (1976 film) =

A*P*E
- Korean theatrical release poster
- Hangul: 킹콩의 대역습
- Hanja: 킹콩의 大逆襲
- RR: Kingkongui daeyeokseup
- MR: K'ingk'ongŭi taeyŏksŭp
- Directed by: Paul Leder
- Written by: Paul Leder; Richard Leder
- Produced by: K.M. Yeung; Paul Leder
- Starring: Joanna Kerns; Rod Arrants; Alex Nicol
- Cinematography: Daniel Symmes; Tony Francis
- Edited by: Paul Leder
- Music by: Bruce Mac Rae; Chung Min Sup
- Production companies: Kukje Movies; Lee Ming Film Co.
- Distributed by: Worldwide Entertainment
- Release dates: July 23, 1976 (South Korea); October 1, 1976 (U.S.)
- Running time: 87 minutes
- Countries: South Korea; United States
- Language: English
- Budget: $23,000

A*P*E, released in South Korea as King Kong's Great Counterattack (Korean: 킹콩의 대역습; RR: Kingkongui daeyeokseup), is a 1976 monster film. An international co-production between South Korea and the United States, the film was produced by Kukje Movies and the Lee Ming Film Co. (South Korea) and Worldwide Entertainment (U.S.), and was shot in 3-D using the Space-Vision process. Directed by Paul Leder and featuring special effects by Park Kwang Nam, the film stars Joanna Kerns, Rod Arrants and Alex Nicol. It marked an early film appearance by Kerns, later known for her work in television.

A*P*E was released at approximately the same time as Dino De Laurentiis' 1976 remake of King Kong. The film is regarded by some critics as a Z movie. In later years, the film was released under the titles Attack of the Giant Horny Gorilla (for its 1982 re-release on the grindhouse circuit) and Hideous Mutant (for its original home video release).

== Plot ==
A 36-foot-gorilla escapes from an oil tanker off the coast of South Korea. After battling with a giant great white shark, the ape reaches land. Shortly after, actress Marilyn Baker arrives in Korea to shoot a film, followed by her lover and journalist Tom. As the United States Military begins receiving reports of sightings of an unknown creature, the commanding officers initially dismiss them as nonsense. They rationalize the evidence, such as giant footprints, as being the work of the film production, joking someone should ask the creature if its name is "King Kong". The ape fights a giant python before a confrontation with archers, who attack but are unable to kill the massive primate. The U.S. military, consulting with Captain Kim of the South Korean Police, become convinced the reports are genuine. However, the officers cover up the truth from the media as Tom prods for answers.

Tom drops by the film set as Marilyn is filming a rape scene; he warns her after a cut that the ape is still at large and has killed people. Though she is skeptical of their relationship and his seriousness, they kiss. As the ape destroys entire villages, the military forcibly evacuates rural areas, and refugees flood the cities. The ape then emerges onto the filming location, where Marilyn, running as part of her performance, unwittingly lands into its paw. It carries her into the mountains, and the army gives Colonel Davis orders to capture the beast alive.

While the prehistoric creature battles helicopters, destroying a handful and giving the others the middle finger, Tom rescues Marilyn. The monster then enters Seoul, following Tom and Marilyn, and begins damaging buildings. After the creature kidnaps Marilyn again, tanks and increased firepower bring the beast down, and Tom and Marilyn are reunited.

== Cast ==
- Rod Arrants as Tom Rose
- Joanna Kerns as Marilyn Baker
- Alex Nicol as Colonel Davis
- Lee Nak-hoon as Captain Kim
- Yeon-jeong Woo as Mrs. Kim
- Jerry Harke as Lt. Smith
- Larry Chandler as First Mate
- Walt Myers as Seaman
- J.J. Gould as Soldier in Jeep
- Charles Johnson as American Tourist
- Paul Leder as Dino
- Choi Sung Kwan as Film Producer
- Bob Kurcz as American Actor
- Jules Levey as Reporter
- Josh Luckritz as School Child #1
- Park Kwang Nam as Ape

== Production ==
U.S. theatrical poster for A*P*E.

A*P*E was an expedited production meant to capitalize on the upcoming release of Dino DeLaurentis' King Kong (1976). The entire budget for A*P*E was $23,000 and the special effects budget for the miniature buildings was only $1,200. The film was shot in just 14 days. Several plot elements, such as a giant gorilla's relationship with an American actress, are essentially lifted from the King Kong story.

When the film was going into production in February 1976, it was announced as The New King Kong and was advertised as such via a teaser poster in Boxoffice magazine. When RKO Pictures discovered this, they filed a $1.5 million lawsuit against A*P*E's production company. The title of the film was subsequently changed to Super Ape in June 1976, then to A*P*E on October 1, 1976, and the tagline "Not to be confused with King Kong" was added to the theatrical posters and movie trailer. However, the company still managed to use King Kong's name, not only in its native South Korea, but also in some international markets, where the film was known as Super King Kong and King Kong Returns, respectively.

The film's title A*P*E is jokingly explained as an abbreviation of "Attacking Primate monstEr", with the deliberate intention to spoof the acronym title of M*A*S*H, a popular 1970 film and subsequent 1972–1983 television series that was set in Korea, where A*P*E was produced.

In one scene, the movie pitted the titular giant ape against a huge great white shark, meant as a spoof on Jaws, a movie about a giant shark made a year earlier. In August 1978, the cover of Famous Monsters magazine referenced the scene.

A*P*E was released theatrically in North America in October 1976, merely two months before the release of King Kong.

== Reception ==
In a contemporary review from October 4, 1976, Gene Siskel of the Chicago Tribune called the film "exactly what the annoying television ads make it out to be—a cheap Korean-made picture attempting to cash in on the new, multimillion-dollar 'King Kong' film due at Christmas." He added that "we never see the monster stand next to any people, because that would give away the monster's actual size as it rips apart a rubber shark, model boat, model helicopter, and cardboard town." He later put it on his list of the worst films released in Chicago during 1976.

Much of the commentary on A*P*E focuses on the film's low-quality special effects. For example, John Wilson, creator of the Golden Raspberry Awards, claims that the ape suit used in the film "looks more like your grandmother's lamb's wool coat collar than an actual simian." He also remarks that "a five-year old could spot the [model buildings and vehicles] as phony." Wilson also describes the film's music as "one of the worst movie soundtracks of all time." Other critics have noted that the size of the ape appears to change throughout the film, and that the ape actor's T-shirt is visible through holes in his costume. At one point, the ape throws a snake at the camera and "the snake hits the camera, making it shake."

Monster movie critic Mike Bogue stated, "A*P*E may not be the worst giant monster movie ever made, but it would have to chart high on any Top Ten Worst list." Citing elements such as the ape vomiting and dancing to the film's score, Bogue states that "as the genre magazine Castle of Frankenstein used to say in its movie reviews, this one is so bad it has to be seen to be disbelieved."

In reviewing A*P*E, along with other King Kong parodies, Roy Morton states that the film "quickly degenerates into a dreadfully campy spoof." He speculates that on realizing the low quality of their production, the producers deliberately tried to make an already bad film worse in the hope that moviegoers would laugh with them, instead of at them. To that end, Morton states that while cinematically inferior to The Mighty Peking Man (1977), A*P*E does have an "it's so bad it's good" cult film appeal the aforementioned film lacks. Nevertheless, he closes his review stating that the scene where the ape looks directly at the audience and gives everyone watching its movie "the finger" sums up the entire film.
