= I Dismember Mama =

- Theatrical release poster
- Directed by: Paul Leder
- Written by: William W. Norton
- Produced by: Leon Roth
- Starring: Zooey Hall; Geri Reischl
- Cinematography: William Swenning
- Edited by: Justin DuPont
- Music by: Herschel Burke Gilbert
- Production company: Romal Films
- Distributed by: Valiant Pictures
- Release dates: October 18, 1972 (Kansas City, world premiere)
- Running time: 81 minutes
- Country: United States
- Language: English

I Dismember Mama (also known as Poor Albert and Little Annie and released in the UK as Crazed), is a 1972 American horror film written by William Norton and directed by Paul Leder. The film centers on a violent sex criminal who goes on a killing spree while watching over the daughter of one of his victims. During its original theatrical release, patrons were given free paper "Up Chuck Cups" with the purchase of a ticket. There is a well-known US trailer advertising a double feature of this film paired with the 1972 horror film The Blood Spattered Bride which was filmed in the style of a news report covering the "story" of an audience member who had gone insane while watching the films. The title is a pun on the famous play I Remember Mama; however, the film is not comedic in tone.

== Plot ==
Albert once tried to kill his rich, snobbish mother, for which he was institutionalized. The low-security hospital he was sent to, however, is not prepared to deal with the extent of his problems. Obsessed with hatred for his mother, Albert is dangerously violent toward all women and attacks a nurse, after which his doctor decides to send him to a high-security state institution. Albert easily escapes by murdering an orderly and the police put his mother in hiding after he phones her and threatens her. When Albert returns to his mother's home, he finds her housekeeper Alice, whom he tortures and murders.

When Alice's 9-year-old daughter Annie returns home from school, Albert immediately takes a liking to her and tells her that her mother has gone to the hospital and left him to take care of Annie while she is away. Albert reverts to a childlike persona and they immediately form a friendship, playing games, talking and laughing together. Albert takes Annie on a day of activities like riding paddleboats and a small train; that night he takes her to a hotel where they conduct a mock wedding ritual. Albert considers Annie to be a pure "woman" and believes he truly loves her.

When his sexual attraction to her manifests itself while she is sleeping, Albert goes out and picks up a woman in a bar and brings her back to the hotel room. His bizarre sadism re-emerges and he murders the woman, but Annie wakes up and sees it happening. She screams and escapes out of a window, climbing down the fire escape as Albert chases after her. They run into a mannequin factory, where Annie attempts to hide among the figures. Albert sees her, envisions her wearing makeup like a harlot, and decides she is just like all the other women after all. When he attempts to kill her with a cleaver, Annie defends herself by pushing Albert with one of the mannequins. Albert falls backwards out of a fourth story window onto the concrete below. The police arrive moments later and comfort Annie as Albert lies dying on the ground.

== Cast ==
- Zooey Hall as Albert
- Geri Reischl as Annie
- Joanne Moore Jordan as Mrs. Robertson
- Greg Mullavey as Detective
- Marlene Tracy as Alice
- Frank Whiteman as Dr. Burton
- Elaine Partnow as Nurse
- Rosella Olsen as Girl in poolroom
- Robert Christopher as Man in poolroom
- James Tartan as Attendant

== Production ==
I Dismember Mama was directed by exploitation filmmaker Paul Leder. Principal photography began in 1972 under the title Poor Albert and Little Annie, with a planned release date that same year.

== Release ==
=== Home media ===
The film made its DVD debut on April 21, 2009, and was released by Substance.

=== Critical response ===
TV Guide panned the film calling the film's production "shabby" but also noted that actor Zooey Hall's performance as Albert as "interesting". Author and independent filmmaker John Kenneth Muir awarded the film one out of a possible four stars, commenting that, although the performances were solid and it was technically well made, the film's theme of pedophilia went too far, to the point of being exploitative. On this theme, Muir wrote, "I Dismember Mama makes one feel dirty about watching because its main concern is not just violence, but sex. The film makes it plain that Albert sees little Annie as a possible sexual conquest, and that is really disturbing thing to see in a film with no aspirations to be anything but entertainment." Joseph A. Ziemba from Bleeding Skull! gave the film a negative review, writing, "I Dismember Mama is somewhat suspenseful and definitely bizarre. However, given the subject matter and so-so execution, it’s not something I’d ever want to see again." Blockbuster Inc.'s Guide to Movies and Videos rated the film one out of four stars, calling it "junk".

== See also ==
- List of American films of 1972
