= Paul Leder =

American actor (1926–1996)

Paul Leder (March 25, 1926 – April 9, 1996) was an American film director, writer and producer. He is most famous today for his films A*P*E and I Dismember Mama. With wife Etyl Leder, he is the father of modern-day producer and director Mimi Leder, writer Reuben Leder, and casting director Geraldine Leder. Paul Leder died of lung cancer on April 8, 1996, at age 70.

== Early career ==
Leder launched his career singing through radio on The Molly Goldberg Show. During World War II, Leder was an Army medic who served under George Patton and assisted the survivors of the Buchenwald concentration camp. After the war, Leder hit Broadway, singing and dancing opposite Phil Silvers in Top Banana. More shows followed. He made his feature film debut as an actor in The Grass Eater (1961), which he also produced. Leder made his first directorial effort in the dismal comedy The Marigold Man (1970).

== Later years ==
Outside of filmmaking, Leder was a peace and nuclear disarmament activist. His last film was the black comedy The Wacky Adventures of Dr. Boris and Nurse Shirley (1995). In addition to his film work, Leder also wrote and directed plays in Los Angeles. Leder died of lung cancer on April 8, 1996.

Paul Leder was honored at the end of the ER episode "Fire in the Belly" (season 2, episode 19), as well as the end of his daughter Mimi Leder's film The Peacemaker. The 1999 short film Sentimental Journey celebrated the romance of Etyl and Paul Leder.

== Filmography ==
=== Actor ===
- The Grass Eater (1961) starring Rue McClanahan
- Five Minutes to Love (1963)
- How to Succeed with Girls (1964)
- The Farmer's Other Daughter (1965)
- A*P*E (1976)

=== Director ===
- Marigold Man (1970)
- I Dismember Mama (1972) aka Poor Albert and Little Annie
- My Friends Need Killing (1976)
- A*P*E (1976) a USA/South Korean co-production filmed in 3-D
- Red Light in the White House (1977)
- The Chinese Caper (1978)
- Sketches of a Strangler (1978)
- I'm Going to Be Famous (1983)
- Vultures (1984)
- The Education of Allison Tate (1986)
- The Eleventh Commandment (1986)
- Body Count (1987)
- Goin' to Chicago (1990)
- Twenty Dollar Star (1990)
- Murder by Numbers (1990)
- Frame Up (1991)
- Frame-Up II: The Cover-Up (1992)
- Exiled in America (1992)
- The Baby Doll Murders (1993)
- Killing Obsession (1994)
- Molly & Gina (1994)
- The Wacky Adventures of Dr. Boris and Nurse Shirley (1995)
- The Killers Within (1997)
