= List of American films of 1984 =

This is a list of American films released in 1984.

== Box office ==
The highest-grossing American films released in 1984, by domestic box office gross revenue, are as follows:

Highest-grossing films of 1984
Rank	Title	Distributor	Domestic gross
1	Ghostbusters	Columbia	$229,242,989
2	Beverly Hills Cop	Paramount	$224,760,478
3	Indiana Jones and the Temple of Doom	Paramount	$179,870,271
4	Gremlins	Warner Bros.	$153,083,102
5	The Karate Kid	Columbia	$90,815,558
6	Police Academy	Warner Bros.	$81,198,894
7	Footloose	Paramount	$80,035,402
8	Romancing the Stone	20th Century Fox	$76,572,238
9	Star Trek III: The Search for Spock	Paramount	$76,471,076
10	Splash	Buena Vista	$69,821,334

== January–March ==
Opening		Title	Production company	Cast and crew	Ref.
J A N U A R Y	13	Angel	New World Pictures	Robert Vincent O'Neill (director/screenplay); Joseph Michael Cala (screenplay); Cliff Gorman, Susan Tyrrell, Dick Shawn, Rory Calhoun, Donna Wilkes, John Diehl, Elaine Giftos, Mel Carter, David Underwood, Ken Olfson, Peter Jason, Ross Hagen, Dick Valentine, Marc Hayashi, Bob Gorman, Todd Hoffman, Donna McDaniel, Graem McGavin, Steven M. Porter, David Anthony, Josh Cadman, Greg Lewis, Karyn Parker, Dennis Kort, Gene Ross, Jackie De Rouen, Laura Sorrenson, Joseph Michael Cala, Donna Fuller, Robert Acey, Christian Dante	
J A N U A R Y	13	Hot Dog…The Movie	MGM/UA	Peter Markle (director); Mike Marvin (screenplay); David Naughton, Patrick Houser, Tracy N. Smith, John Patrick Neger, Frank Koppola, Shannon Tweed, James Saito, George Theobald, Mark Vance, Eric Watson, Lynn Wieland, Peter Vogt, Robert Fuhrmann, David Chilton, Sandy Hackett, Crystal Smith	
J A N U A R Y	20	The Buddy System	20th Century Fox	Glenn A. Jordan (director); Mary Agnes Donoghue (screenplay); Richard Dreyfuss, Susan Sarandon, Nancy Allen, Jean Stapleton, Wil Wheaton, Edward Winter, Keene Curtis, Milton Selzer, F. William Parker	
J A N U A R Y	26	And the Ship Sails On	Triumph Films	Federico Fellini (director/screenplay); Tonino Guerra (screenplay); Freddie Jones, Barbara Jefford, Peter Cellier, Elisa Mainardi, Norma West, Paolo Paoloni, Pina Bausch, Philip Locke, Jonathan Cecil, Maurice Barrier, Fred Williams, Janet Suzman, Mara Zampieri, Elizabeth Norberg Schulz, Boris Carmeli, Franco Angrisano, Ugo Fangareggi, Victor Poletti, Sarah-Jane Varley, Fiorenzo Serra, Pasquale Zito, Linda Polan, Elizabeth Kaza, Antonio Vezza, Nucci Condò, Giovanni Bavaglio, Carlo Di Giacomo, Umberto Barone	
J A N U A R Y	27	Broadway Danny Rose	Orion Pictures	Woody Allen (director/screenplay); Woody Allen, Mia Farrow, Nick Apollo Forte, Sandy Baron, Corbett Monica, Jackie Gayle, Morty Gunty, Will Jordan, Howard Storm, Gloria Parker, Jack Rollins, Milton Berle, Howard Cosell, Joe Franklin, Gerald Schoenfeld, Paul Greco, Frank Renzulli, Craig Vandenburgh, Herb Reynolds, Edwin Bordo, Gina DeAngelis	
J A N U A R Y	27	The Lonely Guy	Universal Pictures / Aspen Film Society	Arthur Hiller (director); Ed. Weinberger, Stan Daniels, Neil Simon (screenplay); Steve Martin, Charles Grodin, Judith Ivey, Steve Lawrence, Robyn Douglass, Merv Griffin, Joyce Brothers, Julie K. Payne, Roger Robinson, Nicholas Mele, Loni Anderson	
J A N U A R Y	27	El Norte	PBS / American Playhouse / Channel Four Films / Independent Productions / Island Alive / Cinecom International /	Gregory Nava (director/screenplay); Anna Thomas (screenplay); Zaide Silvia Gutiérrez, David Villalpando, Ernesto Gómez Cruz, Alicia del Lago, Lupe Ontiveros, Trinidad Silva, Enrique Castillo, Tony Plana, Diane Cary, Mike Gomez	
F E B R U A R Y	3	Reckless	MGM/UA	James Foley (director); Chris Columbus (screenplay); Aidan Quinn, Daryl Hannah, Kenneth McMillan, Cliff De Young, Lois Smith, Adam Baldwin, Dan Hedaya, Billy Jayne, Toni Kalem, Jennifer Grey, Haviland Morris, Pamela Springsteen	
F E B R U A R Y	10	Unfaithfully Yours	20th Century Fox	Howard Zieff (director); Valerie Curtin, Barry Levinson, Robert Klane (screenplay); Dudley Moore, Nastassja Kinski, Armand Assante, Cassie Yates, Richard Libertini, Albert Brooks, Richard B. Shull, Jan Triska, Leonard Mann, Betty Shabazz, Jane Hallaren, Bernard Behrens,	
F E B R U A R Y	17	Blame It on Rio	20th Century Fox	Stanley Donen (director); Charlie Peters, Larry Gelbart (screenplay); Michael Caine, Joseph Bologna, Valerie Harper, Michelle Johnson, Demi Moore, José Lewgoy, Lupe Gigliotti, Nelson Dantas	
F E B R U A R Y	17	Crackers	Universal Pictures	Louis Malle (director); Jeffrey Fiskin (screenplay); Donald Sutherland, Jack Warden, Sean Penn, Wallace Shawn, Larry Riley, Trinidad Silva, Christine Baranski, Tasia Valenza, Edouard DeSoto	
F E B R U A R Y	17	Footloose	Paramount Pictures IndieProd Company ProductionsPhoenix Pictures / IndieProd Company Productions	Herbert Ross (director); Dean Pitchford (screenplay); Kevin Bacon, Lori Singer, Dianne Wiest, John Lithgow, Chris Penn, Sarah Jessica Parker, John Laughlin, Elizabeth Gorcey, Frances Lee McCain, Jim Youngs, Douglas Dirkson, Lynne Marta, Arthur Rosenberg, Timothy Scott, Brian Wimmer	
F E B R U A R Y	17	Lassiter	Warner Bros.	Roger Young (director); David Taylor (screenplay); Tom Selleck, Jane Seymour, Lauren Hutton, Bob Hoskins, Joe Regalbuto, Ed Lauter, Warren Clarke, Edward Peel, Christopher Malcolm, Peter Skellern, Harry Towb, Belinda Mayne, W. Morgan Sheppard, Brian Coburn, David Warbeck, Nicholas Bond-Owen	
F E B R U A R Y	24	Preppies	Platinum Pictures / The Playboy Channel	Chuck Vincent (director/screenplay); Rick Marx (screenplay); Dennis Drake, Steven Holt, Peter Brady Reardon, Nitchie Barrett, Cindy Manion, Katie Stelletello	
M A R C H	2	Against All Odds	Columbia Pictures	Taylor Hackford (director); Eric Hughes (screenplay); Rachel Ward, Jeff Bridges, James Woods, Alex Karras, Jane Greer, Richard Widmark, Dorian Harewood, Swoosie Kurtz, Saul Rubinek, Pat Corley, Bill McKinney, Allen Williams, Sam Scarber, Jon St. Elwood, Jonathan Terry, Paul Valentine, Ted White, Kid Creole, Coati Mundi	
M A R C H	2	Harry & Son	Orion Pictures	Paul Newman (director/screenplay); Ronald L. Buck (screenplay); Paul Newman, Robby Benson, Ellen Barkin, Wilford Brimley, Judith Ivey, Ossie Davis, Morgan Freeman, Katherine Borowitz, Maury Chaykin, Joanne Woodward, Tom Nowicki, Bunny Yeager, Stan Barrett	
M A R C H	2	Repo Man	Universal Pictures / Edge City	Alex Cox (director/screenplay); Harry Dean Stanton, Emilio Estevez, Tracey Walter, Olivia Barash, Sy Richardson, Vonetta McGee, Susan Barnes, Fox Harris, Zander Schloss, Dick Rude, Miguel Sandoval, Helen Martin, The Circle Jerks, Richard Foronjy, Tom Finnegan, Del Zamora, Eddie Velez, Jennifer Balgobin	
M A R C H	2	Sahara	Metro-Goldwyn-Mayer / Golan-Globus / Cannon Group	Andrew McLaglen (director); James R. Silke (screenplay); Brooke Shields, Lambert Wilson, Horst Buchholz, John Rhys-Davies, Ronald Lacey, John Mills, Cliff Potts, Perry Lang, Terrence Hardiman, Steve Forrest, Tuvia Tavi	
M A R C H	2	This Is Spinal Tap	Embassy Pictures	Rob Reiner (director/screenplay); Christopher Guest, Michael McKean, Harry Shearer (screenplay); Christopher Guest, Michael McKean, Harry Shearer, Rob Reiner, June Chadwick, Tony Hendra, Bruno Kirby, R.J. Parnell, David Kaff, Ed Begley Jr., Danny Kortchmar, Fran Drescher, Patrick Macnee, Julie Payne, Dana Carvey, Sandy Helberg, Zane Buzby, Billy Crystal, Paul Benedict, Howard Hesseman, Paul Shortino, Lara Cody, Andrew J. Lederer, Russ Kunkel, Victory Tischler-Blue, Joyce Hyser, Gloria Gifford, Paul Shaffer, Archie Hahn, Charles Levin, Anjelica Huston, Donald Kendrick, Fred Willard, Wonderful Smith, Robert Bauer	
M A R C H	9	Children of the Corn	New World Pictures / Angeles Entertainment Group / Cinema Group / Hal Roach Studios / Inverness / Planet Productions	Fritz Kiersch (director); George Goldsmith (screenplay); Peter Horton, Linda Hamilton, R. G. Armstrong, John Franklin, Courtney Gains, Robby Kiger, Anne Marie McEvoy, Julie Maddalena, John Philbin, Jonas Marlowe	
M A R C H	9	The Hotel New Hampshire	Orion Pictures / Filmline Productions / The Producers' Circle / Woodfall Film Productions / Yellowbill Productions Ltd.	Tony Richardson (director/screenplay); Jodie Foster, Beau Bridges, Rob Lowe, Nastassja Kinski, Wilford Brimley, Paul McCrane, Wallace Shawn, Lisa Banes, Jennifer Dundas, Seth Green, Matthew Modine, Cali Timmins, Anita Morris, Amanda Plummer, Lorena Gale, Joely Richardson, Robert Thomas	
M A R C H	9	Mike's Murder	Warner Bros. / The Ladd Company	James Bridges (director/screenplay); Debra Winger, Mark Keyloun, Paul Winfield, Darrell Larson, Brooke Alderson, Robert Crosson, Daniel Shor, William Ostrander	
M A R C H	9	Pete's Dragon (re-release)	Walt Disney Pictures	Don Chaffey (director); Malcolm Marmorstein (screenplay); Helen Reddy, Jim Dale, Mickey Rooney, Red Buttons, Jeff Conaway, Shelley Winters, Jane Kean, Jim Backus, Sean Marshall, Charlie Callas, Charles Tyner, Gary Morgan, Cal Bartlett, Walter Barnes, Jack Collins, Robert Easton, Roger Price, Robert Foulk, Dennis Stewart, Al Checco, Henry Slate, Ben Wrigley, Joe Ross, Dinah Anne Rogers,	
M A R C H	9	Splash	Touchstone Pictures	Ron Howard (director); Lowell Ganz, Babaloo Mandel, Bruce Jay Friedman (screenplay); Tom Hanks, Daryl Hannah, John Candy, Eugene Levy, Jeff Doucette, David Knell, Royce D. Applegate, Dody Goodman, Howard Morris, Richard B. Shull, Shecky Greene, Bobby Di Cicco, Patrick Cronin, Tony Longo, Nora Denney, Joe Grifasi, Charles Macaulay, Lee Delano, Migdia Chinea Varela, Eileen Saki, Jodi Long, Patrick O'Rorke, Bill Smitrovich, Than Wyenn, Lowell Ganz, Babaloo Mandel, Rance Howard, Clint Howard, David Kreps, Shayla MacKarvich, Jason Late	
M A R C H	9	Voyage of the Rock Aliens	KGA/Interplanetary-Curb Communication / Inter Planetary	James Fargo, Bob Giraldi (directors); Edward Gold, James Guidotti (screenplay); Pia Zadora, Craig Sheffer, Tom Nolan, Ruth Gordon, Michael Berryman, Alison La Placa, Jermaine Jackson	
M A R C H	16	Tank	Universal Pictures / Lorimar Productions	Marvin J. Chomsky (director); Dan Gordon (screenplay); James Garner, G. D. Spradlin, Shirley Jones, C. Thomas Howell, Jenilee Harrison, James Cromwell, Dorian Harewood, Mark Herrier, Sandy Ward, John Hancock, Guy Boyd, Randy Bass	
M A R C H	23	Police Academy	Warner Bros. / The Ladd Company	Hugh Wilson (director/screenplay); Neal Israel, Pat Proft (screenplay); Steve Guttenberg, Kim Cattrall, Bubba Smith, Donovan Scott, David Graf, Michael Winslow, Marion Ramsey, Leslie Easterbrook, Andrew Rubin, G.W. Bailey, George Gaynes, Bruce Mahler, Brant von Hoffman, Scott Thomson, George R. Robertson, Debralee Scott, Ted Ross, Georgina Spelvin, Don Lake, Michael J. Reynolds, Joyce Gordon, Gary Farmer, John Hawkes, Kay Hawtrey, Dar Robinson, TJ Scott, Hugh Wilson	
M A R C H	23	Racing with the Moon	Paramount Pictures	Richard Benjamin (director); Steven Kloves (screenplay); Sean Penn, Elizabeth McGovern, Nicolas Cage, John Karlen, Rutanya Alda, Max Showalter, Bob Maroff, Crispin Glover, Barbara Howard, John Brandon, Eve Brent, Suzanne Adkinson, Shawn Schepps, Charles Miller, Pat Carroll, Al Hopson, Scott McGinnis, Kate Williamson, Michael Madsen, Dana Carvey, Michael Talbott, Carol Kane	
M A R C H	23	Slapstick of Another Kind	International Film Marketing	Steven Paul (director/screenplay); Jerry Lewis, Madeline Kahn, Marty Feldman, John Abbott, Jim Backus, Samuel Fuller, Merv Griffin, Pat Morita	
M A R C H	30	Greystoke: The Legend of Tarzan, Lord of the Apes	Warner Bros.	Hugh Hudson (director); P.H. Vazak, Michael Austin (screenplay); Ralph Richardson, Ian Holm, James Fox, Christopher Lambert, Andie MacDowell, Cheryl Campbell, Paul Geoffrey, Ian Charleson, Nigel Davenport, Nicholas Farrell, Richard Griffiths, Hilton McRae, David Suchet, John Wells, Paul Brooke, Ailsa Berk, Mak Wilson, Emil Abossolo-Mbo, Deep Roy, Tali McGregor, Peter Kyriakou, Danny Potts, Eric Langlois, Peter Elliott, John Alexander, Christopher Beck	
M A R C H	30	Misunderstood	MGM/UA	Jerry Schatzberg (director); Barra Grant (screenplay); Gene Hackman, Henry Thomas, Rip Torn, Huckleberry Fox, Maureen Kerwin, Susan Anspach, June Brown, Helen Ryan, Nadim Sawalha	
M A R C H	30	Purple Hearts	Warner Bros. / The Ladd Company	Sidney J. Furie (director/screenplay); Rick Natkin (screenplay); Ken Wahl, Cheryl Ladd, Stephen Lee, Annie McEnroe, Paul McCrane, Cyril O'Reilly, David Harris, Hillary Bailey, R. Lee Ermey, Drew Snyder, Lane Smith, James Whitmore Jr., Kevin Elders, Sydney Squire, David Bass, Rudy Nash	
M A R C H	30	Romancing the Stone	20th Century Fox	Robert Zemeckis (director); Diane Thomas (screenplay); Michael Douglas, Kathleen Turner, Danny DeVito, Alfonso Arau, Manuel Ojeda, Zack Norman, Holland Taylor, Mary Ellen Trainor, Kymberly Herrin, Ted White, Evita Muñoz, Eve Smith, Joe Nesnow, José Chávez, Camillo García, Rodrigo Puebla, Paco Morayta, Bill Burton	

== April–June ==
Opening		Title	Production company	Cast and crew	Ref.
A P R I L	6	Hard to Hold	Universal Pictures	Larry Peerce (director); Thomas Hedley Jr., Richard Rothstein (screenplay); Rick Springfield, Janet Eilber, Patti Hansen, Albert Salmi, Gregory Itzin, Peter Van Norden, Bill Mumy, Tony Fox Sales, Mike Baird, Robert "Pops" Popwell, Garry Goodrow, Selma Archerd, Paul Jenkins, Lew Gallo, John Blyth Barrymore, Laura Summer, Tiffany Helm, Al Hansen, Jack Stryker, Harry Northup, Stuart Charno, Eddie Hice, Monique Gabrielle, Lauren Koslow, Frank Pisani	
A P R I L	6	Moscow on the Hudson	Columbia Pictures	Paul Mazursky (director/screenplay); Leon Capetanos (screenplay); Robin Williams, María Conchita Alonso, Cleavant Derricks, Alejandro Rey, Savely Kramarov, Oleg Rudnik, Elya Baskin, Yakov Smirnoff	
A P R I L	6	The Stone Boy	20th Century Fox	Christopher Cain (director); Gina Berriault (screenplay); Robert Duvall, Jason Presson, Glenn Close, Susan Rinell, Dean Cain, Frederic Forrest, Cindy Fisher, Gail Youngs, Wilford Brimley, Mary Ellen Trainor, Linda Hamilton, Tom Waits	
A P R I L	6	Up the Creek	Orion Pictures / Samuel Z. Arkoff & Louis S. Arkoff Production	Robert Butler (director); Jim Kouf (screenplay); Tim Matheson, Dan Monahan, Stephen Furst, Jeff East, Sandy Helberg, Blaine Novak, James B. Sikking, Jennifer Runyon, John Hillerman, Jesse D. Goins, Julia Montgomery, Jeana Tomasino, Robert Costanzo, Frank Welker, Mark Andrews, Romy Windsor, Grant Wilson, Will Bledsoe, Ken Gibbel, Hap Lawrence	
A P R I L	6	Where the Boys Are '84	Tri-Star Pictures / ITC Productions	Hy Averback (director); Stu Krieger, Jeff Burkhart (screenplay); Lisa Hartman, Lorna Luft, Wendy Schaal, Howard McGillin, Lynn-Holly Johnson, Russell Todd, Alana Stewart, Christopher McDonald, Daniel McDonald, Louise Sorel, Jude Cole, George Coutoupis, Asher Brauner, Frank Zagarino, Dara Sedaka, Barry Marder	
A P R I L	13	Friday the 13th: The Final Chapter	Paramount Pictures	Joseph Zito (director); Barney Cohen (screenplay); Kimberly Beck, Peter Barton, Corey Feldman, E. Erich Anderson, Crispin Glover, Alan Hayes, Barbara Howard, Lawrence Monoson, Joan Freeman, Judie Aronson, Camilla More, Carey More, Bruce Mahler, Lisa Freeman, Bonnie Hellman, Ted White	
A P R I L	13	Iceman	Universal Studios	Fred Schepisi (director); John Drimmer, Chip Proser (screenplay); Timothy Hutton, Lindsay Crouse, John Lone, Josef Sommer, David Strathairn, Philip Akin, Danny Glover, Amelia Hall, Richard Monette, James Tolkan	
A P R I L	13	Kidco	20th Century Fox	Ronald F. Maxwell (director); Bennett Tramer (screenplay); Scott Schwartz, Clifton James, Charles Hallahan, Maggie Blye, Cinnamon Idles, Tristine Skyler, Elizabeth Gorcey, Basil Hoffman, Phil Rubenstein, Vincent Schiavelli, Mahlon Richmond, Allan Rich, Ron Rifkin, Benny Baker, Ken Magee, Marty Van Hoe	
A P R I L	13	Phar Lap	20th Century Fox	Simon Wincer (director); David Williamson (screenplay); Tom Burlinson, Towering Inferno, Richard Morgan, Robert Grubb, Martin Vaughan, Celia De Burgh, Ron Leibman, Henry Duvall, Pat Thomson, Georgia Carr, Judy Morris, James Steele, Vincent Ball, Redmond Phillips, Peter Whitford, John Stanton, Maggie Millar, Tim Robertson, Roger Newcombe, Tommy Woodcock, Len Kaserman, Paul Riley	
A P R I L	13	Swing Shift	Warner Bros.	Jonathan Demme (director); Nancy Dowd, Bo Goldman, Ron Nyswaner (screenplay); Goldie Hawn, Kurt Russell, Christine Lahti, Ed Harris, Fred Ward, Belita Moreno, Holly Hunter, Sudie Bond, Patty Maloney, Susan Peretz, Lisa Pelikan, Phillip Christon, Charles Napier, Alana Stewart	
A P R I L	20	Champions	Embassy Pictures	John Irvin (director); Evan Jones (screenplay); John Hurt, Edward Woodward, Jan Francis, Ben Johnson, Alison Steadman, Kirstie Alley, Ann Bell, Peter Barkworth, Judy Parfitt, Michael Byrne, Gregory Jones, Jonathan Newth, Andrew Wilde, Carolyn Pickles, Fiona Victory, Julie Adams, Hubert Rees, Edwin Richfield, Noel Dyson, John Woodnutt, Richard Leech, Mark Burns, Mark Lambert, Aldaniti, Fred Wood, Mick Dillon, Antony Carrick, Frank Mills, Richard Adams,	
A P R I L	27	Love Letters	New World Pictures	Amy Holden Jones (director/screenplay); Jamie Lee Curtis, James Keach, Bonnie Bartlett, Matt Clark, Amy Madigan, Brian Wood, Phil Coccioletti, Larry Cedar, Rance Howard, Jeff Doucette, Sally Kirkland, Lyman Ward, Bud Cort	
M A Y	4	Alphabet City	Atlantic Releasing Corporation	Amos Poe (director/screenplay); Gregory K. Heller, Robert Seidman (screenplay); Vincent Spano, Michael Winslow, Kate Vernon, Jami Gertz, Zohra Lampert, Raymond Serra, Kenny Marino, Tom Mardirosian, Clifton Powell, Tom Wright	
M A Y	4	The Bounty	Orion Pictures / Thorn EMI Screen Entertainment	Roger Donaldson (director); Robert Bolt (screenplay); Mel Gibson, Anthony Hopkins, Laurence Olivier, Edward Fox, Daniel Day-Lewis, Bernard Hill, Philip Davis, Liam Neeson, Wi Kuki Kaa, Tevaite Vernette, Philip Martin Brown, Simon Chandler, Malcolm Terris, John Sessions, Andrew Wilde, Neil Morrissey, Richard Graham, Dexter Fletcher, Pete Lee-Wilson, Jon Gadsby, Barry Dransfield, Steve Fletcher, Jack May	
M A Y	4	Breakin'	Cannon Films / Golan-Globus / MGM/UA	Joel Silberg (director); Charles Parker, Allen DeBevoise (screenplay); Lucinda Dickey, Adolfo 'Shabba Doo' Quiñones, Michael 'Boogaloo Shrimp' Chambers, Ice-T, Scratcher, Ben Lokey, Phineas Newborn III, Christopher McDonald, Vidal "Lil Coco" Rodriguez, Bruno "Pop N' Taco" Falcon, Timothy "Popin' Pete" Solomon, Ana "Lollipop" Sanchez, Cooley Jaxson, Peter Bromilow, Michel Qissi, Jean-Claude van Damme	
M A Y	4	Sixteen Candles	Universal Pictures / Channel Productions	John Hughes (director/screenplay); Molly Ringwald, Michael Schoeffling, Paul Dooley, Justin Henry, Anthony Michael Hall, Carlin Glynn, Haviland Morris, Blanche Baker, Gedde Watanabe, Edward Andrews, Billie Bird, Carole Cook, Max Showalter, Liane Curtis, John Cusack, Joan Cusack, Brian Doyle-Murray, Jami Gertz, John Kapelos, Zelda Rubinstein, Darren Harris, Deborah Pollack	
M A Y	6	V The Final Battle	NBC / Warner Bros. Television / Blatt-Singer Productions	Richard T. Heffron (director); Brian Taggart, Peggy Goldman, Diane Frolov, Faustus Buck (teleplay/story); Lillian Weezer, Harry & Renee Longstreet (story); Marc Singer, Faye Grant, Jane Badler, Andrew Prine, Richard Herd, Michael Durrell, Michael Ironside, David Packer, Peter Nelson, Blair Tefkin, Robert Englund, Michael Wright, Sandy Simpson, Denise Galik, Thomas Hill, Mickey Jones, Viveka Davis, Neva Patterson, Jason Bernard, Hansford Rowe, Jenny Sullivan, Diane Civita, Eric Johnston, Jenny Beck, Sarah Douglas, Frank Ashmore, Greta Blackburn, Stack Pierce	
M A Y	11	Firestarter	Universal Pictures / Dino De Laurentiis Company	Mark L. Lester (director); Stanley Mann (screenplay); David Keith, Drew Barrymore, Freddie Jones, Heather Locklear, Martin Sheen, George C. Scott, Art Carney, Louise Fletcher, Moses Gunn, Antonio Vargas	
M A Y	11	The Natural	Tri-Star Pictures	Barry Levinson (director); Roger Towne, Phil Dusenberry (screenplay); Robert Redford, Robert Duvall, Glenn Close, Kim Basinger, Wilford Brimley, Barbara Hershey, Robert Prosky, Richard Farnsworth, Joe Don Baker, Darren McGavin, Michael Madsen, John Finnegan, Alan Fudge, Mike Starr, Anthony J. Ferrara, Sibby Sisti, Ken Grassano, Mickey Treanor, Jon Van Ness, George Wilkosz, Paul Sullivan Jr., Robert Rich III, Rachel Hall	
M A Y	18	Finders Keepers	Warner Bros. / CBS Theatrical Films	Richard Lester (director); Charles Dennis, Ronny Graham, Terence Marsh (screenplay); Michael O'Keefe, Beverly D'Angelo, David Wayne, Ed Lauter, Brian Dennehy, Pamela Stephenson, Louis Gossett Jr., Jack Riley, John Schuck, Timothy Blake, Jim Carrey, Robert Clothier, Jayne Eastwood, Alf Humphreys, Richard Newman, Campbell Lane	
M A Y	18	Making the Grade	MGM/UA / Cannon Film Distributors	Dorian Walker (director); Charles Gayle, Gene Quintano (screenplay); Judd Nelson, Jonna Lee, Gordon Jump, Walter Olkewicz, Ronald Lacey, Dana Olsen, John Dye, Carey Scott, Scott McGinnis, Andrew Dice Clay, Dan Schneider	
M A Y	23	Indiana Jones and the Temple of Doom	Paramount Pictures / Lucasfilm Ltd.	Steven Spielberg (director); Willard Huyck, Gloria Katz (screenplay); Harrison Ford, Kate Capshaw, Amrish Puri, Roshan Seth, Philip Stone, Ke Huy Quan, Roy Chiao, David Yip, D.R. Nanayakkara, Pat Roach, Steven Spielberg, George Lucas, Frank Marshall, Kathleen Kennedy, Dan Aykroyd, Ron Taylor, Katie Leigh, Tress MacNeille, Frank Oz	
J U N E	1	Once Upon a Time in America	Warner Bros. / The Ladd Company / Embassy International Pictures / PSO Enterprises / Rafran Cinematografica	Sergio Leone (director/screenplay); Leonardo Benvenuti, Piero De Bernardi, Enrico Medioli, Franco Arcalli, Franco Ferrini (screenplay); Robert De Niro, James Woods, Elizabeth McGovern, Joe Pesci, Burt Young, Tuesday Weld, Treat Williams, Danny Aiello, William Forsythe, Richard Bright, James Hayden, Darlanne Fluegel, Robert Harper, Noah Moazezi, James Russo, Marcia Jean Kurtz, Estelle Harris, Joey Faye, Olga Karlatos, Mario Brega, Chuck Low, Rusty Jacobs, Jennifer Connelly, Brian Bloom, Julie Cohen, Arnon Milchan, Scott Tiler, Adrian Curran, Larry Rapp, Mike Monetti, Richard Foronji, Dutch Miller, Gerard Murphy, Amy Ryder, Frank Gio, Ray Dittrich, Francesca Leone	
J U N E	1	Star Trek III: The Search for Spock	Paramount Pictures	Leonard Nimoy (director); Harve Bennett (screenplay); William Shatner, Leonard Nimoy, DeForest Kelley, James Doohan, George Takei, Walter Koenig, Nichelle Nichols, Merritt Butrick, Robin Curtis, Christopher Lloyd, Mark Lenard, Robert Hooks, James B. Sikking, Miguel Ferrer, Phillip R. Allen, John Larroquette, Catherine Shirriff, Grace Lee Whitney, Scott McGinnis, Dame Judith Anderson, Carl Steven, Vadia Potenza, Stephen Manley, Joe W. Davis, Frank Welker	
J U N E	1	Streets of Fire	Universal Pictures / RKO Pictures / A Hill-Gordon-Silver Production	Walter Hill (director/screenplay); Larry Gross (screenplay); Michael Paré, Diane Lane, Rick Moranis, Amy Madigan, Willem Dafoe, Deborah Van Valkenburgh, Richard Lawson, Rick Rossovich, Bill Paxton, Lee Ving, Stoney Jackson, Grand Bush, Robert Townsend, Mykelti Williamson, E.G. Daily, Ed Begley Jr., John Dennis Johnston	
J U N E	8	Beat Street	Orion Pictures	Stan Lathan (director); Andrew Davis, David Gilbert, Paul Golding, Steven Hager (screenplay); Rae Dawn Chong, Guy Davis, Jon Chardiet, Leon W. Grant, Saundra Santiago, Robert Taylor, Lee Chamberlin, Mary Alice, Shawn Elliott, Jim Borrelli, Dean Elliott, Franc. Reyes, Tonya Pinkins, Duane Jones, Afrika Bambaataa, Soulsonic Force, Jazzy Jay, Doug E. Fresh, Bernard Fowler, New York City Breakers, Rock Steady Crew, Crazy Legs, Prince Ken Swift, Clive "Kool Herc" Campbell, Treacherous Three, Grandmaster Melle Mel & the Furious Five, Wanda Dee, Brenda K. Starr, The System, Kuriaki, Devious Doze, Buck Four, Baby Love	
J U N E	8	Ghostbusters	Columbia Pictures / Delphi Films / Black Rhino Productions	Ivan Reitman (director); Dan Aykroyd, Harold Ramis (screenplay); Bill Murray, Dan Aykroyd, Sigourney Weaver, Harold Ramis, Rick Moranis, Ernie Hudson, Annie Potts, William Atherton, David Margulies, Michael Ensign, Slavitza Jovan, Paddi Edwards, Ruth Hale Oliver, Alice Drummond, Jennifer Runyon, Steven Tash, Kymberly Herrin, Timothy Carhart, Reginald VelJohnson, Roger Grimsby, Larry King, Joe Franklin, Casey Kasem, Jean Kasem, Ron Jeremy	
J U N E	8	Gremlins	Warner Bros. / Amblin Entertainment	Joe Dante (director); Chris Columbus (screenplay); Zach Galligan, Phoebe Cates, Hoyt Axton, Polly Holliday, Frances Lee McCain, Judge Reinhold, Dick Miller, Glynn Turman, Keye Luke, Scott Brady, Corey Feldman, Jonathan Banks, Edward Andrews, Jackie Joseph, Belinda Balaski, Harry Carey Jr., Nick Katt, Tracy Wells, John C. Becher, Joe Brooks, Howie Mandel, Frank Welker, Don Steele, Marvin Miller, Michael Winslow, Bob Bergen, Fred Newman, Peter Cullen, Bob Holt, Steven Spielberg, Jim McKrell, Tom Bergeron, Jerry Goldsmith, William Schallert, Chuck Jones, Kenneth Tobey, Richard Carlson, Kenny Davis, Gwen Willson, Arnie Moore, Mark Dodson, Michael Sheehan, Brad Kesten	
J U N E	8	Top Secret!	Paramount Pictures	Jim Abrahams, David Zucker, Jerry Zucker (directors/screenplay); Martyn Burke (screenplay); Val Kilmer, Lucy Gutteridge, Christopher Villiers, Billy J. Mitchell, Jeremy Kemp, Omar Sharif, Peter Cushing, Michael Gough, Warren Clarke, Harry Ditson, Jim Carter, Eddie Tagoe, John Sharp, Ian McNeice, Gertan Klauber, Richard Mayes, Vyvyan Lorrayne, Max Faulkner, Tristram Jellinek, John J. Carney, Dimitri Andreas, Doug Robinson	
J U N E	15	Careful, He Might Hear You	20th Century Fox	Carl Schultz (director); Michael Jenkins (screenplay); Wendy Hughes, Robyn Nevin, Nicholas Gledhill, John Hargreaves, Geraldine Turner, Isabelle Anderson, Peter Whitford, Colleen Clifford, Edward Howell, Jacqueline Kott, Julie Nihill, Michael Long, Norman Kaye	
J U N E	15	Under the Volcano	Universal Pictures	John Huston (director); Guy Gallo (screenplay); Albert Finney, Jacqueline Bisset, Anthony Andrews, Ignacio López Tarso, Katy Jurado, James Villiers, Dawson Bray, Carlos Riquelme, Emilio Fernández, Jim McCarthy, Hugo Stiglitz, Günter Meisner	
J U N E	21	After the Rehearsal	Triumph Films	Ingmar Bergman (director/screenplay); Erland Josephson, Ingrid Thulin, Lena Olin, Nadja Palmstjerna-Weiss, Bertil Guve	
J U N E	22	The Karate Kid	Columbia Pictures / Delphi II Productions / Jerry Weintraub Productions	John G. Avildsen (director); Robert Mark Kamen (screenplay); Ralph Macchio, Noriyuki "Pat" Morita, Elisabeth Shue, Martin Kove, William Zabka, Randee Heller, Chad McQueen, Ron Thomas, Rob Garrison, Tony O'Dell, Israel Juarbe, William Bassett, Larry B. Scott, Pat E. Johnson, Bruce Malmuth, Frances Bay, Larry Drake, Peter Jason, Sam Scarber, Andrew Shue, Shannon Wilcox	
J U N E	22	The Pope of Greenwich Village	Metro-Goldwyn-Mayer	Stuart Rosenberg (director); Vincent Patrick (screenplay); Eric Roberts, Mickey Rourke, Daryl Hannah, Geraldine Page, Kenneth McMillan, Tony Musante, M. Emmet Walsh, Burt Young, Jack Kehoe, Philip Bosco, Val Avery, Joe Grifasi, Tony DiBenedetto, Ronald Maccone, Betty Miller, Tony Lip, Frank Vincent, Jacques Sandulescu, Leonard Termo	
J U N E	22	Rhinestone	20th Century Fox	Bob Clark (director); Phil Alden Robinson, Sylvester Stallone (screenplay); Sylvester Stallone, Dolly Parton, Richard Farnsworth, Ron Leibman, Tim Thomerson, Russell Buchanan, Ritch Brinkley, Jesse Welles, Speck Rhodes, Steve Peck, Penny Santon, Jerry Potter, Phil Rubenstein, Tony Munafo, Don Hanmer, Guy Fitch, Cindy Perlman	
J U N E	29	Bachelor Party	20th Century Fox	Neal Israel (director/screenplay); Pat Proft (screenplay); Tom Hanks, Tawny Kitaen, Adrian Zmed, George Grizzard, Barbara Stuart, Robert Prescott, William Tepper, Wendie Jo Sperber, Barry Diamond, Tracy Smith, Gary Grossman, Michael Dudikoff, Gerard Prendergast, Deborah Harmon, Kenneth Kimmins, Rosanne Katon, Christopher Morley, Brett Baxter Clark, Monique Gabrielle, Angela Aames, Hugh McPhillips, Billy Beck, Milt Kogan, Pat Proft, Tad Horino, Toni Alessandrini, Bradford Bancroft	
J U N E	29	Cannonball Run II	Warner Bros. / Golden Harvest	Hal Needham (director/screenplay); Harvey Miller (screenplay); Burt Reynolds, Dom DeLuise, Dean Martin, Sammy Davis Jr., Jamie Farr, Marilu Henner, Telly Savalas, Shirley MacLaine, Susan Anton, Catherine Bach, Jackie Chan, Richard Kiel, Frank Sinatra, Ricardo Montalbán, Foster Brooks, Sid Caesar, Louis Nye, Tim Conway, Don Knotts, Mel Tillis, Tony Danza, Jack Elam, Charles Nelson Reilly, Michael V. Gazzo, Alex Rocco, Henry Silva, Abe Vigoda, Jim Nabors, Molly Picon, Joe Theismann, Shawn Weatherly, Dale Ishimoto, Arte Johnson, Fred Dryer, Chris Lemmon, George Lindsey, Doug McClure, Jilly Rizzo, Dub Taylor, Hal Needham, Albert Ruddy	
J U N E	29	Conan the Destroyer	Universal Pictures / Dino De Laurentiis Company	Richard Fleischer (director); Stanley Mann (screenplay); Arnold Schwarzenegger, Grace Jones, Wilt Chamberlain, Mako, Tracey Walter, Olivia d'Abo, Sarah Douglas, Pat Roach, Jeff Corey, Sven-Ole Thorsen, André the Giant, Ferdy Mayne, Bruce Fleischer, Pablo Talamante	

== July–September ==
Opening		Title	Production company	Cast and crew	Ref.
J U L Y	13	The Last Starfighter	Universal Pictures / Lorimar Productions	Nick Castle (director); Jonathan R. Betuel (screenplay); Lance Guest, Dan O'Herlihy, Robert Preston, Catherine Mary Stewart, Norman Snow, Kay E. Kuter, Barbara Bosson, Chris Hebert, Dan Mason, Vernon Washington, Peter Nelson, Peggy Pope, Meg Wyllie, Britt Leach, Owen Bush, Marc Alaimo, Wil Wheaton, Cameron Dye, Geoffrey Blake, John O'Leary, George McDaniel, Charlene Nelson, John Maio, Al Berry, Scott Dunlop, Ellen Blake, Bunny Summers	
J U L Y	13	The Muppets Take Manhattan	Tri-Star Pictures / The Jim Henson Company	Frank Oz (director/screenplay); Tom Patchett, Jay Tarses (screenplay); Jim Henson, Frank Oz, Jerry Nelson, Richard Hunt, Dave Goelz, Steve Whitmire, Bruce Edward Hall, Kathryn Mullen, Karen Prell, Brian Muehl, Louis Zorich, Juliana Donald, Lonny Price, Cheryl McFadden, Graham Brown, Frances Bergen, Art Carney, James Coco, Dabney Coleman, Elliott Gould, Gregory Hines, Edward I. Koch, John Landis, Linda Lavin, Liza Minnelli, Joan Rivers, Brooke Shields, David Lazer, Vincent Sardi, Jr.	
J U L Y	20	Best Defense	Paramount Pictures / Cinema Group Ventures / Eddie Murphy Productions	Willard Huyck (director/screenplay); Gloria Katz (screenplay); Dudley Moore, Eddie Murphy, Kate Capshaw, George Dzundza, Helen Shaver, Mark Arnott, Peter Michael Goetz, Tom Noonan, David Rasche, Paul Comi, John Hostetter	
J U L Y	20	Electric Dreams	MGM/UA / Virgin Films	Steve Barron (director); Rusty Lemorande (screenplay); Lenny Von Dohlen, Virginia Madsen, Maxwell Caulfield, Bud Cort, Don Fellows, Miriam Margolyes, Giorgio Moroder, Koo Stark	
J U L Y	20	The NeverEnding Story	Warner Bros. / Producers Sales Organization	Wolfgang Petersen (director/screenplay); Herman Weigel (screenplay); Barret Oliver, Noah Hathaway, Tami Stronach, Patricia Hayes, Sydney Bromley, Gerald McRaney, Moses Gunn, Alan Oppenheimer, Thomas Hill, Deep Roy, Tilo Prückner, Darryl Cooksey, Drum Garrett, Nicholas Gilbert	
J U L Y	20	Revenge of the Nerds	20th Century Fox / Interscope Communications	Jeff Kanew (director); Steve Zacharias, Jeff Buhai (screenplay); Robert Carradine, Anthony Edwards, Timothy Busfield, Andrew Cassese, Curtis Armstrong, Larry B. Scott, Brian Tochi, Julie Montgomery, Michelle Meyrink, Ted McGinley, Matt Salinger, Donald Gibb, James Cromwell, Lisa Welch, David Wohl, John Goodman, Bernie Casey, Alice Hirson	
J U L Y	27	The Jungle Book (re-release)	Walt Disney Productions	Wolfgang Reitherman (director); Larry Clemmons, Ralph Wright, Ken Anderson, Vance Gerry, Floyd Norman, Bill Peet (screenplay); Bruce Reitherman, Phil Harris, Sebastian Cabot, Louis Prima, George Sanders, Sterling Holloway, J. Pat O'Malley, Verna Felton, Clint Howard, Chad Stuart, Lord Tim Hudson, John Abbott, Ben Wright, Darleen Carr, Leo De Lyon, Hal Smith, Ralph Wright, Digby Wolfe, Bill Skiles, Pete Henderson	
J U L Y	27	Meatballs Part II	Tri-Star Pictures	Ken Wiederhorn (director); Bruce Franklin Singer (screenplay); Richard Mulligan, Hamilton Camp, John Mengatti, Kim Richards, Archie Hahn, Misty Rowe, John Larroquette, Paul Reubens, Joe Nipote, Jason Hervey, Elayne Boosler, Nancy Glass, Felix Silla, Joaquin Martinez, Donald Gibb, Blackie Dammett, Jason Luque	
J U L Y	27	Purple Rain	Warner Bros. / Purple Films	Albert Magnoli (director/screenplay); William Blinn (screenplay); Prince, Apollonia Kotero, Morris Day, Olga Karlatos, Clarence Williams III, Jerome Benton, Billy Sparks, Jill Jones, Dez Dickerson, Wendy Melvoin, Lisa Coleman, The Revolution, The Time, Apollonia 6	
A U G U S T	2	The Bostonians	Almi Pictures	James Ivory (director); Ruth Prawer Jhabvala (screenplay); Christopher Reeve, Vanessa Redgrave, Jessica Tandy, Madeleine Potter, Nancy Marchand, Wesley Addy, Barbara Bryne, Linda Hunt, Charles McCaughan, Nancy New, John Van Ness Philip, Wallace Shawn	
A U G U S T	3	Grandview, U.S.A.	Warner Bros. / CBS Theatrical Films	Randal Kleiser (director); Ken Hixon (screenplay); Jamie Lee Curtis, Patrick Swayze, C. Thomas Howell, Jennifer Jason Leigh, Carole Cook, John Philbin, Ramon Bieri, Elizabeth Gorcey, M. Emmet Walsh, Kathryn Joosten, Troy Donahue, William Windom, Michael Winslow, John Cusack, Joan Cusack, Larry Brandenburg, Steve Dahl, Fern Persons, Camilla Hawke, Melissa Domke, Bruno Alexander, Fred Lerner, Tim Gamble, Milford Watson	
A U G U S T	3	Joy of Sex	Paramount Pictures	Martha Coolidge (director); Kathleen Rowell, J.J. Salter (screenplay); Cameron Dye, Michelle Meyrink, Colleen Camp, Ernie Hudson, Lisa Langlois, Darren Dalton, Christopher Lloyd	
A U G U S T	3	The Philadelphia Experiment	New World Pictures / Cinema Group	Stewart Raffill (director); Wallace C. Bennett (screenplay); Michael Paré, Nancy Allen, Eric Christmas, Bobby Di Cicco, Louise Latham, Stephen Tobolowsky, Ralph Manza, Kene Holliday, Joe Dorsey, Michael Currie, Gary Brockette, Glenn Morshower, Vaughn Armstrong, Debra Troyer, Miles McNamara, James Edgcomb	
A U G U S T	10	Cloak & Dagger	Universal Pictures	Richard Franklin (director); Tom Holland (screenplay); Henry Thomas, Dabney Coleman, Michael Murphy, Christina Nigra, Jeanette Nolan, John McIntire, Eloy Casados, Tim Rossovich, William Forsythe, Robert DoQui, Shelby Leverington	
A U G U S T	10	Metropolis (re-release)	Parufamet	Fritz Lang (director); Thea von Harbou (screenplay); Alfred Abel, Brigitte Helm, Gustav Fröhlich, Rudolf Klein-Rogge, Fritz Rasp, Theodor Loos, Erwin Biswanger, Heinrich George, Heinrich Gotho	
A U G U S T	10	Red Dawn	MGM/UA	John Milius (director/screenplay); Kevin Reynolds (screenplay); Patrick Swayze, C. Thomas Howell, Lea Thompson, Charlie Sheen, Darren Dalton, Jennifer Grey, Brad Savage, Doug Toby, Powers Boothe, Ben Johnson, Harry Dean Stanton, Ron O'Neal, William Smith, Vladek Sheybal, Frank McRae, Roy Jenson, Pepe Serna, Lane Smith, Radames Pera, Lois Kimbrell, Judd Omen	
A U G U S T	13	Nemo	The Cannon Group, Inc. / Goldcrest Films	Arnaud Sélignac(director/screenplay); Jean-Pierre Esquenazi, Telsche Boorman (screenplay); Seth Kibel, Jason Connery, Mathilda May, Harvey Keitel, Nipsey Russell, Carole Bouquet, Michel Blanc, Katrine Boorman, Dominique Pinon, Charley Boorman	
A U G U S T	15	The Adventures of Buckaroo Banzai Across the 8th Dimension	20th Century Fox / Sherwood Productions	W. D. Richter (director); Earl Mac Rauch (screenplay); Peter Weller, John Lithgow, Ellen Barkin, Jeff Goldblum, Christopher Lloyd, Lewis Smith, Rosalind Cash, Robert Ito, Pepe Serna, Michael Santano, Ronald Lacey, Matt Clark, Clancy Brown, William Traylor, Carl Lumbly, Vincent Schiavelli, Dan Hedaya, Mariclare Costello, Bill Henderson, Damon Hines, Billy Vera, Laura Harrington, Yakov Smirnoff	
A U G U S T	15	Dreamscape	20th Century Fox / Zupnik-Curtis Enterprises	Joseph Ruben (director/screenplay); David Loughery, Chuck Russell (screenplay); Dennis Quaid, Max von Sydow, Christopher Plummer, Eddie Albert, Kate Capshaw, David Patrick Kelly, George Wendt, Chris Mulkey, Larry Gelman, Cory "Bumper" Yothers, Redmond Gleeson, Eric Gold, Peter Jason, Jana Taylor	
A U G U S T	15	The Woman in Red	Orion Pictures	Gene Wilder (director/screenplay); Gene Wilder, Kelly LeBrock, Gilda Radner, Charles Grodin, Joseph Bologna, Judith Ivey, Michael Zorek, Robin Ignico, Michael Huddleston, Arthur Bailey, Kyra Stempel, Viola Kates Stimpson	
A U G U S T	17	Sheena	Columbia Pictures	John Guillermin (director); Lorenzo Semple Jr., Leslie Stevens (screenplay); Tanya Roberts, Ted Wass, Donovan Scott, Princess Elizabeth, France Zobda, Trevor Thomas, Clifton Jones, John Forgeham, Errol John, Sylvester Williams, Bob Sherman, Nick Brimble, Paul Gee, Dave Cooper, Oliver Litondo, Joseph Olita, Kirsty Lindsay, Kathryn Gant, Michael Shannon, Nancy Paul	
A U G U S T	17	Tightrope	Warner Bros. / The Malpaso Company	Richard Tuggle (director/screenplay); Clint Eastwood, Geneviève Bujold, Dan Hedaya, Alison Eastwood, Jenny Beck, Marco St. John, Rod Masterson, Jamie Rose, Janet MacLachlan	
A U G U S T	19	Cat on a Hot Tin Roof	Showtime Entertainment / American Playhouse / International Television Group / KCET	Jack Hofsiss (director); Tennessee Williams (screenplay); Jessica Lange, Tommy Lee Jones, Rip Torn, Kim Stanley, David Dukes, Penny Fuller, Macon McCalman, Thomas Hill, Fran Bennett, Ami Foster, Jake Jundef, Neta Lee-Noy	
A U G U S T	24	Love Streams	Cannon Films	John Cassavetes (director/screenplay); Ted Allan (screenplay); Gena Rowlands, John Cassavetes, Diahnne Abbott, Seymour Cassel, Margaret Abbott, Jakob Shaw, Eddy Donno, Joan Foley, Al Ruban, Tom Badel, Doe Avedon, Leslie Hope	
A U G U S T	24	Old Enough	Orion Classics / Silver Films	Marisa Silver (director/screenplay); Sarah Boyd, Rainbow Harvest, Neill Barry, Danny Aiello, Alyssa Milano, Roxanne Hart, Susan Kingsley, Fran Brill, Gerry Bamman, Anne Pitoniak, Tristine Skyler, Charlie Willenger, Michael Monetti, Manny Jacobs, Gina Battist, Paul Butler	
A U G U S T	24	Oxford Blues	MGM/UA / 20th Century Fox	Robert Boris (director/screenplay); Rob Lowe, Amanda Pays, Julian Sands, Ally Sheedy, Julian Firth, Alan Howard, Gail Strickland, Michael Gough, Aubrey Morris, Anthony Calf, Cary Elwes, Bruce Payne, Richard Hunt	
A U G U S T	29	Choose Me	Island Alive	Alan Rudolph (director/screenplay); Geneviève Bujold, Keith Carradine, Lesley Ann Warren, Patrick Bauchau, Rae Dawn Chong, John Larroquette, Edward Ruscha, Gailard Sartain	
A U G U S T	31	Bolero	City Films / Cannon Film Distributors	John Derek (director/screenplay); Bo Derek, George Kennedy, Andrea Occhipinti, Ana Obregón, Olivia d'Abo, Greg Bensen, Ian Cochrane, Mirta Miller, Mickey Knox, Paul Stacey, James Stacy	
A U G U S T	31	C.H.U.D.	New World Pictures	Douglas Cheek (director); Parnell Hall (screenplay); John Heard, Daniel Stern, Christopher Curry, Kim Greist, J. C. Quinn, Michael O'Hare, Peter Michael Goetz, Sam McMurray, Frankie R. Faison, John Goodman, Jay Thomas, Hallie Foote, Graham Beckel, Jon Polito, George Martn	
A U G U S T	31	Flashpoint	Tri-Star Pictures / HBO Pictures / Silver Screen Partners	William Tannen (director); Dennis Shryack, Michael Butler (screenplay); Kris Kristofferson, Treat Williams, Rip Torn, Tess Harper, Kurtwood Smith, Jean Smart, Kevin Conway, Miguel Ferrer, Guy Boyd, Roberts Blossom, Mark Slade, Terry Alexander, William Frankfather, Joaquín Martínez, Dick O'Neill	
S E P T E M B E R	7	The Brother from Another Planet	Cinecom Pictures	John Sayles (director/screenplay); Joe Morton, Sidney "Piankhy" Sheriff Jr., Rosanna Carter, Ray Ramirez, Yves Rene, Peter Richardson, Ginny Yang, Daryl Edwards, Steve James, Leonard Jackson, Carolyn Aaron, Bill Cobbs, Maggie Renzi, Olga Merediz, Tom Wright, Minnie Gentry, Ren Woods, Fisher Stevens, Dee Dee Bridgewater, David Strathairn, John Sayles, Ishmael Houston-Jones, Bert Simms	
S E P T E M B E R	14	Secret Honor	Cinecom Pictures	Robert Altman (director); Donald Freed, Arnold M. Stone (screenplay); Philip Baker Hall	
S E P T E M B E R	14	A Soldier's Story	Columbia Pictures	Norman Jewison (director); Charles Fuller (screenplay); Howard E. Rollins Jr., Adolph Caesar, Art Evans, David Alan Grier, David Harris, Dennis Lipscomb, Larry Riley, Robert Townsend, Denzel Washington, William Allen Young, John Hancock, Patti LaBelle, Trey Wilson, Wings Hauser	
S E P T E M B E R	19	Amadeus	Orion Pictures / The Saul Zaentz Company	Miloš Forman (director); Peter Shaffer (screenplay); F. Murray Abraham, Tom Hulce, Elizabeth Berridge, Simon Callow, Roy Dotrice, Christine Ebersole, Jeffrey Jones, Charles Kay, Kenny Baker, Barbara Bryne, Roderick Cook, Richard Frank, Patrick Hines, Cynthia Nixon, Brian Pettifer, Vincent Schiavelli, Douglas Seale, Miroslav Sekera, John Strauss, Lisabeth Bartlett, Martin Cavani, Milan Demjanenko, Peter DiGesu, Nicholas Kepros, Philip Lenkowsky, Herman Meckler, Jonathan Moore, Karl-Heinz Teuber	
S E P T E M B E R	20	Carmen	Gaumont	Francesco Rosi (director/screenplay); Henri Meilhac, Ludovic Halévy, Tonino Guerra (screenplay); Julia Migenes-Johnson, Plácido Domingo, Ruggero Raimondi, Faith Esham, François le Roux, Jean-Philippe Lafont, Julien Guiomar, Cristina Hoyos, Juan Antonio Jiménez, John-Paul Bogart, Susan Daniel, Lillian Watson, Gérard Garino, Accursio Di Leo, Maria Campano	
S E P T E M B E R	21	All of Me	Universal Pictures / Thorn EMI Screen Entertainment / Kings Road Entertainment	Carl Reiner (director); Phil Alden Robinson, Henry Olek (screenplay); Steve Martin, Lily Tomlin, Victoria Tennant, Madolyn Smith, Richard Libertini, Dana Elcar, Jason Bernard, Selma Diamond, Eric Christmas, Gailard Sartain, Neva Patterson, Michael Ensign, Peggy Feury, Nan Martin, Basil Hoffman, Hedley Mattingly, Harvey Vernon	
S E P T E M B E R	21	Places in the Heart	Tri-Star Pictures	Robert Benton (director/screenplay); Sally Field, Lindsay Crouse, Danny Glover, John Malkovich, Ed Harris, Ray Baker, Amy Madigan, Yankton Hatten, Gennie James, Lane Smith, Terry O'Quinn, Bert Remsen, Jay Patterson, Toni Hudson, De'voreaux White, Jerry Haynes	
S E P T E M B E R	21	Windy City	Warner Bros. / CBS Theatrical Films	Armyan Bernstein (director/screenplay); John Shea, Kate Capshaw, Josh Mostel, Jim Borrelli, Jeffrey DeMunn, Eric Pierpoint, Lewis J. Stadlen, James Sutorius, Niles McMaster, Lisa Taylor, Nathan Davis, Louie Lanciloti, Wilbert Bradley	
S E P T E M B E R	21	Until September	MGM/UA	Richard Marquand (director); Janice Lee Graham (screenplay); Karen Allen, Thierry Lhermitte, Christopher Cazenove, Hutton Cobb, Michael Mellinger, Nitza Shaul, Rachel Robertson, Raphaelle Spencer, Joanna Pavlis, Helen Desbiez, Steve Gadler	
S E P T E M B E R	28	Body Rock	New World Pictures	Marcelo Epstein (director); Desmond Nakano, Kimberly Lynn White (screenplay); Lorenzo Lamas, Vicki Frederick, Cameron Dye, Michelle Nicastro, Ray Sharkey, Seth Kaufman, René Elizondo	
S E P T E M B E R	28	Country	Touchstone Films / Far West Productions / Pangaea Corporation	Richard Pearce (director); William D. Wittliff (screenplay); Jessica Lange, Sam Shepard, Wilford Brimley, Matt Clark, Therese Graham, Levi L. Knebel, Jim Haynie, Sandra Seacat, Alex Harvey, Stephanie Stacie-Poyner	
S E P T E M B E R	28	Heartbreakers	Orion Pictures / Jethro Films Production	Bobby Roth (director/screenplay); Peter Coyote, Nick Mancuso, Carole Laure, Max Gail, James Laurenson, Carol Wayne, Jamie Rose, Kathryn Harrold, George Morfogen, Jerry Hardin, Henry G. Sanders, Walter Olkewicz	
S E P T E M B E R	28	Irreconcilable Differences	Warner Bros.	Charles Shyer (director/screenplay); Nancy Meyers (screenplay); Ryan O'Neal, Shelley Long, Drew Barrymore, Sam Wanamaker, Allen Garfield, Sharon Stone, David Paymer, Lorinne Vozoff, David Graf, Ida Random, Jenny Gago, Kelly Lange, Rex Reed, William A. Fraker, Eloise Hardt, Stuart Pankin, Luana Anders, Charlotte Stewart, Ken Lerner, Ellen Geer, Beverly Reed, Hortensia Colorado, Johna Stewart-Bowden, Richard Minchenberg	
S E P T E M B E R	28	The River Rat	Paramount Pictures	Thomas Rickman (director/screenplay); Martha Plimpton, Tommy Lee Jones, Brian Dennehy, Tony Frank, Melissa Hart, Peter Renaday, Shawn Smith, Norman Bennett, Nancy Lea Owen, Angie Bolling	
S E P T E M B E R	28	The Wild Life	Universal Pictures	Art Linson (director); Cameron Crowe (screenplay); Christopher Penn, Lea Thompson, Ilan Mitchell-Smith, Jenny Wright, Eric Stoltz, Rick Moranis, Hart Bochner, Randy Quaid, Robert Ridgely, Jack Kehoe, Simone White, Michael Bowen, Ángel Salazar, Dick Rude, Sherilyn Fenn, Leo Penn, Lee Ving, Dean Devlin, Nancy Wilson, Ben Stein, Keone Young, Kevin Peter Hall, Kitten Natividad, Cameron Crowe, Ronnie Wood, Tommy Swerdlow, Tony Epper, Ted White, Gary Riley, Brin Berliner, Susan Blackstone, Cari Anne Warder, Beth McKinley, Reginald Farmer, Hildy Brooks, Robert Chestnut, Ashley St. John, Danny Tucker	

== October–December ==
Opening		Title	Production company	Cast and crew	Ref.
O C T O B E R	1	Stranger Than Paradise	The Samuel Goldwyn Company / Cinesthesia Productions Inc.	Jim Jarmusch (director/screenplay); John Lurie, Eszter Balint, Richard Edson, Rammellzee, Tom DiCillo, Rockets Redglare, Sara Driver, Cecillia Stark, Danny Rosen, Richard Boes, Harvey Perr, Brian J. Burchill, Paul Sloane	
O C T O B E R	5	Eureka	MGM/UA / Recorded Picture Company / JF Productions / Sunley Productions	Nicolas Roeg (director); Paul Mayersberg (screenplay); Gene Hackman, Rutger Hauer, Theresa Russell, Mickey Rourke, Joe Pesci, Jane Lapotaire, Ed Lauter, Joe Spinell, James Faulkner, Corin Redgrave, Helena Kallianiotes, Cavan Kendall, Norman Beaton, Emrys James, Emma Relph, Timothy Scott, Ian Tracey	
O C T O B E R	5	Teachers	MGM/UA / Aaron Russo Productions	Arthur Hiller (director); W. R. McKinney (screenplay); Nick Nolte, JoBeth Williams, Judd Hirsch, Ralph Macchio, Allen Garfield, Lee Grant, Richard Mulligan, Laura Dern, Crispin Glover, Morgan Freeman, Royal Dano, William Schallert, Art Metrano, Madeleine Sherwood, Steven Hill, Zohra Lampert, Mary Alice, Terry Ellis, Ronald Hunter, Virginia Capers, Ellen Crawford, Vivian Bonnell, Anthony Heald, Katharine Balfour, Jeff Ware, Richard Zobel, George Dzundza	
O C T O B E R	8	The Burning Bed	NBC Productions / Tisch/Avnet Productions Inc.	Robert Greenwald (director); Rose Leiman Goldemberg (screenplay); Farrah Fawcett, Paul Le Mat, Richard Masur, Grace Zabriskie, Penelope Milford, Christa Denton, James T. Callahan, Gary Grubbs, David Friedman, David Andrews, James Hampton, Virgil Frye, Dixie K. Wade, Heather Rich, Justin Gocke, Elizabeth Lyn Fraser, Jeremy Ross	
O C T O B E R	10	Comfort and Joy	Universal Pictures / Thorn EMI / Lake Ltd. / Scottish Television / Kings Road Entertainment	Bill Forsyth (director/screenplay); Bill Paterson, Eleanor David, Clare Grogan, Alex Norton, Patrick Malahide, Rikki Fulton, Roberto Bernardi, George Rossi, Ron Donachie, Iain McColl, Arnold Brown, Peter Rossi, Billy McElhaney, Gilly Gilchrist, Caroline Guthrie, Ona McCracken, Elizabeth Sinclair, Katy Black, Robin Black, Billy Johnstone	
O C T O B E R	12	Garbo Talks	MGM/UA	Sidney Lumet (director); Larry Grusin (screenplay); Anne Bancroft, Ron Silver, Carrie Fisher, Catherine Hicks, Steven Hill, Howard Da Silva, Dorothy Loudon, Harvey Fierstein, Hermione Gingold, Alice Spivak, Mary McDonnell, Adolph Green, Andrzej Bartkowiak, Cy Coleman, Betty Comden, Greta Garbo, George Plimpton	
O C T O B E R	12	Songwriter	Tri-Star Pictures	Alan Rudolph (director); Bud Shrake (screenplay); Willie Nelson, Kris Kristofferson, Lesley Ann Warren, Rip Torn, Melinda Dillon, Mickey Raphael, Richard C. Sarafian, Shannon Wilcox, Jeff MacKay, Gailard Sartain, Joe Keyes, Booker T. Jones, Mickey Rooney Jr., Rhonda Dotson, Robert Gould, Sage Parker	
O C T O B E R	19	Crimes of Passion	New World Pictures	Ken Russell (director); Barry Sandler (screenplay); Kathleen Turner, Anthony Perkins, John Laughlin, Annie Potts, Bruce Davison, Yvonne McCord, Stephen Lee, Louise Sorel, Rick Wakeman	
O C T O B E R	19	The Little Drummer Girl	Warner Bros.	George Roy Hill (director); John le Carré, Loring Mandel (screenplay); Diane Keaton, Yorgo Voyagis, Klaus Kinski, Sami Frey, Michael Cristofer, Eli Danker, Ben Levine, Jonathan Sagall, Shlomit Hagoel, Juliano Mer, Sabi Dorr, Doron Nesher, Smadar Brener, Shoshi Marciano, Philipp Moog, Bill Nighy, David Suchet, John le Carré	
O C T O B E R	19	The Razor's Edge	Columbia Pictures	John Byrum (director/screenplay); Bill Murray (screenplay); Bill Murray, Theresa Russell, Catherine Hicks, Denholm Elliott, James Keach, Peter Vaughan, Brian Doyle-Murray, Faith Brook, Saeed Jaffrey, Richard Oldfield, André Maranne, Bruce Boa	
O C T O B E R	19	Stop Making Sense	Arnold Stiefel Company / Cinecom Pictures / Palm Pictures	Jonathan Demme (director/screenplay); Talking Heads (screenplay); Talking Heads	
O C T O B E R	19	Thief of Hearts	Paramount Pictures / Simpson/Bruckheimer	Douglas Day Stewart (director/screenplay); Steven Bauer, Barbara Williams, John Getz, David Caruso, Christine Ebersole, George Wendt	
O C T O B E R	26	American Dreamer	Warner Bros. / CBS Theatrical Films	Rick Rosenthal (director); David Greenwalt, Jim Kouf (screenplay); JoBeth Williams, Tom Conti, Giancarlo Giannini, Coral Browne, James Staley, C. D. Barnes, Huckleberry Fox, Jean Rougerie, Pierre Santini, Léon Zitrone, André Valardy, Jeffrey Kramer, Nancy Stephens	
O C T O B E R	26	Body Double	Columbia Pictures / Delphi II Productions	Brian De Palma (director/screenplay); Robert J. Avrech (screenplay); Craig Wasson, Gregg Henry, Melanie Griffith, Deborah Shelton, Guy Boyd, Dennis Franz, David Haskell, Al Israel, Douglas Warhit, B. J. Jones, Russ Marin, Lane Davies, Barbara Crampton, Larry "Flash" Jenkins, Monte Landis, Slavitza Jovan, Rob Paulsen	
O C T O B E R	26	Firstborn	Paramount Pictures	Michael Apted (director); Ron Koslow (screenplay); Teri Garr, Peter Weller, Christopher Collet, Corey Haim, Sarah Jessica Parker, Robert Downey Jr., Chris Gartin, James Harper, J.D. Roth, Josh Hamilton, Ned Eisenberg	
O C T O B E R	26	Give My Regards to Broad Street	20th Century Fox / MPL Communications	Peter Webb (director); Paul McCartney (screenplay); Paul McCartney, Bryan Brown, Ringo Starr, Barbara Bach, Linda McCartney, Philip Jackson, Giant Haystacks, Tracey Ullman, Ralph Richardson, George Martin, John Bennett, John Burgess, Ian Hastings, Marie Collett, Graham Dene, Anthony Bate, Leonard Fenton, Jeremy Child, John Salthouse, John Paul Jones, Eric Stewart, Jeffrey Daniel	
O C T O B E R	26	Paris, Texas	20th Century Fox / Road Movies / Filmproduktion GmbH / Argos Films S.A.	Wim Wenders (director); L. M. Kit Carson, Sam Shepard (screenplay); Harry Dean Stanton, Nastassja Kinski, Dean Stockwell, Aurore Clément, Hunter Carson, Bernhard Wicki, John Lurie, Socorro Valdez, Viva, Mydolls, Sam Berry, Claresie Mobley, Edward Fayton, Justin Hogg, Tom Farrell, Jeni Vici, Sally Norvell	
O C T O B E R	26	Streetwise	Angelika Films	Martin Bell (director); Cheryl McCall (screenplay); Roberta Joseph Hayes, Dewayne Pomeroy, "Little Justin" Reed Early, Lou Ellen "Lulu" Coach, Patti, Rat, Shadow, Erin "Tiny" Blackwell, Patrice Pitts	
O C T O B E R	26	The Terminator	Orion Pictures / Hemdale / Pacific Western Productions / Cinema '84	James Cameron (director/screenplay); Gale Anne Hurd (screenplay); Arnold Schwarzenegger, Michael Biehn, Linda Hamilton, Paul Winfield, Lance Henriksen, Earl Boen, Bess Motta, Rick Rossovich, Dick Miller, Franco Columbu, Bill Paxton, Brian Thompson, Marianne Muellerleile, Shawn Schepps	
O C T O B E R	26	Terror in the Aisles	Universal Pictures / Kaleidoscope Films	Andrew J. Kuehn (director); Margery Doppelt (screenplay); Donald Pleasence, Nancy Allen	
O C T O B E R	26	The Times of Harvey Milk	TC Films International	Rob Epstein (director/screenplay); Carter Wilson, Judith Coburn (screenplay); Harvey Fierstein, Anne Kronenberg, Tom Ammiano, Bill Kraus, Sally M. Gearhart, Dianne Feinstein, Harvey Milk, George Moscone, Dan White, John Briggs, Jimmy Carter, Tory Hartmann, Jim Elliot, Henry Der, Jeannine Yeomans	
N O V E M B E R	2	The Killing Fields	Warner Bros. / Goldcrest Films / International Film Investors / Enigma Productions	Roland Joffé (director); Bruce Robinson (screenplay); Sam Waterston, Haing S. Ngor, Craig T. Nelson, John Malkovich, Julian Sands, Spalding Gray, Bill Patterson, Athol Fugard, Graham Kennedy, Patrick Malahide, Nell Campbell, Joanna Merlin	
N O V E M B E R	9	A Nightmare on Elm Street	New Line Cinema / Media Home Entertainment / Smart Egg Pictures	Wes Craven (director/screenplay); Robert Englund, John Saxon, Ronee Blakley, Heather Langenkamp, Amanda Wyss, Nick Corri, Johnny Depp, Joe Unger, Joseph Whipp, Charles Fleischer, Lin Shaye, Leslie Hoffman, David Andrews, Ash Adams, Don Hannah, Chris Tashima, Robert Shaye, Mimi Craven, Jack Shea, Ed Call, Sandy Lipton, Jeff Levine, Donna Woodrum, Paul Grenier, Shashawnee Hall, Brian Reise, Carol Pritikin, Kathi Gibbs, John Richard Peterson, Antonia Yannouli	
N O V E M B E R	9	Silent Night, Deadly Night	Tri-Star Pictures / Slayride Productions Inc.	Charles E. Sellier Jr. (director); Michael Hickey (screenplay); Lilyan Chauvin, Gilmer McCormick, Britt Leach, Nancy Borgenicht, Linnea Quigley, Will Hare, Tara Buckman, Charles Dierkop, Don Shanks, Judith Roberts, Robert Brian Wilson, Alex Burton, Toni Nero, Geoff Hansen, Danny Wagner, Jonathan Best, Max Broadhead, Melissa Best	
N O V E M B E R	9	No Small Affair	Columbia Pictures	Jerry Schatzberg (director); Craig Bolotin (screenplay); Jon Cryer, Demi Moore, George Wendt, Peter Frechette, E. G. Daily, Ann Wedgeworth, Jeffrey Tambor, Tim Robbins, Hamilton Camp, Scott Getlin, Judith Baldwin, Jennifer Tilly, Kene Holliday, Tate Donovan, Thomas Adams, Myles Berkowitz, Arthur Taxier	
N O V E M B E R	9	Oh, God! You Devil	Warner Bros.	Paul Bogart (director); Andrew Bergman (screenplay); George Burns, Ted Wass, Ron Silver, Roxanne Hart, Eugene Roche, Janet Brandt, Robert Desiderio, John Doolittle, Julie Lloyd, Belita Moreno, Jason Wingreen, Susan Peretz, Robert Picardo, Arthur Malet, James Cromwell, Arnold Johnson, Brandy Gold, Lois Wilde	
N O V E M B E R	16	Just the Way You Are	MGM/UA	Édouard Molinaro (director); Allan Burns (screenplay); Kristy McNichol, Michael Ontkean, Kaki Hunter, André Dussollier, Catherine Salviat, Robert Carradine, Alexandra Paul, Lance Guest, Tim Daly, Patrick Cassidy, Gérard Jugnot, André Oumansky, Billy Kearns, Joyce Gordon, Wayne Robson, Jean-Claude Ostrander, Garrick Dowhen	
N O V E M B E R	16	B.C. Rock	Almi Pictures	Tony Hendra (screenplay); Jim Vallely, Jonathan Schmock, Joseph Plewa	
N O V E M B E R	16	Missing in Action	The Cannon Group, Inc.	Joseph Zito (director); James Bruner (screenplay); Chuck Norris, M. Emmet Walsh, David Tress, Lenore Kasdorf, Ernie Ortega, James Hong, Erich Anderson	
N O V E M B E R	16	Night of the Comet	Atlantic Releasing Corporation / Thomas Coleman and Michael Rosenblatt Productions / Film Development Fund	Thom Eberhardt (director/screenplay); Robert Beltran, Catherine Mary Stewart, Kelli Maroney, Sharon Farrell, Mary Woronov, Geoffrey Lewis, Peter Fox, John Achorn, Michael Bowen, Devon Ericson, Lissa Layng, Janice Kawaye, Chance Boyer, Ivan E. Roth, Dick Rude, Chris Pedersen, Marc Poppel	
N O V E M B E R	16	Night Patrol	RSL Company / Vis Arts Consultants Inc. / New World Pictures	Jackie Kong (director/screenplay); Murray Langston, William A. Levey, Bill Osco (screenplay); Linda Blair, Pat Paulsen, Billy Barty, Murray Langston, Pat Morita, Andrew Dice Clay, Jaye P. Morgan, Vic Dunlop	
N O V E M B E R	18	Fatal Vision	NBC Productions	David Greene (director); John Gay (screenplay); Gary Cole, Karl Malden, Eva Marie Saint, Barry Newman, Wendy Schaal, Andy Griffith, Judith Barsi, Gary Grubbs, Joel Polis, Mitchell Ryan, Scott Paulin, Barry Corbin, Albert Salmi, Paddi Edwards, Carmen Argenziano, Nadine van der Velde, Laurence Haddon, Kenneth Tigar, Roy London, Robert Clotworthy, Steve James, Richard Lineback, James Morrison, Paul Ryan, Miguel Sandoval, Brian Thompson	
N O V E M B E R	21	A Christmas Story (re-release)	MGM/UA	Bob Clark (director/screenplay); Jean Shepherd, Leigh Brown (screenplay); Peter Billingsley, Jean Shepherd, Melinda Dillon, Darren McGavin, Ian Petrella, Scott Schwartz, R. D. Robb, Zack Ward, Yano Anaya, Tedde Moore, Jeff Gillen, Leslie Carlson	
N O V E M B E R	21	Falling in Love	Paramount Pictures	Ulu Grosbard (director); Michael Cristofer (screenplay); Robert De Niro, Meryl Streep, Dianne Wiest, David Clennon, Jane Kaczmarek, George Martin, Harvey Keitel, Victor Argo, Jesse Bradford, Roganda Mart	
N O V E M B E R	21	Supergirl	Tri-Star Pictures	Jeannot Szwarc (director); David Odell (screenplay); Faye Dunaway, Helen Slater, Hart Bochner, Peter Cook, Mia Farrow, Marc McClure, Brenda Vaccaro, Peter O'Toole, Simon Ward, Maureen Teefy, David Healy, Sandra Dickinson, Matt Frewer, Kelly Hunter, Glory Annen	
N O V E M B E R	25	Caravan of Courage: An Ewok Adventure	ABC / 20th Television / Lucasfilm / Korty Films	John Korty (director); Bob Carrau (screenplay); Warwick Davis, Eric Walker, Fionnula Flanagan, Guy Boyd, Debbie Lee Carrington, Tony Cox, Burl Ives, Darryl Henriques, Aubree Miller, Daniel Frishman, Kevin Thompson, Margarita Fernández, Pam Grizz, Bobby Bell, Sydney Walker	
D E C E M B E R	5	Beverly Hills Cop	Paramount Pictures / Simpson/Bruckheimer / Eddie Murphy Productions	Martin Brest (director); Daniel Petrie Jr. (screenplay); Eddie Murphy, Judge Reinhold, John Ashton, Lisa Eilbacher, Ronny Cox, Steven Berkoff, James Russo, Jonathan Banks, Stephen Elliott, Gilbert R. Hill, Bronson Pinchot, Paul Reiser, Michael Champion, Frank Pesce, Michael Gregory, Karen Mayo-Chandler, Randy Vasquez, Damon Wayans, Rick Overton, Mike Pniewski, Douglas Warhit, Tom Everett, Thomas J. Hageboeck, Martin Brest, Earl Jolly Brown	
D E C E M B E R	7	2010	MGM/UA	Peter Hyams (director/screenplay); Roy Scheider, John Lithgow, Helen Mirren, Bob Balaban, Keir Dullea, Douglas Rain, Madolyn Smith, Dana Elcar, Taliesin Jaffe, James McEachin, Natasha Shneider, Vladimir Skomarovsky, Mary Jo Deschanel, Elya Baskin, Saveliy Kramarov, Oleg Rudnik, Victor Steinbach, Jan Triska, Herta Ware, Robert Lesser, Candice Bergen, Arthur C. Clarke, Gary Lockwood	
D E C E M B E R	7	City Heat	Warner Bros. / The Malpaso Company	Richard Benjamin (director); Blake Edwards ("Sam O. Brown"), Joseph C. Stinson (screenplay); Clint Eastwood, Burt Reynolds, Jane Alexander, Madeline Kahn, Rip Torn, Irene Cara, Richard Roundtree, Tony Lo Bianco, William Sanderson, Nicholas Worth, Robert Davi, Art LaFleur, Jack Nance, Tab Thacker, John Hancock, Jack Thibeau, Gerald S. O'Loughlin, Bruce M. Fischer, Ernie Sabella, Carey Loftin, Hamilton Camp, Gene LeBell, Nick Dimitri, Arthur Malet, Beau Starr, Wiley Harker	
D E C E M B E R	14	The Cotton Club	Orion Pictures / Totally Independent Productions / American Zoetrope / Producers Sales Organization	Francis Ford Coppola (director/screenplay); William Kennedy (screenplay); Richard Gere, Gregory Hines, Diane Lane, Lonette McKee, Bob Hoskins, James Remar, Nicolas Cage, Allen Garfield, Fred Gwynne, Gwen Verdon, Lisa Jane Persky, Maurice Hines, Julian Beck, Joe Dallesandro, Larry Fishburne, Tom Waits, John P. Ryan, Glenn Withrow, Jennifer Grey, Woody Strode, Diane Venora, Tucker Smallwood, Bill Cobbs, Rosalind Harris, Mark Margolis, Larry Marshall	
D E C E M B E R	14	Dune	Universal Pictures / Dino De Laurentiis Corporation	David Lynch (director/screenplay); Francesca Annis, Leonardo Cimino, Brad Dourif, José Ferrer, Linda Hunt, Freddie Jones, Richard Jordan, Kyle MacLachlan, Virginia Madsen, Silvana Mangano, Everett McGill, Kenneth McMillan, Jack Nance, Siân Phillips, Jürgen Prochnow, Paul Smith, Patrick Stewart, Sting, Dean Stockwell, Max von Sydow, Alicia Roanne Witt, Sean Young, Danny Corkill, Honorato Magalone, Judd Omen, Molly Wryn, Angélica Aragón, Humberto Elizondo, Ernesto Laguardia, David Lynch, Ana Ofelia Murguía, Claudia Ramírez, Julieta Rosen, Jacqueline Voltaire	
D E C E M B E R	14	Mass Appeal	Universal Pictures	Glenn Jordan (director); Bill C. Davis (screenplay); Jack Lemmon, Željko Ivanek, Charles Durning, Louise Latham, Talia Balsam, Alice Hirson, Lois De Banzie, Jerry Hardin, R. J. Williams, Noni White, Gloria Stuart, John Vargas, John C. Becher	
D E C E M B E R	14	1984	20th Century Fox / Virgin Films / Umbrella-Rosenblum Films	Michael Radford (director/screenplay); John Hurt, Richard Burton, Suzanna Hamilton, Cyril Cusack, Gregor Fisher, James Walker, Andrew Wilde, Merelina Kendall, John Boswall, Phyllis Logan, Roger Lloyd-Pack, Bob Flag, Pam Gems, Pip Donaghy, Janet Key, Hugh Walters, Shirley Stelfox, Corinna Seddon, Martha Parsey, Matthew Scurfield, Garry Cooper, Rolf Saxon, Annie Lennox	
D E C E M B E R	14	A Passage to India	Columbia Pictures / Thorn EMI Screen Entertainment / HBO Films	David Lean (director/screenplay); Judy Davis, Peggy Ashcroft, Victor Banerjee, James Fox, Alec Guinness, Nigel Havers, Michael Culver, Clive Swift, Art Malik, Saeed Jaffrey, Ann Firbank, Roshan Seth, Richard Wilson, Dina Pathak, Mohammed Ashiq, Ishaq Bux, Antonia Pemberton, Sandra Hotz, H. S. Krishnamurthy, Ashok Mandanna, Z. H. Khan, Rashid Karapiet	
D E C E M B E R	14	Runaway	Tri-Star Pictures	Michael Crichton (director/screenplay); Tom Selleck, Cynthia Rhodes, Gene Simmons, Kirstie Alley, Stan Shaw, G. W. Bailey, Joey Cramer, Chris Mulkey, Anne-Marie Martin, Michael Paul Chan, Marilyn Schreffler	
D E C E M B E R	14	Starman	Columbia Pictures	John Carpenter (director); Bruce A. Evans, Raynold Gideon, Dean Riesner (screenplay); Jeff Bridges, Karen Allen, Charles Martin Smith, Richard Jaeckel, Robert Phalen, Tony Edwards, John Walter Davis, Ted White, Dirk Blocker, M. C. Gainey, George Buck Flower, Ralph Cosham, Lu Leonard, Mickey Jones, David Wells	
D E C E M B E R	15	The Ratings Game	Showtime Networks / Imagination Productions / New Street Productions / Viacom Productions	Danny DeVito (director); Michael Barrie, Jim Mulholland (screenplay); Danny DeVito, Rhea Perlman, Gerrit Graham, Barry Corbin, Louis Giambalvo, Ronny Graham, Huntz Hall, Basil Hoffman, Kevin McCarthy, John Megna, Michael Richards, Ron Rifkin, Joe Santos, Vincent Schiavelli, Daniel Stern, Fred Scialla, Frank Sivero, Mark L. Taylor, George Wendt, Steve Allen, Jayne Meadows, Cisse Cameron, Army Archerd, Allyce Beasley, Peter Brocco, Robert Costanzo, Selma Diamond, Michael Ensign, Jason Hervey, Kenneth Kimmins, James Le Gros, Russ Marin, Randall Miller, Susan Peretz, Hal Riddle, Jerry Seinfeld, Lisle Wilson, Lee Ving, Alan Alda, Bernie Brillstein, Roy Firestone, Ed. Weinberger	
D E C E M B E R	17	A Christmas Carol	CBS / 20th Television / Entertainment Partners Ltd.	Clive Donner (director); Roger O. Hirson (screenplay); George C. Scott, Frank Finlay, David Warner, Susannah York, Edward Woodward, Roger Rees, Angela Pleasence, Michael Carter, Anthony Walters, Caroline Langrishe, Lucy Gutteridge, Nigel Davenport, Joanne Whalley, Timothy Bateson, Michael Gough, John Quarmby, Peter Woodthorpe, Liz Smith, John Sharp, Derek Francis, Brian Pettifer, Cathryn Harrison, Mark Strickson, Danny Davies, Catherine Hall	
D E C E M B E R	19	The River	Universal Pictures	Mark Rydell (director); Robert Dillon, Julian Barry (screenplay); Sissy Spacek, Mel Gibson, Scott Glenn, Shane Bailey, Becky Jo Lynch, Don Hood, Billy "Green" Bush, James Tolkan	
D E C E M B E R	21	Birdy	Tri-Star Pictures / A&M Films	Alan Parker (director); Sandy Kroopf, Jack Behr (screenplay); Matthew Modine, Nicolas Cage, John Harkins, Sandy Baron, Karen Young, Bruno Kirby, Marshall Bell, Elizabeth Whitcraft, Crystal Field, Nancy Fish, George Buck, Dolores Sage, Robert L. Ryan, James Santini, Maud Winchester, Sandra Beall, Victoria Nekko, John Brumfeld	
D E C E M B E R	21	Breakin' 2: Electric Boogaloo	Tri-Star Pictures / Cannon Films	Sam Firstenberg (director); Charles Parker, Allen DeBevoise, Jan Ventura, Julie Reichert (screenplay); Lucinda Dickey, Adolfo 'Shabba Doo' Quinones, Michael 'Boogaloo Shrimp' Chambers, Ice-T, Susie Bono, Sabrina Garcia, Cooley Jackson/Jaxson, John LaMotta, Steve "Sugarfoot" Notario, Tyler Birch	
D E C E M B E R	21	The Flamingo Kid	20th Century Fox / ABC Motion Pictures	Garry Marshall (director/screenplay); Neal Marshall (screenplay); Matt Dillon, Héctor Elizondo, Richard Crenna, Jessica Walter, Janet Jones, Brian McNamara, Fisher Stevens, Bronson Pinchot, Marisa Tomei, Steven Weber, Martha Gehman, Leon Robinson, Molly McCarthy, Carole Davis, Frank Campanella, Richard Stahl, Joe Grifasi, Ron McLarty, Seth Allen, Adam Klugman, Ray Roderick, Irving Metzman, Googy Gress, Eric Douglas, Tracy Reiner, Kristina Kossi, Brad Kane, Steve Witting, Novella Nelson	
D E C E M B E R	21	Johnny Dangerously	20th Century Fox	Amy Heckerling (director); Harry Colomby, Jeff Harris, Bernie Kukoff, Norman Steinberg (screenplay); Michael Keaton, Joe Piscopo, Marilu Henner, Maureen Stapleton, Peter Boyle, Griffin Dunne, Glynnis O'Connor, Dom DeLuise, Richard Dimitri, Danny DeVito, Ron Carey, Ray Walston, Dick Butkus, Byron Thames, Alan Hale Jr., Scott Thomson, Sudie Bond, Hank Garrett, Leonard Termo, Neal Israel, Jack Nance, Rick Rosenthal, Carl Gottlieb, Jeffrey Weissman, Bob Eubanks, James Coco, Joe Flaherty, Taylor Negron, Vincent Schiavelli	
D E C E M B E R	21	Micki & Maude	Columbia Pictures	Blake Edwards (director); Jonathan Reynolds (screenplay); Dudley Moore, Amy Irving, Ann Reinking, Richard Mulligan, George Gaynes, Wallace Shawn, Hard Boiled Haggerty, John Pleshette, Lu Leonard, Priscilla Pointer, Robert Symonds, George Coe, Billy Beck, Ken Olfson, Emma Walton Hamilton, Andre Rousimmoff, Big John Studd, Chief Jay Strongbow, Gene LeBell, Wiley Harker, Roger Rose	
D E C E M B E R	21	Pinocchio (re-release)	Walt Disney Productions	Ben Sharpsteen, Hamilton Luske, Bill Roberts, Norman Ferguson; Jack Kinney, Wilfred Jackson, T. Hee (directors); Ted Sears, Otto Englander, Webb Smith, William Cottrell, Joseph Sabo, Erdman Penner, Aurelius Battaglia (screenplay); Cliff Edwards, Dickie Jones, Christian Rub, Mel Blanc, Walter Catlett, Charles Judels, Evelyn Venable, Frankie Darro, Stuart Buchanan	
D E C E M B E R	21	Protocol	Warner Bros.	Herbert Ross (director); Buck Henry (screenplay); Goldie Hawn, Chris Sarandon, Richard Romanus, Andre Gregory, Gail Strickland, Cliff DeYoung, Keith Szarabajka, Ed Begley Jr., Kenneth Mars, Jean Smart, Joel Brooks, Grainger Hines, Kenneth McMillan, James Staley, Maria O'Brien	
D E C E M B E R	26	Mrs. Soffel	MGM/UA	Gillian Armstrong (director); Ron Nyswaner (screenplay); Diane Keaton, Mel Gibson, Matthew Modine, Edward Herrmann, Trini Alvarado, Jennifer Dundas, Danny Corkill, Harley Cross, Terry O'Quinn, Pippa Pearthree, William Youmans, Maury Chaykin, Joyce Ebert, Wayne Robson, Dana Wheeler-Nicholson, Les Rubie, Paula Trueman, Katie McCombs, William Duell, Walter Massey	

== See also ==
- List of 1984 box office number-one films in the United States
- 1984 in the United States
