= Tommy Jarvis =

- Friday the 13th character
- Thom Mathews as Tommy Jarvis in Friday the 13th Part VI: Jason Lives
- First appearance: Friday the 13th: The Final Chapter (1984)
- Last appearance: Friday the 13th: The Game (2017)
- Created by: Bruce Hidemi Sakow
- Portrayed by: Corey Feldman (1984, 1985); John Shepherd (1985); Thom Mathews (1986–present)
- Voiced by: Thom Matthews (in-game); Chris Niosi (audio tapes)

In-universe information
- Full name: Thomas "Tommy" Jarvis (Note: The names Thomas and Malcolm are given in the "Pamela tapes" in Friday the 13th: The Game.)
- Family: Malcolm Jarvis (father; unknown); Tracy Jarvis (mother; deceased); Patricia "Trish" Jarvis (sister)
- Status: Alive

Tommy Jarvis is a fictional character in the Friday the 13th franchise. He first appears in Friday the 13th: The Final Chapter (1984) as a child interested in special effects who encounters a seemingly unstoppable slasher—Jason Voorhees (Ted White). In his debut, he is portrayed by Corey Feldman. A teen and adult version of the character is portrayed by John Shepherd and Thom Mathews in the consecutive films Friday the 13th: A New Beginning (1985) and Friday the 13th Part VI: Jason Lives (1986), respectively.

He appears in three of the twelve Friday the 13th films—becoming the series protagonist and the archenemy of Jason, with early protagonist Alice Hardy (Adrienne King) only returning for one film. The original ending for Friday the 13th: A New Beginning (1985) had Tommy become the antagonist in subsequent sequels, but was dismissed as being too detracting. Outside of the films, Tommy is a main character in the comic book adaptations and novels. He is a playable character in the video game Friday the 13th: The Game, with Mathews reprising his role.

== Appearances ==
=== In film ===
Tommy Jarvis in Friday the 13th: The Final Chapter (1984)

Tommy Jarvis first appears in Friday the 13th: The Final Chapter as a young boy (played by Corey Feldman), residing with his divorced mother Tracy (Joan Freeman) and sister Trish (Kimberly Beck), with an affinity for making his own masks and make-up effects. When Jason Voorhees (Ted White) appears and kills both Tracy and a group of teenagers partying in the house next door, Tommy is forced to fight for his life along with Trish. In an attempt to trick Jason, Tommy shaves his head to make himself appear as young Jason, which works for a time, confusing the killer. Ultimately, Tommy kills Jason by slamming a machete into the side of his head, on which Jason splits his head upon falling down on the blade. When he and Trish embrace, he notices Jason's fingers slowly move and he begins to hack away at his body.

By the events of Friday the 13th: A New Beginning, Tommy's encounter with Jason has seriously affected his psyche, and he was put in several mental institutions, none of which were able to help him overcome his fear of Jason. He is eventually put in a halfway house, but unfortunately, at this time, a series of murders begin nearby with Jason (Tom Morga) being tied to the killings. Tommy's mind continues to slip again, seeing images of Jason haunting him. Tommy (played by John Shepherd) manages to confront the hockey-masked murderer, believing him to be another hallucination. But he is real and attacks Tommy, finally forcing him to take his life - only for it to turn out that the killer was a copycat named Roy Burns (Dick Wieand). But it's too late for Tommy, as the last wall of sanity has fallen with the ghost of Jason fading before his eyes. Keeping the killer's hockey mask, he puts it on and attempts to assume Jason's mantle, but he is thankfully caught and treated before things go too far.

In Friday the 13th Part VI: Jason Lives, a more stable adult Tommy (played by Thom Mathews), with Allen Hawes (Ron Palillo) a friend from the institution, is ready to confront his demons - or rather the demon that is Jason (C. J. Graham). Wanting to see Jason's decayed body himself, he also wants to make sure that Jason will never rise again and attempts to cremate him. But his memories of his encounter with Jason still linger heavily and he madly attacks the body with a metal fence pole when the coffin is opened. Before Tommy can cremate Jason, the pole winds up attracting bolts of lightning that unfortunately reawakens Jason as a zombie now and gives him a more powerful lease on life; he has become impervious even to being shot at point-blank range with a shotgun - though he still feels the impact of the bullets - and now possesses supernaturally powerful strength and healing factor to aid in slaughtering his victims with. Trying to make amends for his mistake, Tommy warns Sheriff Mike Garris (David Kagen) who, being familiar with Jarvis, locks him up thinking he's had another mental breakdown. The piles of bodies Jason racks up only convince Sheriff Garris that the killer is Tommy. Time is running short as Jason makes his way to the renamed campgrounds. With a plan in mind, and aided by Garris' daughter Megan (Jennifer Cooke), Tommy lures Jason into the very same lake from which the Voorhees legend started, chaining Jason to the bottom of the lake by a large stone, encircled in fire, and having part of his face chewed by the boat's propeller blades. Although almost nearly dying from Jason's attacks during the struggle, Megan rescues him from the waters and revives him with CPR much to her and the camp's children's joy; as he embraces her, he finally exclaims "It's over, it's finally over... Jason's home." as the two stare off at the lake where Jason remains trapped.

=== Fan films ===
Thom Mathews reprises his role as Tommy in the non-canonical Friday the 13th fan film Never Hike Alone, released in 2017. The short film takes place several decades after Jason Lives, and sees Tommy working as an ambulance driver. Near the end of the film, he picks up Jason (Vincente DiSanti)'s latest victim, Kyle McLeod (Andrew Leighty), who barely survived his encounter with the mass murderer. When Jason returns and kills Axel Macauley (Robert DuBois) and Deni Morgan (Katie Schwartz), the two other paramedics in the ambulance, he recognizes Tommy, who taunts him before driving off. In 2020, the character appeared in the prequel film, Never Hike in the Snow, which takes place 3 months before Never Hike Alone. Tommy also plays a major role in the sequel Never Hike Alone 2, which was released on October 13, 2023.

Tommy features as an offscreen presence in the fan film Friday the 13th: Vengeance, when he disappears to investigate the possibility that Jason (Jason Brooks) has returned, prompting his older daughter Angelica (Kelly Tappan) to go out and search for him alongside the family members of some of Jason's other past victims/enemies, such as Ginny Fields (Amy Steel)'s niece Heather (Natalie Schnelle). This film also features the appearance of Jason's father, Elias (C. J. Graham), revealing that he used black magic to bring his son back to life. The sequel, Vengeance 2: Bloodlines, features Thom Matthews returning as Tommy when he must face off against Elias's plans for revenge. The final confrontation sees Elias attempt to use the same black magic that resurrected Jason to bring Pamela back to life, but this attempt ends with Elias being killed and Jason being apparently killed for good when they recreate the circumstances of Jason's original resurrection, to the extent of impaling him with the same metal pole that was originally struck by lightning to reanimate him.

=== In literature ===
In the novelization of Friday the 13th Part VI: Jason Lives, it is revealed what happened between Tommy and Pam Roberts (Melanie Kinnaman) at the end of Friday the 13th: A New Beginning; the book explains that Pam had managed to return Tommy to his senses and, when Tommy was put back in a mental institution, she helped him recover. The novel Friday the 13th: Carnival of Maniacs references Tommy, revealing he has written at least six books about Jason and Crystal Lake, with the title of one of them being mentioned as My Life of Hell: One Man's Fight Against Jason Voorhees, which is described as a "whiny piece of garbage" by the character Alice Jane Witney. In the mockumentary called The Crystal Lake Massacres Revisited (included on the 2009 DVD extra) it is mentioned that Tommy was thought to be the killer in Friday the 13th Part VI: Jason Lives by the local town folk. It also talks about Tommy's stay at the state mental hospital, and how due to overcrowding he was sent to Pinehurst. Tommy faces Jason again in the comic miniseries Freddy vs. Jason vs. Ash: Nightmare Warriors. When Jason attacks Dr. Maggie Burroughs' group for those who have survived Jason Voorhees and Freddy Krueger, Tommy intervenes and reveals his intent to finish Jason off, ultimately decapitating him with the help of Jason's great-niece, Stephanie. After both Freddy and Jason are defeated, Tommy is appointed leader of the Nightmare Warriors by Ash Williams.

=== In video games ===
Tommy is a playable character in the video game Friday the 13th: The Game, making him one of five playable characters from the films, alongside Jason Voorhees, Roy Burns, Fox (Gloria Charles), and Sheldon "Shelly" Finkelstein (Larry Zerner). Thom Mathews, who portrayed Tommy Jarvis in Part VI, reprised his role. Tommy is a special character, and only one of the players who have either died or escaped can play as him, after contacting him from a randomly placed CB radio; he has the best stats out of all survivors, and when spawned, comes equipped with a shotgun, pocket knife, radio, map, and first aid spray. Tommy is also the only character who can kill Jason, although this only can be accomplished if Jason has lost his mask due to heavy damage, as well as a feminine character finding Jason's shack, taking the sweater, then "enchanting" Jason into thinking she is Pamela Voorhees whilst Tommy attacks.

The game also features collectible cassette tapes known as the "Tommy Tapes" written by filmmaker Adam Green and starring voice actor and animator Chris Niosi as Tommy Jarvis. The tapes feature audio recordings of Tommy at various points in his life, from after the events of Part 4 and until shortly after Part 6, thus filling in most gaps between the films. They also provide an explanation for Part 5's ending where Tommy states that he only dreamed about killing Pam and had never actually done so. Tommy's claims of Jason Voorhees being the killer from the events of Parts 2 through 4 are dismissed due to the logical absurdity of Jason being alive in spite of him drowning as a child, and the murders are instead blamed on an unidentified copycat killer. His claims of Jason rising from the grave in Part 6 are further dismissed, and soon Tommy is blamed for exacerbating Jason's legend and attracting more copycats. Tommy is then sent to several mental institutions, including Glen Echo, New Orleans Psychiatric, and Smith's Grove, before finally being committed to Springwood Mental Institution, paranoid the authorities are trying to cover up Jason's existence; while institutionalized at the latter, he inexplicably begins lacerating himself in his sleep. The tapes also reveal the fate of Tommy's sister Trish who, unlike him, moved on from her trauma caused by Jason and went to college; she remained in contact with Tommy, but eventually stopped talking to him after he was institutionalized in Springwood.

== Development ==
The character of Tommy Jarvis was initially conceived by writer Bruce Hidemi Sakow, who came in early during the film's pre-production. According to him,

"The major contribution I made to the script was with the Tommy Jarvis character and the relationship he had with his mother and sister and Jason. It was my idea to have this little kid kill off Jason, because we've seen Jason kill of loads of young adults so who else but a kid?"

Originally, Joseph Zito planned for Tommy to become the antagonist and "new Jason" in any subsequent Friday the 13th films created after the fourth. The ending of Friday the 13th: A New Beginning leads up to this, although due to the negative reaction to that film, the idea was dropped. According to Zito, the possibility of Tommy going the route of becoming "the new Jason" was his idea, as a type of insurance policy for a possible continuation of the film series, saying: "It was my fault. No one at Paramount had any interest in making more films and Frank Mancuso, Sr. told me as much during the difficult editing process. Basically, they were kind of embarrassed by the films even though they were very profitable. It was my idea to film the ending with Tommy because I wanted to leave the door slightly open just in case. I never imagined that there would be so many sequels made after that though. None of us had any idea."

Adam Marcus, director of Jason Goes to Hell: The Final Friday, has revealed that he had originally intended for the film's male protagonist Steven Freeman (John D. LeMay) to be Tommy Jarvis, but could not include him because New Line Cinema did not own the rights to Tommy's character at that time and so was forced to write a new character and name for the film.

Tommy Jarvis was referenced in the script for Freddy vs Jason, the dialogue insinuating that he is running a petition to have the reopening of Camp Crystal Lake annulled. He is called a "lunatic" by an executive at the building site at the camp, but this dialogue ultimately never made it into the theatrical film. The producers of the 2009 Friday the 13th reboot considered using the Tommy character, but decided not to because they wanted to create their own mythology.

== Casting ==
Casting director Fern Champion says on the Crystal Lake Memories documentary that she felt that she and Corey Feldman clicked, but Feldman was informed by his mother Sheila that the producers had concerns that he was too small to look believable in finishing Jason off, but got the role after showing them his prowess in wielding the machete. According to director Danny Steinmann, the casting for Tommy in A New Beginning went on till the eleventh hour: "I went through fifty Tommys before we found John Shepherd. We didn't get this Tommy until the last day before we started filming. We were panic-stricken. Everything hinged around this kid being sensitive and believable. If we had gone with the Tommy we were about to settle on, the picture would have been unreleasable."

For Jason Lives, actor John Shepherd did not reprise his role from part 5 as he chose to abstain from it for personal reasons: "I was at a crossroads in my life where I was trying to decide - do I really wanna pursue acting or, you know, is this the best use of my time and talents? So I made a conscious decision on part six: 'You know what, I'm gonna pass on this'." Jason Lives' writer/director Tom McLoughlin claims to not have been aware of why producer Frank Mancuso Jr. chose to not bring John Shepherd back for the role for Jason Lives, but the latter states that he rejected the role indirectly by telling his agent to demand an extravagant salary for his continued participation. His replacement Thom Mathews had not seen A New Beginning until after he was cast, and claims that he thought the film was awful and wondered if he had made a mistake, but liked the script for Jason Lives so much that he decided to play the role anyway. In an interview, Mathews discussed his preparation for the role, stating:

"...I didn’t really feel a lot of pressure. I really liked the script a lot, Tom (McLoughlin) did a great job and it spoke to me. I knew what I wanted to do. It was probably the closest character that I’ve played to myself. I had a great experience and going to just outside of Atlanta and shooting for six weeks. It was a blast.
When I saw Part V, I wasn’t thrilled and I was kind of scared. After I was hired, I started to do research and I looked at Part V and thought… oh no. I spoke to Tom and he told me what he wanted to do and everything was a lot better. In Part V, there was no lighting and the story was kind of weak. Maybe I should go back and look at it again. Maybe I’d have a different opinion of it now. But it scared the hell out of me."

== Reception ==
Tommy has received considerably positive reviews from critics. In Horror Films of the 1980s, Volume 1, John Kenneth Muir praised the character, stating:

"It's a natural development that Corey Feldman's Tommy Jarvis, a pre-pubescent boy who loves horror movies and even makes monster masks himself, plays such a critical role in Friday the 13th: The Final Chapter. After all, kids Tommy's age had been hearing from older siblings since 1980 about the Friday the 13th movies, and in 1984 were just discovering them through the expanding market of home video. A slightly younger fan base was developing and would keep the series strong through the decade, one represented by kids in Tommy Jarvis's age bracket. So it makes sense that the filmmakers would adjust tactics slightly in this case, switching focus from a final girl to a resourceful younger brother."

He also notes the popularity of the fourth film being because of Tommy's debut in the series:

"Many fans like this Friday the 13th installment the best, because it introduces the Jarvis character (a surrogate for the male viewers), and because it features a memorable coup de grâce for Jason. Tommy slices Jason's head (ouch!) and then - in a slow-motion shot echoing Alice's mad dash with the machete at the end of the first film - chops off his head."

In Legacy of Blood: A Comprehensive Guide to Slasher Movies, Jim Harper was rather mixed in terms of the character's performances. He criticized Corey Feldman's performance as Tommy in The Final Chapter stating, "Only Corey Feldman disappoints, since his character is highly annoying and doesn't really fit into the picture." However he praised Thom Mathews' performance in Jason Lives, calling him a "great character".

== Merchandise ==
Mezco Toyz has released a statuette of both Tommy and Jason Voorhees, depicting the scene of the two battling each other underwater from Friday the 13th Part VI: Jason Lives.
