= Red Scorpion =

1989 film by Joseph Zito

- Theatrical release poster
- Directed by: Joseph Zito
- Written by: Jack Abramoff; Robert Abramoff; Arne Olsen
- Produced by: Jack Abramoff
- Starring: Dolph Lundgren; M. Emmet Walsh; Al White; T. P. McKenna; Carmen Argenziano; Alex Colon; Brion James
- Cinematography: João Fernandes
- Edited by: Daniel Loewenthal
- Music by: Jay Chattaway
- Production company: Moonrose Film Productions
- Distributed by: Shapiro-Glickenhaus Entertainment; Troma Entertainment (Current rights holder)
- Release dates: December 1988 (South Korea); April 21, 1989 (United States)
- Running time: 102 minutes
- Country: United States
- Language: English
- Box office: $4.2 million

Red Scorpion is a 1988 American action film starring Dolph Lundgren and directed by Joseph Zito. Lundgren appears as a Soviet special forces ("Spetsnaz") operative sent to assassinate an anti-communist rebel leader in Africa, only to side with the rebels. It was produced by lobbyist Jack Abramoff and controversially filmed in South West Africa with the support of the apartheid-era South African government. The film was released in the United States on April 21, 1989. It is the first installment in the Red Scorpion film series.

== Plot ==
Lieutenant Nikolai Petrovitch Rachenko, a Soviet Spetsnaz operative from Ukraine, is sent to an African country in which Soviet and Cuban forces are helping the government fight an anti-communist rebel movement. He is tasked with the mission to assassinate the rebel leader. Rachenko stirs up trouble in the local bar and gets arrested for disorderly conduct. He is put in the same cell as a captured resistance commander and gains his trust in facilitating the escape. Upon finally reaching the rebel encampment, he is met with distrust by the rebels. During the night, he attempts to assassinate his target, but the distrustful rebels anticipate his actions.

Disgraced and tortured by his commanding officers for failing his mission, he breaks out of the interrogation chamber and escapes to the desert, later to be found by native Bushmen. He soon learns about them and their culture, and after he receives a ceremonial burn scar in the form of a scorpion (hence the title), he joins the rebels and leads an attack against the Soviet camp after a previous attack on the peaceful bushmen. Nikolai obtains an experimental assault rifle from the armory, confronts his corrupt officers and hunts down Colonel General Oleg Vortek, who attempts to escape in a Mil Mi-24 Hind, only to be shot down after takeoff. Nikolai defeats and kills Vortek, as the rebels finally defeat the Soviet forces who were assisting the government.

== Cast ==
- Dolph Lundgren as Lieutenant Nikolai Petrovitch Rachenko
- Al White as Kallunda Kintash
- M. Emmet Walsh as Dewey Ferguson
- T. P. McKenna as General Oleg Vortek
- Anthony Fridjhon as Senior General Alfonso Callaraga
- Irene Stephano as Edelira Villarin, Stenographer
- Carmen Argenziano as Colonel Hernando Zayas
- Alex Colon as Junior Sergeant Ciro Mendez
- Brion James as Sergeant Miroslav Krasnov
- Ruben Nthodi as Ango Sundata
- Nomsa Nene as Noe Kossongo
- Elijah Dhlamini as Elano
- Regopstaan as Gao

== Production ==
=== Development ===
The film was produced by Jack Abramoff, a Republican Party lobbyist known for promoting the Reagan Doctrine and U.S. aid to anti-communist guerrilla movements such as Jonas Savimbi's National Union for the Total Independence of Angola during the Cold War. Abramoff also established the International Freedom Foundation financed by the South African apartheid regime. When Abramoff left Citizens for America, he hired Arne Olsen to write a screenplay modeled after the Angolan Civil War. The film allegedly received financial aid from South Africa as part of its propaganda efforts to undermine international sympathy for the African National Congress.

Production began in Swaziland, but was halted by the government in September 1987 after South African agents assassinated eleven ANC members in the country. Abramoff decided to shoot the film in Namibia, which was under South African occupation as South West Africa, despite filming in the country being discouraged by the Comprehensive Anti-Apartheid Act. When production resumed in 1988, Artists and Athletes Against Apartheid condemned the film for breaking the international boycott against South Africa. Warner Bros. Pictures, who had a negative pickup deal to release the picture on the condition that it was not filmed in South Africa, pulled out for the breach of their contract after anti-apartheid activists began picketing the studios.

The Namibian reported that the South African Defence Force provided military equipment to use during the production, including captured Soviet T-54 tanks. Active duty South African soldiers from Operation Crowbar also served as extras playing Soviet Army and Cuban Revolutionary Army personnel. This allegation was later confirmed by an SADF spokesman in the pro-government newspaper Republikein. Filming occurred at an SADF film studio in Windhoek and in Swakopmund.

With all the delays and productions issues, the film went over budget by 8-10 million dollars (approximately twice the initial amount).

Abramoff later claimed that he did not intend the film to contain so much violence and profanity, blaming the director. He established a short-lived "Committee for Traditional Jewish Values in Entertainment" to release films more in line with his values, but later abandoned the project, because it would not meet his standards.

== Release ==
=== Theatrical ===
Red Scorpion screened at the 1988 MIFED (Mercato internazionale del film e del documentario) film market, and was first released theatrically in South Korea in late December 1988, then the Philippines, West Germany, and Japan in January 1989, then in the United States on April 21, 1989. The movie was released theatrically worldwide except in the United Kingdom (where it went "direct to video" in January 1990).

==== Controversy ====
Though Red Scorpion was the distributor's most widely released theatrical film, it was also its most controversial. The tumult of the Apartheid Regime's involvement hadn't died down when the film was picked up by SGE and released in April 1989. Five protest groups picketed at the film's opening weekend in Washington, D.C. Protesters carried placards that read "Red Scorpion No! Freedom Yes!" and shouting "Red Scorpion is no good. Send it back to Pretoria!"

=== Home media ===
The film was released in the US on VHS and LaserDisc in August 1989 through Shapiro-Glickenhaus Entertainment Home Video. In 1993, a budget tape of the film was released by Starmaker. The movie has had at least two Region 1 DVD releases. The first DVD was released in 1998 by Simitar and the second DVD was released in 2002 by 20th Century Fox. In 2005, Tango Entertainment released a Universal Media Disc of the film for the Sony PlayStation Portable. The two DVDs are now discontinued.

The film has been released on Blu-ray special editions in the U.K. by Arrow Video on 6th Feb 2012, and in the U.S. by Synapse Films on June 12, 2012.

== Reception ==
=== Critical response ===
Leonard Maltin gave the film a "bomb" rating, citing it to be a "bottom-of-the-barrel actioner". Kevin Thomas of the Los Angeles Times described it as "a numskull live-action comic book" that, despite showing Lundgren's charisma, is likely to hurt his career. Stephen Holden of The New York Times wrote that Lundgren's physique is the film's true star, as it communicates more emotion than his acting. Noel Murray of The A.V. Club gave a more positive review, stating that "If Abramoff’s intention was to make the case for military intervention in communist-controlled countries, then Red Scorpion falls well short. But if he wanted to prove that America is the world leader in awesome pop trash, then the closing-credits soundtrack of rock ’n’ roll and artillery fire says it all. Mission accomplished."

On the review aggregator website Rotten Tomatoes, 17% of 12 critics' reviews are positive, with an average rating of 3.9/10.

== Sequel ==
A sequel, Red Scorpion 2, appeared in 1994, although the story is largely unrelated to the first installment.
