= Judith-Marie Bergan =

American actress (1948–2016)

- Born: November 25, 1948; Indianapolis, Indiana, US
- Died: August 20, 2016 (aged 67); Ashland, Oregon, US
- Education: Goodman Theatre (BFA)
- Occupation: Actress
- Years active: 1975–2016
- Spouse: João Fernandes

Judith-Marie Bergan (November 25, 1948 – August 20, 2016) was an American film, television and stage actress, known for starring in the Joseph Zito films Abduction and Bloodrage. She appeared in the television series Brothers and had a recurring role in Soap and in Maggie. Bergan was married to cinematographer João Fernandes.

== Background ==
Bergan was born in Indianapolis, Indiana on November 25, 1948. Her young to teenage years were spent there as well as in Louisville and Highland Park. Bergan received a Bachelor of Fine Arts degree in acting from the Goodman Theatre in Chicago.

== Career ==
=== Television ===
In 1977, she appeared in Charlie's Angels, playing the part of Raven in the Angels on the Air episode that also starred Nicolas Coster and John Forsythe. Between 1977 and 1978 she appeared in various episodes of Soap as Marilyn McCallam. In a December 1984 Highway to Heaven episode "Hotel of Dreams" she played Allison Rutledge, a difficult guest who unsuccessfully tried to cause trouble for the main characters. She also had a starring role in the short-lived Martin Mull sitcom, Domestic Life. It was a mid-season replacement on CBS in 1984 and lasted 10 episodes. She played Janet in the Tales from the Darkside episode "Effect and Cause" (1985). In 1987 she appeared in Days of Our Lives as Elizabeth Harley. In the 1987 TV series Hard Knocks, she played Maggie a sarcastic lady who happened to be a restaurateur and who was also an ex-con and informant.

=== Film ===
She played the lead role of Patricia Prescott in the Joseph Zito directed / Kent E. Carroll produced film Abduction, based on the Harrison James novel Black Abductor. The film came out in October 1975. She played the part of the daughter of a rich property developer who is kidnapped by a group of radicals and ends up becoming converted to their cause. In 1978 she had a role in the Delbert Mann directed Thou Shalt Not Commit Adultery, a made for television drama about the wife of a disabled man who has an extramarital affair. The following year she co-starred as Beverly Stevens in the horror film Bloodrage which was also directed by Joseph Zito.

Her final film was Finding Kelly in 2000.

=== Stage ===
In 1997, having left her television and film career she became a member of the Oregon Shakespeare Festival and took on a variety of roles and spent 16 seasons with the company.

One of the roles that she played was that of Mary in Eugene O’Neill's A Long Day's Journey Into Night, about a family which was set in or around 1912. She played the part of a mother who because of a painful birth delivery was introduced to drugs by her doctor. She would later become a woman who by the evening would regress to a drugged out almost catatonic state.

As a renowned stage actress, she was recognized by the Oregon Shakespeare Festival, who dedicated the 2017 theater season to her honor.

== Death ==
Suffering from lung cancer, Bergan died at her home in Ashland, Oregon on August 20, 2016. She was survived by her cinematographer husband, João Fernandes, as well as her two sisters, Brooke and Joan.
