= Bloodrage =

- Film poster
- Directed by: Joseph Zito
- Written by: Robert Jahn
- Produced by: Joseph Zito; Alan Braveman
- Starring: Ian Scott; Judith-Marie Bergan
- Cinematography: Joseph Scherer; João Fernandes
- Edited by: James Macreading
- Music by: Canine Tricycle Bereavement
- Production company: Picture Company of America
- Release date: 1979 (United States)
- Running time: 78 minutes
- Country: United States
- Language: English

Bloodrage, also known as Never Pick Up a Stranger, is a 1979 American horror film directed by Joseph Zito (under the pseudonym Joseph Bigwood) and written by Robert Jahn. The film stars Ian Scott and Judith-Marie Bergan.

== Plot ==
A young man named Richard visits Beverly, a local prostitute, and runs into her boyfriend, a police officer named Ryan, on the way into Beverly's home. Richard and Beverly get into an argument, which ends with Richard accidentally shoving Beverly through a window, killing her. Richard cleans up the scene, evades Ryan when he returns from running errands, and hitchhikes to New York City after disposing of Beverly's body.

Richard acquires a room in a dingy motel, gets a job at a bottling company, befriends a neighboring drug dealer named Candice, and spies on Nancy, a prostitute who lives across from Candice. Intoxicated by what he felt during Beverly's death, Richard murders a woman named Lucy, torturing and humiliating her beforehand. Ryan, suspicious of Beverly's disappearance, heads to New York in search of her, enlisting the aid of the local police, and passing photographs of her around at clubs and bars. During the course of his investigation, Ryan spots Richard in a restaurant, and hears a broadcast announcing that Beverly's remains were uncovered. Concluding that Richard probably killed Beverly, Ryan finds out where he is staying, and heads there.

At the motel, Richard gets into a fight with Candice and kills her and her dog. Ryan finds Candice's corpse, and sees Richard at Nancy's through the window Richard broke when he threw the body of Candice's dog out it. Richard attacks Nancy, but she fights him off with the help of a straight razor, and a pair of pimps. Ryan happens upon the scene, grabs Richard, and throws him out a window to his death.

== Cast ==
- Ian Scott as Richard
- Judith-Marie Bergan as Beverly Stevens
- James Johnston as Officer John Ryan
- Lawrence Tierney as Malone
- Jerry McGee as Charlie
- Patrick Hines as Gus

== Reception ==
Critical Condition responded well to Bloodrage, comparing it to Henry: Portrait of a Serial Killer, and writing it "oozes the atmosphere of the sleazy 70's and is bound to upset even the steadiest of stomachs, not because it is overly bloody (it's not) but because of the matter-of-fact way that director Joseph Bigwood (actually Joseph Zito using a pseudonym) treats the material and characters. While the storyline is of the basic 'serial killer murders prostitutes' formula, the acting and situations seem so natural and unhampered by not having a big budget (this is an extremely low budget effort) that it makes the killings all the more horrendous" and "I doubt that you'll find a more disturbing foray into the mind of a mass murderer".

While Fantastic Movie Musings and Ramblings commended the film's interesting ideas and "disjointed narrative structure" that "occasionally forces you to figure out certain details on your own" it found that it was hampered by numerous filler scenes, and was not as disturbing as it aspired to be.
