= Abduction (1975 film) =

1975 film

- Theatrical release poster
- Directed by: Joseph Zito
- Written by: Kent E. Carroll
- Based on: Black Abductor (novel) by Harrison James
- Produced by: Kent E. Carroll
- Starring: Gregory Rozakis; David Pendleton; Judith-Marie Bergan; Dorothy Malone; Leif Erickson
- Cinematography: João Fernandes
- Edited by: James Macreading
- Music by: Ronald Frangipane; Al Steckler
- Production company: Blackpool Partnership
- Distributed by: Venture Distributors
- Release date: October 24, 1975
- Running time: 95 minutes
- Country: United States
- Language: English

Abduction is a 1975 American thriller film directed by Joseph Zito, produced and written by Kent E. Carroll and based on the novel Black Abductor by Harrison James, which has similarities to the Patty Hearst case which it predates. It stars Gregory Rozakis, David Pendleton and Judith-Marie Bergan and was first released in the U.S. on October 24, 1975.

== Premise ==
The daughter of a rich property developer is kidnapped and held hostage for ransom by a group of radicals. After being brutalised and brainwashed she eventually becomes converted to their cause.

== Violence ==
The movie is violent throughout though the details are largely kept out of shot. The kidnappers beat up Michael, Patricia's boyfriend, when they seize her. Frank tries and fails to rape her on camera and then Dory takes over. The scenes are sent to Patricia's father along with her reading out the kidnappers' demands. Alongside a second set of demands, Patricia is forced to make love with Carol on camera. The police violently interrogate Jake, a friend of Frank, to find out the identities and location of the gang members. In the final scenes, Patricia shoots the police who have broken in to rescue her, showing that she is now part of the group.

== Cast ==
=== Prescott family and friend ===
- Judith-Marie Bergan - Patricia Prescott
- Leif Erickson - Mr. Prescott
- Dorothy Malone - Mrs. Prescott
- Andrew Rohrer - Michael, Patricia's boyfriend

=== Kidnappers ===
- Gregory Rozakis - Frank
- David Pendleton - Dory
- Catherine Lacy - Carol
- Presley Caton - Angie

=== Also credited ===
- Lawrence Tierney - FBI Agent
- Andrew Bloch - Jake, who informed on the kidnappers under police interrogation

== Release ==
The film opened exclusively in New York for two weeks before expanding to Los Angeles and San Francisco.

== Reception ==
The New York Times described this as "bargain-basement movie-making of the least interesting sort, an ineptly produced ripoff of the Patricia Hearst story ... based on a novel that was actually written before the kidnapping". Steve Carlson, on the Letterboxd website, commented that this is "a plainly scummy little hostage feature that would barely rate a footnote in exploitation-film history if not for that it kicked off the career of Joseph Zito."

Hearst Newspapers refused to run advertisements for the film.

== See also ==
- List of American films of 1975
