= João Fernandes (cinematographer) =

Brazilian-born cinematographer

- Born: July 21, 1939 (age 87); Brazil
- Education: New York University
- Spouse: Judith-Marie Bergan (deceased)

João Fernandes is a Brazilian-born cinematographer best known for his work in the adult film industry during the Golden Age of Porn, before his shift toward more mainstream genre cinema.

== Life and career ==
Born in Brazil, Fernandes studied at New York University under Haig P. Manoogian and began work as a crewman on low-budget pornographic films. Throughout the 1970s, Fernandes shot many entries in the emerging "porno chic" subgenre, including the seminal Deep Throat and director Gerard Damiano's follow-up feature, The Devil in Miss Jones, a film which Roger Ebert described as being the "best entry" in the entire genre. In 1978, Fernandes made his first foray into mainstream filmmaking with Land of No Return, a wilderness adventure film directed by Kent Bateman and starring William Shatner. Fernandes subsequently shot Bloodrage, a low-budget exploitation film which reused numerous locations, cast, and crew from an earlier independent film never released. Fernandes subsequently became the go-to director of photographer for the film's director, Joseph Zito, shooting his follow-up picture The Prowler. The cult slasher film caught the attention of Frank Mancuso Jr., the producer of the Friday the 13th film franchise. Mancuso hired Zito direct the series' fourth entry, and Fernandes re-teamed with the director to shoot the film. Fernandes then shot numerous Chuck Norris action films produced by Cannon Films, including Missing in Action and Invasion U.S.A., also directed by Joseph Zito.

=== Directorial Work ===
Since working with Chuck Norris in Missing in Action and Invasion U.S.A., Fernandes had continued to work with Norris over the years, having not only been a cinematographer for several episodes of Walker, Texas Ranger, but also having directed three episodes of the show (those episodes were "A Father's Image", "Warriors" and "The Children of Halloween").
