= Jason Frost =

Jason Frost is an in-house pseudonym used by two authors, Raymond Obstfeld (born 1952) and Rich Rainey, who wrote the six-book series called The Warlord published by Zebra Mens Adventure, a division of Zebra Books that is ultimately a subsidiary of Kensington Publishing Corporation. The books were written and published from 1983 to 1987 .

== Bibliography ==
=== The Warlord series ===
Pulp fiction genre. After twin earthquakes have broken California off from the US mainland and surrounded it with an impenetrable radioactive zone, a large group of people are cut off from everyone else with no single unifying government. Through the travels of a thirty-something survivor, the books describe the sociological situation in the aftermath. Books #1-5 were written by Obstfeld while #6 was written by Rainey.

1. The Warlord (1983) ISBN 0-8217-1189-X
2. The Cutthroat (1984) ISBN 0-8217-1308-6
3. Badland (1984) ISBN 0-8217-1437-6
4. PrisonLand (1985) ISBN 0-8217-1506-2
5. Terminal Island (1985) ISBN 0-8217-1697-2
6. Killers Keep (1987) ISBN 0-8217-2214-X

=== Novels ===
- Invasion U.S.A. (1985) ISBN 0-5234-2669-0, novelization of film
