= Patrick Hines =

American actor (1930–1985)

Mainer Patrick Hines (March 17, 1930 in Burkeville, Texas – August 12, 1985 in Manhattan, New York) was an American actor who was probably best known for his portrayal of Kapellmeister Giuseppe Bonno in the 1984 film Amadeus. He also appeared as Samuel Chase in the film 1776. Other films include The Brink's Job, Bloodrage and A Passage to India.

== Stage ==
On Broadway Hines was a character actor; he made his debut as Friar Pete in the 1957 production of Measure for Measure in a cast which included Norman Lloyd and Ellis Rabb. In 1972, he appeared alongside the original cast of Pippin at the Kennedy Center tryout. He was originally supposed to play the Abbot in the cut monastery sequence. The entire scene, and by extension his role, was cut just before previews began and he left the show before it transferred to Broadway. He created the role of Orsini-Rosenberg in the original New York production of Amadeus and appeared with Rex Harrison in the 1979 revival of Shaw's Caesar and Cleopatra in the role of Pothinus. Other shows include roles in The Iceman Cometh, with Jason Robards Jr., and The Devils.

== Death ==
In 1985, Hines died of a heart attack at the age of 55.

== Filmography ==
| Year | Title | Role | Notes |
|---|---|---|---|
| 1972 | 1776 | Samuel Chase (MD) | |
| 1978 | The Brink's Job | H.H. Rightmire | |
| 1979 | Bloodrage | Gus | |
| 1984 | Amadeus | Kappelmeister Bonno | (final film role) |
