= Friday the 13th: The Final Chapter =

1984 film by Joseph Zito

- Theatrical release poster
- Directed by: Joseph Zito
- Screenplay by: Barney Cohen
- Story by: Bruce Hidemi Sakow
- Based on: Characters by: Victor Miller; Ron Kurz; Martin Kitrosser; Carol Watson
- Produced by: Frank Mancuso Jr.
- Starring: Kimberly Beck; Corey Feldman; Crispin Glover
- Cinematography: João Fernandes
- Edited by: Joel Goodman; Daniel Loewenthal
- Music by: Harry Manfredini
- Production companies: Paramount Pictures; Friday Four, Inc.
- Distributed by: Paramount Pictures
- Release date: April 13, 1984
- Running time: 91 minutes
- Country: United States
- Language: English
- Budget: $2.2 million
- Box office: $33 million

Friday the 13th: The Final Chapter is a 1984 American slasher film directed by Joseph Zito, produced by Frank Mancuso Jr., and starring Kimberly Beck, Corey Feldman, Crispin Glover, and Peter Barton. It is the sequel to Friday the 13th Part III (1982), and the fourth installment in the Friday the 13th franchise. Picking up immediately after the events of the previous film, the plot follows a presumed-dead Jason Voorhees (Ted White) who escapes from the morgue and returns to Crystal Lake to continue his killing spree. The film marks the debut of the character Tommy Jarvis (Feldman), who would make further appearances in two sequels and related media, establishing him as Jason's archenemy.

Much like Part III, the film was originally supposed to be the final installment. Mancuso Jr. wanted to conclude the series as he felt no one respected him for his producing work on it regardless of how much the films earned at the box office, while also wanting to pursue other projects. Paramount Pictures supported the decision, as they were aware of the declining popularity of slasher films at the time of its release. As a result, the film was billed as The Final Chapter to ensure it as such. Make-up artist Tom Savini, who worked on the first installment, returned because he wanted to help kill off Jason, whom he helped create.

The film was originally scheduled to be released in October but was pushed up to April 13, 1984. Upon its theatrical release, it grossed $33 million in the U.S. on a budget of $2.2 million, making it the fourth most attended of the Friday the 13th series with approximately 9,815,700 tickets sold. Though the film received negative reviews from critics at the time of release, it has retrospectively come to be considered one of the stronger entries in the series. Despite being billed as the final entry, its success prompted another sequel, Friday the 13th: A New Beginning, one year later, followed by a further six sequels, a reboot, and two television shows.

== Plot ==
Following the murders at Higgins Haven, (Note: As depicted in Friday the 13th Part III (1982)) police clean up the grounds and Jason Voorhees' body, believed to be dead, is taken to the morgue. The hockey masked killer spontaneously revives and escapes from the cold storage at the hospital, murdering the coroner Axel Burns with a hacksaw and gutting Nurse Robbie Morgan with a scalpel. The following day, a group of teenagers drive to Crystal Lake for a summer trip. The group comprises Paul, his girlfriend Samantha, virgin Sara, her boyfriend Doug, awkward Jimmy, and jokester Ted. On the way, the group comes across Pamela Voorhees' (Note: As depicted in Friday the 13th (1980)) tombstone and a hitchhiker, whom Jason soon kills.

Next door to the teens' rental house is the Jarvis family, consisting of Trish, her twelve-year-old brother Tommy, their mother and the family dog Gordon. While going for a walk the next day, the teens meet twin sisters Tina and Terri and go skinny dipping with them. Trish and Tommy happen upon the scene, and Trish is invited to a party taking place that night. Afterward, when their car breaks down, Trish and Tommy are helped out by a young man named Rob Dier. They take him to their house, where Tommy shows him several monster masks he made before Rob leaves to go camping.

Later that night, the teens begin the party. A jealous Sam sees Tina flirting with Paul and leaves. She goes out to the lake, where Jason impales her from under a raft. When Paul goes out to look for her, he is harpooned in the crotch. Terri decides to leave the party early, but Jason stabs her with a spear before she can get on her bike. Next door, Mrs. Jarvis arrives home and discovers the power is out. While searching for her children and Gordon, she is killed offscreen. Trish and Tommy soon arrive and realize their mother is missing. Trish goes to search for her and finds Rob's campsite. He explains to her that he is the brother of Sandra Dier, a teenager who was recently murdered by Jason, (Note: As depicted in Friday the 13th Part 2 (1981)) and reveals that Jason is still alive and that he came to Crystal Lake to avenge his sister's death. Worried about Tommy's safety, Trish and Rob return to the house.

After sleeping with Tina, Jimmy goes downstairs to get a bottle of wine only for Jason to pin his hand down with a corkscrew and strike his face with a cleaver. Upstairs, Tina looks out a window and finds that Terri's bike is still there. Jason then bursts through the window and throws her to her death, crashing onto the car. While a stoned Ted watches stag films with a film projector, he gets too close to the projector screen and is stabbed in the head with a kitchen knife from the other side. Jason then goes upstairs, where Doug and Sara finish making love in the shower. After Sara leaves, Jason kills Doug by crushing his head against the shower tile. When Sara screams upon finding Doug's body, she tries to escape but gets a double-bit axe through her chest.

Trish, Rob, and Gordon go next door to investigate and discover the teens' bodies. Gordon flees, and Jason kills Rob in the basement as Trish runs home, taking Rob's machete. She and Tommy barricade the house, but Jason breaks in and chases them into Tommy's room. Trish lures Jason out of the house, escapes, then returns home and is devastated to learn that Tommy did not run away. She senses Jason behind her and tries to fight him off with the machete but is overpowered. Having disguised himself to look like Jason as a child, Tommy distracts him long enough for Trish to hit him with the machete, but she merely whacks off his mask. As Trish stands horrified at Jason's deformed face, Tommy takes the machete and strikes it in the side of his skull, causing him to collapse to the floor and split his head upon impact. When Tommy notices that Jason's fingers are slightly moving, he continues to hack at his body, yelling, "Die! Die! Die!" while Trish repeatedly yells out his name.

At the hospital, Tommy visits Trish. Disturbed, he rushes in and embraces her. His eyes are closed as they embrace, but he then opens them, staring ominously on.

== Cast ==
- Kimberly Beck as Trish Jarvis
- Peter Barton as Doug Bell
- Corey Feldman as Tommy Jarvis
- E. Erich Anderson as Rob Dier
- Crispin Glover as Jimmy Mortimer
- Alan Hayes as Paul Guthrie
- Barbara Howard as Sara Parkington
- Lawrence Monoson as Ted Cooper
- Joan Freeman as Tracy Jarvis
- Judie Aronson as Samantha Lane
- Camilla More as Tina Moore
- Carey More as Terri Moore
- Lisa Freeman as Nurse Robbie Morgan
- Wayne Grace as Officer Jamison
- Bonnie Hellman as Hitchhiker
- Frankie Hill as Lainie
- Paul Lukather as Doctor
- Bruce Mahler as Axel Burns
- Antony Ponzini as Vincent
- Ted White as Jason Voorhees (uncredited)

== Production ==
When Friday the 13th Part III was released, it was initially supposed to end the series as a trilogy, but there was no moniker to indicate it as such. In 1983, there were rumors that Paramount Pictures billed the fourth film as The Final Chapter as a result of them feeling embarrassed by their association with the series. Despite how Roger Ebert and Gene Siskel claimed this in their review of the film on At the Movies, Paramount Pictures was aware that the slasher genre had been declining in interest. However, the idea came from producer Frank Mancuso Jr. (the son of Paramount CEO Frank Mancuso Sr.) as he began to resent the series due to how he felt nobody respected him for working on Friday the 13th Part 2 as a production assistant and Part III as producer, regardless of how much money the films earned. As a result of this and him wanting to work on different projects, he wanted to conclude the series by killing off Jason Voorhees.

=== Writing ===
The filmmakers wanted Joseph Zito, who had previously produced and directed The Prowler, to direct and write the screenplay for the film. He initially claimed that he wasn't a writer, but he later accepted it when the contract offered him payment for directing and writing. Zito secretly used the extra salary to hire Barney Cohen to write the script. Their process entailed Zito taking one-hour phone calls every night with Phil Scuderi to discuss the film's screenplay and story. He then met Cohen in a New York apartment to use the ideas Scuderi had offered, which then they would turn into script pages sent that day to Scuderi in Boston to be discussed again over the phone. Cohen remained credited for writing the film, but he eventually got into trouble with the Writers Guild of America as a result.

Previous Friday the 13th films generally favored young women being the final girl. This is the first film in the series to not only have two survivors instead of one, but one of them being a child. The filmmakers believed this aspect has never been done before in a slasher film, as well as them wanting to create characters that the audience don't want to see harmed or killed. By including the Jarvis family, composed of a divorced mother Tracy (Joan Freeman), teenage daughter Trish (Kimberly Beck), and pre-teen son Tommy (Corey Feldman) opposite the usual cast of teenagers, they could generate more drama and resonant tragedy such the implication of Mrs. Jarvis killed outside by Jason, and thus remaining debatable how intentional the parallels are between Jason and Tommy. Tommy's interest in make-up effects served as an homage to Tom Savini.

=== Casting ===
Camilla More initially auditioned for Samantha, but when the filmmakers discovered she had a twin sister Carey they were instead offered the roles of Tina and Terri Moore. Amy Steel, who starred as heroine Ginny Field in Friday the 13th Part 2, co-starred with Peter Barton on the TV series The Powers of Matthew Star. Barton was offered the role of Doug Bell when the series was cancelled, but he was initially reluctant as he wanted no part in any horror film, especially after he disliked working on Hell Night. However, because Steel was involved in Part 2, she talked him into doing the film. Make-up artist Tom Savini, who had not returned for Part 2 and Part III, was invited by Zito to work on the film to help kill off Jason, who he helped create in the original film.

=== Filming ===
Filming commenced in October 1983 to January 1984 in Topanga Canyon and Newhall, California. It was originally set to be released in October 1984, but Frank Mancuso Sr. pushed the release date to April 13, leaving them only 6 weeks to complete post-production. The only time Paramount helped with the film's production, they rented a house in Malibu for the filmmakers to stay and conduct editing sessions, with food brought to them by the studio.

The film had a troubled production on set. As a result of the director's poor treatment and the film's budget, many of the actors had to perform uncomfortable or dangerous stunts for the movie. Judie Aronson was required to remain submerged in a highly freezing lake, in which she later developed hypothermia because of it, and Peter Barton was genuinely slammed against the shower wall when Jason attacks him. Ted White, who portrays Jason Voorhees, defended several of the actors by requesting Barton to have a crash pad, and threatening to quit when Zito refused to remove Aronson from the cold lake in-between takes. White and Zito maintained a hostile relationship on set, resulting in White demanding his name to be removed from the credits. According to White, Corey Feldman maintained a bratty attitude on set as a result from Zito's treatment. When filming the scene of Tommy hacking at Jason's body, which were two sandbags he was striking at, Feldman pretended the sandbags were Zito.

Actress Kimberly Beck stated that she does not like the slasher film genre, saying she felt that the film was more of a C-movie rather than a B-movie. During filming, Beck experienced strange encounters, including a man watching her while she ran in the park and receiving odd phone calls at all hours. This stopped when production was finished.

Actress Bonnie Hellman's agents told her she would not want to take the role of the hitchhiker in the film as there were no lines for the character, but she accepted the role anyway.

An alternative ending exists where the character of Trish discovers the body of Mrs. Jarvis in the bathtub. This exists as a DVD extra but the original audio for the scene is lost.

== Music ==
Friday the 13th: The Final Chapter

Soundtrack album by Harry Manfredini
- Released: January 13, 2012 (La-La Land)
- Recorded: 1984
- Genre: Film score
- Length: 52:14
- Labels: Gramavision, La-La Land

The film's music was composed by Harry Manfredini, who composed the scores to all of the series' previous installments. On January 13, 2012, La-La Land Records released a limited edition 6-CD boxset containing Manfredini's scores from the first six entries of the film series. The release was sold out in less than 24 hours of availability. The song "Love Is a Lie" by Lion is featured in the film, but not on the soundtrack.

== Release ==
Friday the 13th: The Final Chapter opened in the United States and Canada on Friday, April 13, 1984, on 1,594 screens.

=== Home media ===
Paramount Home Entertainment released Friday the 13th: The Final Chapter on VHS in 1984 and Betamax in 1985.

The film has been reissued on DVD in multiple versions, first in 1999. Paramount released a deluxe edition DVD on June 16, 2009.

A Blu-ray edition was released by Paramount on October 10, 2017, The film was re-released on Blu-ray as part of the Friday The 13th Collection box set by Scream Factory on October 13, 2020, which went out of print in 2025. Paramount later reissued a limited edition standalone Blu-ray in steelbook packaging on January 10, 2023.

== Reception ==
=== Box office ===
Friday the 13th: The Final Chapter grossed $11.1 million during its opening weekend, ranking number one at the box office. The film would ultimately take in $33 million at the U.S. box office, with approximately 9,815,700 tickets sold, placing number 26 on the list of the year's top-grossing films.

=== Critical response ===
On the review aggregator website Rotten Tomatoes, 19% of 80 critics' reviews are positive, with an average rating of 3.6/10. The website's consensus reads: "A comparatively polished yet creatively exhausted Friday the 13th entry, The Final Chapter fails to overcome deadened thrills and a dispiriting lack of imagination even in its gruesome kills." Metacritic, which uses a weighted average, assigned the film a score of 33 out of 100, based on 7 critics, indicating "generally unfavorable" reviews.

Roger Ebert and Gene Siskel berated the film on their television show Sneak Previews, with the former deeming it "an immoral and reprehensible piece of trash." Scott Meslow of The Week summarized Ebert's criticism by calling it a "cynical retread" from the earlier films, arguing that the film attempted to kill off the series while focusing more on characterization than gore. In a series retrospective, Kyle Anderson of Entertainment Weekly ranked it the best Friday the 13th film, complimenting both its narrative and its kills.

== Sources ==
- Bracke, Peter (2006). Crystal Lake Memories: The Complete History of Friday The 13th (First ed.). Los Angeles, California: Titan Books. ISBN 978-1-845-76343-5.
