= Ted White (stuntman) =

American stuntman and actor (1926–2022)

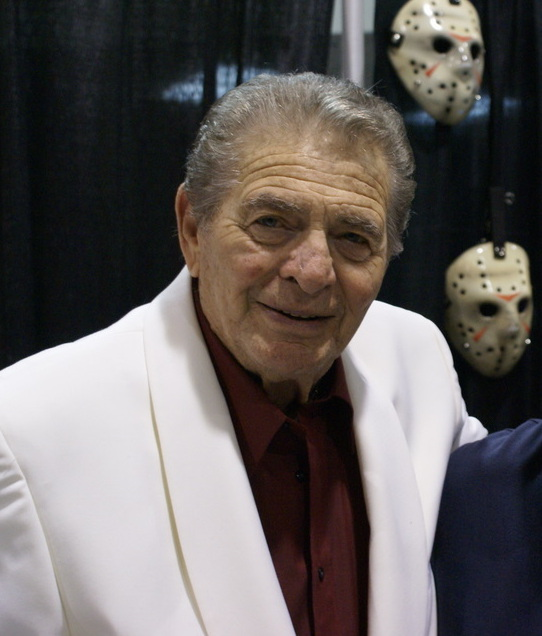
- White at a horror Convention in 2012
- Born: Alex Bayouth; January 25, 1926; Krebs, Oklahoma, U.S.
- Died: October 14, 2022 (aged 96); Los Angeles California, U.S.
- Occupations: Actor, stuntman
- Years active: 1949–2022

Alex Ted Bayouth (January 25, 1926 – October 14, 2022), known professionally as Ted White, was an American stuntman and actor who was best known for playing Jason Voorhees in Friday the 13th: The Final Chapter. He was also notable for having doubled for John Wayne, Fess Parker, Clark Gable, and Richard Boone.

== Life and career ==
Born as Alex Bayouth in Krebs, Oklahoma, White grew up in Snyder, Texas. He played football for the University of Oklahoma, then pursued a stuntman/acting career. In Sands of Iwo Jima (1949), White was approached because of his Marine Corps background when they needed a consultant for the layout of the island. That was when White met John Wayne and began doubling for him in 1952.

White had minor roles in several western films and in such television series as Daniel Boone; The Andy Griffith Show; Hunter; Magnum, P.I.; and The Rockford Files, usually in tough-guy roles such as police officers or hired thugs. He has also worked in Gone in 60 Seconds, Silverado, Major League, Starman, and Tron.

In 1984, White played hockey masked murderer Jason Voorhees in Friday the 13th: The Final Chapter, after the director needed a large man for the part. White reluctantly accepted because he needed the money. White asked not to be credited on screen for his part, partly because he did not appreciate how the young actors and actresses had been treated during production. He was later credited for the archive footage of him as Jason that was used in the seventh Friday film. White was offered the role of Jason for Friday the 13th: A New Beginning and Friday the 13th Part VI: Jason Lives, but turned them down. The roles ultimately went to stuntmen Tom Morga and C. J. Graham, respectively.

White died at his home on October 14, 2022, at the age of 96.

== Partial filmography ==
=== Actor ===
Year	Film	Role	Notes
1949	Sands of Iwo Jima	Marine	Uncredited
1958	The Perfect Furlough	Soldier	Uncredited
1958	Born Reckless	Cowboy	Uncredited
1960	The Alamo	Tennessean	Uncredited
1965	Cat Ballou	Gunslinger	Uncredited
1967	Point Blank	Football player	Uncredited
1974	Dirty Mary Crazy Larry	Trooper	
1980	Going Ape!	Goon 1	
1980	Oh, God! Book II	Motorcycle Policeman	
1980	Used Cars	Police Deputy	
1982	Tron	Guard	
1984	Starman	Deer Hunter	
1984	Romancing the Stone	Grogan	
1984	Friday the 13th: The Final Chapter	Jason Voorhees	Uncredited
1984	Against All Odds	Security guard with dog	
1984	The Wild Life	Redneck Drunk #2	
1985	Silverado	Hoyt	
1986	Quiet Cool	Ellis	
1987	Hot Pursuit	Tommy Ray	
1987	The Hidden	Agent Fowler	
1988	Friday the 13th Part VII: The New Blood	Jason Voorhees	Archive footage
1990	Downtown	Goon	
2001	Double Take	Trooper	
2009	His Name Was Jason: 30 Years of Friday the 13th	Himself	Documentary film
2013	Crystal Lake Memories: The Complete History of Friday the 13th	Himself	Documentary film
2018	To Hell and Back: The Kane Hodder Story	Himself	Documentary film

=== Stuntman ===
Year	Film	Notes
1955	Revenge of the Creature	Gill man stunt double Uncredited
1962	Hatari!	John Wayne's stunt double Uncredited
1968	Planet of the Apes	Uncredited
1972	Prime Cut	Uncredited
1973	Soylent Green	
1979	1941	Uncredited
1980	Bronco Billy	Uncredited
1981	Escape from New York	
1984	Cloak & Dagger	
1986	Short Circuit	
1989	Major League	
1989	Road House	
1999	Wild Wild West	
2000	Gone in 60 Seconds	
