= Joseph Zito =

American film director

- Born: New York City, U.S.
- Occupations: Film director, Producer

Joseph Zito is an American film director and producer, best known for directing several cult and genre films throughout the 1980s, such as Missing in Action, Invasion U.S.A., Red Scorpion, The Prowler, and Friday the 13th: The Final Chapter. In 1985–1986, Zito spent a year of pre-production on the Cannon Films version of Spider-Man which eventually fell through. Zito left the production due to budgetary constraints.

== Filmography ==
=== Film ===
Year	Title	Director	Producer	Notes
1975	Abduction	Yes		
1979	Bloodrage	Yes	Yes	
1981	The Prowler	Yes	Yes	
1984	Friday the 13th: The Final Chapter	Yes		
1984	Missing in Action	Yes		
1985	Invasion U.S.A.	Yes		
1988	Red Scorpion	Yes		Uncredited rewrite
2000	Delta Force One: The Lost Patrol	Yes	Executive	
2003	Power Play	Yes		
2013	Crystal Lake Memories: The Complete History of Friday the 13th			Himself, documentary film

=== Television ===
Year	Title	Director	Producer	Notes
2007–2013	Critical Moments		Yes	97 episodes
2009	His Name Was Jason: 30 Years of Friday the 13th			Himself, documentary film
2017	Medinah		Yes	6 episodes

=== Other ===
Year	Title	Director	Producer	Notes
2015	Media Wars		Yes	Video Game
