= Nick Mancuso =

Canadian actor (born 1948)

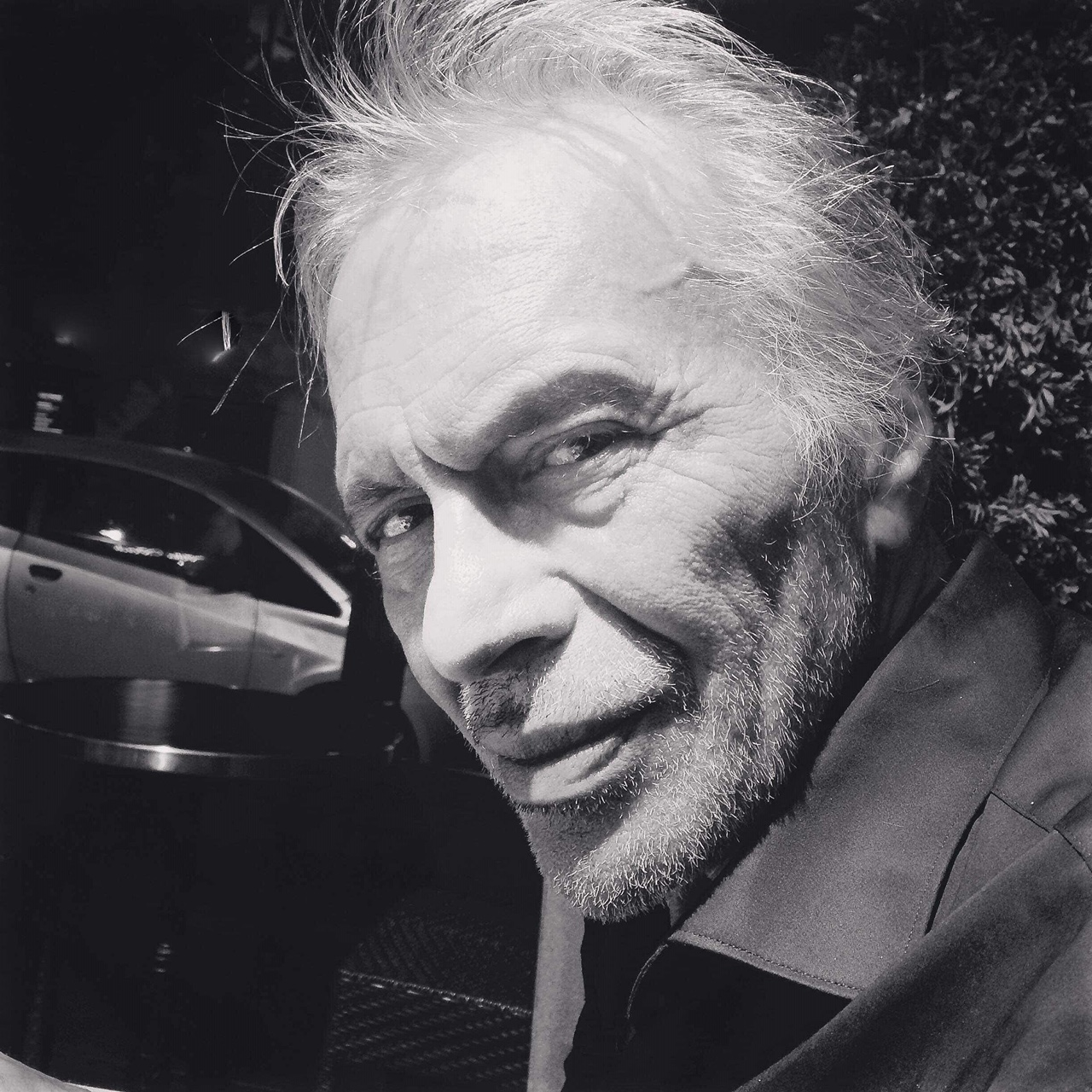
- Mancuso in 2018 in Paris
- Born: Nicodemo Antonio Massimo Mancuso; May 29, 1948 (age 78); Mammola, Calabria, Italy
- Occupations: Actor, director, artist, playwright, poet
- Spouse(s): Lady Patricia Pelham-Clinton-Hope (m. 1981; div. 1983) Barbara Williams (m. 1987; div. 1993) Nadia Capone (m. 1998)
- Children: 1

Nicodemo Antonio Massimo Mancuso (born May 29, 1948) is an Italian-Canadian actor, artist, playwright, and director. Beginning his career as a stage actor, he had his breakthrough role in the 1981 drama Ticket to Heaven, for which he won the Genie Award for Best Performance by a Leading Actor. He has over 155 film and television credits, including voicing Billy in the slasher film Black Christmas (1974), acting as Eli in the film Heartbreakers (1984), starring as Ray on the NBC series Stingray (1985–1987), playing antichrist Franco Macalousso in the Apocalypse film series (1998–2001) and CIA Director Tom Breaker in Under Siege 2: Dark Territory.

== Early life and education ==
Mancuso was born May 29, 1948, in Mammola, Calabria, Italy. His family emigrated to Canada in 1956 via Naples, when he was eight years old. He grew up in Ontario and began acting in high school. On graduation, he studied psychology at the University of Toronto, but left to pursue acting full time.

== Career ==
Mancuso began his professional career by performing in theatres across Canada such as the Vancouver Playhouse, Neptune Theatre, Centaur Theatre and Halifax's Pier One experimental theatre, where he was also an associate artistic director for one season. He went on to perform in various independent theatre companies including the Toronto Free Theatre, Canadian Stage Company, Factory Theatre, and the Theatre Passe Muraille. He had his first voice screen role debut with an uncredited role in the 1974 slasher film Black Christmas, as the voice of the stalking murderer Billy. He spent a season in 1976 at the Stratford Festival, with leading roles in The Merchant of Venice, Antony and Cleopatra, and A Midsummer Night's Dream, and landed his first screen appearance in a supporting role in Allan Eastman's debut film, A Sweeter Song.

In 1979, he made his American stage debut working directly with Tennessee Williams, starring in Tiger Tail and The Night of the Iguana in Atlanta. During this time, he came to the attention of producers at Columbia Pictures. Martin Ransohoff and Arthur Hiller were instrumental in getting Mancuso for the lead in the horror-thriller Nightwing, directed by Hiller and co-starring David Warner. Ransohoff and Hiller hoped Nightwing would be a hit and be a breakthrough role for Mancuso, but it failed at the box office.

In the early 1980s, Mancuso had his breakthrough role in Ticket to Heaven in which he played the part of a David Kappel, a non-observant Jewish teacher in Toronto. His girlfriend leaves him and he visits San Francisco to find his footing and see an old friend. He is lured into spending a weekend at a camp that is actually the recruiting and indoctrination center for a religious cult. The film was voted one of the top 10 films of 1981 by the National Board of Review, and earned Mancuso the Genie Award for Best Performance by an Actor in a Leading Role. The success of the film and Mancuso's performance put him in the running to play Indiana Jones in Raiders of the Lost Ark.

Mancuso played the titular role on the NBC series Stingray, which ran two seasons between 1985 and 1987. He played the antichrist Franco Macalousso in Apocalypse, a series of direct-to-video films produced by Cloud Ten Pictures. Among the other roles Mancuso has taken on there was the role of Holden Downes in Captured. In this sometime violent film, he plays a real estate tycoon on the edge. He comes across some thieves who are out to rob him and takes his anger out on them. Instead, he turns the tables on them, making them the victims. He has also appeared in numerous independent and short films.

== Personal life ==
In 1981, Mancuso married Lady Patricia Pelham-Clinton-Hope (born 1949), a daughter of Henry Pelham-Clinton-Hope, 9th Duke of Newcastle; they divorced in 1983. He later married his second wife, Canadian actress Barbara Williams, before divorcing. In 1998, he married his third wife Toronto-born actress Nadia Capone. The two have one child together.

As of July 2019, Mancuso resides in Toronto, and was running a six-week acting workshop there. He has also published a book of poetry in 2006 titled Mediterranean Man and created a number of abstract paintings. He is fluent in English and Italian, and speaks conversational French.

He underwent quadruple bypass surgery in 2011. A longtime vegetarian and proponent of homeopathy, Mancuso joined a class-action lawsuit against the government of Canada in 2012 over its ban of previously available herbs and vitamins that were offered by naturopaths and health food suppliers.

== Filmography ==
- 1974 Red Emma (TV)
- 1974 Black Christmas as Billy, The Prowler / Phone Voice
- 1976 A Sweeter Song as Manuel
- 1978 Dr. Scorpion (TV) as John Shackelford
- 1979 The House on Garibaldi Street (TV) as Ari
- 1979 Nightwing as Youngman Duran
- 1980 as Scrupules (Scruples) (TV series) as Vito Orsini
- 1980 Le Bateau de la mort (Death Ship) as Nick
- 1981 Ticket to Heaven as David
- 1982 The Legend of Walks Far Woman (TV) as Horses Ghost
- 1982 Mother Lode as Jean Dupre
- 1983 Feel the Heat (TV series) as Andy Thorn
- 1983 Maria Chapdelaine as François Paradis
- 1983 Desperate Intruder (TV) as Mike
- 1983 Tell Me That You Love Me as Dan
- 1984 Heartbreakers as Eli
- 1984 Blame It on the Night as Chris Dalton
- 1984 Paroles et Musique as Peter
- 1985 Death of an Angel as Father Angel
- 1985 The Ray Bradbury Theater, S1E3 ("The Crowd") as Spallner
- 1985-1987 Stingray (TV series) as Ray
- 1985 Embassy (TV) as Harry Brackett
- 1985 Night Magic as Michael
- 1986 Half a Lifetime (TV) as Toby
- 1987 The King of Love (TV)
- 1990 Last Train Home (TV) as Sam Steele
- 1990 Frontière du crime (Double Identity) (TV) as Paul Flemming
- 1990 Liaison brûlante (Burning Bridges) (TV) as Peter Hollinger
- 1991 Lena's Holiday as Flynn
- 1991 Milena as Jaromir
- 1991 Fatal Exposure (TV) as Carl Stone
- 1991 Lies Before Kisses (TV) as Sonny
- 1991 Vendetta: Secrets of a Mafia Bride (TV) as Danny LaManna
- 1992 Rapid Fire as Antonio Serrano
- 1992 Somebody's Daughter (TV) as Noah Canaan
- 1992 Under Siege as CIA Director Tom Breaker
- 1993 Matrix (TV series) as Steven Matrix
- 1993 Wild Palms (Wild Palms) (TV series) as Tully Woiwode
- 1993 Message from Nam (TV) as Captain Bill Quinn
- 1994 Vitrine sur meurtre (Flinch) as Miles Raymond
- 1994 For the Love of Aaron (TV) as Stuart Singer
- 1994 Suspicious Agenda as Jimmy Davane
- 1995 The Takeover as Anthony Vilachi
- 1995 Young Ivanhoe (TV) as De Bourget
- 1995 Arbalète et rock'n roll (A Young Connecticut Yankee in King Arthur's Court) as King Arthur
- 1995 Under Siege 2: Dark Territory as CIA Director Tom Breaker
- 1996 The Outer Limits (1995 TV series) as Martin, Season 2 Episode 2 "Resurrection"
- 1996 Twists of Terror (TV) as Crenshaw
- 1996 Sealed With a Kiss (TV) as Barry Kuda
- 1996 Marquis de Sade as Marquis de Sade
- 1996 Les Amants de rivière rouge (TV series) as O'Connor
- 1996 Once You Meet a Stranger (TV)
- 1996 Past Perfect
- 1996 Vows of Deception (TV) as Matt Harding
- 1997 Against the Law as Detective John Shepard
- 1997 Question de confiance (Matter of Trust) as Peter Marsh
- 1997 Piégée (Laws of Deception) as Sergeant Lou Mather
- 1997 The Ex as David Kenyon
- 1997 The Invader as Willard
- 1997 Let Me Call You Sweetheart (TV)
- 1998 Harlequin's Loving Evangeline as Robert Cannon
- 1998 Loyal Opposition: Terror in the White House (TV) as General Metzger
- 1998 Provocateur as Toynbey Bates
- 1998 Misbegotten as Paul Bourke
- 1998 Past Perfect as Stone
- 1998 Captured (vidéo) as Holden Downs
- 1998 Programmés pour tuer (Perfect Assassins) (TV) as Samuel Greely
- 1999 Revelation as Franco Macalousso
- 1999 Total Recall 2070 (TV) as Richard Collector
- 1999 Question of Privilege as Steven Healy
- 1999 Jack of Hearts as Roy Murcant
- 2000 Tribulation as Franco Macalousso
- 2000 Call of the Wild as John Thornton
- 2001 The Outer Limits (1995 TV Series) as Father, Season 6 Episode 3 "A New Life"
- 2001 Judgment as Franco Macalousso
- 2001 La Mort en blanc (Avalanche Alley) (TV) as Scott
- 2001 The Secret Pact as Dominic Patton
- 2002 Time of Fear as Jack Barone
- 2002 Dancing at the Harvest Moon (TV)
- 2003 Firefight as George
- 2003 Lightning: Bolts of Destruction (TV) as General Fields
- 2004 Brave New Girl (TV) as Ditz's Father
- 2004 The Messiah: Prophecy Fulfilled as Yehudah
- 2004 Lives of the Saints (TV) as Mario Innocente
- 2005 Dreaming on Christmas as Sid
- 2005 Today You Die as FBI Agent Saunders
- 2005 Betting On Love (TV) as Arnie Tannenbaum
- 2005 In the Mix as Salvatore
- 2006 Night of Terror (TV) as Richard Grant
- 2007 Vanessa as Mr. Bennet
- 2008 The Wrong Mr. Johnson as Jim Johnson
- 2008 Contract Killers as Witkoff
- 2009 Deadtime Stories 2 as Swan
- 2009 Rise of the Gargoyles as Father Gable
- 2009 ZOS: Zone of Separation as Dragan Michailov
- 2009 Death Warrior as Ivan
- 2009 Lost Soul as Dr. Charles Crowther
- 2009 Napoleonic as Adam Trufant
- 2009 Violent Blue as Pietro
- 2009 The Last Gamble as Nick
- 2009 Bruco as Mario, Dead Father
- 2009 L'urlo di Chen terrorizza ancora l'occidente - Dragonland
- 2010 Napoleonic (short) as Adam Trufant
- 2013 Real Gangsters as Vincent "Jimmie" Lo Giacamo, also producer
- 2014 The Big Fat Stone as Mickey Goldstein
- 2016 Born Dead
- 2017 Adam's Testament as The Stranger
- 2017 Misfortune as Roman
- 2018 Road to the Lemon Grove as Guido

== Awards ==
- Genie Award for Best Performance by an Actor in a Leading Role, 1982, for role in film Ticket to Heaven
- Best Actor, Houston Film Festival, 1982, for role in film Ticket to Heaven
- Best Actor, Taormina Film Festival, 1982, for role in film Ticket to Heaven
- Best Actor, Academy of Family Films and Family Television, for role in film Ticket to Heaven
- Best Actor, Houston Film Festival, 1986, for role in film Heartbreakers
- Lifetime Achievement Award, Toronto Italian Film Festival, June 2005
