= Apocalypse (film series) =

- Directed by: Peter Gerretson; Andre Van Heerden
- Produced by: Peter Lalonde; Paul Lalonde
- Starring: Leigh Lewis; Nick Mancuso
- Distributed by: Cloud Ten Pictures
- Running time: 391 minutes
- Countries: Canada; United States
- Language: English

Apocalypse is an eschatological film franchise written and produced by brothers Peter and Paul LaLonde, the makers of the similar Left Behind series. Like the latter, the films were produced and released by Cloud Ten Pictures.

It focuses on the events that take place during the Great Tribulation period after the Biblical Rapture. Although there are four films in the series, the only end-time events that are depicted in them are the Rapture, the War of Ezekiel 38-39, and the Mark of the Beast.

The series' primarily follows characters Helen Hannah (Leigh Lewis), a reporter who becomes an Evangelical Christian following the rapture, and Franco Macalousso (played by Sam Bornstein in the first film, and Nick Mancuso in the following three films), the Biblical Anti-christ that claims to be the messiah and is the chancellor of the O.N.E. (One Nation Earth).

Other cast members include Jeff Fahey, Gary Busey, Carol Alt, Tony Nappo, Howie Mandel, Margot Kidder, Corbin Bernsen, and Mr. T. The films were released direct-to-video between 1998 and 2001. There are four entries, not including a planned but ultimately cancelled fifth film. The films have generally received mixed-to-negative critical reception.

== Films ==
=== Apocalypse ===
The first film in the series, also known as Apocalypse: Caught in the Eye of the Storm, was released in 1998. Skeptic Bronson Pearl (Richard Nester) and Christian Helen Hannah (Leigh Lewis) are award-winning journalists caught in a frantic race against time to alert the world of the deadly deception of Franco Macalousso (Sam Bornstein), President of the European Union, and soon to be recognized by some as the antichrist.

The film had a budget of $300,000 (equivalent to $539,540 in 2025) and sold 300,000 copies in the United States.

=== Apocalypse II: Revelation ===
Three months have passed since the events of the previous film. The leader of the world Franco Macalousso (Nick Mancuso) has convinced many of those left behind that he is the true Messiah. Counter-terrorism expert Thorold Stone (Jeff Fahey) tries to put the pieces of his life together, while his wife and daughter are among those who vanished. In the course of his investigation of an underground resistance movement, he discovers a conspiracy that leads to the discovery of a new global order. With the help from a group of underground Christians, led by Helen Hannah, a computer geek (Tony Nappo), and a blind skeptic (Carol Alt), Stone finds himself in a race against time.

=== Apocalypse III: Tribulation ===
The first half of the film is set before the events of Apocalypse, and the second half two years after the previous film Revelation.

Tom Canboro (Gary Busey) is a police detective who finds himself battling a mysterious group with psychic powers. When his wife (Sherry Miller), sister Eileen (Margot Kidder), and brother-in-law (Howie Mandel) become the target of this dark society, he rushes to their aid. However, before he can reach them, a mystical force takes control of his car, and he crashes into an oncoming truck.

When he wakes up from his coma, confused, he barely escapes from the hospital. He looks for his family, and tries to find out what is going on in what appears to be a transformed society. All Christians have vanished in the rapture, and 95% of the world worships the Antichrist Franco Macalousso and wears a 666 mark on their right hand and/or forehead; those that refused to take the mark are beheaded by Macalousso. Meanwhile, Helen Hannah and her resistance group try to expose Macalousso as the beast himself.

=== Apocalypse IV: Judgment ===
Supreme leader of One Nation Earth Franco Macalousso rules the world with an iron fist. His long-time nemesis Helen Hannah has been charged with crimes against humanity by the World Court, and Mitch Kendrick (Corbin Bernsen) is the troubled, reluctant lawyer assigned to defend her.

Prosecutor Victoria Thorne (Jessica Steen) is not only Kendrick's ex-lover but a high-powered attorney with a ruthless ambition to condemn all Haters; she has arranged that the verdict will convict Hannah. Meanwhile, hater J.T. Quincy (Mr. T) and his allies come up with a plan to rescue Hannah.

== Cast and characters ==
| Character | Film | | | |
| Character | Apocalypse | Apocalypse II: Revelation | Apocalypse III: Tribulation | Apocalypse IV: Judgment |
| Character | 1998 | 1999 | 2000 | 2001 |
|---|---|---|---|---|
| Helen Hannah | Leigh Lewis | Leigh Lewis | Leigh Lewis | Leigh Lewis |
| Franco Macalousso | Sam Bornstein | Nick Mancuso | Nick Mancuso | Nick Mancuso |
| Len Parker | David Roddis | David Roddis | | |
| Bronson Pearl | Richard Nester | | | |
| Jake Goss | | Patrick Gallagher | Patrick Gallagher | Patrick Gallagher |
| Willie Spino | | Tony Nappo | | Tony Nappo |
| Thorold Stone | | Jeff Fahey | | |
| Tom Canboro | | | Gary Busey | |
| Jason Quincy | | | Howie Mandel | |
| Mitch Kendrick | | | | Corbin Bernsen |
| Victoria Thorne | | | | Jessica Steen |
| Sinister Man | | | | Mif |

== Works cited ==
- Melnyk, George (2004). One Hundred Years of Canadian Cinema. University of Toronto Press. ISBN 080203568X.
