= Subterfuge (1996 film) =

1996 American action film

- Directed by: Herb Freed
- Written by: Marion Segal
- Produced by: Herb Freed; David Frost; Marion Segal (co.)
- Starring: Matt McColm; Richard Brake; Jason Gould; Amanda Pays
- Cinematography: Irek Hartowicz
- Edited by: Marion Segal
- Music by: Jim Halfpenny
- Production companies: Storm Entertainment; Bellrock Entertainment
- Distributed by: Avalanche Home Entertainment
- Release date: February 23, 1996; (United States)
- Running time: 95 minutes
- Country: United States
- Language: English

Subterfuge is a 1996 American action film written and co-produced by Marion Segal, and directed by Herb Freed. It stars Matt McColm as Jonathan Slade, an ex-military man who is given the task to retrieve the black box from a jetliner that crashed into the Black Sea. Supporting cast includes Richard Brake, Jason Gould, and Amanda Pays.

== Plot ==
A jetliner is shot down and crashes into the Black Sea, at the Russian territory. This is the beginning of an espionage conspiracy involving CIA and KGB agents. Jonathan Slade, an ex-military man who served in the Marines and champion swimmer, is given a mission to retrieve the black box from the damaged airliner. His brother, a computer genius, and a female special agent are supposed to help him complete the task.

== Cast ==
External image
- Matt McColm as Subterfuge's lead hero Jonathan Slade.

- Matt McColm as Jonathan Slade
- Richard Brake as Pierce Tencil
- Jason Gould as Alfred "Alfie" Slade
- Amanda Pays as Alexandra "Alex" Balin
- Glynn Turman as Stallworth Hubbs
- Ben Hammer as Vladimir Tiomkin
- Adam Gregor as Colonel Yuri Svetlanov
- Tony Abatemarco as Salazar
- Janice Lynde as newscaster
- Krikor Satamian as cab driver

== Production ==
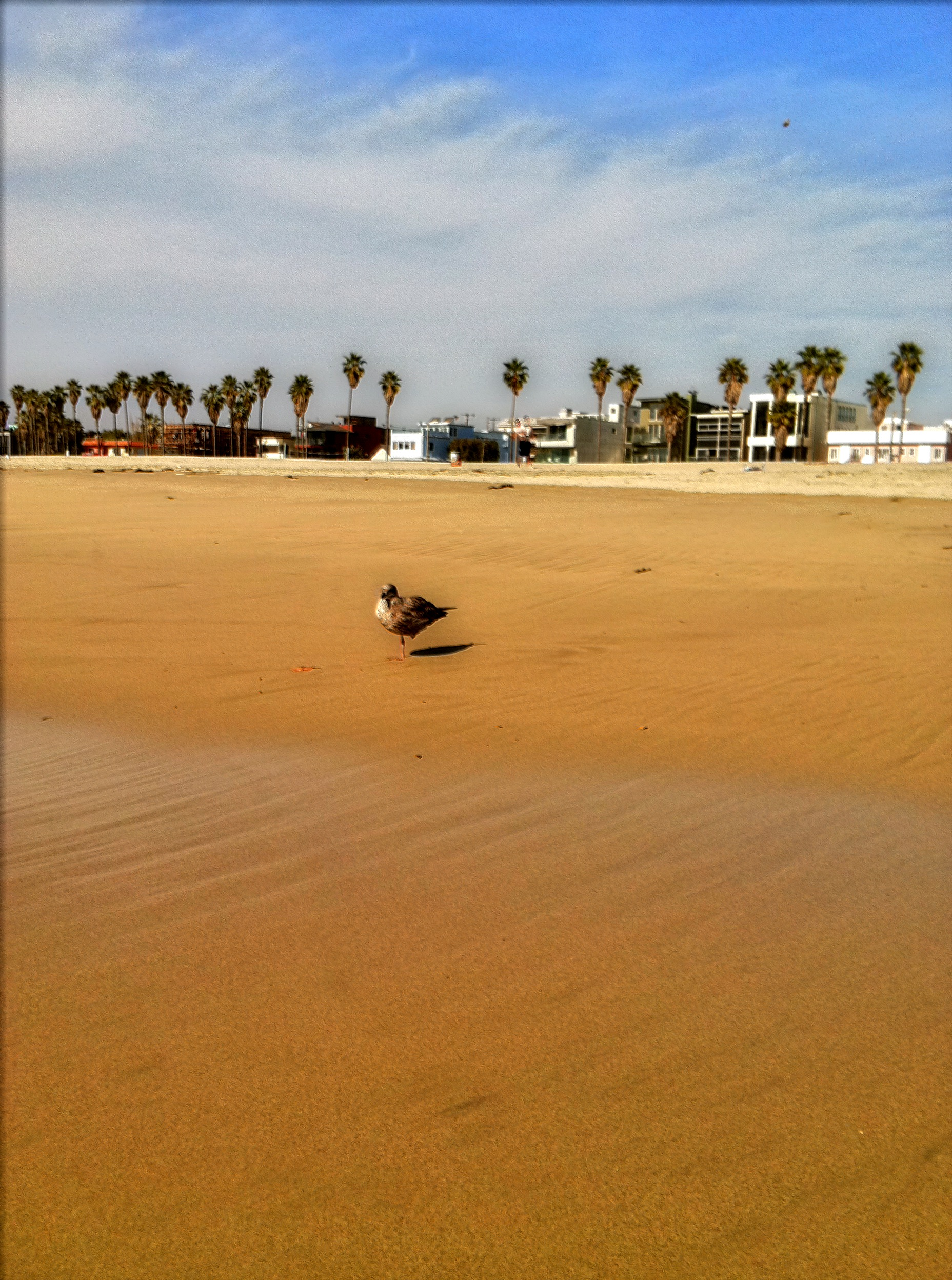
The movie was shot on and around Los Angeles beaches.

In the 1990s stuntman and martial artist Matt McColm began an acting career. McColm’s black belt in Kenpo Karate and good looks grabbed the attention of Hollywood producers. After starring in Red Scorpion 2 (1994), McColm was offered the leading role in Subterfuge. The movie was filmed in and around Los Angeles, California, and it was noted in the episode of The Cult of Muscle podcast: "[the film was] mostly shot on that one corner of the beach they like to use in L.A." IMDb specifies the filming date as August 1995. Underwater scenes were shot, featuring McColm. Subterfuge might have been inspired by the 1977 film The Deep starring Nick Nolte.

Jack Gill, who went on to work with McColm on another low-budget action movie The Protector (1997), served as a second unit director and stunt coordinator. Mohammed Tabatabai choreographed the film's fight scenes. Stock footage for Subterfuge was provided by Cameo Film Library. The original soundtrack was recorded, produced, engineered and mixed by Jim Halfpenny at Tracks Allott Studios, and includes harmonica blues-rock songs. Among the songs written by Halfpenny was "Cold, Cold World", sung by Tracy Adams.

One of the opening scenes, set in a bar, was arranged in a self-reflexive, metafictional manner: McColm's character turns off television, bored with a genre film, and provides a commentary: "If you've seen one action movie, you've seen 'em all, right?"

== Release ==
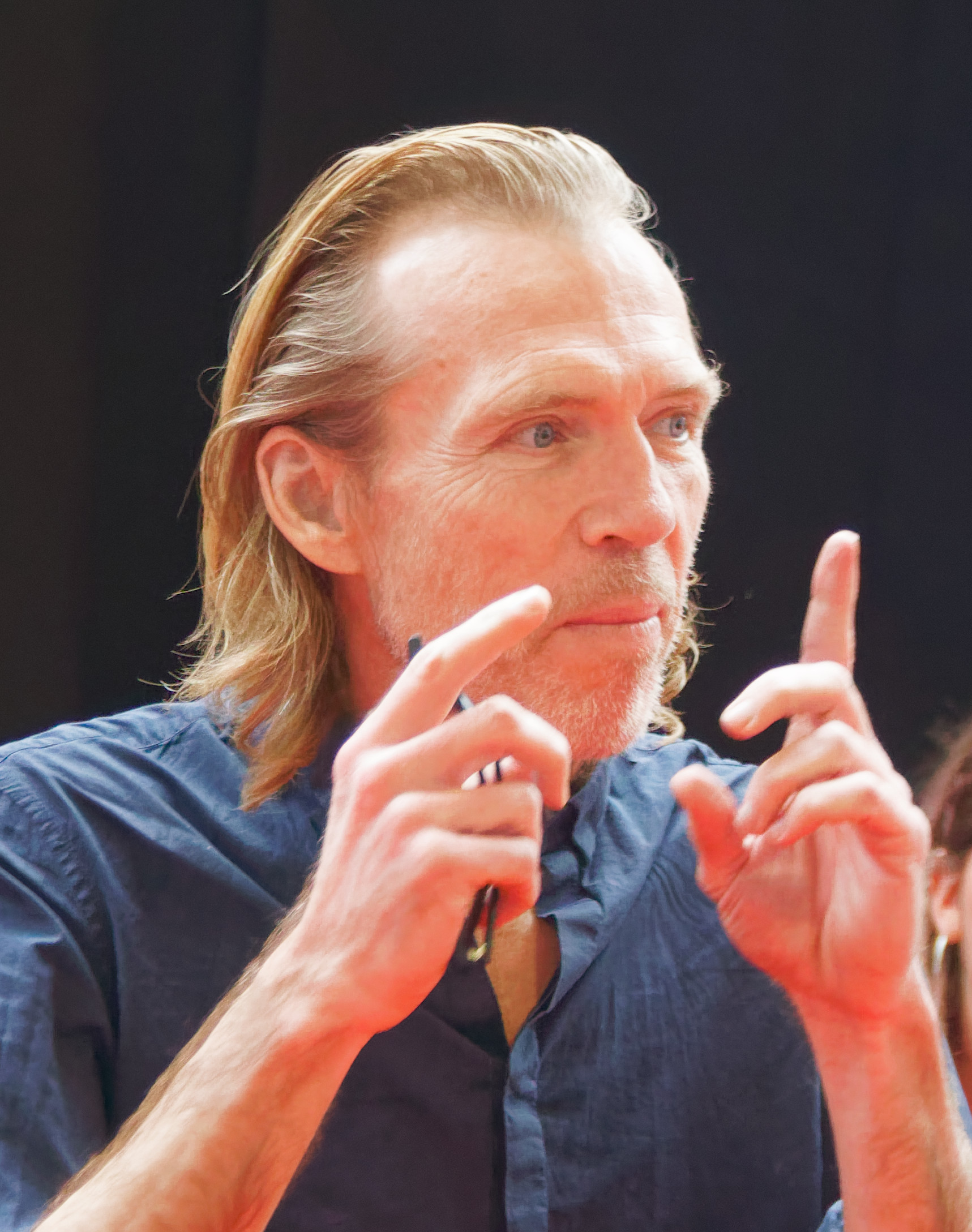
Richard Brake was cast in the supporting role as Pierce Tencil.

After the theatrical premiere on February 23, 1996, Avalanche Home Entertainment released the movie in the United States on VHS in 1998. Its cover presented a shirtless, beaten up McColm—showing off his pectoral muscles prominently—aiming a gun towards the viewer. The movie was promoted with a tagline: "The Cold War just got hot again!" Cranked on Cinema critic noted that McColm's "juiced-up" physique and Amanda Pays' sexual attractiveness, along with the "large gun", gave the cover an erotic appeal. A straight-to-video release followed in late 1998 in Finland, and in February 1999 in Japan. The movie was also distributed on VHS in Greece, under the title Αποστολη στη Μαυρη θαλασσα ("The Mission on the Black Sea").

The movie has been aired on Brazilian television in May 1998 as Subterfuge: Mistério No Mar Negro (Mystery On The Black Sea). It was released on VHS as well—two years earlier, in July 1996. German television aired the movie under the altered title Into Deep – Jagd in der Tiefe (Hunt in the Depths), although it was released in the country on video, too—as Mission Subterfuge. It premiered on ProSieben in February 2000, and was subsequently shown on Star TV in Switzerland.

Metropolitan Filmexport distributed Subterfuge on DVD in France, and Manga released it on VHS in Spain. Additionally, the movie was released as Ex-Navy S.E.A.L. in Norway and as Tajna przesyłka (Secret Delivery) in Poland.

== Reception ==
The movie received mixed reception. The Ultimate Action Movies editor praised the exotic locations and their surroundings as they "provide a nice backdrop for the action that ensues". He also complimented McColm's work, especially his "kenpo moves", and believed Jonathan Slade was a "likeable" character, attributing McColm "the it factor". In a review for Comeuppance Reviews it was observed that "McColm is a far better central hero than, say, Frank Zagarino, and his meatheadiness contrasts well with his brother in classic 'odd couple' fashion." The film's humor and Richard Brake's performance were also praised.

On the other hand, Jamie Lisk of Cranked on Cinrma thought Brake "overplays his part", and McColm "comes off as a big lug for the most part". In the episode of The Cult of Muscle podcast McColm's central character has been described as a "large, imposing dude" and a "corn-fed, cinderblocking all-American male". The podcasters found Subterfuge be "more convincing than your typical Vietnam-set action-war movie", and "slightly more authentic than Macaroni Combat movies". They did, however, call it "very dry for a movie that takes place [mostly] on a beach and in the water". Writing for Il Zinefilo, Willy l'Orbo labelled Subterfuge as humorous and fun but also poorly written and full of "goofy" mistakes.

TV Today rated the movie one star (out of three possible). Cinema.de provided a positive note, giving it three stars out of five, and calling it a "well-built B movie". In a review for KinoPoisk the character of Jonathan Slade was praised because he "knows how to fight", is "physically impressive", and "knows how to impress the fairer sex". Movies Room described the movie as "tacky and second-class" but also "enjoyable".

=== Accolades ===
The movie was nominated for the 2002 Smithee Award. The "Smithees" was an annual ceremony that celebrated the worst films released on video. In the official write-up for the film on the Smithee Awards' website Subterfuge was called "a totally pointless action flick that tries to think, but nothing happens".

== Legacy ==
The movie was mentioned in the April 2019 episode of the Red Letter Media's Best of the Worst series. It may have inspired two action thriller films with similar plots: 1998's Firestorm, and Into the Blue starring Paul Walker and Jessica Alba (2005). Soon after its premiere, in November 1996, the Los Angeles Times labelled Matt McColm as "Hollywood's next generation action star," following in the footsteps of Arnold Schwarzenegger and Sylvester Stallone.
