= The Protector (1997 film) =

- Directed by: Jack Gill
- Written by: Jack Gill; Dee McLachlan; Andrea Buck; Stuart Beattie
- Produced by: Steven Paul
- Starring: Matt McColm; Ron Perlman; Carol Alt; John Rhys-Davies; Annabel Schofield
- Cinematography: Robert Hayes
- Edited by: Steve Mitchell Beebe
- Music by: Mark Holden
- Production companies: Crystal Sky Worldwide; Krago's Island Inc.
- Distributed by: Concorde Pictures; A-Pix Entertainment
- Release date: December 23, 1997; (United States)
- Running time: 95 minutes
- Country: United States
- Language: English
- Budget: $1 million

The Protector is a 1997 American action film written by Jack Gill, Dee McLachlan, Stuart Beattie, and Andrea Buck, and directed by Gill. It stars Matt McColm as Kenneth James Conway, an ex-commando and a private detective investigating the disappearance of a virologist. Supporting cast includes Ron Perlman, John Rhys-Davies, and Carol Alt.

== Cast ==
- Matt McColm as Kenneth James Conway
- Ron Perlman as Dr. Ramsey Krago
- Carol Alt as Agent Monica McBride
- Annabel Schofield as Marisa
- John Rhys-Davies as Rasheed
- Morgan Brittany as Sloane Matthews
- Clint Howard as Hutch
- Michael Paul Chan as Dr. Anthony Mane
- Rodger LaRue as Agent Leo Dumass
- Jack Gill as Dr. Stanley Erhardt
- Terrence Stone as Myles Vale
- Henry Kingi as Van Driver
- Patrick St. Esprit as Security Guard
- Kane Hodder as Guard

== Production ==
In 1996, stuntman and actor Matt McColm has been labelled by Los Angeles Times as "Hollywood's next-generation action star," following in the footsteps of Arnold Schwarzenegger and Sylvester Stallone. His previous entries in the action genre included Red Scorpion 2 (1994) and Subterfuge (1996). The Protector gave McColm a chance to impress the audiences with both his perfect musculature and martial-arts skills—since he has a black belt in Kenpo Karate. Prior to the filming director Jack Gill worked primarily as a stuntman, stunt coordinator, and second unit director.

== Release ==
A-Pix Entertainment released the movie in the United States on VHS in 1997. The following year the film was released in Canada by Coscient Astral Distribution, under the title Conway.

== Reception ==
Douglas R. Pratt reviewed The Protector in his 2004 guide Doug Pratt's DVD: Movies, Television, Music, Art, Adult, and More!, Volume 1, noting, "the story is an adequate backdrop for the gunfights, car crashes, and other activities this sort of movie can be depended upon to deliver." In a journal for Dammaged Goods—a cinema-related website—The Protector was called a "quasi exploitative action film" that "makes good use of its resources, has some fun in the process and doesn't try to be something it's not." Furthermore, the central performance is praised: "Stunt performer turned leading man Matt McColm plays Conway with rogue charm while flexing his muscles and martial-arts prowess. Ruggedly handsome, McColm doesn't take things too seriously and is a likeable enough hero." Yippee-ki-yay! editor Albert Nowicki complimented McColm in his leading role, calling his character a "convincing cinematic tough guy", with a "stunning musculature" and good magnetism. He went on to berate other cast members, though, and called Carol Alt an "expressionless beauty".

Cinema.de provided a negative note, giving it one star out of five. Movies Room described the movie, along with Subterfuge, as "tacky and second-class" but also "enjoyable".
