= The River Within =

- Theatrical Poster
- Directed by: Zac Heath
- Written by: Zac Heath
- Produced by: Kerri Cissna; Zac Heath
- Starring: Josh Odor; Craig Luttrell; Jaclyn Friedlander; Craig Morris; Maurice Mejia
- Cinematography: Derrick Sims
- Edited by: Derrick Sims
- Music by: Megan McCauley; Craig Morris; Rachel Farrar
- Distributed by: Inspired Life Films; Cloud Ten Pictures
- Release date: September 11, 2009
- Running time: 92 minutes
- Country: United States
- Language: English

The River Within is a 2009 film written and directed by Zac Heath and starring Josh Odor, Craig Luttrell, Jaclyn Friedlander, Craig Morris, and Maurice Mejia. It was produced by Inspired Life Films and Fabled Motion Pictures and released in theaters September 11, 2009 and on DVD November 10, 2009 by its distributor, Cloud Ten Pictures. It was shot on location along the Spring River in Arkansas.

== Plot ==
"What am I doing here?" is a question that has haunted Jason (Josh Odor) ever since he heard his dad utter it prior to his death. Now, fresh out of law school, and with an upcoming bar examination to prepare for, the highly motivated and strictly disciplined Jason returns to the small Southern United States town he grew up in to spend the summer studying. He quickly reconnects with his old friends Paul (Craig Luttrell) and Layla (Jaclyn Friedlander), but it is an encounter with David (Craig Morris), a pastor at a local church, that changes his life forever. David offers Jason a part-time summer job as a youth director, and he reluctantly accepts it. But as he gets to know the kids and their personal struggles, he begins to discover a passion that he didn't know existed within him; and he soon realizes that his dad's lifelong question has now become his own.

== Cast ==
- Josh Odor as Jason (credited as Josh Lauri)
- Craig Luttrell as Paul
- Jaclyn Friedlander as Layla
- Craig Morris as David
- Maurice Mejia as Marcus
- Thomas Moore as Michael

== Filming ==
The River Within was filmed in Northeast Arkansas in the summer of 2008. Various locations included the Spring River, the Arkansas Methodist Medical Center, Shiloh and Campground Methodist Churches, and the Collins Theater, where the 1941 world premiere of The Man Who Came to Dinner starring Bette Davis took place.

The film's budget only allowed for 16 days of shooting. In order to save money on hotels, most of the cast and crew slept in guest rooms or pool houses that belonged to the director's family and friends in Paragould. "Wherever we could cut corners on the budget, we did," Heath said.

== Release ==
The River Within was released in select theaters in Tennessee, Arkansas, Iowa, Nebraska, and Louisiana on September 11, 2009. The film was released on DVD on November 10, 2009.
