= LBJ: The Early Years =

1987 television film directed by Peter Werner

- Genre: Drama
- Directed by: Peter Werner
- Starring: Randy Quaid; Patti LuPone; Morgan Brittany; Pat Hingle; Barry Corbin; Jack Blessing
- Theme music composer: Johnny Mandel
- Country of origin: United States
- Original language: English

Production
- Executive producer: Charles Fries
- Producers: John Brice; Sandra Saxon Brice
- Cinematography: John Lindley
- Editor: Steve Cohen
- Running time: 155 minutes
- Production companies: Louis Rudolph Films; Brice Productions; Fries Entertainment

Original release
- Network: NBC
- Release: February 1, 1987

LBJ: The Early Years is a television movie that appeared on the NBC network in February 1987, depicting the pre-presidential life of Lyndon B. Johnson, the 36th president of the United States. Actor Randy Quaid won a Golden Globe award for his portrayal of Johnson.

== Plot ==
In 1934, then clerk for Texas Congressman Richard Kleberg, Lyndon Johnson (Randy Quaid) runs up the steps of the Capitol to meet with future Speaker of the House Sam Rayburn (Pat Hingle), who is sure he will work beside Johnson in the future. Johnson then runs off with his boss's Cadillac, driving all night to pick up his fiancée Claudia "Lady Bird" Taylor (Patti LuPone) at the home of her father in Texas. They both drive back to Washington, D.C., and have a bad run-in with Kleberg's standoffish wife, who thinks he is sabotaging her husband for his own political gain.

After being fired by the Congressman (through his wife's intervention), Johnson wakes up one morning to find that another Congressman has died, leaving the seat vacant. He prods a local judge who is very politically connected, Judge Alvin Wirtz (Barry Corbin), into giving him a chance to run for Congress. Judge Wirtz tells Johnson that the former Congressman's widow might run for the seat, and that he'll need $10,000 just to make it a contest. Lady Bird Johnson's father provides the $10,000 and gets confirmation that the widow will not run. Johnson then tours the hill country of Texas, bringing along his father and his wife to campaign. He promises that he shall provide services such as power and running water to the people, and goes stumping, pushing harder and harder. It is after a gruelling schedule and many, many cigarettes and Milk of Magnesia bottles later that the pain is so great in his abdominal area that Johnson collapses. Lady Bird appears at the bedside of her husband, who had an operation to remove a ruptured appendix and is now recuperating. When he awakens, she tells him that he had won the election and calls him 'Congressman'. Johnson is then shown inside the Capitol, taking an elevator ride up with his friend Sam Rayburn, leaving his wife as the elevator doors close.

Johnson receives a phone call that his father had died, and he goes to Texas for his funeral, when he discovers that his father left his mother in thousands of dollars' worth of debt. This revelation, combined with the high cost of running a campaign, forces LBJ to become a friend to lobbyists in order to find money. These new connections mean that not only he can begin to get financial help, but his stalled hydroelectric project gets the help it needs in order to happen. At a party held by his largest backer, Johnson meets a vivacious and attractive woman, Alice Glass (Morgan Brittany), who becomes a lightning rod for his ambition. Despite the threat of another woman, Lady Bird is determined to keep her husband and to help him become even more successful.

It is now 1948, and Johnson now is vying for a Senate seat soon to be vacated by a retiring Senator. His promises kept to the people of the hill country, he still must defeat Governor Coke Stevenson, who battles him for a Texas Democratic caucus vote amid rumors of corruption in the form of vote fixing. A 28–28 deadlock is broken when Johnson's staffers pull onto the floor a drunk member (despite goons under the control of Stevenson trying to prevent it), whose vote gains LBJ the Democratic Senate nomination. LBJ goes on to win the Senate seat in November, easily defeating his Republican opponent.

An ebullient Johnson starts his tenure as United States Senator by parking in the Senate Majority Leader reserved parking spot, much to the chagrin of the parking attendant. The same lot is shown again in the future, and Johnson's name is now fixed on the parking spot. Johnson is now working tirelessly with all of the members of the Senate, battling the troublesome Joseph McCarthy, making amendments to the Taft-Hartley Act, and pressing for civil rights legislation. A new face in Washington, Senator John F. Kennedy, is told under no uncertain terms that a committee spot on the Foreign Relations Committee in the Senate would be his if he stayed for a crucial labor vote. This meeting proved important as time moves forward to 1959, when Kennedy is one of the candidates for nomination in the Presidential campaign for the Democratic Party. A visit by JFK's brother Robert F. Kennedy to Texas is arranged as father Joseph Kennedy, who along with his sons, wish to know if LBJ is running for president or not. Johnson refers to Robert Kennedy as a "Harvard man" in a derisive tone while he discovers Robert's true intentions, and goes out of his way to try to embarrass him while hunting.

The lack of action by Johnson in responding to Kennedy in a timely fashion allows John Kennedy to build up a very strong support network, essentially denying Johnson any real chance at the Presidential nomination. Promised votes by Wyoming, now going over to Kennedy to send him over the top to win the nomination, puts Johnson and his family off. Johnson says that his father was right, and that he made a big mistake by not doing something sooner. An offer of the Vice Presidency by John Kennedy is at first rejected by Johnson because of the advice of Sam Rayburn. The next day, Rayburn tells Johnson that he has changed his mind, and LBJ accepts the offer, despite Robert Kennedy's attempt at preventing the deal.

After JFK is elected in 1960, Johnson soon regrets his decision, and he is made to fill the most benign of roles while the President and his brother shut him out of meetings. This position changes drastically when Kennedy is shot in Dallas in 1963, and Lyndon Johnson becomes the new President of the United States. He accompanies now widow Jacqueline Kennedy, along with his wife, on Air Force One on a trip back to Washington. He takes the Oath of Office by Texas federal district judge Sarah T. Hughes on board the aircraft, and a still of the moment along with a short audio summary of the events after ends the movie.

== Cast ==
- Randy Quaid as Lyndon B. Johnson
- Patti LuPone as Lady Bird Johnson
- Morgan Brittany as Alice Glass
- Pat Hingle as Sam Rayburn
- R. G. Armstrong as Samuel Ealy Johnson Jr.
- Barry Corbin as Alvin J. Wirtz
- Robin Curtis as Jacqueline Kennedy
- Charles Frank as John F. Kennedy
- James F. Kelly as Robert F. Kennedy
- Kevin McCarthy as Joseph P. Kennedy Sr.
- Jack Blessing as Billy Bob
- Anne Haney as Rebekah Baines Johnson
- Don Moss as Hubert Humphrey
- Sandy Ward as Thomas Jefferson Taylor
- Michael Greene as Coke R. Stevenson

== Planned sequel ==
LBJ: The Early Years enjoyed high ratings, received 6 Emmy nominations (including Best Television Movie), a Golden Globe for Randy Quaid, Silver Medal from the Houston Film Festival and the prestigious Peabody Award. There were plans for a sequel, tentatively titled LBJ: The Presidential Years, but the project was shelved due to NBC's hesitancy to dwell on the subject of the Vietnamese war.
