= Terry Burnham =

American actress (1949–2013)

- Burnham in Twilight Zone, 1961
- Born: Elizabeth Teresa Burnham; August 8, 1949; Los Angeles, California, U.S.
- Died: October 7, 2013 (aged 64); Long Beach, California, U.S.
- Occupation: Actress
- Years active: 1955–1971

Elizabeth Teresa "Terry" Burnham (August 8, 1949 – October 7, 2013) was an American actress. She had most of her career as a child actress in television series. She is best known for her performance in the Twilight Zone episode "Nightmare as a Child", which originally aired in 1960.

Burnham played the young daughter of Lana Turner's character in the film Imitation of Life (1959), which was widely popular. Burnham retired from acting in 1971.

== Life and career ==
Elizabeth Teresa Burnham was born on August 8, 1949, in Los Angeles, California. She was the younger of two children born to Guy Calvin Burnham, an aeronautics engineer at Douglas Aircraft Company, and his wife Elizabeth Teresa Buelna Symons, a homemaker. She was raised Catholic and attended St. Maria Goretti Catholic School, St. Cornelius School, Mark Twain Middle School, and Bancroft Junior High School.

On December 22, 1955, Burnham made her television debut at age six alongside Brandon deWilde in the series Climax!, in an episode entitled "The Day They Gave the Babies Away". (This was based on the 1946 novel of the same title, which was also adapted for the 1957 film All Mine to Give.) More prominent roles soon followed, most notably in 1957 with "Let There Be Light", an episode of the series M Squad, which starred Lee Marvin, who Burnham later singled out as her favorite actor. Also that year, Burnham was set to star in a new child-centered series, Turquoise, Inc., whose writer/producers Dick Chevillat and Ray Singer touted her as "TV's first Shirley Temple". That projected series was never produced, but a year later, Burnham appeared on an episode of Temple's own series, entitled "The Magic Fishbone". It was adapted by Margaret Fitts from the Charles Dickens short story of the same name.

She first attracted national attention as "Susie", the 8-year-old daughter of Lana Turner's character in Imitation of Life (1959). Sandra Dee played the girl as a teenager.

Burnham worked in numerous episodes of TV series through the late 1950s and 1960s. She retired from acting in 1971.

== Death ==
On October 7, 2013, Terry Burnham died of a cardiac arrest. As she had no surviving next of kin, her unclaimed cremated remains were stored at Los Angeles County Crematorium. On August 8, 2018, which would have been her 69th birthday, Burnham's ashes were buried at Forest Lawn Memorial Park in Long Beach.

== Filmography ==
Year	Title	Director	Role	Notes	Ref.
1955	Climax!	Allen Reisner	NA	"The Day They Gave Babies Away"	
1957	Whirlybirds	Allen H. Miner	Josie Fisher	"Rampage"	
1957	I Love Lucy	James V. Kern	Girl at birthday party (uncredited)	"Lucy and Superman"	
1958, 1960	M Squad	John Brahm, Paul Stewart	Laurie Grayson, Patti Blocker	"Let There Be Light," "Hideout"	
1958	Hi, Grandma!	Arch Oboler	NA		
1958	Shirley Temple's Storybook	Oscar Rudolph	Princess	"The Magic Fishbone"	
1959	The Danny Thomas Show	Sheldon Leonard	Girl in Play	"Bob Hope and Danny Become Directors"	
1959, 1959, 1961, 1962, 1964	Wagon Train	Allen H. Miner, David Butler, Mitchell Leisen, Jerry Hopper, Joseph Pevney	Marguerite Lindstrom (uncredited), Mary Belle MacAbee, Prudence, Marie Lefton, Charlotte Endicott	"The Ella Lindstrom Story," "The Jess MacAbee Story," "The Patience Miller Story," "The Martin Gatsby Story," "The Melanie Craig Story"	
1959	Tales of Wells Fargo	Earl Bellamy	Josie Brown	"The Branding Iron"	
1959	Cimarron City	Jerry Hopper	Cynthia Barton	"The Unaccepted"	
1959	Imitation of Life	Douglas Sirk	Susie (6)		
1959	Colt .45	William J. Hole Jr.	Emily Bass	"The Saga of Sam Bass"	
1959	The Rough Riders	Franklin Adreon	Molly	"The Wagon Raiders" (aka "Ambush")	
1959, 1961, 1962	General Electric Theater	David Butler, John Rich, Charles F. Haas	Cissy Owens, Lily, Penny	"The Day of the Hanging," "Labor of Love," "Go Fight City Hall"	
1960	The Twilight Zone	Alvin Ganzer	Markie	"Nightmare as a Child"	
1960	Markham	R. Hamer Norris	Judy Frost	"The Cruelest Thief"	
1960	Hawaiian Eye	Alvin Ganzer	Patty Seldon	"With This Ring"	
1960	Key Witness	Phil Karlson	Gloria Morrow		
1960	Shotgun Slade	NA	Linda	"Ghost of Yucca Flats"	
1960, 1962	Thriller	Paul Henreid, Jules Bricken	Tessa Kilburn, Joan Wilson (uncredited)	"The Mark of the Hand," "The Fingers of Fear"	
1961	87th Precinct	John Brahm	Jane Mencken	"Killer's Payoff"	
1962	I Love My Doctor	David Butler	Liz Barkley	TV pilot	
1962, 1963	Leave It to Beaver	David Butler, Hugh Beaumont	Virginia, Beaver's Date (uncredited)	"Beaver's Autobiography," "Lumpy's Scholarship"	
1964	The Magical World of Disney	Byron Paul	Willadean Wills	"For the Love of Willadean: A Treasure in the Haunted House," "For the Love of Willadean: A Taste of Melon"	
1966	Boy, Did I Get a Wrong Number!	George Marshall	Doris Meade		
1966	My Three Sons	James V. Kern	"Call Her Max," "Grandma's Girl"	Georgie, Gail McGee	
1967, 1969	Family Affair	Charles Barton	Ingrid, Rita Stone	"Best of Breed," "Cissy's Apartment"	
1967	Insight	Paul Stanley	Ellen Harriman	"Seeds of Dissent"	
