= The Lloyd Bridges Show =

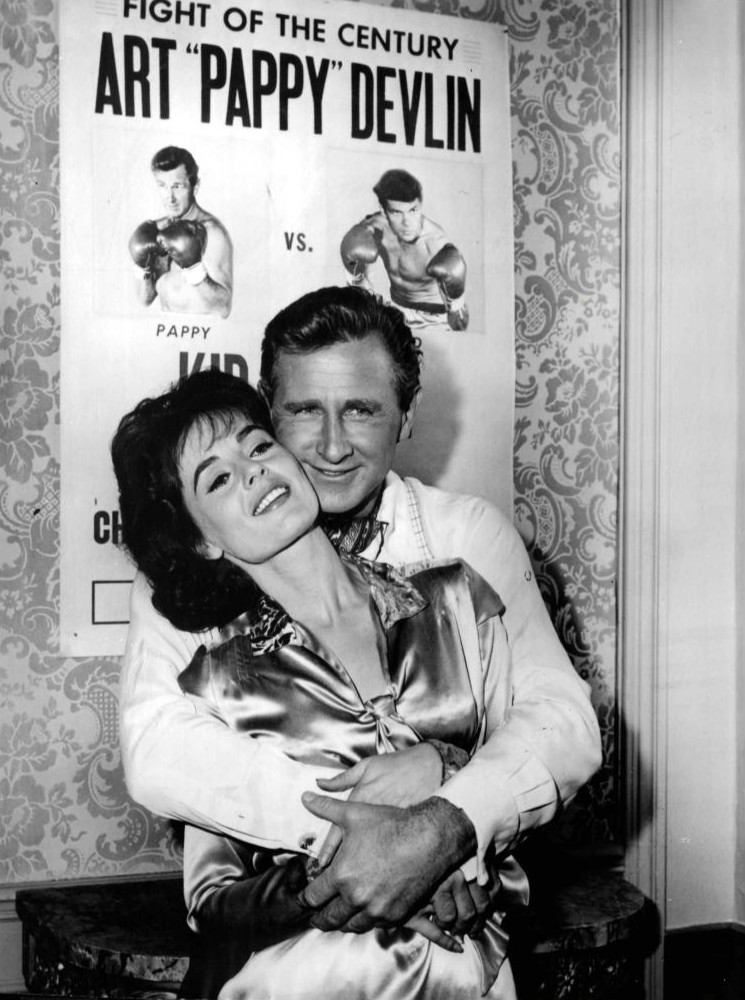
- Lloyd Bridges and Mary Murphy in episode "My Daddy Can Beat Your Daddy" (1963)
- Genre: Anthology drama
- Written by: Robert Towne
- Directed by: John Cassavetes; Jeffrey Hayden; Don Taylor; Abner Biberman; Don Siegel
- Starring: Lloyd Bridges
- Composer: Rudy Schrager
- Country of origin: United States
- Original language: English
- No. of seasons: 1
- No. of episodes: 34

Production
- Executive producer: Aaron Spelling
- Producer: Everett Chambers
- Running time: 22–24 minutes

Original release
- Network: CBS
- Release: September 11, 1962 – May 28, 1963

The Lloyd Bridges Show is an American anthology drama television series produced by Aaron Spelling that aired on CBS from September 11, 1962, to May 28, 1963, starring and hosted by Lloyd Bridges.

== Broadcast history ==
The Lloyd Bridges Show, a Four Star production, aired on Tuesday at 8 p.m. Eastern time; summer rebroadcasts aired from June to September 3, 1963. The series aired opposite the first season of ABC's military drama Combat!, starring Rick Jason and Vic Morrow, and the last season of NBC's western series Laramie starring John Smith, Robert Fuller, and Spring Byington. It followed rebroadcasts of the half-hour version of CBS's Gunsmoke under the title Marshal Dillon, starring James Arness.

== Notable guest stars ==
- Philip Abbott
- Frank Aletter
- Morgan Brittany
- Edgar Buchanan
- Walter Burke
- John Cassavetes
- Lonny Chapman
- Michael Constantine
- Russ Conway
- Gloria DeHaven
- Don Dubbins
- Norman Fell
- Paul Ford
- Dianne Foster
- Betty Garrett
- Don Gordon
- Harry Guardino
- Glynis Johns
- Carolyn Jones
- Werner Klemperer
- Bethel Leslie
- John Marley
- Lee Meriwether
- Ricardo Montalbán
- Kathleen Nolan
- J. Pat O'Malley
- Jerry Paris
- Paul Richards
- Gena Rowlands
- Reta Shaw
- Robert F. Simon
- Maxine Stuart
- Dub Taylor
- Rhys Williams

== Episodes ==
The Lloyd Bridges Show was a 1962–63 anthology series produced by Aaron Spelling, which ran for 34 episodes. For the first three months, Bridges appeared in each episode as anthology narrator Adam Shepherd, and was often also one of the characters in the storyline. Beginning in January 1963 "the show became a straightforward anthology series hosted by Bridges".

No.	Title	Original release date
1	"Wheresoever I Enter"	September 11, 1962
Adam Shepherd (Bridges) is intrigued by a doctor who risks his life to save trapped coal miners. Harry Guardino and Michael Constantine guest star.
2	"El Medico"	September 18, 1962
A tale of a doctor killed while trying to overthrow the United States government. John Cassavetes guest stars.
3	"My Child Is Yet a Stranger"	September 25, 1962
A tug of war between parents of a gifted child, and authorities who want to place the child with a more affluent family.
4	"A Pair of Boots"	October 2, 1962
While visiting a Civil War museum, Adam tries to visualize the era.
5	"Mr. Pennington's Machine"	October 9, 1962
A businessman witnesses deplorable living conditions and black marketeers squeezing the soul out of Hong Kong.
6	"Just Married"	October 16, 1962
Adam Shepherd sees a newlyweds' car being towed away.
7	"Testing Ground"	October 23, 1962
Adam Shepherd fantasizes himself an astronaut while viewing a rocket launch at Cape Canaveral
8	"War Song"	October 30, 1962
Ricardo Montalbán as Navarro in this fantasy of paratroopers during the 1944 Normandy landings.
9	"Yankee Stay Here"	November 13, 1962
Mako as Akai Takahashi. Communists try to stir hatred between Japanese and American people.
10	"The Miracle of Mesa Verde"	November 20, 1962
Shepherd (Lloyd Bridges) fantasizes himself as an outlaw who stashes his booty inside a statue of the Virgin Mary.
11	"Little Man, Big Bridge"	November 27, 1962
Elderly Mr. Plation (Eduardo Ciannelli) wants to get rid of a bridge that he believes harms the environment.
12	"Permission Granted"	December 4, 1962
Seaman McMasters (Bridges) James Hong as a priest. American cultural clashes with Vietnamese refugees.
13	"Gentleman in Blue"	December 11, 1962
Lloyd Bridges as both Adam Shepherd and Capt. Anderson. The single grave of Union Capt. Anderson is kept up by a Southern woman (Dianne Foster).
14	"The Sound of Angels"	December 18, 1962
Adolescent Cindy O'Connell (Cindy Bridges) believes she hears angels. Nancy Gates as Cindy's mother, J. Pat O'Malley as Rev. Charles Abernathy
15	"Now, You Take Your Average Rock..."	December 25, 1962
Bridges as both Foxhall van Courtland and Adam Shepherd. A tale of how a large boulder turned a thriving Arizona community into a ghost town. Marie Windsor as Dolores, Guy Raymond as Henry Thigpen, Paul Ford as George Tuppman.
16	"The Scapegoat"	January 1, 1963
Navy Commander Tyrone (Lloyd Bridges) is charged with establishing a new base on Okinawa Island, but left-over resentments from World War II create a labor shortage.
17	"The Wonder of Wanda"	January 8, 1963
Morgan Brittany as Wanda
18	"My Daddy Can Lick Your Daddy"	January 22, 1963
Lloyd Bridges as Pappy Devlin, Gary Lockwood as boxer Kid Devlin
19	"A Game for Alternate Mondays"	January 29, 1963
Glynis Johns appears as widow Leah Marquand, with Leslye Hunter as her daughter Isabella. Every Monday for four years, the two of them wait at the train station for Leah's long gone boyfriend Bram De Forest (Lloyd Bridges) to return.
20	"A Personal Matter"	February 5, 1963
Dying business executive Stan Rawley (Lloyd Bridges) falls in love with Leslie Kaufman (Gena Rowlands).
21	"The Skippy Mannox Story"	February 12, 1963
Financially strapped baseball team owner Mickey Madden (Lloyd Bridges) can save his team by drafting ace pitcher Skippy Mannox (Beau Bridges), but Skippy has a bit of a problem - he's a hypochondriac.
22	"The Rising of the Moon"	February 19, 1963
Kathleen Nolan stars as Nora
23	"To Walk with the Stars"	February 26, 1963
Jeff Bridges appears as young orphan Dave Melkin, who is inspired by aerial stuntman Bill Wade (Lloyd Bridges)
24	"The Courtship"	March 5, 1963
Diane Baker appears as Birdie
25	"Gym in January"	March 12, 1963
Gloria DeHaven appears as Muriel
26	"The Sheridan Square"	March 19, 1969
Lloyd Bridges as writer Archie Hamilton. Joyce Van Patten appears as Doris Baxter
27	"The Last Lion"	April 2, 1963
Jeff Bell (Lloyd Bridges) hunts down a lion in Africa.
28	"The Tyrees of Capitol Hill"	April 9, 1963
Lloyd Bridges stars as Senator Guthrie when young Phillip Alford (Boford Tyree) becomes a Congressional page in Washington D. C. Edgar Buchanan appears as Andrew Jackson Tyree.
29	"The Waltz of the Two Commuters"	April 16, 1963
Frank Brenner (Lloyd Bridges) falls under the spell of an attractive woman he meets during his mass transit commute into the big city. Linda Christian and Nancy Gates co-star.
30	"Freedom Is for Those Who Want It"	April 30, 1963
During the era of the Czechoslovak Socialist Republic, a group of people plan to escape to freedom by driving a self-made armored tank past the Iron Curtain.
31	"The Ramp"	May 7, 1963
A daily freeway commuter decides to change his routine.
32	"Without Wheat, There Is No Bread"	May 14, 1963
Eduardo Ciannelli, Don Gordon and Robert Carricart guest star in this tale of archeologists who want to help poverty-stricken Bolivia villagers.
33	"The Epidemic"	May 21, 1963
Wanda Hendrix as Anna and Garry Walberg as Dr. Goldstone are caught up in a Yugoslavian health epidemic.
34	"Afternoon of a Champion"	May 28, 1963
Russ Conway and Fabrizio Mioni co-star in this story about a racing driver whose girlfriend wants him to quit the circuit.
