= Captured (1998 film) =

- Directed by: Peter Liapis
- Written by: Peter Liapis
- Starring: Nick Mancuso; Andrew Divoff; Michael Mahonen; Linda Hoffman
- Release date: October 16, 1998
- Running time: 92 min
- Country: United States
- Language: English

Captured is a 1998 direct-to-video action film directed by Peter Liapis and starring Nick Mancuso, Andrew Divoff, Michael Mahonen and Linda Hoffman. The 2019 Argentine-Spanish thriller crime film 4x4 has a similar plot.

== Plot ==
The film follows Holden Downs (Nick Mancuso), a powerful, hot-tempered workaholic real estate developer struggling with an environmental injunction against a property that he plans to build, which threatens to halt construction of his dream development. Brothers Joey (Michael Mahonen) and Robert Breed (Andrew Divoff) attempt to steal Holden's prized possession, a Porsche 911 Turbo until Holden arrives, fights him off and breaks his arm. Robert creates a diversion, knocks Holden down and threatens to steal his car again. Holden enlists the help of his nephew Buddy (Seth Peterson) to reinforce his car's security system, as Holden continues to deal with worsening news about his property development and his crumbling marriage to Faye Downs (Linda Hoffman).

Robert breaks into his house and subsequently attempts stealing the car again, but discovers its new security features: Bulletproof glass, reinforced interior, Remote controlled windows and stereo, and a lockdown feature where he is trapped within the car and held hostage. When Robert refuses to cooperate, Holden begins torturing him by blaring loud music and withholding food and water after mocking him the next day. Meanwhile, Holden loses his case and employees, and suddenly remembers that his maid (Luisa Leschin) is at his house and rushes home just in time to prevent her from entering the garage, where Robert has been honking the horn to summon help after seeing her. Robert continues to mock Holden to the point where he fires a warning shot at Robert, but winds up in a scuffle and Holden replicates Sharia Law and cuts off Robert's fingers with pruning shears.

After seeing Holden's scuffle with an environmentalist (Thad Geer) on the news, Faye decides to return home from visiting her sister Sheila (Beth Tegarden) earlier than planned. Realising that Robert still hasn't come home, Joey decides to look for him and sneaks into Holden's house, encounters Holden and several fights erupt until Joey is shot and killed. After Harry (Paul Collins) visits and announces that he has reached an agreement, Holden leaves for a meeting. Meanwhile, Faye returns home to find Robert trapped in the car, where she opens the door for him, only for her to be locked in. Robert soon destroys the phone lines and waits for Holden to return, then locks Holden in the car while holding Faye hostage and taunting him. Meanwhile, Holden calls Buddy for help. As Buddy frees him, Holden runs back in the house armed with a Speargun and instructs Buddy to hide in the garage. However, Buddy decides to run into the house anyway to try to help, only to get shot when he is mistaken for Robert. Soon, Robert and Holden encounter each other and begin a scuffle, only to be interrupted by Faye with a gun pointed at both of them. As they both try to reason with her, she eventually shoots Holden. The film ends with Faye and Robert sitting on the floor.

== Cast ==
- Nick Mancuso - Holden Downs
- Andrew Divoff - Robert Breed
- Linda Hoffman - Faye Downs
- Michael Mahonen - Joey Breed
- Seth Peterson - Buddy
- Paul Collins - Harry
- Christopher Kriesa - Charlie
- Beth Tegarden - Sheila
- Luisa Leschin - Gladys
- Thad Geer - Marcus Tanner (in credits; though often referred to as Carl Tanner)
- Lisa Long - Cindy
- Ray Rodriguez - Security guard
- Tricia Lee Pascoe - Reporter
