= Carol Alt =

American model and actress (born 1960)

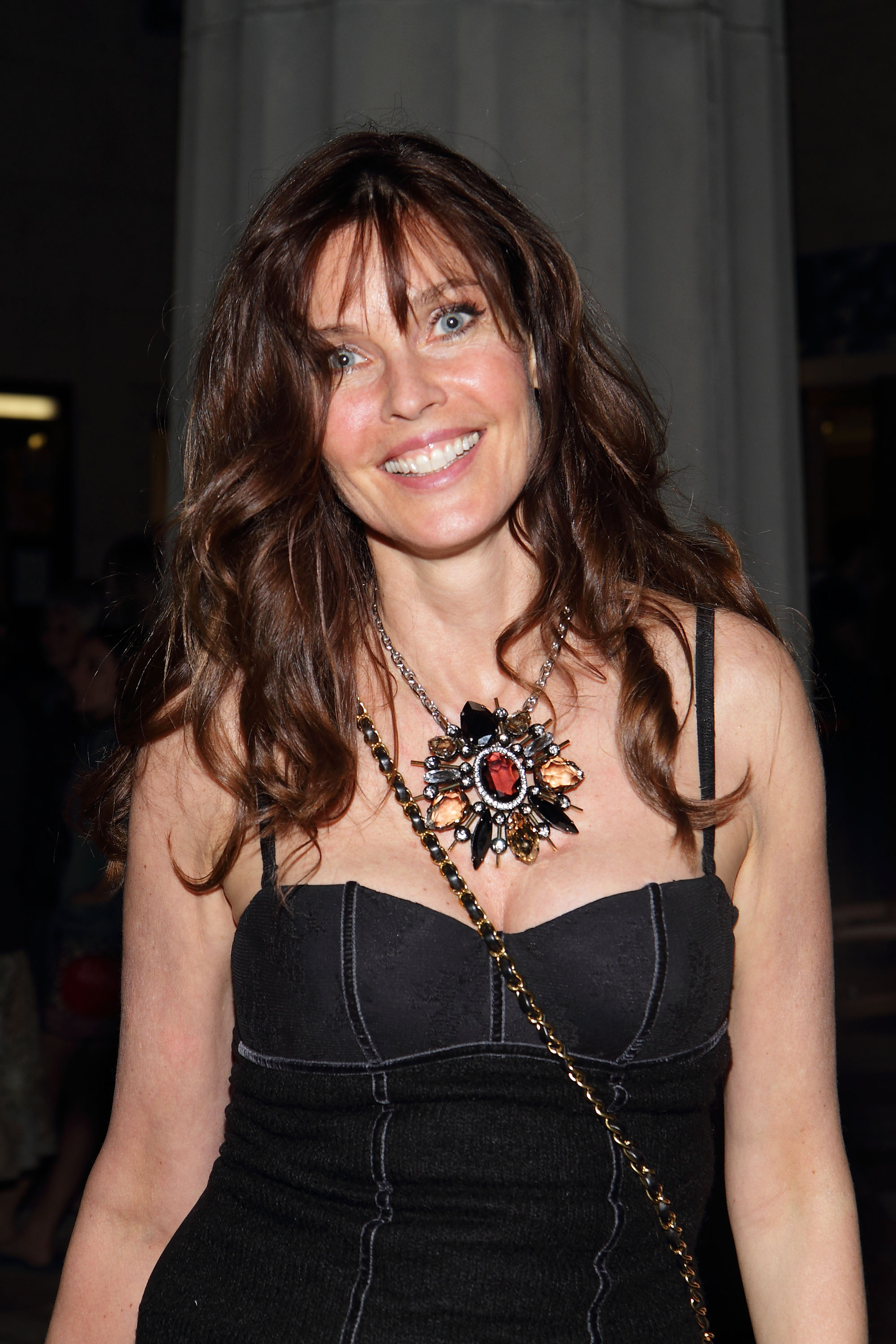
- Alt in 2012
- Born: Carol Ann Alt; December 1, 1961 (age 64); New York City, US
- Other name: The Face
- Occupations: Model; actress
- Years active: 1978–present
- Modeling information
- Height: 5 ft 11 in (1.80 m)
- Hair color: Brown
- Eye color: Blue
- Agency: The Model CoOp (New York) d'management group (Milan)
- Website: carolalt.com

Carol Ann Alt (born December 1, 1961) is an American model and actress.

== Early life ==
Alt was born in Flushing, Queens, New York, the daughter of Muriel, an airline employee and model, and Anthony Alt, a battalion chief from the 18th Battalion (South Bronx) of the New York City Fire Department. She was noticed waiting tables in East Williston, Long Island, and decided at age 18 to try modeling as a summer job to save money for college. She is the third of four children. She has an older brother, Anthony Jr. (1955–2005), an older sister, Karen, and a younger sister, Christine. Alt's maternal grandparents were German immigrants, while her paternal grandmother was Irish.

== Career ==
Alt's first big break in modeling was in 1979, when she was featured on the cover of Harper's Bazaar magazine. However, she garnered publicity in 1982 when she featured on the Sports Illustrated Swimsuit Issue cover. During the 1980s, she appeared on over 500 magazine covers, becoming one of the most famous models of her era, attaining supermodel status. Alt appeared on the covers of Vogue, Vogue Paris, Vogue Italia, Vogue UK, Mademoiselle, Elle and Cosmopolitan. She was referred to as "The Face" by Life Magazine. At the height of her popularity, she was the face of ad campaigns for Diet Pepsi, General Motors, Cover Girl Cosmetics, Noxzema, Hanes, Givenchy, Versace, Armani and numerous others. She was the first model to produce her own posters and calendars.

Since 1986, she has appeared in various films, many of which were Italian productions. She played the character of Kelly LaRue in the TV series Thunder in Paradise in 1994. She played Agent Monica McBride in the 1997 action film The Protector (opposite Matt McColm), and Karen Oldham in the television adaptation of Peter Benchley's Amazon (1999). She also had a few minor television roles, including one episode of Wings and a voice role in an episode of King of the Hill. In 2004, she starred in Snakehead Terror, a Canadian film. She starred in the Italian TV series Caterina e le sue figlie 2 and the TV movie Piper; both were aired on Canale5 in 2007. In 2009, she was one of the contestants of the Italian version of Dancing with the Stars (Rai Uno). Piper — The series, a spinoff of the successful TV movie of the same title, was broadcast on Canale5 that same year.

She took on several model/spokesman projects, including becoming a Le Mirador skin-care line consultant and appearing on late-night TV infomercials. Alt has written two books, promoting her raw food diet plans. She was the cover girl for Travelgirl Magazine (in 2004 and 2008). She appeared on the cover and in a nude pictorial in Playboy's December 2008 issue. She placed #5 on askmen.com's Top 10 Models of All Time list.

In 2006, Alt was honored as Grand Marshal at the German-American Steuben Parade in New York City, the largest celebration of German–American Friendship in the United States. Thousands of fans greeted her on Fifth Avenue. She was a contestant on NBC's 2008 Celebrity Apprentice, with Donald Trump, competing for her charity, the Tony Alt Memorial Foundation (named for Alt's brother), which raises funds for scholarships for young adults to continue their studies. She ended up in third place before being fired, but was brought back for the final task of the show and was chosen by finalist Piers Morgan to help him become the Celebrity Apprentice. Alt raised a total of $40,000 for her charity. In 2008, she founded Raw Essentials, a skin-care and beauty products line with her partners Philip Masiello and Steven Krane.

In 2001, Alt appeared on the U.S. version of Who Wants To Be A Millionaire, playing for charity.

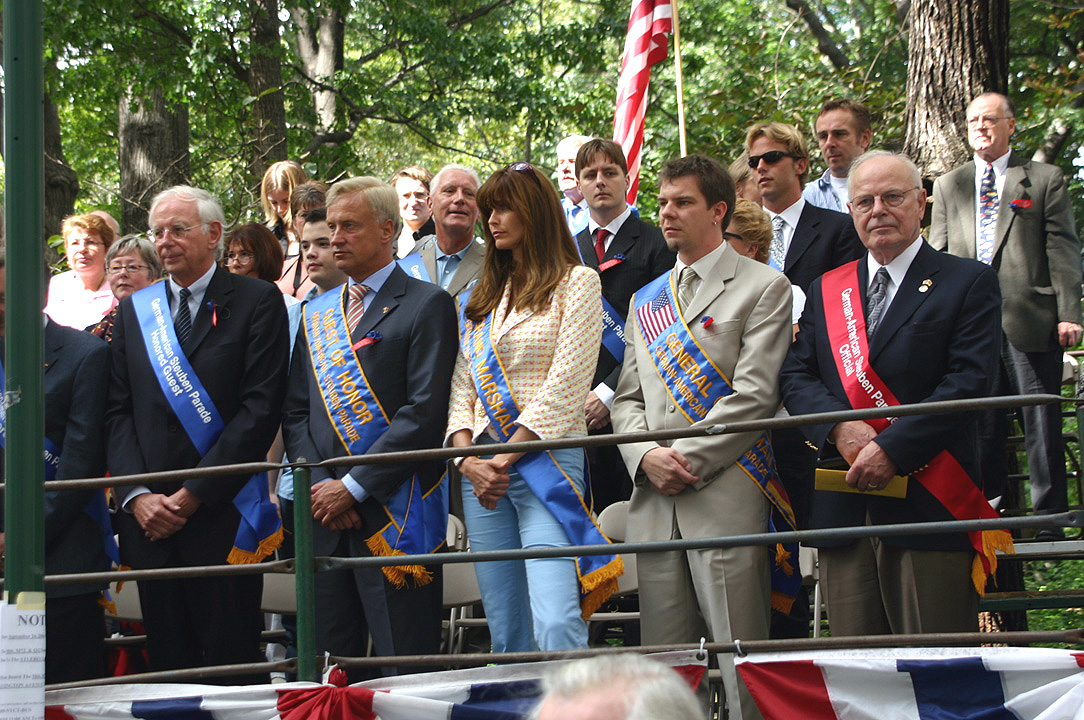
Carol Alt (front center) as a Grand Marshal at the New York City Steuben Day Parade (2006)

In September 2013, Alt joined the Fox News team with her half-hour Saturday afternoon TV show, A Healthy You & Carol Alt, covering her experience and knowledge about wellness and longevity. Each installment ends with a segment called Ask Carol, in which she answers questions she receives on Facebook and Twitter. In October 2013, Alt was inducted into the Ride of Fame. A double-decker New York City tour bus was dedicated to her and her career.

In 2015, Alt co-starred in the Lifetime shoplifting comedy Stealing Chanel with Lydia Hearst, Anna Maria Cianciulli, and John Rothman.

== Personal life ==
Alt married former New York Rangers defenseman Ron Greschner at St. Aidan's Roman Catholic Church in Williston Park, Long Island, New York, in 1983. They divorced in 1996. Alt was previously in a long-term relationship with former New York Islanders forward Alexei Yashin until 2019.

== Filmography ==
=== Film ===
Year	Title	Role(s)	Notes
1987	Monte Napoleone	Margherita	
1987	My First Forty Years	Marina Caracciolo	
1988	Bye Bye Baby	Sandra	
1988	Treno di panna	Marsha Mellows	
1989	Mortacci	Alma Rossetti	
1989	La più bella del reame	Marina Ripa	
1991	Millions	Betta	
1991	Speaking of the Devil	Veronica Flame	
1992	Un orso chiamato Arturo	Alice Goldsmith / Shirley Humphrey	
1992	Beyond Justice	Christine Sanders	
1993	Anni 90: Parte II	Barbara	
1994	Thunder in Paradise	Kelly LaRew	Direct-to-video release
1994	Ring of Steel	Tanya	
1995	Deadly Past	Saundra	
1997	Private Parts	Gloria	
1997	Crackerjack 2	Dana Townsend	
1997	The Protector	Agent Monica McBride	
1999	Stormtrooper	Grace	
1999	Apocalypse II: Revelation	Cindy Bolton	
2001	My Best Friend's Wife	Judy	
2002	Hitters	Marie	
2003	The Look	Edy LaFontaine	
2005	The Sign of the Cross	Linda	
2006	A Merry Little Christmas	Irene Manning	
2007	Homo Erectus	Queen Fallopia	
2008	The Man Who Came Back	Angelique Paxton	
2012	To Rome with Love	Carol	
2015	Stealing Channel	Evi	
2020	Un figlio di nome Erasmus	Alexandra	
2023	My Last Best Friend	Sarah Rennard	
2023	Improvvisamente a Natale mi sposo	Serena	

=== Television ===
Year	Title	Role(s)	Notes
1982	Capitol	Carol Gershner	2 episodes
1987	Houston Knights	Carol H.	Episode: "Mirrors"
1987	Telegatto 1987	Herself / Co-host	Annual ceremony
1988	Il vizio di vivere	Rosa	Television film
1989	Il principe del deserto	Catherine Sanders	Main role
1990	B.L. Stryker	Tiger	Episode: "Plates"
1990	Vendetta: Secrets of a Mafia Bride	Nancy Pertinace	Lead role
1993	Missione d'amore	Stella	3 episodes
1993	Due vite, un destino	Lidia Dominici	Television film
1993	Vendetta II: The New Mafia	Nancy Pertinace	Lead role
1993	Miss USA 1993	Herself / Judge	Annual beauty contest
1994	Thunder in Paradise	Kelly LaRue	Main role
1995	Baywatch Nights	Cassidy	Episode: "Pursuit"
1996	Wings	Tracy Hayes	Episode: "The Lyin' King"
1998	Catch Me If You Can	Trish Gannon	Television film
1998	King of the Hill	Marci (voice)	Episode: "Peggy's Pegeant Fever"
1999	Diagnosis: Murder	Tanya Simone	Episodes: "Trash TV: Part 1 & 2"
1999–2000	Amazon	Karen Oldham	Main role
2003	Who Wants to Be a Millionaire	Herself / Contestant	3 episodes
2004	Snakehead Terror	Lori Dale	Television film
2005	Swarmed	Cristina Brown	Television film
2007	Caterina e le sue figlie	Ines Tramonti	6 episodes
2008	The Celebrity Apprentice	Herself / Contestant	Season 1
2009	Piper	Eleonora D'Aragona	Main role
2009	Ballando con le Stelle	Herself / Contestant	Season 5
2010	Celebrity Ghost Stories	Herself	Season 2, episode 7
2013	Miss Universe 2013	Herself / Judge	Annual beauty contest
2013–2015	A Healthy You & Carol Alt	Herself / Host	Talk show
2020	The Real Housewives of New York City	Herself	Episode: "Sheer Madness"
2025	Paper Empire †		Upcoming series

== Bibliography ==
- Ragan, David (1992). Who's Who in Hollywood. New York, NY: Facts on File. ISBN 0-8160-2011-6.
- Alt, Carol (2004). Eating in the Raw: A Beginner's Guide to Getting Slimmer, Feeling Healthier, and Looking Younger the Raw-Food Way. Clarkson Potter. ISBN 140005284X.
- Alt, Carol (2007). The Raw 50: 10 Amazing Breakfasts, Lunches, Dinners, Snacks, and Drinks for Your Raw Food Lifestyle. Clarkson Potter. ISBN 978-0307351746.
- Alt, Carol (2008). This Year's Model. William Morrow Paperbacks. ISBN 978-0061366246.
- Alt, Carol (2009). Model, Incorporated. William Morrow Paperbacks. ISBN 978-0061565977.
