= Vendetta: Secrets of a Mafia Bride =

- Screenplay by: Ennio De Concini; Alan Di Fiore
- Story by: Sveva Casati Modignani
- Directed by: Stuart Margolin
- Starring: Carol Alt; Eric Roberts; Eli Wallach
- Composers: Riz Ortolani; Bruce Raddell; Stuart Margolin
- Original language: English
- No. of seasons: 1
- No. of episodes: 3

Production
- Cinematography: Ennio Guarnieri

Original release
- Release: 1 April 1990 – 1990

Vendetta: Secrets of a Mafia Bride (Italian: Donna d'onore) is a 1990 American-Italian television crime-drama miniseries directed by Stuart Margolin, that aired in first run syndication. It is based on the novel Donna d'onore by Sveva Casati Modignani. Its 1993 sequel is titled Vendetta II: The New Mafia.

== Plot ==
A girl's father is accidentally murdered during a botched mob hit. The don feels guilty and decides to take care of her. She grows up and winds up falling in love with one of his henchman, who happens to be her father's killer.

== Cast ==
- Carol Alt as Nancy Pertinace
- Eric Roberts as Sean McLeary
- Eli Wallach as Frank Latella
- Serena Grandi as Addolorata Pertinace, Nancy's mother
- Burt Young as Vincent Dominici
- Nick Mancuso as Danny La Manna
- Jason Allen as Junior
- Victor Argo as Persico
- Thomas Calabro as Nearco
- Eva Grimaldi as Brenda
- Anthony DeSando as Albert La Manna
- Enrico Lo Verso as Vito
- Stuart Margolin as Chinnici
- Billy Barty as Victor
- Gianni Nazzaro as Nancy's father
- Mickey Knox as Corallo
- Max Martini as Taylor Carr
