= Saving God =

- Directed by: Duane Crichton
- Written by: Michael Jackson
- Starring: Ving Rhames; Dean McDermott; Ricardo Chavira
- Production companies: Clear Entertainment; Cloud Ten Pictures
- Distributed by: Cloud Ten Pictures
- Release date: October 18, 2008
- Running time: 96 minutes
- Country: Canada
- Language: English

Saving God is a 2008 Christian drama film written by Michael Jackson and directed by Duane Crichton. The film stars Ving Rhames, Dean McDermott and Ricardo Chavira, and was released on DVD and Blu-ray on October 18, 2008, by Cloud Ten Pictures and Clear Entertainment.

== Plot ==
Saving God follows ex-convict turned pastor Armstrong Cane (Ving Rhames) as he returns to his family neighborhood to preach. As he attempts to rebuild the now crime-ridden area, he also tries to help a young drug dealer named Norris (Dwain Murphy) turn his life around.

== Cast ==
- Cole Mellows as son
- Ving Rhames as Armstrong Cane
- Dean McDermott as Henry James / Blaze
- Ricardo Chavira as Rev. Danny Christopher
- Genelle Williams as Ashley Ellis
- Kate Todd as Sherri Butler
- K. C. Collins as Mike
- Richard Leacock as Officer Earl
- Kim Roberts as Dr. Munson
- Kedar as Deacon Jake
- Ardon Bess as Ken Salter
- Dwain Murphy as Norris Johns

== Reception ==
DVD Verdict's David Johnson felt the film was "well-acted, smartly paced, realistic and surprising in its plot twists" that achieves a more realistic feel through the persuasive performances of its actors. The Dove Foundation reviewer Edwin L. Carpenter considered the film to be "well written, directed and acted" and awarded the film its "Seal of family approval" and rated it "five Doves." Ted Baehr of Movieguide, writing for GoFish Productions, felt the film started in a predictable fashion and that the story was weak at times, but did praise its ending. He also felt Ving Rhames' performance was "stellar".

== Awards ==
- Best Foreign Film – Drama at the 2009 International Family Film Festival
- Best Director - Feature Narrative at the 2009 FirstGlance Hollywood 9 Awards
- Official Selection at the 2009 Real to Reel International Film Festival
