= Star Games =

Syndicated American television series

Star Games is a television series which ran in weekly syndication from September 7, 1985 to March 1, 1986. It features teams of actors representing various American TV shows competing in sports events. The events the teams competed in include swim sprints and relays, kayaking, track sprints and relays, a bicycle relay, and an "Apache Relay" obstacle course.

The show ran for two seasons of 13 episodes. The host throughout was former Olympic decathlon champion and actor Bruce Jenner. Pamela Sue Martin co-hosted for Season One, while Season Two had Morgan Brittany. Former American football player and actor Dick Butkus served as the show's "Special Referee".

The series was similar in presentation to Battle of the Network Stars, and debuted only four months after the 18th special aired. The program was distributed by Viacom, now CBS Media Ventures.

== Seasons ==
=== Season One ===
The first season was won by a team representing Falcon Crest, with a team from General Hospital finishing second. Other strong-performing teams from the first season included Days of Our Lives, Still the Beaver, and a combined team from Fame/Gimme a Break!. Among other teams that entered: Roots, The Paper Chase, Dance Fever, Eight is Enough, The Love Boat, The Playboy Club, NNTN, The Young and the Restless, The Ted Knight Show, The Improv and Three's Company/Three's a Crowd.

=== Season Two ===
The second season was won by a team from Santa Barbara. The runners-up were a combined team from Charlie & Co./The Love Boat and The Insiders/Miss Universe. Other notable teams from the second season included Dynasty, The Brady Bunch, Hollywood Beat, Growing Pains, and Dallas, as well as a team representing the cast of Porky's movies: Knots Landing, Comedy Store, Diff'rent Strokes, The Waltons, St. Elsewhere, Capitol, Hill Street Blues, and Soap.
