= Valley of the Shadow =

- The Twilight Zone episode
- Episode no.: Season 4 Episode 3
- Directed by: Perry Lafferty
- Written by: Charles Beaumont
- Production code: 4861
- Original air date: January 17, 1963

Guest appearances
- Ed Nelson; Natalie Trundy; David Opatoshu; Dabbs Greer; Jacques Aubuchon; James Doohan; Morgan Brittany (as "Suzanne Cupito"); Sandy Kenyon; Henry Beckman; Bart Burns; King Calder; Pat O'Hara

Episode chronology
← Previous "The Thirty-Fathom Grave"	Next → "He's Alive"
- The Twilight Zone (1959 TV series) (season 4)

"Valley of the Shadow" is a 51-minute episode of the American television anthology series The Twilight Zone. In this episode, a reporter is held captive in a small town after he discovers its incredible secret.

== Opening narration ==
You've seen them. Little towns, tucked away far from the main roads. You've seen them, but have you thought about them? What do the people in these places do? Why do they stay? Philip Redfield never thought about them. If his dog hadn't gone after that cat, he would have driven through Peaceful Valley and put it out of his mind forever. But he can't do that now, because whether he knows it or not his friend's shortcut has led him right into the capital of the Twilight Zone.

== Plot ==
Reporter Philip Redfield gets lost while driving with his dog, Rollie, on unfamiliar back roads, and stops in Peaceful Valley, New Mexico, seeking food, directions, and gasoline. The gas station attendant fills his tank but is curt and claims the only restaurant in town is closed. Rollie leaps out of the car to chase a little girl's cat up a tree. The girl uses a strange device to make the dog disappear. When Philip confronts the girl's father, he pretends to go looking for Rollie, then secretly uses the device to make the dog re-materialize.

Philip and his dog seek food at the town's hotel. Ellen, the proprietor, is as curt as the gas station attendant and insists they have no rooms available even though the keys to all the rooms are still on display at the check-in desk. Philip's suspicions are fully aroused by this time, but questioning Ellen about the residents' strange behavior gets him nowhere. He drives out of town only to run into an invisible wall which totals his car and kills Rollie. A band of Peaceful Valley residents are waiting at the scene and take him to the town elders while another resident brings Rollie back to life.

The town elders question Philip on why he came to Peaceful Valley and whether anyone knows where he is. They show him some of the technology they have, including a replicator which can produce any object given its molecular formula and a ray which can reverse any injury, including death. The elders refuse to share this technology, given to the town 104 years earlier by a scientist from an unknown planet, until "men learn the ways of peace". Philip rebukes them for decreeing themselves the sole people capable of using these extraterrestrial gifts responsibly, and for squandering technology that could be used to cure all illness and end hunger. The town elders insist that if they shared the technology it would be used for weapons, and tell Philip that due to his chance witnessing of the device used to make his dog disappear, he must either stay forever in Peaceful Valley or be executed to preserve the town's secrets.

Philip is now a prisoner in his new home, with an invisible wall placed to keep him from venturing beyond the yard. He becomes romantically involved with Ellen, and tries to make her realize her own lack of freedom, knowing that the town elders will not let any of Peaceful Valley's residents leave for fear they would reveal the town's secrets. Seemingly persuaded that he cannot reciprocate her love unless she sets him free, Ellen disables the invisible wall and offers to drive Phillip out of town. He arms himself by replicating a revolver and steals a book containing the equations that explain the town's technology, but sets off an alarm in the process. When the three town elders attempt to prevent his escape, he shoots them.

Once Philip and Ellen are outside the town limits, she shows him that the book is blank, then uses a device to de-materialize him. Ellen was a plant, Philip's entire escape a test. The elders, revived by the technology, claim his decision to create and use a gun confirms their belief that the people of Peaceful Valley are the only ones fit to use the alien technology. Ellen confesses her involvement was not entirely a deception, implying that her feelings for him were real. The elders "execute" Philip by rendering him unconscious, erasing his memories of Peaceful Valley, and returning him and his car to the gas station. When he wakes up, the attendant has just finished filling his tank. He asks for directions and drives out of town, experiencing a moment of déjà vu when he sees Ellen, who has tears in her eyes.

== Closing narration ==
You've seen them. Little towns, tucked away far from the main roads. You've seen them, but have you thought about them? Have you wondered what the people do in such places, why they stay? Philip Redfield thinks about them now and he wonders, but only very late at night, when he's between wakefulness and sleep in the Twilight Zone.

== Production ==
This is one of many Twilight Zone episodes that re-used props from MGM's 1956 film Forbidden Planet. In this case the matter-transporting "dissemblers" used by the Peaceful Valley inhabitants originated as the C57-D crew communicators in Forbidden Planet.

== Cast ==
- Ed Nelson as Philip Redfield
- Natalie Trundy as Ellen Marshall
- David Opatoshu as Dorn
- Dabbs Greer as Evans
- Jacques Aubuchon as Connelly
- James Doohan as Johnson (role listed as "Father" in credits)
- Morgan Brittany (as Suzanne Cupito) as Cissie Johnson (role listed as "Girl" in credits)
- Sandy Kenyon as Fredericks (role listed as "The Attendant" in credits)
- Henry Beckman as Townsperson
- Bart Burns as Townsperson
- King Calder as Townsperson
- Pat O'Hara as Townsperson
