= Matt McColm =

American actor

- Born: Matthew McColm; January 31, 1965 (age 61)
- Occupations: Actor; stuntman; model
- Years active: 1979–2016

External image
- McColm as Jonathan Slade in Subterfuge (1996).

Matt McColm (born January 31, 1965) is an American actor and stuntman, and former model.

== Biography ==
Born in 1965, he has a twin brother named Mark. His family comes from Santa Barbara. He attended Bishop García Diego High School.

He has modeled for Ralph Lauren, Gianni Versace, Calvin Klein, and Doug Ordway early in his career. In the 1990s he was one of the top male models. As an actor, he is best known for portraying Johnny Domino, the lead character in the 1997–1999 television series Night Man, and Agent Thompson, the assassin who kills Trinity at the climax of The Matrix Reloaded (2003). He also appeared as Vick Chamberlain, a T-888 Terminator in the television series Terminator: The Sarah Connor Chronicles (2008). McColm also portrayed the henchman of Jason Statham in the 2004 film Cellular.

McColm has a black belt in Kenpo Karate, and was known for his heavily muscular physique. He served as Arnold Schwarzenegger's body double in Terminator 2: Judgment Day (1991). Often playing macho-type characters, he starred in multiple low-budget action films during the 90s, the first one being Red Scorpion 2 (1994)—a sequel to the Dolph Lundgren vehicle. In a movie, which is largely unrelated to the first installment, McColm appears as a leading hero Nick Stone, an agent of the National Security Agency. The actor's next entry in the action genre came with the 1996 movie Subterfuge, co-starring Jason Gould (as Alfie Slade) and Richard Brake. McColm portrayed Jonathan Slade, a retired military hero carrying out a secret task for the Central Intelligence Agency. The movie was called "a mediocre spy-thriller," but its cast received some praise. Writing for Ultimate Action Movies, Andrew Babcock opined that McColm "had the it factor," and "gave a very likable performance." He concluded that "McColm simply knows action" and is "an underrated performer." An editor from Comeuppance Reviews stated that "McColm is a far better central hero than, say, Frank Zagarino, and his meatheadiness contrasts well with his brother in classic ‘odd couple’ fashion."

He was named "the new action star of the 90s" by the International Producers' Association (IPA). Robert W. Welkos of Los Angeles Times declared that McColm might be "Hollywood's next generation action star," following in the footsteps of Arnold Schwarzenegger and Sylvester Stallone. In 1997 he appeared in the lead role in the Jack Gill-directed film The Protector. Portraying Kenneth James Conway, an ex-commando and a private detective, he had a chance to impress the audiences with both his martial arts skills and a perfect musculature. In a review for The Unknown Movies McColm's role was summarized positively: "He looks good, shows that he knows a fair bit about martial arts, and he does seem to be putting some effort in his performance." Another favorable commentary was written by Action-Flix: McColm was believed to be "totally charismatic in the hero role," and his physical expression was compared to that of an "80s jock." Likewise, the performance was praised by a cinema-related website Dammaged Goods: "Stunt performer turned leading man Matt McColm plays Conway with rogue charm while flexing his muscles and martial arts prowess. Ruggedly handsome, McColm doesn't take things too seriously and is a likeable enough hero."

In Acts of Betrayal (1997) McColm appears as Lance Cooper, an FBI agent who must protect a damsel in distress. The same year he also starred in a low-budget action movie Fight and Revenge, which is believed to be lost nowadays. He played the lead character, Sergeant John Trenton, an American commando, captured and tortured for information during his mission. In 1999 the actor filmed his scenes for the Clint Eastwood-directed adventure drama Space Cowboys. He portrayed the U.S. Air Force navigator named "Tank" Sullivan as a young man, while James Garner played his older self. The movie was released in August 2000 to positive critical reception.

He was set to return as Agent Thompson in The Matrix Resurrections (2021), although his character never appeared in the final film.

He was set to star as a lead in a Jack Abramoff-produced, 25 million dollars-costing action–adventure movie called An Act of Courage. It was supposed to be filmed in Malaysia in 1992.

His twin brother Mark did stand-in for him in several television and movie shows. McColm's stunt performer credits include Cyborg (1989), Pearl Harbor (2001), Argo (2012), The Wolverine (2013), and about seventy five other titles. In the official 2021 write-up for the film review website Rotten Tomatoes, it is written that "square-jawed McColm has been an in-demand stuntman for over thirty years."

== Filmography ==
- 1985 St. Elsewhere (TV series) as College Kid
- 1988 They Live as Police Officer
- 1989 Cyborg as Pirate / Bandit
- 1991-2001 Baywatch (TV series) as Frank Riddick / Derek Hart / Drew Lawrence
- 1991 Night of the Warrior as Still Model
- 1994 The Adventures of Brisco County, Jr. (TV series) as Lieutenant Rayford
- 1994 Red Scorpion 2 as Nick Stone
- 1996 Subterfuge as Jonathan Slade
- 1996 Mask of Death as Man
- 1996 American Tigers as Man
- 1997-1999 Night Man (TV series) as Johnny Domino / Nightman
- 1997 NightMan (TV movie) as Johnny Domino / Nightman
- 1997 The Protector (aka Body Armor; Conway) as Kenneth James Conway
- 1997 Acts of Betrayal as Lance Cooper
- 1997 Fight and Revenge as Sergeant John Trenton (lost film)
- 2000 Space Cowboys as Young Tank Sullivan
- 2001 Bette (TV series) as Handsome Man
- 2003 The Matrix Reloaded as Agent Thompson
- 2003 Enter the Matrix (video game) as Agent Thompson (voice)
- 2004 Cellular as Detective Deason
- 2005 The L Word (TV series) as Bouncer
- 2005 The Island as Cop
- 2005 Confessions of an Action Star (aka Sledge: The Untold Story) as Commander
- 2005 Criminal Minds (TV series) as SWAT #1
- 2006 Southland Tales as Bar Bouncer
- 2006 CSI: Miami (TV series) as Jake Richmond
- 2007 Live Free or Die Hard as Terrorist
- 2008-2009 Terminator: The Sarah Connor Chronicles (TV series) as Vick Chamberlain
- 2009 Knight Rider (TV series) as First Henchman
- 2010 Iron Man 2 as Guard
- 2011 The Mechanic as Bodyguard
- 2011 The Hit List as Squad Car Cop
- 2011 The Double as Guard #2
- 2012 Argo as Fighting Movie Star
- 2013 R.I.P.D. as Male Cop
- 2014 John Wick as Club Goon
