= Morgan Brittany =

American actress (born 1951)

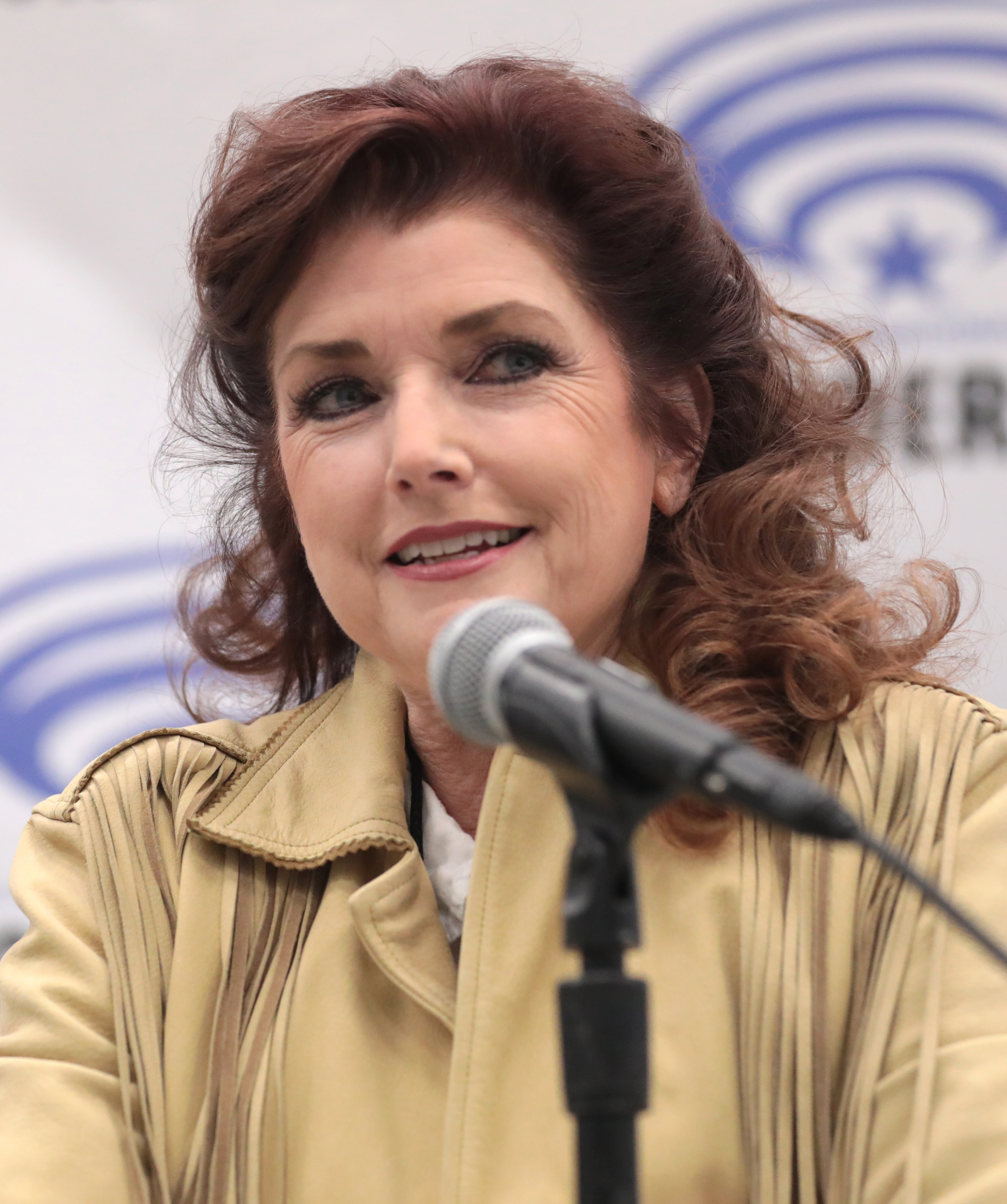
- Brittany at the 2023 WonderCon
- Born: Suzanne Cupito; December 5, 1951 (age 74); Los Angeles, California, U.S.
- Occupation: Actress
- Years active: 1957–present
- Spouse: Jack Gill (m. 1981)
- Children: 2

Morgan Brittany (born Suzanne Cupito; December 5, 1951) is an American actress. She began her career as a child appearing in the film Gypsy (1962), in a 1960 episode of The Twilight Zone entitled "Nightmare as a Child", another in 1963 entitled "Valley of the Shadow" and another in 1964 (credited as Suzanne Cupito) entitled "Caesar and Me". She went on to appear in Stage to Thunder Rock (1964) and Yours, Mine and Ours. In the 1970s, Brittany began work as a model joining Ford Models. She played Vivien Leigh in films The Day of the Locust (1975), Gable and Lombard (1976) and The Scarlett O'Hara War (1980). Brittany is best-known for portraying Katherine Wentworth, the scheming younger half-sister of Pamela Ewing and Cliff Barnes, on the primetime soap opera Dallas (1981–1985, 1987).

== Career ==
=== Early child career ===
Los Angeles-born Suzanne Cupito began her acting career as a child under her real name. She appeared on many programs in the 1950s and 1960s, beginning at age five in a 1957 episode of the CBS television network anthology series Playhouse 90 (or at that same age in an episode of Sea Hunt). In January 1960, Cupito displayed her talent as a ballet dancer on The Dinah Shore Chevy Show. Three months later, she followed that up with her first of three Twilight Zone episodes, appearing as a little girl in "Nightmare as a Child", for which she remained uncredited on-screen despite having dialogue. Cupito also portrayed Sissy Johnson in the season-four episode "Valley of the Shadow" and the vicious brat Susan in the season-five episode "Caesar and Me" (as Susanne Cupito).

Cupito was featured in the musical film Gypsy (1962), as Baby June. She appeared in the episode "Daughter for a Day" on ABC's My Three Sons (1962) as Jeannie Hill. Cupito appeared in the episode "Daddy Went Away" on CBS's Gunsmoke (May 11, 1963) as Jessica Damon. She appeared uncredited in the birthday party and schoolhouse scenes in Alfred Hitchcock's The Birds (1963).

In 1963, Cupito played Winter Night in the episode "Incident of the Hostages" of Rawhide. In 1964, she starred as a blind girl named Minerva Gordon in a two-part episode of The Outer Limits, "The Inheritors", and appeared in the Western film Stage to Thunder Rock.

In 1966, Cupito appeared in the series finale of the Western Branded, playing an orphan named Kellie in the episode of the same name. She was part of the ensemble cast in the film Yours, Mine and Ours (1968), which is led by Lucille Ball and Henry Fonda. Cupito also appeared in the season-eight premiere episode of The Andy Griffith Show titled "Opie's First Love" as Mary Alice.

Cupito appeared in two episodes of Lassie, "Lassie and the Swamp Girl" and "Little Dog Lost" as Mattie in the mid-1960s. She followed that up with appearances on Gunsmoke and other shows. At the age of 15, after appearing in Yours, Mine and Ours, Cupito's childhood career ended and she completed her education at Cleveland High School, Reseda, California.

=== Adult career ===
At age 18, Cupito changed her name to Morgan Brittany and then appeared with Gene Kelly in his Las Vegas show, Gene Kelly's Wonderful World of Girls, as a dancer. She then moved to New York City, where she modeled for the Ford modeling agency, and appeared in several TV commercials and print ads (including a three-year stint as "The Ultra Brite Toothpaste Girl"), and was spokesmodel for brands such as L'Oreal, Maybelline, Ford, Levi's, and Camay. In December 1972, she played Cynthia, a childhood friend of Bridget's (Meredith Baxter), in episode 12, "The Homecoming" on Bridget Loves Bernie. In 1974, Brittany was hired by Japanese cosmetics company Kanebo to be the "face" of their product, Ireine, so moved to Tokyo from 1974 to 1976 and traveled around the world as the image of Kanebo Cosmetics.

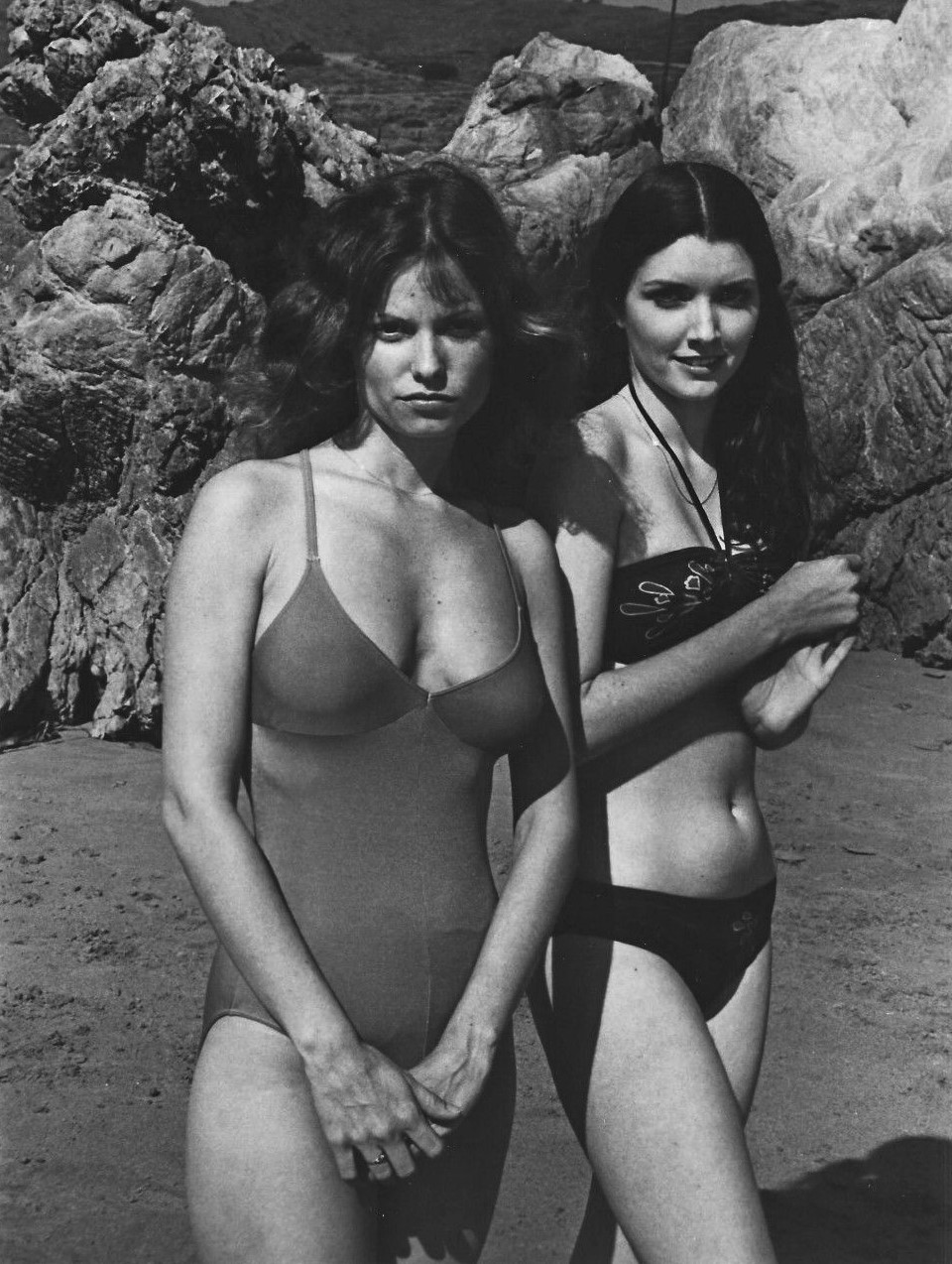
Brittany and Kay Lenz in the television film The Initiation of Sarah (1978)

Brittany portrayed actress Vivien Leigh in Gable and Lombard (1976) a biography of Clark Gable and Carole Lombard. She also appeared in the John Schlesinger film The Day of the Locust (1975) as Leigh in the climax of the film. That was followed by TV movies and series, such as The Amazing Howard Hughes (1977), The Initiation of Sarah (1978), Death Car on the Freeway (1979), The Dream Merchants (1980), and LBJ: The Early Years (1987). In 1980, while filming an episode of The Dukes of Hazzard, Brittany met her future husband, stuntman Jack Gill.

Brittany appeared again as Vivien Leigh in the climax of the made-for-TV movie about the search for an actress to star in Gone with the Wind's film adaptation, The Scarlett O'Hara War (1980).

This caught the attention of the producers of Dallas, who were searching for an actress to play Katherine Wentworth, the scheming half-sister of Pamela Ewing and Cliff Barnes. Brittany debuted on Dallas in the 1981–82 season and her role as Katherine continued, on and off, until 1987. In 1985, she returned in that season's finale, where her character killed Bobby Ewing by striking him with a car, killing herself in the process. She made a brief, final appearance on the series in 1987, which was plausible storyline-wise because Bobby's death and Katherine's turned out to be part of Pamela's 31-episode dream (i.e., season 9).

In 1984, Brittany co-starred in the short-lived ABC drama series, Glitter, as Kate Simpson, a reporter for an entertainment magazine. This was one of several collaborations with producer Aaron Spelling throughout her career. Her first show with him had been an appearance in Burke's Law, in 1964 when Brittany was a child. Later, as an adult, she appeared in seven episodes of The Love Boat, Hotel, Fantasy Island, Melrose Place, and the 1990s revival of Burke's Law. Brittany appeared in The Wild Women of Chastity Gulch (1982).

Brittany co-hosted the syndicated sports show Star Games. and later hosted more than 100 episodes of the magazine show Photoplay, produced by Jack Haley Jr.

Brittany guest-starred on such other series as Married... with Children; Murder, She Wrote; The Perry Mason Mysteries; Dear John; Sabrina the Teenage Witch; and The Nanny. In film, Brittany starred in Sundown: The Vampire in Retreat (1989).

=== Later years ===
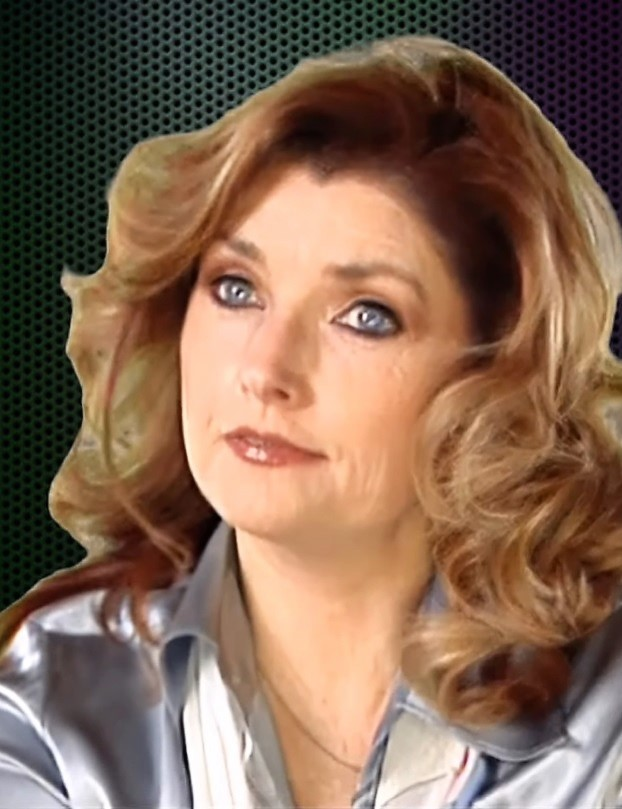
Brittany in a 2020 interview

In the 1990s, Brittany appeared in independent films, including Riders in the Storm (1995), Legend of the Spirit Dog (1997), The Protector (1997), The Biggest Fan (2002), Mothers and Daughters (2006), and Americanizing Shelley (2007). She also appeared in the docudrama, 1 a Minute (2010).

== Personal life ==
Brittany married stuntman Jack Gill in 1981. They have two children, daughter Katie and son Cody.

As of 2014, Brittany is a conservative political commentator and author. She writes a weekly column for WorldNetDaily.

Her first book, with co-authors Ann-Marie Murrell and Dr. Gina Loudon, What Women Really Want, was released September 2, 2014. She is a recurring guest on Hannity (FOX News), and The Rick Amato Show (One America) and has appeared on The Kudlow Report (CNBC), Fox & Friends, The Dennis Miller Show, and Huckabee.

She is a co-owner and anchor for PolitiChicks, an online news site with a conservative perspective. Her second book, with co-author Ann-Marie Murrell, was released in 2017. PolitiChicks: A Clarion Call to Political Activism is a compilation book of essays from "PolitiChicks" writers. Brittany now travels the country speaking at major venues including The Heritage Foundation and other conservative organizations.

== Filmography ==
=== Film ===
Year	Title	Role	Notes
1962	Gypsy	Baby June	
1963	The Birds	Brunette Girl at Birthday Party	Uncredited
1964	Stage to Thunder Rock	Sandy Swope	
1968	Yours, Mine and Ours	Louise Beardsley	
1975	The Day of the Locust	Vivien Leigh	Uncredited
1976	Gable and Lombard	Vivien Leigh	
1979	In Search of Historic Jesus	Mary	
1983	The Prodigal	Sheila Holt-Browning	
1989	Sundown: The Vampire in Retreat	Sarah	
1995	Riders in the Storm	Rita	
1997	The Protector	Sloane Matthews	
1997	Legend of the Spirit Dog	Elizabeth	
2005	The Biggest Fan	Mrs. Francis	
2006	Mothers and Daughters	Abbey	
2007	Americanizing Shelley	Georgina	
2010	1 a Minute	Herself	Docudrama

=== Television ===
Year	Title	Role	Notes
1960	Playhouse 90	Little Girl	Episode: "The Shape of the River"
1960	The Twilight Zone	Little Girl	Episode: "Nightmare as a Child"
1960	Sea Hunt	Cindy	Episode: "Cindy"
1961	Gunslinger	Sally Gannet	Episode: "The Hostage Fort"
1961	Thriller	Doris Carlisle	Episode: "The Fingers of Fear"
1961	Window on Main Street	Small Girl	Episode: "The Letter"
1962	The Detectives	Leslie Martell	Episode: "Saturday Edition"
1962	The Lloyd Bridges Show	Rene-Sue Apple	Episode: "My Child Is Yet a Stranger"
1962	My Three Sons	Jeannie Hill	Episode: "Daughter for a Day"
1963	The Lloyd Bridges Show	Wanda	Episode: "The Wonder of Wanda"
1963	The Dick Powell Show	Josie	Episode: "The Third Side of a Coin"
1963	Rawhide	Winter Night	Episode: "Incident of the Hostages"
1963	Gunsmoke	Jessica	Episode: "Daddy Went Away"
1963	The Richard Boone Show	Sally McNeil	Episode: "All the Comforts of Home"
1963	The Twilight Zone	Girl	Episode: "Valley of the Shadow"
1964	Ben Casey	Lisa Beldon	Episode: "I'll Get on My Ice Floe and Wave Goodbye"
1964	Bob Hope Presents the Chrysler Theatre	Madeline Foy	Episode: "The Seven Little Foys"
1964	The Twilight Zone	Susan - Agnes' Niece	Episode: "Caesar and Me"
1964	Daniel Boone	Naomi Fluellen	Episode: "The Family Fluellen"
1964	Special for Women: A Child in Danger	Mary Clark	Television special
1964	The Outer Limits	Minerva Gordon	Episode: "The Inheritors"
1964	The Tycoon	Nellie Adams	Episode: "No Place Like Home"
1965	Burke's Law	Lolita	Episode: "Who Killed Mother Goose?"
1965	Lassie	Mattie Dawes	Episode: "Lassie and the Swamp Girl" and "Little Dog Lost"
1965	Dr. Kildare	Harriet Kirsh	Episode: "A Little Child Shall Lead"
1965	My Three Sons	Audrey	Episode: "Mary-Lou"
1966	Branded	Kellie	Episode: "Kellie"
1966	Meet Me in St. Louis	Agnes	Television film
1967	My Three Sons	Melinda Hendricks	Episode: "Melinda"
1967	The Andy Griffith Show	Mary Alice Carter	Episode: "Opie's First Love"
1968	Land's End	Jeannie Crawford	Television pilot
1971	Love, American Style		Episode: "Love and the Teddy Bear"
1972	Bridget Loves Bernie	Cynthia Hamilton	Episode: "The Homecoming"
1976	The Quest	Annabelle	Episode: "Portrait of a Gunfighter"
1977	The Amazing Howard Hughes	Ella Hughes	Television film
1977	Delta County, U.S.A.	Doris Ann	Television film
1978	The Initiation of Sarah	Patty Goodwin	Television film
1979	Samurai	Cathy Berman	Television film
1979	The Fantastic Seven	Elena Sweet	Television film
1979	Death Car on the Freeway	Becky Lyons	Television film
1979	California Fever	Connie	Episode: "Hardrock Rally"
1980	Buck Rogers in the 25th Century	Raylyn Derren	Episode: "Happy Birthday, Buck"
1980	When the Whistle Blows	Helen	Episode: "God's Country"
1980	The Scarlett O'Hara War	Vivien Leigh	Television film
1980	The Dukes of Hazzard	Mary Lou Pringle	Episode: "The Hazzardville Horror"
1980	The Dream Merchants	Astrid James	Miniseries
1981	Faeries	Princess Niamh	Television film
1981	Fantasy Island	Tessa Brody	Episode: "My Late Lover/Sanctuary"
1982	The Wild Women of Chastity Gulch	Lannie	Television film
1983	Fantasy Island	Gina	Episode: "Operation Breakout/Candy Kisses"
1983	The Fall Guy	Rita Garrick	Episode: "Inside, Outside"
1983	Masquerade	Buffy Huntington	Episode: "Diamonds"
1984—1985	Glitter	Kate Simpson	Series regular, 14 episodes
1985	Half Nelson		Episode: "Pilot"
1985	Murder, She Wrote	Tiffany Harrow	Episode: "Footnote to Murder"
1981—1986	The Love Boat	Various characters	6 episodes
1986	The Wizard	Whitney Ross	Episode: "Born to Run"
1984—1986	Hotel	Various characters	3 episodes
1987	LBJ: The Early Years	Alice Glass	Television film
1981—1985, 1987	Dallas	Katherine Wentworth	56 episodes
1987	Perry Mason: The Case of the Scandalous Scoundrel	Marianne Clayman	Television film
1989	L.A. Law	Tamara Jacobs	Episode: "Izzy Ackerman or Is He Not"
1989	Dear John	Liz	Episode: "Friends and Lovers"
1989	Married with Children	Marilyn Beamis	Episode: "Life's a Beach"
1990	The Saint: The Big Bang	Verity	Television film
1990	Murder, She Wrote	Candice Ashcroft	Episode: "How to Make a Killing Without Really Trying"
1990	B.L. Stryker	Donna Whitehall	Episode: "Night Train"
1992	Silk Stalkings	Carol Patrick	Episode: "Witness"
1994	Burke's Law	Laura Gardner	Episode: "Who Killed Skippy's Master?"
1995	The Nanny	Judy Silverman	Episode: "Kindervelt Days"
1995	Melrose Place	Mackenzie Hart	Episodes: "The Big Bang Theory" and "Postmortem Madness"
1997	Silk Stalkings	Beverly Drake	Episode: "Dirty Little Secrets"
2001	Sabrina the Teenage Witch	Mrs. Scott	Episodes: "My Best Shot"
2002	V.I.P.	Jeweller	Episode: "Kiss the Val"
2002	Son of the Beach	Marcia Clark	Episode: "Witness for the Prostitution"
2001—2004	Doc	Dr. Gwen Hall	Episodes: "Some Gave All: Part 1" and "Wake Up Call"
