= Nightmare as a Child =

- The Twilight Zone episode
- Episode no.: Season 1 Episode 29
- Directed by: Alvin Ganzer
- Written by: Rod Serling
- Production code: 173-3635
- Original air date: April 29, 1960

Guest appearances
- Janice Rule as Helen Foley; Terry Burnham as Markie; Shepperd Strudwick as Peter Selden; Michael Fox as Doctor; Suzanne Cupito (Morgan Brittany) as Little Girl (uncredited); Joseph V. Perry as Police Lieutenant

Episode chronology
← Previous "A Nice Place to Visit"	Next → "A Stop at Willoughby"
- The Twilight Zone (1959 TV series, season 1)

"Nightmare as a Child" is episode 29 of the American television anthology series The Twilight Zone. It originally aired on April 29, 1960, on CBS.

== Opening narration ==
Month of November, hot chocolate, and a small cameo of a child's face, imperfect only in its solemnity. And these are the improbable ingredients to a human emotion, an emotion, say, like—fear. But in a moment this woman, Helen Foley, will realize fear. She will understand what are the properties of terror. A little girl will lead her by the hand and walk with her into a nightmare.

== Plot ==
A schoolteacher named Helen Foley finds a strange and very serious little girl named Markie on the stairs outside her apartment. She is singing "Twinkle, twinkle, little star". The girl seems to know her and tries to jog her memory about a man she saw earlier that day.

The man arrives at Helen's door as Markie, frightened, runs out the back way. The man is Peter Selden, who explains that he worked for Helen's mother when Helen was a child and was the first to find her murdered mother's body. Helen had witnessed the crime but blocked it out. When she mentions Markie, Selden tells her that her nickname was Markie as a child and shows her an old photo of herself. The girl in the photo is identical to the girl Helen met.

When Selden leaves, Helen begins to recollect the night of the murder, and a man rushing toward her after murdering her mother, before running out of the room. Markie reappears, and tells Helen that she is Helen herself, and that she is there to force her to confront her memory of that night.

Selden suddenly returns and confesses to the murder. He tells Helen that her mother had discovered him cooking the books at their workplace and, despite his pleas, was going to report him to the police. Selden also says that he had been about to kill Helen that night as well, but could not because her screams had drawn other people to the apartment. He has since been "keeping tabs" on her because he knew one day she would recall the murder. Helen escapes and runs into the hallway and, after a struggle, Selden falls down the stairs to his death.

After talking to the police and returning to her apartment, Helen hears a little girl's voice singing the same tune as Markie had been. She investigates, and finds another girl sitting with her doll on the stairs in the same place where Markie had been. To Helen's relief, she doesn't recognize the girl. Helen tells the girl she has a lovely smile, and to never lose it.

== Closing narration ==
Miss Helen Foley, who has lived in night and who will wake up to morning. Miss Helen Foley, who took a dark spot from the tapestry of her life and rubbed it clean—then stepped back a few paces and got a good look at the Twilight Zone.

== Cast ==
- Janice Rule as Helen Foley
- Terry Burnham as Markie
- Shepperd Strudwick as Peter Selden
- Michael Fox as Doctor
- Suzanne Cupito as Little Girl (uncredited)
- Joseph V. Perry as Police Lieutenant

== Production notes ==
The episode almost certainly inspired 1964 film Marnie by Alfred Hitchcock. The main character is a woman named Marnie who as a little girl killed her mother’s customer to protect her and, traumatised, suppressed this memory.

Helen Foley was the name of a beloved teacher of Serling's at Binghamton High School, and the main performance theater at that school is named after her. The name Helen Foley is also used for the main character — also a school teacher — in the "It's a Good Life" segment of Twilight Zone: The Movie.

Suzanne Cupito, who would later find fame as Morgan Brittany, remained uncredited on-screen, despite having dialogue.
