= Apocalypse II: Revelation =

- Official DVD cover
- Directed by: André van Heerden
- Written by: Paul Lalonde and Peter Lalonde
- Produced by: Paul Lalonde; Peter Lalonde
- Starring: Jeff Fahey; Tony Nappo; Carol Alt; Leigh Lewis; Nick Mancuso
- Cinematography: George Tirl
- Edited by: Marvin Lawrence
- Music by: Gary Koftinoff
- Production companies: Jack Van Impe Ministries; John Hagee Ministries; Prophecy Partners Inc. Scorpio Pictures; This Week in Bible Prophecy
- Distributed by: Providence Entertainment; Cloud Ten Pictures
- Release date: May 7, 1999; (US)
- Running time: 98 min.
- Countries: United States; Canada
- Language: English
- Budget: $1,500,000 (Estimated)
- Box office: $206,626 (US)

Apocalypse II: Revelation is a 1999 Christian horror thriller film directed by André van Heerden. The film stars Jeff Fahey, and was written and produced by Paul Lalonde and Peter Lalonde. It is a sequel to Apocalypse and second installment of the Apocalypse film series. Like all other films in the franchise, Apocalypse II was produced and distributed by Cloud Ten Pictures.

Three months have passed since the events of the previous film. Franco Macalousso (Nick Mancuso) has convinced many of those left behind that he is the true Messiah. But is he?

Counter-terrorist expert Thorold Stone (Jeff Fahey) tries to put the pieces of his life together. His wife and daughter were among the millions who vanished in the Rapture. In the course of his investigation of an underground resistance movement, he uncovers a conspiracy that leads to the heart of the new world order. Stone throws in his lot with this group of rebel Christians, which includes journalist Helen Hannah played by actress Leigh Lewis, a computer engineer working for One Nation Earth (Tony Nappo), and a beautiful blind cynic (Carol Alt). The "Haters" find themselves in a race against time as the World Government distributes Virtual Reality headsets to every single person on Earth, to be activated on the Messiah's "Day of Wonders".

== Plot ==
Thorold Stone, a counterterrorist agent, is watching home video tapes of his wife and daughter, both of whom have vanished in the Rapture.

The next morning, Stone and his partner, David Nidd, track down and arrest a mysterious terrorist group known as The Haters. Stone orders that the group be taken to the nearest headquarters of O.N.E.—One Nation Earth, the world government opposed by The Haters. While being carted away, a woman named Selma Davis confronts Stone and slips him a disc she claims will reveal the truth about his wife's disappearance.

Stone and Nidd investigate a disturbance in a nearby building and are confronted by Len Parker, the manager of WNN (World News Network). Parker punishes the agents for disobeying orders by shooting them both, and leaves them for dead—displaying supernatural powers when he walks through the wall. Stone mysteriously wakes up to find he is still alive.

In another cell of the Christian Underground, Helen Hannah informs her group that their initial plan with the disc has failed, and O.N.E.'s exact goals remain obscure. A member named Cindy worries that the public will fail to rise up against O.N.E., since crowds cheered the execution of Hannah's boyfriend, Bronson Pearl, on national television. The group is also mystified by a pair of virtual reality headsets they have received by mail.

Meanwhile, at the O.N.E. Headquarters, various alleged Haters are being thrown into cells, half of which were denounced by their own families and sent for reeducation. Parker's agents inform him that Stone is alive and in possession of the disc. Furious, Parker orders a complete manhunt for Stone, then tortures Selma Davis.

Stone, on the run, turns to his friend Willie Spino (a computer expert) for help. He is able to persuade Spino that O.N.E. is not the benign organization it is widely believed to be, and that the so-called Haters know valuable information. Spino manages to hack into O.N.E.'s security system, but this alerts O.N.E. to their location. Desperate, Spino suggests they flee to his stepsister's house; said stepsister is revealed to be Helen Hannah, and her house is also her cell's hideout.

Spino discovers that the disc contains a powerful computer virus. The group realizes its use—O.N.E. has been sending VR headsets to everybody on Earth, to be activated on the upcoming Day of Wonders. On this day, the user will come face to face with the virtual Macalousso and will be forced to make one of two choices: Accept the mark of the beast or "allegiance" and accept Macalousso as God and he will fulfill the user's "heart's desires", or reject Macalousso and his mark, with the punishment being death by guillotine. This fulfills the prophecy in the Bible of Revelation 20:4: "And I saw thrones, and they sat upon them, and judgment was given unto them: and I saw the souls of them that were beheaded for the witness of Jesus, and for the word of God, and which had not worshipped the beast, neither his image, neither had received his mark upon their foreheads or in their hands; and they lived and reigned with Christ a thousand years." However, Stone is skeptical about the Christian Underground—he confronts Hannah about God's cruelty in taking millions hostage; still, Stone acknowledges O.N.E. as the greater evil and agrees to help upload the virus. Spino is able to sneak Stone into Headquarters by passing him off as a guard.

At midnight, the Day of Wonders begins. Cindy, tempted by curiosity, tries on the headset and encounters Franco Macalousso, the Leader of O.N.E. He presents himself as the Messiah, freeing Cindy from her blindness. Fooled, Cindy accepts the Mark of the Beast. She then persuades Spino, with whom she has begun a relationship, to take the Mark. Possessed, Spino and Cindy attempt to kill Hannah, who manages to flee. Hannah then infiltrates the Headquarters with the help of a secret ally—Ron Spalding, a converted guard.

Stone tries on the headset, so that the virus may enter O.N.E.'s virtual reality. Encountering Macalousso, Stone is almost fooled when he sees illusions of his wife and daughter. He suddenly has an epiphany and realises that Macalousso is the Antichrist. Furious at being rejected, Macalousso prepares to decapitate Stone on a guillotine, but Hannah and Spalding disable the computer running the headset just in time.

Parker, Spino, and Cindy arrive with a group of agents. Parker takes Helen, Spalding and Stone into a room where they join Davis, her daughter, and a young boy. Parker gives the Christians one last chance to renounce God, but meets refusal. As Parker leaves the room, Stone tells Selma that he is sorry and she forgives him. They all start to sing "Amazing Grace". Outside, the agents pull down a switch, revealing the room to be a giant furnace; yet, Parker is startled when they do not burn—God is protecting them. Parker decides to go into the furnace and kill them himself but when he opens the door, the fire immolates him and invades the entire building. The O.N.E. Headquarters burn down due to the rampaging furnace, killing many people, including Cindy—but leaving the Christians unharmed.

O.N.E. is temporarily weakened by the sabotage of Virtual Reality and the destruction of their Headquarters. An angered Macalousso swears to continue the fight: "They will not prevail against us!"

The film ends with Stone looking at a picture of his family. He knows they are safe.

== Cаst ==
- Jeff Fahey as Therald Stone
- Nick Mancuso as Franco Macalousso
- Carol Alt as Cindy Bolton
- Tony Nappo as Willie Spino
- Leigh Lewis as Helen Hannah
- David Roddis as Len Parker
- Patrick Gallagher as Jake Goss

== Reception ==
Christian website "Box Office Revolution" disliked the film and gave it only five of ten stars, stating: "Once again I ask, who's going to watch this movie? It has nothing going for it whatsoever. There is no plot and certainly no notable production quality. The casting is horrible. Most Christians are and should be offended by this nonsense. Once again, the world is laughing. This kind of junk reaches no one and only adds to the caricature of Christian film. But wait...there's still more of these..." Another Christian web site "Christian Spotlight on the Movies" liked the movie and gave it four out of five stars and wrote: "Revelation is an entirely Christian production, released by Cloud Ten Pictures and produced by Peter and Paul Lalonde. The acting and technical aspects of this sequel far exceed "Apocalypse". While still not on par with Hollywood-style productions, this unique Christian film studio based in Canada has great potential and is sure to produce even better quality as their experience and budget builds."

Apocalypse II: Revelation was nominated for one Golden Trailer Awards in the category of "Best Trailer—No Budget". The film was also nominated for one Golden Reel Award in the category of "Best Sound Editing – Direct to Video – Sound Editorial".
