= Jason Gould =

American actor (born 1966)

- Born: Jason Emanuel Gould; December 29, 1966 (age 59); New York City, U.S.
- Occupations: Actor; singer
- Years active: 1972–present
- Parent(s): Elliott Gould; Barbra Streisand
- Relatives: Roslyn Kind (aunt)

Jason Emanuel Gould (/ɡuːld/; born December 29, 1966) is an American actor and singer.

== Early life ==
Gould was born on December 29, 1966, in New York City, the only child of singer and actress Barbra Streisand and actor Elliott Gould. His parents separated in 1969 and divorced July 9, 1971. He is Jewish of Polish-Jewish, Ukrainian-Jewish, Lithuanian-Jewish and Russian-Jewish descent.

== Career ==
Gould appeared as Mike Cameron in the romantic comedy-drama film Say Anything... (1989) and the romantic drama film The Prince of Tides (1991) (which was directed by and starred his mother) but has seldom appeared in front of the camera since then.

In 1997, he made his West End theatre début in the drama play The Twilight of the Golds at the Arts Theatre in London; he played the part of David Gold, a theatre-designer.

Gould wrote, produced, and directed the short comedy film Inside Out (1997), playing Aaron in the story of the child of two celebrities who is outed by the tabloids. His father Elliott Gould played his father in the short film, and his half-brother Sam Gould played his brother. The short was later combined with other features for the compilation film Boys Life 3 (2000).

Gould has since focused on a singing career. He released the 2012 EP Jason Gould, with the single "Morning Prayer/Groove" the following year. Gould performed with his mother during her 2012 North American and 2013 European Barbra Live tour. The two recorded "How Deep Is the Ocean?" for her 2014 album Partners. Gould released the album Dangerous Man in 2017.

== Personal life ==
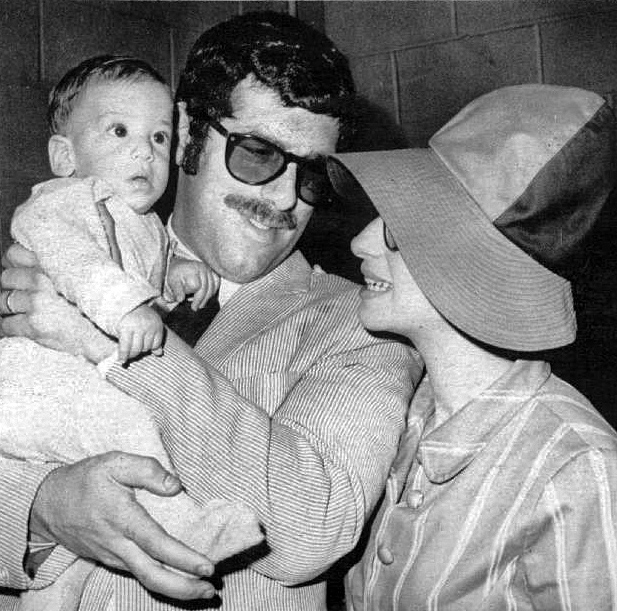
Gould with his parents Elliott Gould and Barbra Streisand in 1967

At the age of 21, Gould came out to his parents as gay. By 1991, he had been outed by tabloids. In an interview with The Advocate published on August 17, 1999, Streisand said:

I would never wish for my son to be anything but what he is. He is bright, kind, sensitive, caring, and a very conscientious and good person. He is a very gifted actor and filmmaker. What more could a parent ask for in their child? I have been truly blessed. Most parents feel that their child is particularly special, and I am no different. I have a wonderful son. My only wish for my son, Jason, is that he continues to experience a rich life of love, happiness, joy, and fulfillment, both creatively and personally.

== Filmography ==
Year	Title	Role	Notes
1972	Up the Sandbox	Young Boy	Uncredited
1989	Say Anything...	Mike Cameron	
1989	Listen to Me	Hinkelstein	
1989	The Big Picture	Carl Manknik	
1991	The Prince of Tides	Bernard Woodruff	
1996	Subterfuge	Alfred "Alfie" Slade	
1996	Inside Out	Aaron	Also, director, producer and screenwriter
2000	Boys Life 3	Aaron	Segment "Inside Out"

== Theatre work ==
Year	Title	Genre	Role	Theatre	Location
1997	The Twilight of the Golds	Drama	David Gold	Arts Theatre	London, England

== Discography ==
Year	Format	Title
2012	EP	Jason Gould
2017	CD	Dangerous Man
2021	EP	"Dark Grey Skies"
2024	EP	"Sacred Days"
2025	CD	"Where We Fall"

== Musical collaborations ==
Year	Format	Album	Song
2000	CD/DVD	Timeless	"Sing" (home video)
2013	CD/DVD	Back to Brooklyn	"Nature Boy" (solo) "How Deep Is the Ocean?" (live duet with Streisand) "Make Our Garden Grow" (ensemble)
2014	CD	Partners	"How Deep Is the Ocean" (studio duet with Streisand)
