= Cloud Ten Pictures =

Canadian film production and distribution company

Cloud 10 Pictures
- Type: Private
- Founded: 1994
- Founder: Peter and Paul LaLonde
- Defunct: 2011 (Most of its operations)
- Fate: Inactivity (Most of its operations)
- Headquarters: St. Catherines, Ontario, Canada
- Area served: Canada
- Key people: Peter and Paul LaLonde (chairmen)
- Owner: Cloud Ten Media
- Parent: Cloud Ten Media

Cloud Ten Pictures is a Canadian film production and distribution company located in St. Catharines, Ontario, who specialised in producing "end times" Christian films.

== History ==
Cloud Ten was formed by brothers Peter and Paul LaLonde in 1994. The Lalonde brothers self-financed the company's early films, which consisted of documentaries addressing Christian theological issues. Prior to forming Cloud Ten, the LaLonde brothers had found an audience in Christian Evangelical circles through their television program, This Week in Bible Prophecy.

The company's first feature film was Apocalypse, a low-budget thriller released in 1998. The company produced three more films in the Apocalypse Series, Revelation (1999), Tribulation (2000) and Judgment (2001).

In 2000, Cloud Ten Pictures released Left Behind: The Movie, based on the first book in the popular Left Behind book series, authored by Tim LaHaye and Jerry Jenkins. It was released into the video market on October 31. It ended up being named the "Best-Selling Title of the Year by an Independent Studio". Cloud Ten also produced two sequels based on the second book in the Left Behind book series, Left Behind: Tribulation Force (2002) and Left Behind: World at War (2005). Byron M. Jones, the then VP of Entertainment, states that "the pre-orders for Tribulation Force have outpaced those of the original LEFT BEHIND movie by almost 40%". Cloud Ten released Left Behind: World at War via a coordinated nationwide screening in over 3,200 churches (compared with a typical 1,700 screens in a nationwide theatrical release). The World at War release started a trend for Christian film church releases, and led Cloud Ten to launch its Church Cinema program. The founders, Peter and Paul Lalonde, were referred to as "The Fabulous LaLonde Brothers" in a profile by GQ magazine.

Cloud Ten, with the Left Behind films, was in legal disputes with both their co-producers, Namesake Entertainment, and one of the authors of the popular book series, Tim LaHaye. The dispute with LaHaye resulted in a series of legal actions, originally filed in 2000, that were settled in July 2008. The terms of the settlement are confidential, but Cloud Ten Pictures has stated that Tim Lahaye has the rights for one year to try to remake the Left Behind films. If he does not exercise those rights within one year, Cloud Ten Pictures will again have the rights to make Left Behind movies. As of October 1, 2010, the rights to the Left Behind film series have officially been restored to Cloud Ten Pictures, and the company is planning a remake of the series. Cloud Ten was hoping to start development on the remake by late 2011.

Cloud Ten released three films in 2008: Smuggler's Ransom, Genius Club and Saving God. Both Smuggler's Ransom and Genius Club were acquired for distribution. Saving God is a co-production with Clear Entertainment and stars Ving Rhames, Ricardo Chavira and Dean McDermott. They also distributed The River Within in 2009.

== Movies ==
=== Documentaries ===
- Left Behind Docudrama (1994/1996 recut)
- Final Warning (1995)
- Startling Proofs (1995)
- Last Days: Hype or Hope? (1996)
- The Mark of the Beast (1997)
- Vanished (1999)
- The Gospel of the Antichrist: Exposed
- Racing to the End of Time (formerly: 2000 AD: Are You Ready?)
- Shadow Government (2009)
- Dragons or Dinosaurs? (2010)
- 12 Biggest Lies (2010)

=== Films ===
#	Film	Theatrical release	Church release	DVD release	Blu-ray release
1	Apocalypse	September 27, 1998	Released	Released	—
2	Apocalypse II: Revelation	May 7, 1999	TBA	1999	—
3	Apocalypse III: Tribulation	January 14, 2000	Released	Released	—
4	Left Behind: The Movie	February 2, 2001	—	October 29, 2000	—
5	Apocalypse IV: Judgment	March 6, 2001	—	March 16, 2001	—
6	Left Behind II: Tribulation Force	October 29, 2002	December 31, 2002	October 29, 2002	—
7	Waterproof	—	Released	Released	—
8	The Miracle of the Cards		Released	Released	—
9	Deceived	—	—	Released	—
10	Left Behind: World at War	October 21, 2005	October 18, 2005	October 25, 2005	—
11	Smuggler's Ransom	—	June 6, 2008	June 10, 2008	—
12	Treasure Blind	—	—	Released 2008	—
13	The Genius Club	October 27, 2006	—	September 2008	—
14	Saving God	—	October 6, 2008	October 11, 2008	October 11, 2008
15	The River Within	—	—	November 10, 2009	—
16	Dangerous Calling	—	—	Released 2010	—

== Abandoned projects ==
In 2003, the company started pre-production on a movie called End Game. The movie was supposed to be their first film planned to have a wide theatrical release. Eleven pages of the shooting script went up on the official website, but production came to a halt shortly after.

In mid-June 2003, production was supposed to begin on an animated remake of their film Left Behind: The Movie. Cloud Ten's VP of films, André van Heerden, said, "the storyline will be even closer to the original books than a live-action movie can be simply because of the freedom animation gives." This film was not made.

Shortly after the release of Left Behind: World at War, a television show based on Left Behind was in the planning stages for airing on the PAX television network. Planning for the television show also includes casting calls in the United States and Canada, but creative differences on the direction of the proposed television series led Cloud Ten Pictures to abandon the project.

== Defunct ==
Cloud Ten Pictures CEO Paul Lalonde opened the new Christian production company Stoney Lake Entertainment, which produced the Left Behind (2014 film) remake, a film that was originally going to be produced by Cloud Ten Pictures.
