= Red Scorpion 2 =

1994 film directed by Michael Kennedy

- Promotional release poster
- Directed by: Michael Kennedy
- Written by: Troy Bolotnick; Barry Victor; Straw Weisman; Arne Olsen (characters)
- Produced by: Robert K. MacLean; Jack Abramoff; Robert Abramoff; Dale A. Andrews; George G. Braunstein; Mary Eilts; Michele White
- Starring: Matt McColm; John Savage; Jennifer Rubin; Michael Ironside
- Edited by: Gary Zubeck
- Music by: George Blondheim
- Production companies: August Entertainment; Northwood Pictures; Western International Communications
- Distributed by: Malofilm Video (Canada); MCA/Universal Home Video (U.S.)
- Release date: April 27, 1995; (U.S.)
- Running time: 95 minutes
- Countries: Canada; United States
- Language: English

Red Scorpion 2 is a 1994 Canadian–American action film directed by Michael Kennedy, starring Matt McColm, John Savage, Jennifer Rubin and Michael Ironside. The film is a sequel to the 1988 film Red Scorpion, and is the second installment in the Red Scorpion film series, although the cast is different and the story largely unrelated. It pits a ragtag commando unit against a neo-Nazi group, whose leader believes that the legendary Spear of Destiny can seal his ascent to power.

== Plot ==
Disenfranchised white youths known as skinheads are attacking racial minorities in the U.S. A government investigator traces them to a wealthy neo-Nazi businessman, Andrew Kendrick, who is secretly bankrolling the attacks, while preaching a non-violent message to his wider following. Nick Stone is an agent with the National Security Agency who wants to retire after his last undercover job resulted in the death of a fellow agent. His boss Col. West convinces him to take on one last mission: take down Kendrick. Nick is assigned a team composed of Commander Sam Guinness, Vince D'Angelo, a womanizing computer expert from Hollywood, Billy Ryan, a redneck sharpshooter, Joe Nakamura and Winston "Mad Dog" Powell, a disgraced Detroit cop.

The group's first assignment is to infiltrate a warehouse owned by Kendrick which may be housing the Spear of Destiny, an ancient spear used in the crucifixion of Jesus and believed by Kendrick to give him ultimate power. The team does not show the requite, resulting in Nakamura's death and failure to recover the spear. West's boss, Colonel Gregori, takes the team on a bonding trip to his cabin in the pacific Northwest. Satisfied with their progress, Gregori names them the "Red Scorpions".

A second infiltration of Kendrick's network is attempted: Ryan poses as a racist southerner to ingratiate himself to Kendrick, and gets invited to the latter's training camp. However, after he sleeps with Kendrick's female assistant Donna, the game is up and Ryan gets thrown in a dungeon. Stone and Guinness pose as potential benefactors to rejoin Ryan inside the enemy compound. They are soon discovered, but they manage to get the rest of the Red Scorpions inside for the final assault, during which Kendrick, Donna and their key personnel find their demise.

== Cast ==
- Matt McColm as Nick Stone
- John Savage as Andrew Kendrick
- Jennifer Rubin as Sam Guinness
- Paul Ben-Victor as Vince D'Angelo
- Michael Covert as Billy Ryan
- Réal Andrews as Winston "Mad Dog" Powell
- Duncan Fraser as Mr. Benjamin
- George Touliatos as Gregori
- Michael Ironside as Colonel West
- Vladimir Kulich as Hans
- Suki Kaiser as Donna
- Jerry Wasserman as Steinberg
- Tong Lung as Joe
- Anthony Stamboulieh as Abdu
- Samantha Schubert as Renee
- Wren Roberts as Club Attack Leader

== Production ==
=== Development and writing ===
After the first film did well in international markets, its producer Jack Abramoff was approached by Gregory Cascante of August Entertainment with an offer to partner on a sequel. Abramoff started prospecting in various countries, including Malaysia, to find the best financing opportunities for future productions. Director Joseph Zito was briefly in talks to return when the project was at an informal stage, but quickly moved on. Still hoping to entice Lundgren to return, the producers commissioned three iterations of a story featuring his character from the original, Nikolai. The first was written by Dennis Hackin. The second, which introduced a Malaysian setting, was authored by Clay Walker. A third one by Malcolm Mowbray re-used elements of previous drafts.

In 1992, the project was repackaged as a pair of movies starring a new leading man, former stuntman Matt McColm. The first, An Act of Courage, would be shot in Malaysia starting in August or September of that year, by newcomer writer/director William Vigil. Local company UA Entertainment would help come up with a hefty $20–25 million budget. McColm was to play a martial arts star captured by child fans who want him to defend their village against drug traffickers. Miss Malaysia 1991, Samantha Schubert, was hired as McColm's love interest. Kuala Lumpur, Tioman Island and Taman Negara National Park were considered as locations. A further Malaysian production, False Profit, was a possibility in the future, as was a collaboration with Michelle Yeoh.

Meanwhile, the original film was rebooted as Red Scorpion 2: The Spear of Destiny, to begin filming in Germany in November 1992, under producer Lance Hool and director Michael Schroeder. To fit the European setting, Abramoff crafted a new pitch based on the fabled artefact, which was turned into a screenplay by Vigil. McColm's character was then a U.S. Army Special Forces staff sergeant named Kurt Hawkins. However, the announced dates came and went without either film getting made. After sorting out some copyright issues and more rewrites, Red Scorpion 2 finally went into production in Canada, where Cascante had professional connections and tax breaks were enticing. Shubert was brought onto the film, albeit in a minor role.

=== Filming ===
Photography was originally slated to begin on October 12, 1993, but effectively began on October 18 and concluded on November 23. According to The Hollywood Reporter, the movie benefited from an US$8 million budget. It was shot in Vancouver, British Columbia, as well as surrounding areas such as Britannia Bay, where the SS Prince George was moored, and the Capilano River Regional Park. Some interiors were shot at a studio set up inside an old brewery at Vine and 12th, which at the time of filming was operated by Spelling Canada. Post-production extended into spring 1994 and took place in Los Angeles, with Canadian producer Robert K. MacLean relocating there to oversee it.

== Music ==
=== Soundtrack ===
The film's soundtrack was supervised by the film music division of S.L. Feldman and Associates, a leading booking agency in Canada. Up and coming Canadian rock band Junkhouse, who had just released their first album through Sony Music, were cast as the house band of the fictional Los Angeles nightclub.

== Release ==
=== Pre-release ===
The film was screened for industry professionals at the Cannes Film Market on May 17, 1994.

=== Theatrical ===
The film was released theatrically in some international markets. In Japan, where it premiered on February 4, 1995, through Victor Entertainment. In South Korea, it premiered on August 26, 1995.

=== Television ===
In the U.S., the film premiered on premium cable channel HBO on April 27, 1995. It was billed as an "HBO World Premiere", although the term was merely a marketing gimmick employed by the broadcaster, and the film had already been seen in other markets, such as the U.K. (see below).

=== Home media ===
Red Scorpion 2 arrived on Canadian and U.S. VHS on February 6, 1996. In Canada, the film was distributed by Norstar Entertainment, through an output deal with Malofilm Video. In the U.S., the film was distributed by Shapiro-Glickenhaus Entertainment through an output deal with MCA/Universal Home Video. MCA/Universal also issued it on LaserDisc on February 13, 1996. The film's North American release was preceded by its bow in the U.K., where the tape was distributed by First Independent on November 21, 1994. There is no domestic DVD release on record.

== Reception ==
=== Critical response ===
Red Scorpion 2 has received mostly negative reviews. Ballantine Books' Video Movie Guide was most positive, finding that the film, "a compact retread of The Dirty Dozen, is far better than its predecessor", while "action scenes are well-handled." Paul Castles of the British Gloucester Citizen assessed it as a "[b]reathless and bloody actioner". Robert Pardi of The Motion Picture Guide delivered a mixed verdict: "With state-of-the-art demolition, expertly choreographed battle scenes, and enough weaponry for a military garage sale, this special-forces flick feeds hunger for action but suffers a story line that's hard to swallow". He also criticized antagonists that never rose above an "unsubtle caricature".

David Stratton of trade publication Variety was unimpressed, calling the film "[a] routine actioner that covers familiar ground" and "a sequel that doesn't aim high", although he granted that its setpieces might keep the action crowd "moderately happy". VideoHound's Golden Movie Retriever commented: "Another Dirty Dozen rip-off finds your average ethnically mixed good guys brought together by a government agency". The British Film Institute's magazine Sight and Sound dismissed a "formulaic action adventure." LaserDisc News concurred, finding that "the performances are bland and the narrative is a grind." Susan King of Los Angeles Times summed up the film as a "glum thriller".
