= We're Not Married! =

1952 film by Edmund Goulding

- Original film poster
- Directed by: Edmund Goulding
- Screenplay by: Nunnally Johnson
- Adaptation by: Dwight Taylor
- Based on: If I Could Remarry unpublished work by Gina Kaus; Jay Dratler
- Produced by: Nunnally Johnson
- Starring: Ginger Rogers; Fred Allen; Victor Moore; Marilyn Monroe; David Wayne; Eve Arden; Paul Douglas; Eddie Bracken; Mitzi Gaynor; Zsa Zsa Gabor; Louis Calhern
- Cinematography: Leo Tover
- Edited by: Louis R. Loeffler
- Music by: Cyril Mockridge
- Production company: 20th Century Fox
- Distributed by: 20th Century Fox
- Release date: July 11, 1952
- Running time: 85 minutes
- Country: United States
- Language: English
- Box office: $2 million (US rentals)

We're Not Married! is a 1952 American anthology romantic comedy film directed by Edmund Goulding. It was released by 20th Century Fox.

The screenplay was written by Nunnally Johnson, while the story was adapted by Dwight Taylor from Gina Kaus's and Jay Dratler's unpublished work "If I Could Remarry".

The film stars Ginger Rogers, Fred Allen, Victor Moore, Marilyn Monroe, David Wayne, Eve Arden, Paul Douglas, Eddie Bracken, and Mitzi Gaynor. Co-stars include Louis Calhern, Zsa Zsa Gabor, James Gleason, Paul Stewart, and Jane Darwell.

== Plot ==
When elderly Mr. Bush is appointed justice of the peace, he starts marrying couples on Christmas Eve. However, his appointment takes effect on the first of January. Later, this issue becomes known when one of the six couples he married files for divorce. To avoid a bigger scandal, the remaining five couples are informed that they are not really married. The film then shows how the other couples react to the news.

Steve and Ramona Gladwyn are a husband-and-wife radio team whose on-air loving behavior on their show "Breakfast with the Glad Gladwyns" conceals the fact that they cannot stand each other. However, they do not want to lose their large salaries. When they arrive outside the marriage license bureau, they encounter a happy couple leaving. The sight makes Steve reconsider his relationship with Ramona, then she does too.

The second couple is Jeff and Annabel Norris. Annabel has just won the "Mrs. Mississippi" pageant. Jeff is fed up with taking care of their child, while Annabel and her manager Duffy are out preparing to compete for the title of "Mrs. America". Jeff is delighted at the prospect of getting Annabel back when he learns they are not married. He sees to it that she loses her title, but in the end is pleased when his now-fiancée wins the "Miss Mississippi" contest.

Bush remembers Hector and Katie Woodruff talking constantly, but they have now run out of things to say to each other. When Hector gets the letter from the Governor's office, he imagines seeing all his gorgeous girlfriends again but then realises how much a playboy life would cost and burns the letter before Katie sees it.

Kind millionaire Freddie Melrose is married to a young gold-digger named Eve. When Freddie goes on a business trip, she suggests she'll fly that evening to meet him at his hotel, but instead sets him up. Another woman shows up instead, followed shortly afterward by three men who witness his fake adultery. Eve and her attorney, Stone, inform Freddie that while Eve is entitled by law to half his assets in a divorce, they want much more. Her attornies threaten him with criminal charges. Bush's letter arrives just in time to save him. Freddie then breaks the news to Eve that they were never legally married.

Lastly, a young soldier Wilson "Willie" Fisher is about to be shipped out to Hawaii and the "Asiatic-Pacific Theater." At the train station, his wife Patsy arrives late and just has time to tell him she is pregnant before his train leaves. He is unable to tell her that they are not married. He sends her a telegram, urging her to meet him at the port. There, he goes AWOL in order to try to marry her, while dodging two MPs. However, he is caught and thrown in the brig, and his ship sets sail. Fortunately, a military chaplain notices an upset Patsy and manages to extract the story from her. He then arranges for her and Willie to get married by radio. The ending is all of the couples get remarried except for Mr. and Mrs. Melrose.

== Cast ==
- Victor Moore as Melvin Bush, Justice of the Peace
- Ginger Rogers as Ramona Gladwyn
- Fred Allen as Steve Gladwyn
- Marilyn Monroe as Annabel Jones Norris
- David Wayne as Jeff Norris
- Eve Arden as Katie Woodruff
- Paul Douglas as Hector Woodruff
- Eddie Bracken as Willie Fisher
- Helene Stanley as Mary
- Mitzi Gaynor as Patricia 'Patsy' Reynolds Fisher
- Louis Calhern as Freddie Melrose
- Zsa Zsa Gabor as Eve Melrose
- James Gleason as Duffy
- Paul Stewart as Attorney Stone
- Jane Darwell as Mrs. Bush
- Dabbs Greer as Beauty Contest Spectator (Uncredited)
- Lee Marvin as Pinky
- Gloria Talbott as Girl in dream sequence
- Richard Buckley as the radio producer Mr. H.D. Graves

== Reception ==
On the review aggregator website Rotten Tomatoes, 40% of 5 critics' reviews are positive.

Bosley Crowther of The New York Times wrote: "it must be said for Mr. Johnson and Mr. Goulding that they cut their capers well and came forth with a tailored entertainment that is one of the snappiest of the year." Crowther's favorite segment "most particularly because of the droll demonstration of confusion and beaming triumph that Louis Calhern gives—(is) the little drama in which a Texas millionaire confounds a scheming wife and her attorney who are trying to skin him with the old Army game. In this one, Mr. Calhern is delicious as he helplessly blinks and squirms through the obvious embarrassments of a frame-up and the subsequent bludgeonings of the kill. And then he is beautifully nimble as he finds his ace card and turns upon his relentless harassers..."

== Soundtrack ==
Song	Performer(s)	Note(s)
"Cuddles"	Sung by the lunch room counter man	Written by Edmund Goulding
"The Wedding March"	Played during the opening credits	From A Midsummer Night's Dream (Music by Felix Mendelssohn-Bartholdy)
"The First Noel"	Sung during the opening scene	-
"Silent Night, Holy Night"	Sung by the carolers when the Gladwyns get married	Music by Franz Gruber; Lyrics by Joseph Mohr
"Waltz from 'Coppélia'"	Played after Ramona turns on the light while getting up	Music by Léo Delibes
"Home, Sweet Home"	Played on the organ at the beginning of the radio show	Music by Henry Bishop
"Sweet and Lovely"	Played during the bathing beauty contest	Written by Gus Arnheim, Harry Tobias and Neil Moret (as Jules LeMare)
"Baby Face"	Played after Annabel is handed the trophy	Music by Harry Akst
"Perfidia"	Played on the radio when Hector is telling Katie about the Latin Quarter	Written by Alberto Domínguez
"Wien, Wien, nur du allein"	Played during the Mr. and Mrs. Melrose episode	Written by Rudolf Sieczyński
