= Susan Anspach =

American actress (1942–2018)

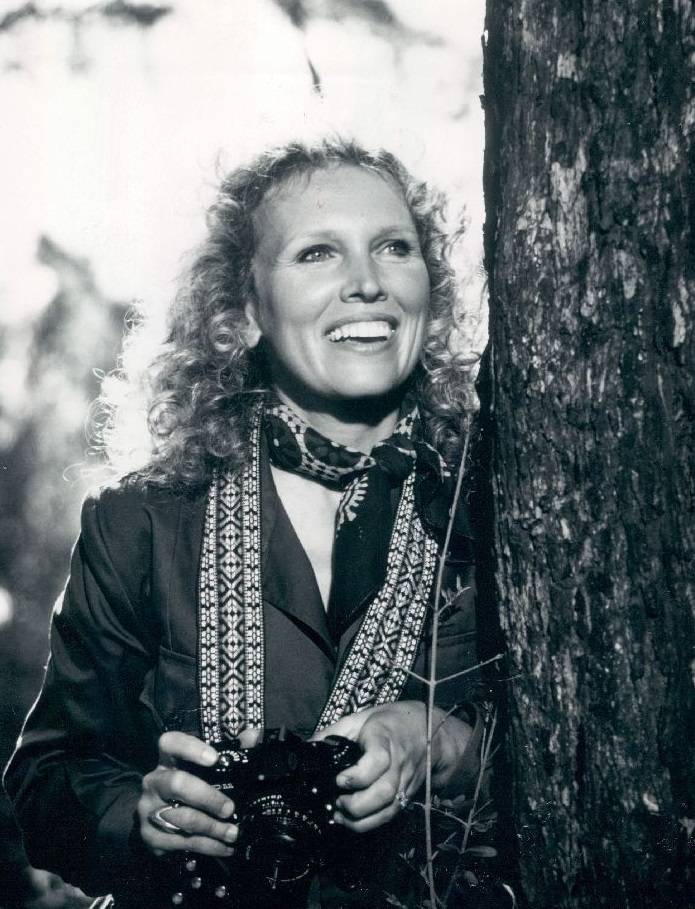
- Anspach in 1979
- Born: Susan Florence Anspach; November 23, 1942; New York City, New York U.S.
- Died: April 2, 2018 (aged 75); Los Angeles, California, U.S.
- Occupation: Actress
- Years active: 1964–2011
- Spouses: Mark Goddard (m. 1970; div. 1978) Sherwood Ball (m. 1982; div. 1988)
- Children: 2

Susan Florence Anspach (ONS-bok ; November 23, 1942 – April 2, 2018) was an American stage, film and television actress who had roles in films during the 1970s and 1980s such as Five Easy Pieces (1970), Play It Again, Sam (1972), Blume in Love (1973), Montenegro (1981), Blue Monkey (1987), and Blood Red (1989).

== Early life ==
Anspach was born and raised in Queens, New York City. Her mother was Gertrude (née Kehoe), a secretary and former singer of Scottish and Irish ancestry. Her father was Renald Anspach, a World War II Army veteran and later factory worker, who was of German-Jewish and English descent. The couple met at the 1939 New York World's Fair. Anspach's grandfather had disapproved of the marriage and disowned his son. Anspach was raised by her great-aunt until Anspach was six, when her aunt died. She went back to live with her parents in what grew to be an abusive home; she ran away at age 15. With the help of a Roman Catholic organization, she moved in with a family in Harlem.

Anspach graduated from William Cullen Bryant High School in Long Island City in 1960. She received a full scholarship to the Catholic University of America in Washington, DC. She studied music and drama. Anspach made her professional debut in Thornton Wilder's one-act play Pullman Car Hiawatha at a summer theater in Maryland. After college, she moved back to New York City.

== Career ==
Anspach starred in several Broadway and off-Broadway shows, including as Sheila, the female lead in the musical Hair. The production ran for 45 performances at the Cheetah Theatre. She was in a play with Al Pacino while at the Actors Studio. She starred off-Broadway in 1965 in A View from the Bridge with Robert Duvall, Jon Voight, and Dustin Hoffman.

Anspach first came to prominence in the 1970 film Five Easy Pieces, directed by Bob Rafelson and starring Jack Nicholson. Vincent Canby of The New York Times called her "one of America's most charming and talented actresses". She followed this with a supporting role in Woody Allen's Play It Again, Sam (1972) and a more prominent role in Paul Mazursky's romantic comedy Blume in Love (1973), alongside George Segal and Kris Kristofferson.

Anspach originally was cast in the role of country singer Barbara Jean in the 1975 film Nashville, but her salary request exceeded the ensemble film's budget; she was replaced by Ronee Blakley.

In her film career, Anspach starred in 19 features and eight television movies and also was featured in two series, The Yellow Rose and The Slap Maxwell Story (with Dabney Coleman). She guest-starred in the NBC romantic anthology series Love Story in 1973, in the episode "All My Tomorrows".

Anspach provided backing vocals on Van Dyke's Deal Me In album that was released in 1977.

== Personal life ==
Anspach was raised in the Catholic faith of her mother. She said that the church and her psychoanalyst were her "parents" for close to 10 years of her youth.

Anspach had a daughter, Catherine Curry (born October 15, 1968) with fellow Hair cast member Steve Curry. She had a son, Caleb Goddard (born September 26, 1970), with Jack Nicholson. She married actor Mark Goddard in June 1970 and divorced him in October 1978. Goddard adopted both children.

Anspach married musician Sherwood Ball (son of musician-entrepreneur Ernie Ball) in 1982 and divorced him in 1988.

=== Activism ===
Anspach marched with United Farm Workers head Cesar Chavez. She protested against the apartheid system of South Africa. Anspach also advocated for human rights in Central America.

=== Death ===
Anspach died from heart failure on April 2, 2018, aged 75, in her Los Angeles home.

== Filmography ==
=== Film ===
Year	Title	Role	Notes	Ref.
1970	The Landlord	Susan Enders	Directed by Hal Ashby	
1970	Five Easy Pieces	Catherine Van Oost	Directed, produced, and story by Bob Rafelson	
1972	Play It Again, Sam	Nancy	Directed by Herbert Ross; Based on the play of the same name by Woody Allen and the screenplay by Allen	
1973	Blume in Love	Nina Blume	Directed, written, and produced by Paul Mazursky	
1978	The Big Fix	Lila	Comedy–drama film directed by Jeremy Kagan; Based on the novel of the same name by Roger L. Simon and screenplay by Simon.	
1979	Running	Janet	Sports drama film directed by Steven Hilliard Stern	
1981	The Devil and Max Devlin	Penny Hart	Fantasy–comedy film directed by Steven Hilliard Stern	
1981	Gas	Jane Beardsley	Canadian comedy film directed by Les Rose	
1981	Montenegro	Marilyn Jordan	Swedish black comedy film by Serbian director Dušan Makavejev; Also known as Montenegro – Or Pigs and Pearls	
1984	Misunderstood	Lily	Drama film directed by Jerry Schatzberg; Based on the 1869 novel Misunderstood by Florence Montgomery; Previously been adapted as the 1966 Italian film Incompreso	
1987	Blue Monkey	Dr. Judith Glass	Horror film directed by William Fruet	
1987	Heaven and Earth	Karen McKeon		
1988	Into the Fire	Rosalind Winfield	Thriller film directed by Graeme Campbell	
1989	The Rutanga Tapes	Kate Simpson		
1989	Blood Red	Widow	Drama film directed by Peter Masterson	
1989	Back to Back	Madeline Hix		
2009	Wild About Harry	Martha	Drama film directed by Gwen Wynne and co-written by Wynne & Mary Beth Fielder	
2011	Inversion	Edna Boswell	(final film role)	

=== Television ===
Year	Title	Role	Notes	Ref.
1964	The Nurses	Harriet Ravensel	Episode: "So Some Girls Play the Cello" (S 3:Ep 10); Also known as The Doctors and the Nurses	
1965	The Patty Duke Show	Susan	Episode: "Will the Real Sammy Davis Please Hang Up?" (S 2:Ep 25)	
1965	The Defenders	Jackie Dowling	Episode: "A Matter of Law and Disorder" (S 4:Ep 26)	
1965	The Patty Duke Show	Susan	Episode: "Cathy, the Rebel" (S 2:Ep 31)	
1965	The Nurses	Leora	Episode: "The Heroine" (S 3:Ep 29); Also known as The Doctors and the Nurses	
1966	The Journey of the Fifth Horse	Miss Gruboy / Elizaveta	Made-for-TV-Movie directed by Larry Arrick and Earl Dawson	
1969	Judd, for the Defense	Nan Dawes	Episode: "Runaway" (S 2:Ep 23)	
1973	Love Story	Lee McKinley	Episode: "All My Tomorrows" (S 1:Ep 2)	
1975	For the Use of the Hall	Terry	Made-for-TV-Movie directed by Lee Grant	
1976	McMillan & Wife	Lt. Kit Boone	Episode: "Point of Law" (S 5:Ep 7)	
1976	I Want to Keep My Baby!	Donna Jo Martelli	Made-for-TV-Movie directed by Jerry Thorpe	
1976	The Secret Life of John Chapman	Wilma	Made-for-TV-Movie directed by David Lowell Rich; Based on Appleseed: The Life and Legacy of John Chapman by John R. Coleman	
1977	Rosetti and Ryan	Beverly Dresden	Episode: "Men Who Love Women" (Pilot)	
1977	Mad Bull	Christina Sebastiani	Made-for-TV-Movie directed by Walter Doniger and Len Steckler	
1979	The Last Giraffe	Betty Leslie-Melville	Made-for-TV-Movie directed by Jack Couffer; Based on Raising Daisy Rothschild by Leslie-Melville	
1980	Portrait of an Escort	Jordan West	Made-for-TV-Movie directed by Steven Hilliard Stern	
1982	The First Time	Lucy Dillon	Made-for-TV-Movie directed by Noel Nosseck	
1982	Deadly Encounter	Chris Butler	Made-for-TV-Movie directed by William A. Graham	
1983	The Yellow Rose	Grace McKenzie	9 episodes (regular cast, one season)	
1984	Gone Are the Dayes	Phyllis Daye	Made-for-TV-Movie directed by Gabrielle Beaumont	
1986	The Hitchhiker	Claudia Reynolds	Episode: "Dead Man's Curve" (S 3:Ep 8)	
1989	Murder, She Wrote	Lois Fricksey	Episode: "Dead Letter" (S 6:Ep 6)	
2002	Dancing at the Harvest Moon	Julia	Made-for-TV-Movie directed Bobby Roth	
