= Spot Marks the X =

- Written by: Michael Jenning
- Directed by: Mark Rosman
- Starring: Mike the Dog; Barret Oliver; Natalie Gregory; Richard B. Shull; Vin Dunlop; Jerry Wasserman; Geoffrey Lewis
- Theme music composer: Patrick Williams
- Country of origin: United States
- Original language: English

Production
- Producer: Gregory Harrison
- Editor: Michael A. Stevenson
- Running time: 90 minutes

Original release
- Network: Disney Channel
- Release: October 18, 1986

Spot Marks the X is a 1986 American crime comedy television film that starred Mike the Dog (from Down and Out in Beverly Hills) as Capone/Astro, Barret Oliver (from The Neverending Story, Frankenweenie, D.A.R.Y.L., and Cocoon) as Ken, and Natalie Gregory (from Alice in Wonderland (1985 version), Oliver & Company, and Cranium Command) as Kathy, who, unlike her role as Alice in the aforementioned 1985 version, is seen with her real hair in this movie, which is brunette. It was produced by Gregory Harrison's production company, The Catalina Production Group, Ltd. in association with Walt Disney Television.

The film originally aired on October 18, 1986, on The Disney Channel, then a premium cable TV channel. Because of this, it originally aired without commercials. It would later air on May 17, 1987, on ABC in a 2-hour format as part of the Disney Sunday Movie. It also aired in a 2-part format on that show, with part 1 airing on July 3, 1988, and part 2 airing the following Sunday. Filmed on location in Vancouver, British Columbia, Canada from early-mid 1986. According to the book How I Broke Into Hollywood: Success Stories from the Trenches, director Mark Rosman was about to begin work on this movie in early 1985, shortly after finishing up The Blue Yonder. But then the 2-week writers' strike, which demanded more money for home video sales, occurred. This movie was one of three different Disney Channel Original Movies directed by Mark Rosman, the other two were The Blue Yonder (1985) and Life-Size (2000). In addition, Rosman has also directed episodes of two Disney Channel Original Series' in Even Stevens and Lizzie McGuire. He also directed Hilary Duff in A Cinderella Story and The Perfect Man.

== Plot ==
Following a bank robbery, three men are in a car (Beevis, Vic Dunlop; Elvis, Jerry Wasserman; and the gang's leader Doc Ross, David Huddleston) trying to evade the cops. Also inside the car is a Dog named Astro (Mike the Dog, but initially known here as "Capone"), when the car suddenly gets stuck in Shadow Park. The men and the dog then get out of the car, and bury the money, but not before Ross gets apprehended by the police, who also take Capone into their care. Three months later, Doc Ross is in jail awaiting trial and Capone is sent to an animal shelter. Elvis and Beevis attempt to free Capone in order to unearth the stolen money, but their attempt is thwarted when they fear attracting attention. Capone is in a special section of the animal shelter that cares for dogs of convicts. Capone's cage breaks and he wanders out, and gets found by a janitor who places him into the standard adoption kennels.

At an Elementary school are a boy named Ken Miller (Barret Oliver), and a girl named Kathy (Natalie Gregory). Although Kathy is his best friend, she sometimes come off as a huge pain. After-school, Kathy meets up with Ken at the baseball park to chat with him for a while. Meanwhile, Ross meets up with his lawyer at the county jail. Ross becomes furious when he learns that his dog has broken out of the animal shelter. Capone has managed to stumble onto Ken's house, much to Ken's surprise and delight. After playing with him for a while, he decides to name him Astro (unaware that his name was Capone). Kathy then shows up, and also grows a fondness for Ken's new dog. The two then spend a whole day with Astro.

The next day, Kathy begins to suspect something odd about Astro, whom at night has been getting nightmares of the robberies and Doc shouting "Quiet, Capone, quiet"!. One the day that Ross is sent to trial, a fight distracts the guards, and he flees. Meanwhile, Ken and Kathy spend some time trying to train Astro to change his behavior, but with no such luck. They also discover that he has a thing for pine trees. The Dog catcher then informs Ken's parents the truth about Astro. Ken, Kathy, and Astro also overhear this.

During a game of pool with Elvis, Ross insists that they go back to Shadow Park, but Elvis refuses, because they've dug there long enough. Meanwhile, Ken, Kathy, and Astro, find themselves by there, and to their surprise, Astro manages to fetch the bone, when suddenly, the Dog runs off to Shadow Park, and Ken and Kathy chase after him. When they find him, by a tree Kathy squeals in delight upon finding out that inside the patch beside it is money. Kathy insists that they split it 50-50. Suddenly, they hear Elvis and Ross and try to get away from him. The three of them then go to a boutique to do some shopping with the cash that they have just found.

Afterwards, Ken notices a small slip of paper with the words "Tim Ak Bak" on it. Ken immediately assumes that it says "Timberlake Bank". Kathy then reminds Ken of when his parents came over for dinner one time, and that everyone was talking about a bank robbery three months ago. It soon comes to their attention that the money was stolen. Ken and Kathy then go to a local library, and upon doing some research through a microfilm reader, they find out that the guys in the forest made the headlines, and that they allegedly stole $250,000. Ken and Kathy only found part of it.

Ken and Kathy then see the cops, and Kathy tries to create a distraction by talking to the cops, when suddenly, in an attempt to avoid the Dog catcher, Astro runs over to the trousers of an officer, and bites it off upon seeing the handcuffs. The Dog then runs away, as once again, Ken and Kathy hurry to chase it. Ken sees Neal, and uses him as an attempt to distract the Dog Catcher so that Astro would not get caught.

Back in the forest, Ken and Kathy, with the help of Astro, manage to find the rest of the money. They then head back to the boutique to give Astro a new look so that he will not get caught. Meanwhile, Beevis, Elvis, and Ross find Ken's home (while Ken's parents are away), as they break in. The kids and Astro see the Dog Catcher, and they make up the story that they traded him. The kids and the Dog arrive back at Ken's house, when suddenly, the kids are distracted by the sprinklers, causing the colors on Astro to fade away. They manage to flee, and meet up with Neal, as Ken gets him to lock the gate to his house. Beevis, with the help of Elvis, makes it over the fence, but is hit in the stomach by a ball from Neal's batting machine.

After fleeing for a while, the kids and the Dog find themselves inside Saul's backyard. They then see the bad guys, and flee through the other door. They make it back home and try to hide the money, and tell the parents about Astro, when the Dog Catcher suddenly comes in. Unfortunately, the Dog gets taken in, and it seems that all hope is lost. As Ken and Kathy attempt to get Astro back, Ken's parents are shocked when they find out that one of the presents is money. The kids arrive in Shadow Mountain, and they look on as Dodge (Richard B. Shull) arrests the crooks. Just as Ross thinks he's back with Astro, the kids find him, and command him to come back to them. Ross then orders the kids to hand over the bags of money when suddenly, Astro jumps over and attacks him. Ross tries to shoot him, but the kids beg him not to, and he throws the gun. He then tries to leave with the money, as the kids chase him over the cliffside of a gorge. Ross is suddenly surrounded by cops, and the kids and the Dog on both sides of the bridge, just as Ken's parents come looking for him. Suddenly, Ken trips on the bridge, and loses the money. Ross is arrested, along with the other crooks and Dodge, and the day is saved.

The movie ends with the kids reading the newspaper about the recent arrests, as they sit along with Astro in Stanley Park, who they are able to keep after all. The Dog is also now smart enough not to take things from other people that do not belong to him. Just then the Dog starts to suspect something, as the kids chase him down and as it turns out, he was simply chasing a pickpocket. The Dog is proclaimed a hero. Suddenly, the Dog sniffs something interesting underneath a tree. The kids go to see what it is, and it turns out it's a treasure map, that shows a drawing of the totem poles in Stanley Park (which also happens to be right in front of them), and an "X", where the treasure is supposedly buried. The Dog then runs to the totem poles, encouraging the kids to follow his lead, as the movie ends.

== Home media ==
The film was released on home video in the U.K. by Walt Disney Home Video in PAL format. It was also released in France as Capone Chien Gangster, and in Germany as Ein toller Hund. In Japan it was released on VHS by Bandai Video Network and Walt Disney Home Video.

== Cast ==
- Mike the Dog as Capone/Astro
- Barret Oliver as Ken Miller
- Natalie Gregory as Kathy
- Richard B. Shull as Dodge
- Vic Dunlop as Beevis
- Jerry Wasserman as Elvis
- Geoffrey Lewis as Dirty Jerry
- David Huddleston as Doc Ross ("Special Guest Star")
- Frances Flanagan as Joan Miller
- Dale Wilson as Bob Miller
- Pat Armstrong as Stolen Purse Woman
- Garry Chalk as Cop on Bridge
- Don S. Davis as Mr. Haskell
- Duncan Fraser as Caretaker
- Antony Holland as Lost Wallet Man
- Bobby Holt as Larry
- Kim Kondrashoff as Wally
- Dwight Koss as Norris
- Brian Linds as New Recruit
- Andrew Markey as Ashcroft
- Dwight McFee as Shelter worker #1
- Kevin McNulty as Shelter worker #2
- Mavor Moore as Saul Frobel
- Tony Morelli as Arresting Cop
- Ruth Nichol as Beautician
- Margot Pinvidic as New Neighbor
- Doreen Ramus as Dodge's Secretary
- Alvin Sanders as Dwyer
- LeRoy Schulz as Party Man
- Bryant Smith as Snack Bar Guy
- Raimund Stamm as Cop in Park
- Ian Sullivan as Neal
- William S. Taylor as Jail Guard
- Doug Tuck as Lost Watch Man
