= Blume in Love =

1973 film by Paul Mazursky

- Directed by: Paul Mazursky
- Written by: Paul Mazursky
- Produced by: Paul Mazursky
- Starring: George Segal; Susan Anspach; Kris Kristofferson; Shelley Winters
- Cinematography: Bruce Surtees
- Edited by: Donn Cambern
- Music by: Bill Conti (Underscore) (Uncredited)
- Distributed by: Warner Bros.
- Release date: June 17, 1973
- Running time: 115 minutes
- Country: United States
- Language: English
- Box office: $2,900,000 (US/ Canada rentals)

Blume in Love is a 1973 American romantic comedy drama film written, produced and directed by Paul Mazursky. It stars George Segal in the title role, alongside Susan Anspach and Kris Kristofferson. Others in the cast include Mazursky, Marsha Mason and Shelley Winters.

== Plot ==
Wandering alone around St. Mark's Square in Venice, Italy, where he and his former wife Nina had honeymooned, Beverly Hills divorce lawyer Stephen Blume wonders why he was unfaithful to Nina, whom he continues to love in spite of himself. Through a series of extended flashbacks, he reflects on the aftermath of their breakup and divorce.

Nina comes home to find Blume in his bathrobe and his secretary hidden behind their bedroom door, whereupon she leaves him. Although Blume begins to actively date, he is unsatisfied and grows wistful for his married life. Nina, a social worker, embarks on a journey of self-discovery, trying new experiences like yoga and starting a relationship with Elmo, a free-spirited unemployed musician who is 12 years younger than she.

After his divorce, Blume discovers how much he loved Nina and goes to great, sometimes humiliating and mostly futile lengths to win her back, complicated by the fact that he likes Elmo. Although Nina remains skeptical of his motivations, Blume befriends the easygoing Elmo and the three form an unlikely if precarious group of friends.

One night Blume visits Nina's house, ostensibly to see Elmo, but Elmo is not there. Blume tells Nina that he still loves her. She tells him to leave, but he forces himself on her. Elmo enters and Nina tells Elmo that Blume raped her. Blume admits to the rape and Elmo hits him, ending their friendship.

Elmo visits Blume's office to inform him that Nina is pregnant with Blume's baby. Elmo also tells Blume that he is leaving town because "it's time to go." Blume tells Nina that he wants to help support the child, but she is hesitant. They stay in communication and eventually Nina tells Blume that she wants him to leave town for two weeks in order that she may decide what she wants.

Blume is in Venice for the two weeks away from Nina, but he sees her across the square and they embrace.

== Cast ==
- George Segal as Stephen Blume
- Susan Anspach as Nina Blume
- Kris Kristofferson as Elmo Cole
- Marsha Mason as Arlene
- Shelley Winters as Mrs. Cramer
- Donald F. Muhich as Analyst
- Paul Mazursky as Hellman
- Erin O'Reilly as Cindy
- Annazette Chase as Gloria
- Shelley Morrison as Mrs. Greco
- Mary Jackson as Louise
- Ed Peck as Ed Goober

== Reception ==
The film was nominated for a Writers Guild of America (WGA) award in the category of Best Comedy Written Directly for the Screen.

In a contemporary review for the Chicago Sun-Times, Roger Ebert awarded the film four stars out of four, proclaiming it to be "what everybody is always hoping for from Neil Simon: a comedy that transcends its funny moments, that realizes we laugh so we may not cry, and that finally is about real people with real desperations."

Vincent Canby of The New York Times described the film as "a restless, appealing, sometimes highly comic contemporary memoir."

Richard Corliss of Film Comment praised Segal's performance, claiming that "No contemporary actor can touch George Segal for klutzy charm or a seriocomic capacity for suffering (he’s the Tom Ewell of the Seventies), and no film has used his manic copelessness as well as Blume in Love."

In an interview with Robert K. Elder for his book The Best Film You've Never Seen, director Neil LaBute explained: “I was both intrigued and frustrated by what was happening. There’s this fractured telling of the story, several trips to Venice and the rest takes place in Venice, California. So, I think there was attraction to it by the frustration of it—like, ‘What’s happening here? What’s the story?’"

In later years, the film has been cited as a seminal social comedy. On Rotten Tomatoes, Blume in Love holds a rating of 71% from 21 reviews.

== Soundtrack ==
- "Chester the Goat" - music and lyrics by Kris Kristofferson, performed by Segal, Anspach and Kristofferson
- "Settle Down and Get Along" - music and lyrics by Kris Kristofferson
- "Liebestod" - from Tristan and Isolde by Richard Wagner, performed by Arturo Toscanini and NBC Symphony Orchestra
- "Mr. Tambourine Man" - music and lyrics by Bob Dylan
- "Pickpocket" - music by Sammy Creason, Michael Utley, Terry Paul, Turner S. Bruton and Donald R. Fritts
- "I'm in Love with You" - music and lyrics by Dillard Crume and Rufus E. Crume
- "I've Been Working" - music and lyrics by Van Morrison
- "I've Got Dreams to Remember" - music and lyrics by Zelma Redding and Otis Redding
- "You've Got a Friend" - music and lyrics by Carole King
- "De Colores" - traditional
- "Gondoli, Gondola" - music and lyrics by Renato Carosone
- "Dance of the Hours" - from La Gioconda by Amilcare Ponchielli
- "Largo al factotum" - from The Barber of Seville by Gioachino Rossini
- "Wien, du Stadt meiner Träume" - by Rudolf Sieczyński
- "Eine kleine Nachtmusik" - by Wolfgang Amadeus Mozart, performed by the Cafe Quadri Orchestra

== In popular culture ==
- The film is featured briefly in Stanley Kubrick's Eyes Wide Shut (1999) when Nicole Kidman's character is watching the opening scenes on television.
- Along with Mazursky's Bob & Carol & Ted & Alice (1969), Blume in Love served as the opening feature for the reopening of Quentin Tarantino's New Beverly Cinema in Los Angeles in 2014.

== See also ==
- 1973 in film
- List of American films of 1973
