= A Winner Never Quits =

- Print advertisement
- Genre: Biography; Drama; Family; Sport
- Written by: Burt Prelutsky
- Directed by: Mel Damski
- Starring: Keith Carradine; Mare Winningham; Dennis Weaver; Fionnula Flanagan; Huckleberry Fox
- Theme music composer: Dana Kaproff
- Country of origin: United States
- Original language: English

Production
- Executive producers: Daniel H. Blatt; Robert Singer
- Producers: James Keach; Lynn Raynor
- Production locations: Chattanooga, Tennessee; Long Beach, California; Los Angeles
- Cinematography: Joseph F. Biroc
- Editor: Michael A. Stevenson
- Running time: 96 minutes
- Production company: Columbia Pictures Television

Original release
- Network: ABC
- Release: April 14, 1986

A Winner Never Quits is a 1986 television film based on the true story of baseball player Pete Gray, the first one-armed man ever to play major league baseball, hired in 1943 as a "freak attraction" and wartime morale-booster by the Memphis Chicks, Class-A minor league ball club.

Though a success, Gray maintains a tough, defensive veneer, which is softened only by the love of his life Annie and the adulation of baseball fan Nelson Gary Jr., who has also lost an arm (and who would, in real life, become a top minor-league ballplayer himself). With the war depleting big-league baseball's manpower in 1945, Pete Gray finally achieves his goal of entering the Majors when he is hired by the St. Louis Browns.

== Plot ==
Raised in the Northeastern Pennsylvania mining town of Nanticoke, Pete Gray loses his right arm while still a young boy. But through the encouragement of his immigrant parents, Antoinette and Peter Wyshner Sr., and the constant coaching of his older brother Whitey, Gray never gives up on his dream of playing professional baseball. Driven by anger, he finally makes it to the big leagues. But it isn't until he agrees to meet handicapped youngster Nelson Gary Jr., who idolizes him, that Gray finally comes to terms with several life realizations.

== Cast ==
| Actor | Role |
|---|---|
| Keith Carradine | Pete "Wyshner" Gray |
| Mare Winningham | Annie |
| G.W. Bailey | Tatum |
| Dennis Weaver | Peter Wyshner |
| Huckleberry Fox | Nelson Gary Jr. |
| Jack Kehoe | Bloom |
| Fionnula Flanagan | Antoinette Wyshner |
| Ed O'Neill | "Whitey" Wyshner |
| Dana Delany | Nora |
| Charles Hallahan | Nelson Gary Sr. |
| Mary Jo Deschanel | Mrs. Gary |
| Jeff McCracken | Sheldrake |
| Steve Rees | Young Pete Gray |
| Andrew Lubeskie | Young Whitey |
| Brad Sullivan | Taylor |
| John Hostetter | Sergeant |
| Ted Henning | Brook |

== Home media ==
A Winner Never Quits was released on VHS on August 18, 1993, by Columbia TriStar Home Video.

== See also ==
- List of baseball films
