= Misunderstood (1983 film) =

- Theatrical release poster
- Directed by: Jerry Schatzberg
- Written by: Barra Grant
- Based on: Misunderstood by Florence Montgomery
- Produced by: Tarak Ben Ammar
- Starring: Gene Hackman; Henry Thomas; Rip Torn; Huckleberry Fox; Maureen Kerwin; Susan Anspach
- Cinematography: Pasqualino De Santis
- Edited by: Marc Laub
- Music by: Michael Hoppé
- Production company: Producers Sales Organization
- Distributed by: MGM/UA Entertainment Co.
- Release dates: December 10, 1983 (Japan); March 30, 1984 (United States)
- Running time: 91 minutes
- Country: United States
- Language: English
- Budget: $10 million
- Box office: $1,525,532

Misunderstood is a 1983 American drama film directed by Jerry Schatzberg, based on the 1869 novel Misunderstood by Florence Montgomery. This film stars Henry Thomas as a young boy who struggles with family, friends, and relationships after his mother's death.

The novel Misunderstood had previously been adapted by Luigi Comencini as the 1966 Italian film Incompreso which starred Anthony Quayle.

== Plot ==
Ned Rawley is an American shipowner established in Tunisia where his business thrives and monopolizes him. He lives in a beautiful villa with his two sons, Miles and Andrew, who are cared for by a newly arrived housekeeper because their mother has just died in a hospital abroad. The father decides to hide this tragedy from the youngest, inventing an extended trip for his mother.

For the older one, he continues to treat him as a "man", revealing to him the disappearance of his mother but remaining cold with him, being afraid to express his feelings. He does not realize that his son lacks affection and suffers from the absences and the harshness of education imposed on him by his father who transfers all his attentions to the youngest.

Finally, it is only during an accident caused by Andrew that the father and son will get closer.

== Cast ==
- Gene Hackman as Ned Rawley
- Henry Thomas as Andrew
- Rip Torn as Will
- Huckleberry Fox as Miles
- Maureen Kerwin as Kate
- Susan Anspach as Lilly
- June Brown as Mrs. Paley
- Helen Ryan as Lucy
- Nadim Sawalha as Ahmed

== Production ==
Prior to the casting of Gene Hackman, director Jerry Schatzberg had considered Michael Caine for the role of Ned Rawley. Initially intended to be shot in New Zealand, Tarak Ben Ammar convinced Schatzberg to instead film in his home country of Tunisia. Due to creative differences two endings with Schatzberg preferring a tragic conclusion, while Ben Ammar presided over a more “upbeat” version during editing and inserted flashbacks into Schatzberg’s cut. This resulted in Susan Anspach's performance as Lilly Rawley being substantially reduced and only appearing in flashbacks despite being envisioned as a more prominent character. Further revisions to the film were made by MGM/UA without the involvement of Schatzberg or Ben Ammar.

== Release ==
Misunderstood was released in Japan by Toho-Towa on December 10, 1983. It was released in the United States on March 30, 1984.

== Reception ==
=== Box office ===
Made on a budget of $10 million, the movie was also relying on A-List success of Gene Hackman and Henry Thomas, the latter of whom was a successful child star who appeared in several blockbusters during that era. But the film flopped at the US box office, opening at number 11 with $916,967 in 741 screens, and went on to gross just $1,525,532 in its entire domestic run.

=== Critics ===
Critics were mixed on the film, with many praising the acting while also criticizing it for being too restrained in its approach to the subject matter. Janet Maslin's New York Times Review
