= Vienna, City of My Dreams =

Vienna, City of My Dreams (German:Wien, du Stadt meiner Träume) may refer to:

- "Vienna, City of My Dreams" (song), a 1914 song by the Austrian composer Rudolf Sieczyński
- Vienna, City of My Dreams (1928 film), a German silent film directed by Victor Janson
- Vienna, City of My Dreams (1957 film), an Austrian film directed by Willi Forst
