= Gene Wolande =

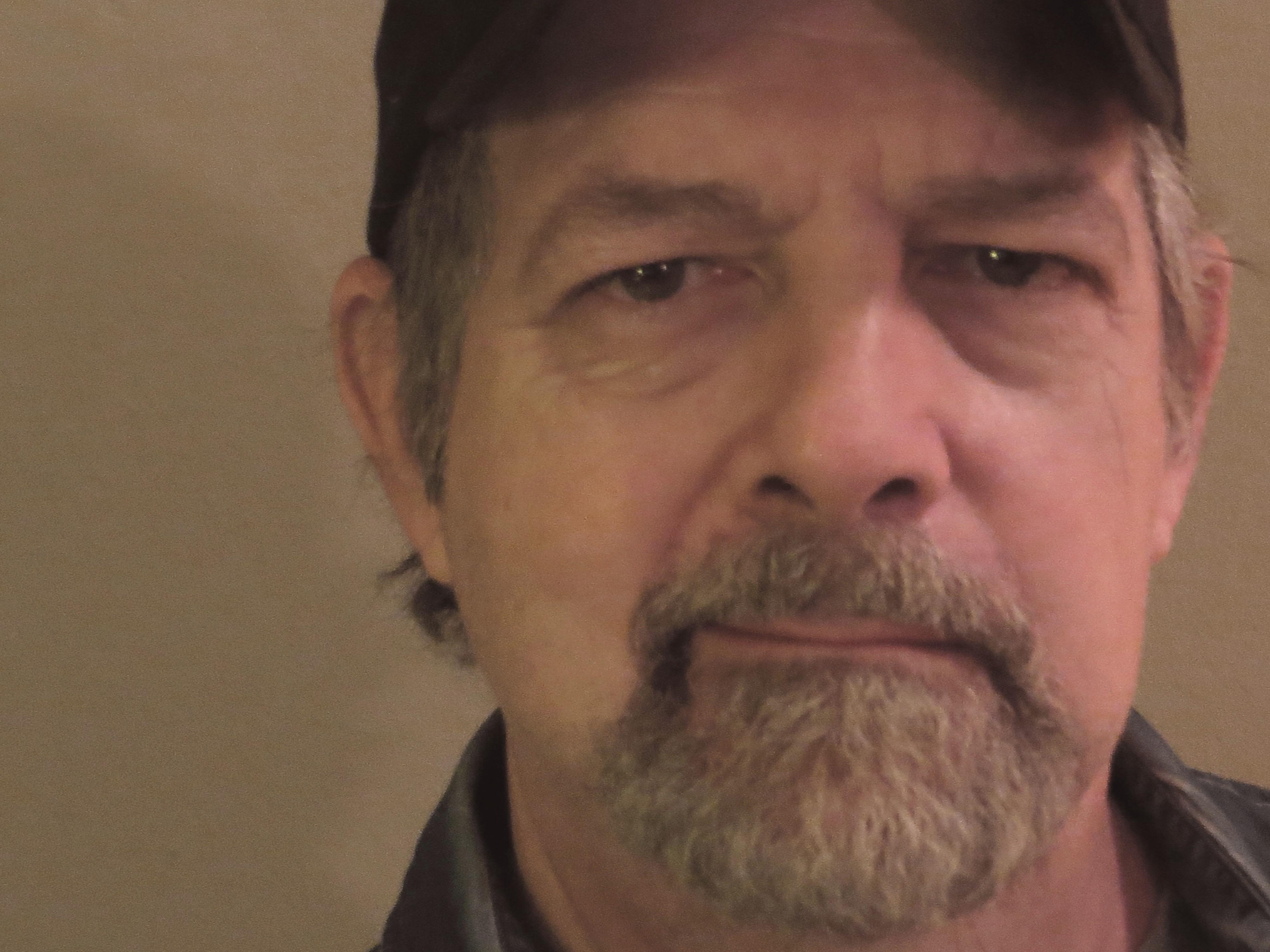
- Born: September 3, 1956 (age 69); Chicago, Illinois, US
- Occupations: Film, television actor, writer, director
- Years active: 1987–present

Gene Wolande (born September 3, 1956) is an American character actor, writer, and director who has appeared in many mainstream film and television projects. He is best known as Ray Pinker in the Academy Award-winning film L.A. Confidential and also for his recurring role in the acclaimed HBO series Carnivàle. As a writer, he has won awards from Francis Ford Coppola's American Zoetrope Studios for his screenplay American Canvas. He has also written for the television series Wonder Years and Star Trek: Deep Space Nine.

== Early life ==
Wolande was born in Chicago, Illinois and is an alumnus of Fenwick High School. He graduated with a bachelor's degree from the University of Dallas before going on to complete his Master of Fine Arts degree from Trinity University at the Dallas Theater Center in Texas. After several years as a resident company member, Wolande appeared in the hit film RoboCop, and decided to move to Los Angeles to continue his career.

== Career ==
His film credits include RoboCop, Chaplin, L.A. Confidential, The Negotiator, A Civil Action, Best Laid Plans, What Planet Are You From?, An Old Man's Gold among many other projects. Television appearances include on Perfect Strangers, Weird Science, Married... with Children, Party of Five, ER, Desperate Housewives, Carnivàle, Sons of Anarchy, as well as numerous television movies and pilots. An accomplished voice-over artist and dialect coach, he has also taught acting and film history. His film Three Shots, which he wrote, directed and acted in was honored at the Director's View Film Festival, the Sarasota Film Festival, The Ashland Independent Film Festival, and the New York Independent Film Festival.
