= Heather Robinson =

American film producer

Heather Robinson Ross
- Born: July 31, 1978 (age 47); Denver, Colorado, U.S.
- Occupations: Screenwriter; producer; philanthropist
- Years active: 2000–present

Heather Robinson Ross (born July 31, 1978) is an American screenwriter, film producer and author.

== Early life ==
Robinson was raised in Littleton, Colorado, and graduated from Sahuaro High School in Tucson, Arizona, in 1996. She became the youngest employee at American Cablevision, moving up the crew ranks while her mother went on to direct and produce her own Public-access television shows on cable TV and access TV.

== Career ==
In 2004, Carrie Fisher convinced Robinson to write a screenplay based on her life as a teenager living with a single mom. Robinson sold her first feature script, The Perfect Man, to Universal Studios that starred Hilary Duff, Heather Locklear and Chris Noth. The film was based on her teenage years in Tucson, Arizona. In 2007 she worked for Oprah Winfrey and Harpo Productions in Chicago, Illinois. In 2008 Robinson and her mother, Jan, remodeled the New Beginnings for Women & Children shelter, through their organization, Refused Reused. Robinson has worked through her own organization Refused Reused in conjunction with the U.S. House of Representatives to help people and animals in shelters. Robinson has donated over 200 Pounds of leather to the Boy Scouts of Southern Arizona for their leather merit program. After taking time off to care for her grandmother who was diagnosed with Alzheimer's, Robinson has found herself touring the film festival market as a Co-Producer on Dog Power a documentary following dog-powered sports such as the international phenomenon of canicross, bike & scooterjoring, skijoring, cart, sprint and middle distance sled dog racing.

In December 2018, Robinson was elected to serve on the board of The National Foundation to End Child Abuse and Neglect EndCAN.org in Denver, Colorado.

== Other activities ==
In addition to being a volunteer and financial contributor to the Wright Flight Organization, Robinson is also active in many other community oriented programs. She is a financial contributor to domestic abuse shelters, animal shelters and financially supports the Alzheimer's Spark! Program in Denver, Colorado.
