= The Devil and Max Devlin =

1981 film by Steven Hilliard Stern

- Theatrical release poster
- Directed by: Steven Hilliard Stern
- Screenplay by: Mary Rodgers
- Story by: Mary Rodgers; Jimmy Sangster
- Produced by: Jerome Courtland
- Starring: Elliott Gould; Bill Cosby; Susan Anspach; Adam Rich; Julie Budd; Sonny Shroyer; David Knell; Chuck Shamata
- Cinematography: Howard Schwartz
- Edited by: Ray de Leuw
- Music by: Buddy Baker
- Production company: Walt Disney Productions
- Distributed by: Buena Vista Distribution
- Release date: February 11, 1981 (United States)
- Running time: 95 minutes
- Country: United States
- Language: English
- Budget: $9 million
- Box office: $16 million (USA)

The Devil and Max Devlin is a 1981 American fantasy–comedy film produced by Walt Disney Productions, directed by Steven Hilliard Stern and starring Elliott Gould, Bill Cosby and Susan Anspach.

The film was considered to be controversial for a Disney film at the time, partly because of the subject matter, but also because of Cosby's atypical portrayal of a villainous character. This film was one of three that influenced Disney to establish Touchstone and Hollywood Pictures as an avenue to produce and release films for mature audiences.

== Plot ==
Max Devlin is the shady landlord and slumlord of a rundown slum in Los Angeles. While running to escape his angry tenants after one of them blurts out that Max is not only the landlord but also the building's owner, Max is killed by a bus and descends into hell, which resembles a corporate headquarters. He meets souls manager Barney Satin, the devil's chief henchman, who tells him that he will release him if he can get three innocent youngsters to sell their souls in exchange for his own. Max agrees and is returned to life, but Barney retains Max's soul, and consequently Max cannot see himself in a mirror. Barney even gives him limited magical powers to help achieve his goal; he tells Max that if he succeeds, the subjects will continue to live until the natural end of their lives. Alive again, Max begins his frantic quest, and Barney, whom only Max can see, appears frequently to check on Max's progress – and to taunt him.

Max's three targets are Stella Summers, a high school dropout and aspiring singer; Nerve Nordlinger, a student who dreams of being popular; and Toby Hart, a child who longs for his widowed mother Penny to find happiness again. Max charms his way into each of their lives by landing a recording contract for Stella, training Nerve as a motorbike racer after school, and spending time with Toby while helping Penny operate a day care facility. Max begins to care for all three of his subjects and discovers his innate decency. He even falls in love with Penny, but finds it difficult to get them to sign away their souls. Stella refuses to sign, believing that Max is trying to get more than his 20% fee as her manager, Nerve is too focused on training for an important race, and Toby refuses to sign unless Max marries Penny.

Eventually Max obtains all three signatures, and upon signing, their personalities immediately change for the worse. After Max and Penny wed, Barney appears and reveals that all three of them will die at midnight, and although Max will get to live until the natural end of his own life, he is still damned. Horrified and angered at being deceived, Max is ready to destroy the contracts, and Barney whisks Max back to hell revealing his true demonic form, threatening Max with even greater torment if he destroys the contracts. Knowing he is already condemned, Max throws the papers into a nearby fire, but he is quickly returned to life.

Believing himself still damned, Max leaves his wedding reception to say goodbye to Nerve and Stella, and finds that their personalities have returned to normal. When he comes back to say goodbye to Toby and Penny, he is overjoyed when he can again see himself in a mirror, surmising that by his self-sacrifice he has been redeemed and Barney is defeated. Attending one of Stella's concerts with Penny and Toby that night, Max looks toward Heaven and gives thanks.

== Cast ==
- Elliott Gould as Max Devlin
- Bill Cosby as Barney Satin
- Susan Anspach as Penny Hart
- Adam Rich as Toby Hart
- Julie Budd as Stella Summers
- Sonny Shroyer as Big Billy Hunniker
- David Knell as Nerve Nordlinger
- Chuck Shamata as Jerry Nadler
- Ronnie Schell as Greg Weems
- Reggie Nalder as Chairman of Devil's Council

== Production ==
The film started its life much differently than it ended up: originally, screenwriter Jimmy Sangster conceived it in 1973 as a Hammer Films horror film called The Fairytale Man with Vincent Price as a dead actor who collects children's souls for the Devil, but it went into turnaround when producer Harold Cohen, who produced two TV movies based on Sangster's other novels, could not raise money for it. Sangster bought the rights back and sold it to Walt Disney Productions. Studio head Ron W. Miller hired Mary Rodgers to rewrite it based on the fact that Freaky Friday (1976), whose screenplay she adapted from her own novel, had been one of the studio's biggest hits of a decade for which profitable and critically well-received new films were few and far between for them. The title changed to The Devil and Max Devlin to reflect both its Faustian origins and the studio's desire not to be perceived as making movies that are only for children, while bike racing and music replaced the theater (despite that being what Rodgers' father, composer Richard Rodgers, was most famous for), and instead of just children, the Devil wanted adults' souls as well.

This was the second of two films that Elliott Gould made for Disney after The Last Flight of Noah's Ark, which also had a plot line related to religion.

Bill Cosby had declined previous offers of movie roles from Disney, due to rumors that the studio was unwelcoming to minorities. He and his wife Camille expressed reservations about a black actor playing the devil, but he eventually accepted the role because it had historically been played by white actors. The film was shot on Soundstage 3 at Disney's Burbank studio where the underworld set used so many butane furnaces, dry ice, and smoke machines pushing the heat up to 100 degrees, the cast and crew could only stay inside for a limited time while shooting. Part of Max Devlin's initial descent into Hell also incorporated footage of bodies marching from 1979's The Black Hole. Filming took place in San Diego, California.

== Soundtrack ==
In addition to the musical score by Buddy Baker, with orchestration performed by Joseph Dubin, the film features two songs composed by Marvin Hamlisch and sung by Julie Budd: "Any Fool Could See" (lyrics by Allee Willis) and "Roses and Rainbows" (lyrics by Carole Bayer Sager). They were released as a single on both the A&M Records and Buena Vista Records labels in both the U.S. and the U.K., but it did not chart. To date, neither the two singles nor the film's underscore have received any kind of release on CD, but Julie Budd rerecorded the latter song for a 2005 album called The New Classics.

== Reception ==
The film was met with very negative reviews from critics, many of which were heavily critical of its satanic imagery and Cosby's performance. Vincent Canby of The New York Times wrote that the film "is neither the worst nor, certainly, the best of the lot." Variety wrote, "Though starting out well, film falls on its face fast, and never recovers." Gene Siskel of the Chicago Tribune was positive, giving the film three stars out of four and calling it "a surprising success. Newspapers have been filled with stories commenting of the demise of the Disney magic, but 'The Devil and Max Devlin' shows signs that someone is living in the 1980s on the Disney Burbank lot. This is a very funny little movie." Sheila Benson of the Los Angeles Times wrote, "Somewhere inside 'The Devil and Max Devlin' (citywide), a lively, well-thought-out script (by Mary Rogers) struggles against layers of Disneyfication ... Cosby, in an unsympathetic first for him, has nothing which stretches either his comedic or his acting gifts." Gary Arnold of The Washington Post wrote, "It's no fun at all watching a lumpy, glum Elliott Gould going through the motions of preying on a group of children before reforming himself with the foregone conclusion of a last-minute change of heart. The real self-image problem may exist at the Disney organization, which appears to be groping desperately for less innocuous story material." As of May 2024, the film holds an 17% score on Rotten Tomatoes based on 12 reviews.

It was considered controversial for Disney, particularly for its darker subject material and Cosby's portrayal of a villainous character. It was also not a sizable moneymaker for the studio; it came in 45th place in the yearly U.S. box office race with a $16 million gross, but an August 1981 article in the New York Times quoted Ron W. Miller as saying that it lost money. Although the film also was one of the earliest in a series of PG-rated films designed to modernize the studio's image, this had a reciprocal negative effect when they received angry letters from longtime supporters of the company who objected to the profanity in the dialogue, claiming that Walt Disney would never have allowed it. In fact, he allowed characters to use the word "hell" in the feature films 20,000 Leagues Under the Sea, Sleeping Beauty, and 101 Dalmatians and depicted it as a place in the short cartoon Pluto's Judgement Day. This persuaded Disney to delve further into the idea of creating other labels to handle such family-unfriendly material, though it would be another three years before that actually happened.

First released on videocassette in the U.S. in late 1981 and then discontinued for years in spite of Bill Cosby's renewed TV popularity because of The Cosby Show (which started its eight-year run in 1984, the same year Elliott Gould's sitcom E/R came and went), Anchor Bay Entertainment released the film on DVD on November 14, 2000, and Walt Disney Home Entertainment re-released it on DVD on January 17, 2006.

In the U.K., its 1981 videocassette debut caused a minor stir as it coincided with the growing uproar over "Video nasties," the press-generated term for films with gory violence and explicit sex. Anti-censorship campaigner Liam T. Sanford wrote a letter to the police watch committee about the film just to make a point about their criteria for pulling films, and they actually pulled it. The suspension was only temporary; the film had already passed the BBFC classification with an A rating in cinemas in 1981 and again with a PG in 1982 for videocassette and 2006 for DVD.

Though Jimmy Sangster received on-screen credit for the film's story but not the screenplay, he said of the experience: "My only consolation in the affair (apart from the money) was the fact that I got to share a screen credit with the daughter of Richard Rodgers ... that's the Richard Rodgers who wrote all the great musicals. Would that his daughter had been as good a screenwriter as her father was a musician."

== See also ==
- The Devil and Daniel Webster (film)
- Something Wicked This Way Comes (film)
