= NYC: Tornado Terror =

- Written by: T. S. Cook
- Directed by: Tibor Takács
- Starring: Nicole de Boer; Sebastian Spence; Jerry Wasserman; Tegan Moss
- Music by: Clinton Shorter
- Country of origin: Canada
- Original language: English

Production
- Producer: Cheryl-Lee Fast
- Cinematography: Adam Sliwinski
- Editor: Jason Pielak
- Running time: 90 minutes
- Production company: Fast Productions

Original release
- Network: Sci-Fi Channel
- Release: October 4, 2008

NYC: Tornado Terror is a 2008 Canadian television disaster film. It stars Nicole de Boer, Sebastian Spence, and Jerry Wasserman. It premiered on Sci-Fi Channel on October 4, 2008, and is directed by Tibor Takács.

== Cast ==
- Nicole de Boer as Dr. Cassie Lawrence
- Sebastian Spence as James 'Jim' Lawrence
- Jerry Wasserman as Mayor Leonardo
- Tegan Moss as Lori Lawrence

== Production ==
A very critical review underlined that, although set in New York and probably alluding to the 2007 Brooklyn tornado, the film was actually shot in Vancouver.

== Home media ==
The film was released on DVD on May 25, 2010.

== Reception ==
Writing for Ranker, Harper Brooks noted ”While its critical reception was lukewarm, it’s memorable for its depiction of metropolitan chaos and environmental theories gone awry.”

Other reviews were generally negative.
