= The Invader (1997 film) =

- Directed by: Mark Rosman
- Starring: Sean Young; Ben Cross; Daniel Baldwin; Nick Mancuso
- Cinematography: Gregory Middleton
- Music by: Todd Hayen
- Release date: September 12, 1997
- Running time: 93 min.
- Country: United States
- Language: English

The Invader is a 1997 film directed by Mark Rosman.

== Plot summary ==
A day has come when not one, but two UFOs make their way into Earth's atmosphere. The larger ship is clearly chasing the smaller one, and the alien has the look of a soldier about him. The smaller ship is able to cause the larger one to crash, then lands itself. The pilot (Renn) sets out for town looking for an Earth woman named Annie Nilssen. Annie is a local schoolteacher who has recently broken up with her boyfriend, Sheriff Jack Logan. While she's on a girl's night out at the tavern with a friend, she encounters Renn. Refusing his offer to take her home, they nonetheless share a kiss.

Feeling ill during school the next day, she goes to her doctor only to be told she is 2 ^{1}/_{2} months pregnant - an impossibility not only because she broke up with Logan four months ago but because uterine scarring had made her infertile. While reading up on pregnancy and baby books at home that night, she is found by Renn. He explains he is the father of her baby and insists she come with him to escape the following alien killer. Renn ends up having to kidnap Annie. When she wakes the next day, he gives her an egg-shaped supplement and tries to explain to her about how his world had died and why his people needed Earth women - to repopulate themselves. The pregnancy is meant to be done in three days, and he has to take her back to his ship. Annie doesn't believe him and tries to escape until she meets Willard, the second alien. He had accompanied Jack Logan and his deputies on a rescue expedition and tries to kill Annie on the trail. His attempt is foiled by one of the deputies, and Renn is able to reclaim Annie and keep moving her to his ship. When his ship is found to be destroyed by a lightning storm, they must continue on to the nearest mountaintop to try and connect with his mothership.

Over the course of their journey, Annie begins to soften towards her captor. Renn in turn discovers he's developing feelings for the Earth woman. They barely make it in time to a mountain where the baby's psychic cry has alerted the mothership to come for them. Annie has the baby. Renn kills Willard in a final fight but is mortally wounded. He tells Annie he repaired the damage to her uterus; she can have children of her own now. Renn dies at peace with having completed his mission, and his people take his body and the baby away. Annie and Jack embrace, and Annie looks up at the departing ship wondering what will become of the little girl known as "Daughter of Annie."

== Cast ==
- Sean Young – Annie Nilssen
- Ben Cross – Renn
- Daniel Baldwin – Jack Logan
- Nick Mancuso – Willard
- Lynda Boyd – Gail
- Tim Henry – Older Cop
- Ken Tremblett – Deputy Davidson
- Robert André – McNeil
- Craig Bruhnanski – Gessner
- Joe Maffei – Bartender
- Alan Franz – Rookie Cop
- Howard Storey – Hunter #1
- Patrick Stevenson – Hunter #2
- Linda Ko – Doctor
- Stephen Dimopoulos – Motel Clerk
- Kyle Hogg – Classroom Boy
- Alexa Mardon – Classroom Girl
- Marc Baur – Portsmith Cop
