= Mark Rosman =

American film director

- Born: August 15, 1957 (age 69); Los Angeles, California, U.S.
- Education: University of California, Los Angeles: New York University
- Occupations: Film director, film producer, television director, screenwriter
- Years active: 1983–present

Mark Rosman (born August 15, 1957) is an American film director, film producer, television director and screenwriter.

== Background ==
Rosman is the son of a Beverly Hills dermatologist. He has a brother, who's a lawyer, and a sister. After graduating from Beverly Hills High School, Rosman went to UCLA but left after two years when he wasn't accepted into the film program there. Rosman was accepted into New York University's film program, where he graduated.

== Career ==
During his senior year at NYU, he worked as a voluntary assistant director on Brian De Palma's Home Movies.

Rosman launched his career with The House on Sorority Row. Rosman was originally hired to direct the 1984 horror film Mutant, but was replaced by John Cardos early in the production after the studio objected to the way he was shooting the film. In 1985, Rosman had just finished the Disney Channel film The Blue Yonder and was set to work on Spot Marks the X when the Writers Guild went on strike. In 1992, he wrote the script for the thriller Evolver and directed The Force. In 1997, Rosman directed The Invader.

In 1998, Rosman cowrote the script for and directed The Wonderful World of Disney film Life-Size, which led to directing the television film Model Behavior. Rosman then went to work on a number of television shows, but all of them were eventually canceled. He then directed 2004's A Cinderella Story and 2005's The Perfect Man, both films starring Hilary Duff.

Rosman has also worked in episodic television, directing episodes of Lizzie McGuire (his first time working with Hilary Duff), Even Stevens, Ghost Whisperer, The New Alfred Hitchcock Presents, State of Grace and Greek.

=== Film ===
Year	Title	Director	Writer	Producer	Notes
1983	The House on Sorority Row	Yes	Yes	Yes	Also actor (uncredited)
1995	Evolver	Yes	Yes	No	
1997	The Invader	Yes	No	No	
2004	A Cinderella Story	Yes	No	No	
2005	The Perfect Man	Yes	No	No	
2009	Sorority Row	No	No	Yes	Executive producer
2016	Time Toys	Yes	Yes	No	

=== Television ===
Year	Title	Director	Writer	Notes
1985	The Blue Yonder	Yes	Yes	Television film
1986	Spot Marks the X	Yes	Yes	Television film
1988–1989	Alfred Hitchcock Presents	Yes	No	2 episodes
1994	The Force	Yes	No	Television film
2000	Life-Size	Yes	Yes	Television film
2000	Model Behavior	Yes	No	Television film
2001–2002	State of Grace	Yes	No	2 episodes
2001–2003	Lizzie McGuire	Yes	No	2 episodes
2002	Even Stevens	Yes	No	1 episode
2007–2008	Ghost Whisperer	Yes	No	2 episodes
2008	Princess	Yes	No	Television film
2008	Snow 2: Brain Freeze	Yes	No	Television film
2009	Greek	Yes	No	1 episode
2011	William & Kate: The Movie	Yes	No	Television film
2015	A Wish Come True	Yes	Yes	Television film
2017	Sun, Sand & Romance	Yes	No	Television film
