= Montenegro (film) =

1981 film by Dušan Makavejev

- Directed by: Dušan Makavejev
- Written by: Dušan Makavejev; Branko Vucicevic
- Produced by: Christer Abrahamsen; Bo Jonsson; George Zecevic
- Starring: Susan Anspach; Erland Josephson; Marianna Jacobi; Jamie Marsh; John Zacharias; Bora Todorović; Per Oscarsson; Svetozar Cvetković
- Cinematography: Tomislav Pinter
- Edited by: Sylvia Ingemarsson
- Music by: Kornell Kovach
- Release date: 1981
- Running time: 96 minutes
- Country: Sweden
- Language: English
- Box office: $1 million

Montenegro also known as Montenegro – Or Pigs and Pearls (Swedish: Montenegro eller Pärlor och svin) is a 1981 Swedish black comedy film by Serbian director Dušan Makavejev.

== Plot ==
Marilyn Jordan is a bored, depressed American housewife, married to a rich Swedish businessman with two seemingly perfect children. She tries to "spice up" her existence by surprising the family when she eats their entire dinner, setting the bedclothes on fire and poisoning the pet dog's milk and then advising it not to drink (the dog does not drink). Eventually Martin, Marilyn's husband, decides to have a psychiatrist see her, but it only serves to provoke her behaviour, and further exacerbate her frustration.

One day, Marilyn decides to accompany her husband on a business trip, but she gets detained by airport security on a technicality.

After missing her plane, Marilyn is befriended by a group of Yugoslavs, and is taken to a club they run, bearing the odd name of 'Zanzi-Bar'. Marilyn indulges in their fantastic, surreal world of shovel fighting, lamb roasting, striptease and free love. It all culminates with Marilyn having a passionate fling with a young man named Montenegro who works in a zoo.

After spending the night with Montenegro, Marilyn realizes that even though she adores this world, she is a stranger in it. Completely snapping upon this realization, she kills the young man and returns home.

Once back home, Marilyn serves her family a sumptuous gourmet dinner, followed by a light dessert of fruit – which a caption announces is poisoned. The final intertitle states; "the story was based on real events".

== Cast ==
- Susan Anspach as Marilyn
- Erland Josephson as Martin Jordan
- Marianna Jacobi as Cookie Jordan
- Jamie Marsh as Jimmy Jordan
- John Zacharias as Grandpa Bill
- Per Oscarsson as Dr. Aram Pazardjian
- Marina Lindahl as Secretary
- Bora Todorović as Alex Rossignol
- Lisbeth Zachrisson as Rita Rossignol
- Svetozar Cvetković as Montenegro
- Patricia Gélin as Tirke
- Dragan Ilić as Hassan
- Nikola Janić as Mustapha
- Mile Petrović as Zanzi Bar Customer
- John Parkinson as Piano Player

== Reception ==
On Rotten Tomatoes the film has an approval rating of 88% based on reviews from 16 critics.

Roger Ebert of the Chicago Sun-Times gave it a 4 out of 4 and wrote: "There can be something absolutely liberating about a movie that makes up its rules as it goes along." Vincent Canby of The New York Times gave it a negative review, and called it "A halfheartedly Surreal comedy filled with forced high spirits, unconvincing lunacies and failed sight gags."

== Awards ==
Montenegro was nominated for the Golden Palm Award at the 1981 Cannes Film Festival; it gained Audience Award and Mostra Special Award at São Paulo International Film Festival

== Music ==
Marianne Faithfull sings "The Ballad of Lucy Jordan" over the opening credit sequence.
