= Best Laid Plans (1999 film) =

- Promotional movie poster
- Directed by: Mike Barker
- Written by: Ted Griffin
- Produced by: Sean Bailey; Betsy Beers; Alan Greenspan; Chris Moore
- Starring: Reese Witherspoon; Alessandro Nivola; Josh Brolin
- Cinematography: Ben Seresin
- Edited by: Sloane Klevin
- Music by: Craig Armstrong
- Production companies: Fox 2000 Pictures; Dogstar Films
- Distributed by: Fox Searchlight Pictures
- Release date: September 10, 1999
- Running time: 92 minutes
- Country: United States
- Language: English
- Budget: $7 million
- Box office: $27,816

Best Laid Plans is a 1999 American crime drama film directed by Mike Barker and written by Ted Griffin. The film stars Reese Witherspoon, Alessandro Nivola, and Josh Brolin. Best Laid Plans was released by Fox Searchlight Pictures on September 10, 1999. The film received mixed reviews from critics and grossed $27,816 against a $7 million budget.

== Plot ==
Bryce is a successful man who returns to his tiny hometown for a visit. While there, he runs into his old friend Nick. The two decide to go out for the night. When they enter a bar, Bryce encounters Kathy, a blonde temptress whom he eventually takes home for the night to have sex. When he awakens, Kathy threatens to tell the police that Bryce has committed rape. Bryce panics and decides to tie her up and hide her away in the basement. He then makes a call to Nick. Unbeknownst to Bryce, Kathy is actually Nick's girlfriend Lissa. The two had schemed to use Bryce's money to pay off a $15,000 debt they owe a drug dealer Nick helped rob

== Cast ==
- Reese Witherspoon as Lissa/Kathy
- Alessandro Nivola as Nick
- Josh Brolin as Bryce
- Terrence Howard as Jimmy
- Jamie Marsh as Barry
- Rocky Carroll as Bad Ass Dude
- Gene Wolande as Lawyer
- Owen Bush as Vagrant
- Sean Nepita as Freddie
- José Mendoza as Renaldo
- Michael G. Hagerty as Charlie
- David Mandel as Evangelist
- Alec Berg as Phone Guy No. 1
- Jeff Schaffer as Phone Guy No. 2

== Production ==
Fox 2000 Pictures optioned Ted Griffin's script for Best Laid Plans in October 1996, around the same time Fox 2000 acquired Griffin's scripts for Ravenous and Beached. The script was described as a "hip erotic thriller" to be produced by Sean Bailey of Horsepower Entertainment, Chris Moore and Mike Newell with Newell a possible choice to direct. In December 1997, it was reported that Alessandro Nivola, Josh Brolin, and Reese Witherspoon were set to star in the film with Mike Barker slated to direct with principal photography to take place in Los Angeles and Bakersfield, California in January 1998.

== Reception ==
Best Laid Plans received mixed reviews. On the review aggregator website Rotten Tomatoes, 43% of 21 critics' reviews are positive, with an average rating of 5.8/10. Metacritic, which uses a weighted average, assigned the film a score of 41 out of 100, based on 14 critics, indicating "mixed or average" reviews.

== Awards and nominations ==
California on Location Awards

- 1998: Won "Location Professional of the Year - Features" - Diane Friedman
