= Jerry Wasserman =

American actor

- Born: November 2, 1945 (age 80); Cincinnati, Ohio, U.S.

Jerry Wasserman (born November 2, 1945) is an American professor and film and television actor.

Wasserman was born in Cincinnati, Ohio.

He was a professor of English and Theatre at the University of British Columbia. He was also a frequent co-star of Don S. Davis. At Cornell University, he received a doctorate in English literature.

== Edited works ==
- Modern Canadian Plays (1985)
- Spectacle of Empire: Marc Lescarbot’s Theatre of Neptune in New France (2006)
- Theatre and AutoBiography: Writing and Performing Lives in Theory and Practice (2006) (with Sherrill Grace)

== Filmography ==
Actor
Year	Film	Role	Other notes
1984	Low Visibility	Dr. Korona	
1985	Blackout (TV movie)	Motel Clerk	
1986	Spot Marks the X (TV movie)	Elvis	
1986	The Christmas Star (TV movie)	Desk Sergeant	
1986	Danger Bay 1986–1989 (TV series)	Len / Mark Shapiro / 'Redd'	
1987	Stingray (TV series)	Head Marshal	
1987	Stone Fox (TV movie)	Carson	
1987	Hands of a Stranger (TV movie)	Hotel Employee	
1987	Airwolf (TV series)	Ackroyd / Valdez	
1987	Assault and Matrimony (TV movie)	Desk Clerk	
1987	The New Adventures of Beans Baxter (TV series)	Number Two	
1987	21 Jump Street (TV series)	Assistant District Attorney Brabeck / Anderson / Knoller / Sergeant Crenshaw	
1987	Wiseguy (TV series) 1987–1990 (TV series)	Max / Burt / Monique's Friend	
1988	MacGyver 1988–1990 (TV series)	Falco / Maddox / Nick Milani	
1988	Deadly Pursuit	FBI Agent	
1988	J.J. Starbuck (TV series)	Jean Claude	
1988	The Red Spider (TV movie)	Velch	
1988	The Accused	Plea Bargain Lawyer	
1989	Quarantine	Senator Ford	
1989	The Fly II	Simms	
1989	The Penthouse (TV movie)	Unknown	
1989	Unsub (TV series)	Magnus	
1989	Top of the Hill (TV series)	Dr. Eisenberg	
1989	Cold Front	Cooper	
1989	Look Who's Talking	'Mr. Anal'	
1989	Bordertown 1989–1990 (TV series)	Hank Jefferies / Timmins / Whiskey Wagon Guard	
1990	Sky High (TV movie)	Ralph	
1990	Booker (TV series)	Lieutenant Goodman	
1990	Short Time	Cop	
1990	Neon Rider 1990–1993 (TV series)	Detective Hepburn / Mr. Amberson / Patrick	
1991	The Black Stallion (TV show) (TV series)	Dr. Harrison	
1991	Fly by Night (TV series)	Nick Sconto	
1991	Run	Halloran's Lieutenant	
1991	Scene of the Crime (TV series)	Unknown	
1991	Broken Badges (TV series)	Attorney	
1991	Mystery Date	Detective Al Condon	
1991	Palace Guard (TV series)	Grant Dillon	
1992	Still Not Quite Human (TV movie)	Man Tourist	
1992	Crow's Nest	Detective Ray Quinlan	
1992	Stay Tuned	Cop	
1992	Shame (TV movie)	Tom Rainey	
1992	The Heights (TV series)	Jimmy Bandisi	
1993	Alive	Co-Pilot Dante Lagurara	
1993	The Hat Squad (TV series)	Tony 'Tony D.'	
1993	Miracle on Interstate 880 (TV movie)	Dr. Scott	
1993	When a Stranger Calls Back (TV movie)	Detective Brauer	
1993	Sherlock Holmes Returns (TV movie)	Lieutenant Civita	
1993	Final Appeal (TV movie)	Miguel	
1993	Cobra (TV series)	Calgrove	
1993	Other Women's Children (TV movie)	Randy Gross	
1993	The Only Way Out (TV movie)	Brock	
1993	Madison (TV series) 1993–1997 (TV series)	Don Novak	
1994	Max	Attorney Lawrence	
1994	Trust in Me	Kanzer	
1994	Birdland (TV series)	Shalimar	
1994	Moment of Truth: Broken Pledges (TV movie)	Dr. Parmel	
1994	Heart of a Child (TV movie)	Cardiologist	
1994	Tears and Laughter: The Joan and Melissa Rivers Story (TV movie)	Max	
1994	Roommates (TV movie)	ICU Doctor	
1994	Double Cross	First Detective	
1994	The Disappearance of Vonnie (TV movie)	Lieutenant Vigo	
1994	Nowhere to Hide (TV movie)	Unknown	
1994	Beyond Betrayal (TV movie)	Detective	
1994	M.A.N.T.I.S. (TV series)	Detective Paul Warren	
1994	The X-Files (TV series)	Dr. John Grago / Dr. Plith	
1995	Red Scorpion 2	Steinberg	
1995	Robin's Hoods (TV series)	Detective Conroy	
1995	Deadlocked: Escape from Zone 14 (TV movie)	Archer's Attorney	
1995	She Stood Alone: The Tailhook Scandal (TV movie)	Carl Perkins	
1995	Crying Freeman	Chief Randall	
1995	Cyberjack	Neil Jervis	
1995	When the Vows Break (TV movie)	Mr. Morley	
1995	The Outer Limits (TV series)	Dr. Silcase / Gunther Van Owen / William Talbot	
1996	When Friendship Kills (TV movie)	E.R. Doctor	
1996	Profit (TV series)	Dr. Wenner	
1996	She Woke Up Pregnant (TV movie)	Judge Arnold Rolfe	
1996	Malicious	Detective #1	
1996	Mask of Death	Tony Lopata	
1996	Poltergeist: The Legacy (TV series)	Dr. Patterson	
1996	Maternal Instincts	Detective Jack Kramer	
1996	Two (TV series)	Unknown	
1996	Diana Kilmury Teamster (TV movie)	Les	
1996	Gone in a Heartbeat (TV movie)	Mr. Ross	
1996	The Sentinel (TV series)	Brad's Lawyer / Killibrew	
1997	Contagious	Detective Barnes	
1997	Their Second Chance (TV movie)	Gordon	
1997	Dad's Week Off (TV movie)	Detective	
1997	Wounded	Dr. Sam Cohen	
1997	High Stakes (TV movie)	Unknown	
1997	Intensity (TV movie)	Head of The Hospital	
1997	The Diary of Evelyn Lau (TV movie)	Man On Dock	
1997	Kitchen Party	Les Sr.	
1997	Police Academy: The Series (TV series)	Vic DiMozo	
1997	Mr. Magoo	Javier	
1998	Outrage (TV movie)	Officer Dan McRyan	
1998	Dirty	Repoman	
1998	Circle of Deceit (TV movie)	Leo Pappas	
1998	Viper (TV series) (TV series)	Philip Leech	
1998	Goldrush: A Real Life Alaskan Adventure (TV movie)	Fisher	
1998	One Hot Summer Night (TV movie)	Judge Block	
1998	Golf Punks	Joe	
1998	Cold Squad (TV series)	Inspector Vince Schneider	
1998	Stargate SG-1 1998–2004 (TV series)	Chief Of Staff / Whitlow	
1999	The Crow: Stairway to Heaven (TV series)	Judge Paul Morrison	
1999	Beggars and Choosers (TV series)	Irwin	
1999	A Cooler Climate (TV movie)	Leo	
1999	Evolution's Child (TV movie)	Agent Edmunds	
1999	So Weird 1999–2000 (TV series)	Club Manager / James Garr	
1999	First Wave 1999–2000 (TV series)	Dr. Markowitz / Sammy 'The Horse' Kozack	
2000	Call of the Wild (TV series)	Theobold 'Soapy' Smith	
2000	Honey, I Shrunk the Kids: The TV Show (TV series)	Sonny	
2000	Christina's House	Sheriff Mark Sklar	
2000	Scorn (TV movie)	Swirski	
2000	Hollywood Off-Ramp (TV series)	Unknown	
2000	The Operative	Urquhart	
2001	The Heart Department (TV movie)	Doctor #4	
2001	Touched by a Killer	Mitch Clarke	
2001	Head Over Heels (TV mini-series)	FBI Captain Vince	
2001	Mysterious Ways 2001–2002 (TV series)	Detective Cobb	
2002	Liberty Stands Still	Wall Street Man	
2002	Dark Angel (TV series)	Dr. George	
2002	L.A. Law: The Movie (TV movie)	Ron Gervin	
2002	Taken (TV mini-series)	Surgeon	
2002	Smallville 2002–2005 (TV series)	Dr. Yaeger Scanlan	
2003	The Dead Zone (TV series)	Sam Baker	
2003	First to Die	Lieutenant Roth	
2003	Little Brother of War	Hank O'Connor	
2005	The Survivors Club (TV movie)	'Fitz' Fitzpatrick	
2005	Tru Calling (TV series)	Marlon	
2005	I, Robot	Baldez	
2005	Young Blades (TV series)	Oliver Cromwell	
2005	Bob the Butler	Detective Alvarez	
2005	Behind the Camera: The Unauthorized Story of 'Mork & Mindy' (TV movie)	Frank	
2005	The Long Weekend	Gordon Lanson	
2004	Reunion (TV series)	Investigator	
2004	Severed: Forest of the Dead	John	
2004	FBI: Negotiator (TV movie)	FBI Agent Jon Di Carlo	
2006	A Little Thing Called Murder (TV movie)	Jack Reynolds	
2006	Flight 93 (TV movie)	Mickey Rothenberg	
2006	Final Days of Planet Earth (TV movie)	Markley	
2006	Family in Hiding (TV movie)	Cloninger	
2006	The Butterfly Effect 2	Alberto Fuentes	
2006	Behind the Camera: The Unauthorized Story of 'Diff'rent Strokes' (TV movie)	Howard Leeds	
2006	Trapped Ashes	Dr. Stengel	
2006	The Entrance	Rapist	
2006	Black Christmas	Medical Examiner	
2007	The Last Mimzy	Utilities Commissioner	
2007	Crossing	Gerry Casteronova	
2007	Battlestar Galactica (2004 TV series)	Cabott	
2007	Unthinkable (TV movie)	Ed Callahan	
2007	Write & Wrong (TV movie)	Marty Rosen	
2008	Blonde and Blonder	Chief Fitzgerald	
2008	NYC: Tornado Terror (TV movie)	Mayor Leonardo	
2008	Supernatural (U.S. TV series)	Coroner	
2009	Memory Lanes (TV movie)	Earl Corvair	
2009	Alien Trespass	Sam	
2009	Watchmen	Detective Fine	
2009	Sight Unseen (TV movie)	Detective Richard Walker	
2009	A Dangerous Man (video)	Sergeant Ritchie	
2010	Paradox	Hillman	
2010	Sins of the Mother (TV movie)	Carl	
2011	Doomsday Prophecy (TV movie)	Sam Lovell	
2011	Everything and Everyone	William	
2016	The Flash	President of The United States	Episode: Invasion!
2023	The Last of Us	Abe	Episode: When You're Lost in the Darkness
