= Jamie Galen =

American actor

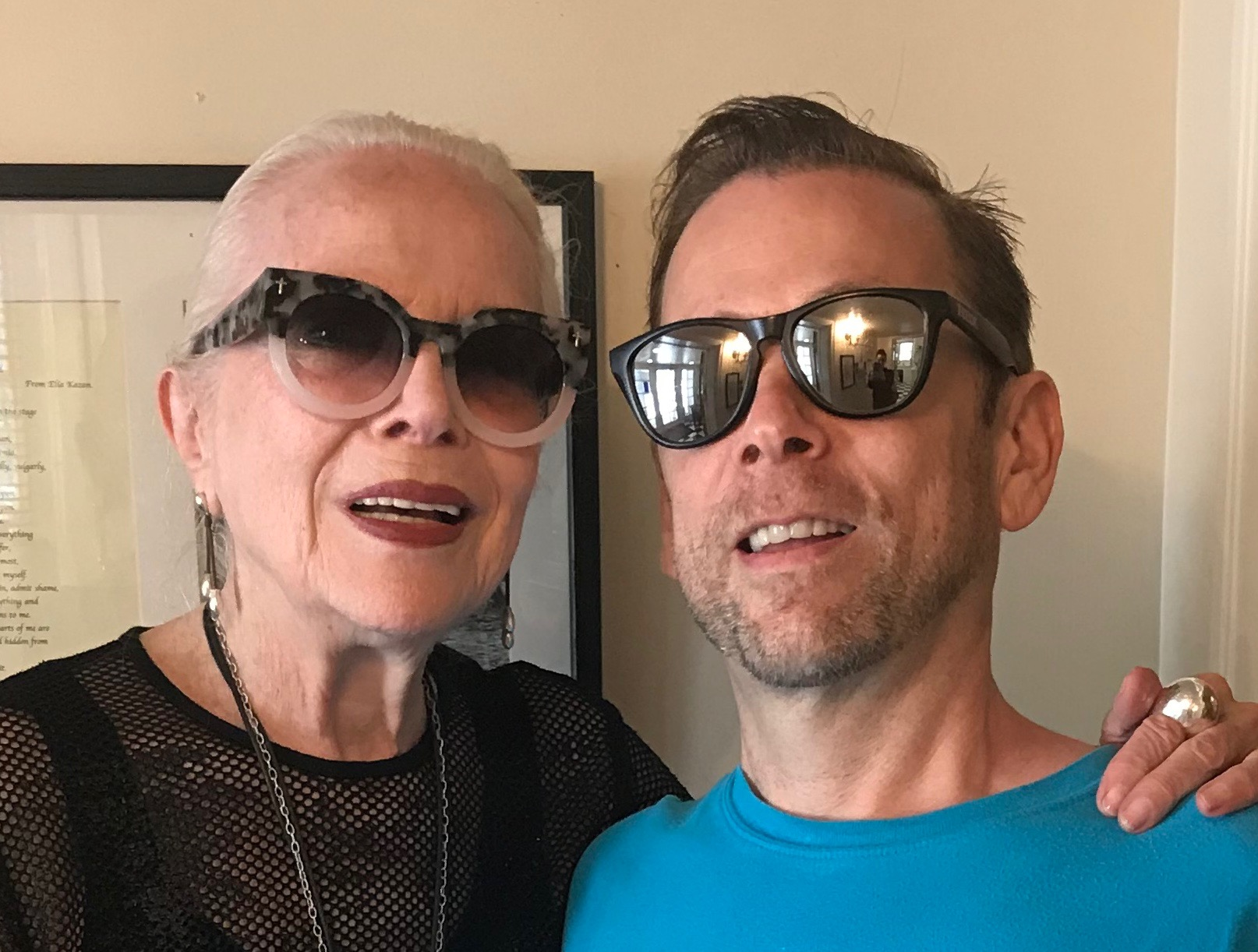
- Jamie with Barbara Bain at The Actors Studio west
- Born: September 17, 1966 (age 59); New York City, New York, U.S.
- Occupations: Stage, Film, Television actor
- Years active: 1981–present

Jamie Galen is an American theatre, television and film actor. He played the lead role of Jay Kurnitz in the Pulitzer Prize winning play Lost in Yonkers and co-starred in the 1994 cult classic Brainscan.

== Early life ==
He was born on September 17, 1966, in New York City. His mother at the time was an unwed teenager and he was placed with a foster family.

== Career ==
In 1981, while living with his adopted family in Stockholm, Sweden, Jamie was cast in his first movie, the Swedish production Montenegro. From 1987 to 1991, he studied at HB Studio.

In 1991, he originated the role of Jay Kurnitz in the original cast of the Tony Award and Pulitzer Prize winning play Lost in Yonkers written by Neil Simon. By 1992, it had been performed over 500 times on Broadway at The Richard Rodgers Theater.

In 1992 Ellen Burstyn invited Jamie to be a member of The Actors Studio. Jamie has been an active member of The Actors Studio west coast since 1993 studying with Mark Rydell and Martin Landau.

He co-starred in the 1994 film Brainscan alongside Edward Furlong. Other film roles include Best Laid Plans (1999), Beethoven's 3rd (2000) and Even Money (2006).

His TV appearances include ER, X-Files and NYPD Blue.

Jamie has also appeared in national commercials for brands including Coke, Volkswagen, Budweiser, M&M's and AT&T.

Galen's M&M's commercial has aired on Halloween since 2001 and is considered a 'classic' commercial.

For most of his career, he was known as Jamie Marsh. In 2023, he changed his last name to his birth family name Galen. He is now known personally and professionally as Jamie Galen.
