= Brainscan =

1994 horror film by John Flynn

- Original theatrical poster
- Directed by: John Flynn
- Screenplay by: Andrew Kevin Walker
- Story by: Brian Owens
- Produced by: Michel Roy
- Starring: Edward Furlong; Frank Langella; Amy Hargreaves; T. Ryder Smith
- Cinematography: François Protat
- Edited by: Jay Cassidy
- Music by: George S. Clinton
- Production company: Coral Productions
- Distributed by: Triumph Films
- Release date: April 22, 1994
- Running time: 95 minutes
- Country: United States
- Language: English
- Box office: $4.3 million

Brainscan is a 1994 American science fiction slasher film directed by John Flynn and written by Andrew Kevin Walker. The film stars Edward Furlong, Frank Langella, Amy Hargreaves, Jamie Marsh, and T. Ryder Smith. The film follows a troubled teenage boy (Furlong) who begins playing an interactive video game which leads to real-life murders. The score was composed by George S. Clinton.

== Plot ==
After a car accident killed his mother and permanently injured his leg, teenager Michael Brower lives an isolated existence in his absent father's house. He spends his spare time watching his neighbor and crush, Kimberly. A horror films and video games fan, Michael's only friend is a similar-minded misfit named Kyle. They are members of the school's Horror Club, which draws the principal's ire. After Kyle tells him about a new, ultra-realistic game called Brainscan, Michael receives the first disc in the mail.

The game warns Michael that the experience is similar to hypnotic suggestions. Trickster, the game's host, greets him and encourages him to act like a psychopathic murderer. For the first mission, he murders a stranger, taking a foot as a trophy. Michael wakes up shocked and thrilled by the experience. However, he is horrified to discover that the same murder occurred in the real world, down to the victim's exact details, before finding the severed foot in his freezer and promptly burning it.

Kyle begs Michael to let him play the game, but he refuses. Later, Trickster materializes into reality and torments Michael. His second mission is to kill a possible witness to the earlier murder. Michael refuses at first but eventually relents. This time, however, he has no memory of playing the game. He finds Kyle's bloody necklace in his freezer and realizes Kyle was murdered.

When Michael calls Kyle, Detective Hayden answers the phone and immediately grows suspicious; subsequent forensics verify that the ashes from Michael's fireplace belong to the first victim's foot. Michael becomes paranoid that he will be sent to jail. Trickster continues plaguing him and ultimately instructs him to kill Kimberly.

At nightfall, Michael sneaks into Kimberly's room but refuses to hurt her. The Trickster reveals himself as Michael's dark counterpart, a manifestation born from his subconscious following his mother's death. He possesses Michael, who resists him. Their struggle wakes Kimberly. Kimberly reveals she has been watching and photographing Michael, which allows him to break free from his own inner darkness. At the last minute, the Trickster materializes and opens the bedroom door. Detective Hayden enters and shoots Michael dead.

Michael awakens in his room, the whole experience having been a fantasy. After ranting at the game about his traumatic experiences, he excitedly realizes that he did not kill anyone, including Kyle. Having gained confidence from the game's iteration of Kimberly, he goes over to her house and asks her out, to which she agrees.

The next day, Michael brings the Brainscan disc to show the principal, who had demanded to preview all games and movies. He caught Trickster grinning in approval, a chilling reminder that the principal was about to endure the same horrific nightmare.

A post-credits twist shatters the film's tidy resolution when a neighborhood dog leaves a severed foot outside Michael's house. The implication is clear: the game's first murder actually happened in the real world. This dark realization reframes the opening sequence, reminding viewers that Michael had already stood outside the first victim's house—watching the coroner remove the body—before he ever played Brainscan. This crucial timeline reframes his innocence from a certainty into an open question.

== Cast ==
- Edward Furlong as Michael
- Frank Langella as Detective Hayden
- T. Ryder Smith as The Trickster
- Amy Hargreaves as Kimberly
- Jamie Marsh as Kyle
- Victor Ertmanis as Martin
- David Hemblen as Dr. Fromberg

== Production ==
The script for Brainscan had initially been written in 1987 by Andrew Kevin Walker and originally was centered around a VHS tape, however after producer Michel Roy acquired the script he performed some uncredited re-writes turning the tape into an interactive CD-ROM video game in order to tap into the public fascination with virtual reality. The character of The Trickster was also a creation in the re-writes as the original script by Walker had no physical antagonist and was simply a voice who tormented Michael over the phone. Principal photography began in July, 1993. Initially the climax was to have had the Trickster become a more deformed monster through usage of prosthetics and animatronics, but once Flynn saw the creature he opted to use more subtle digital effects as he felt the monster designs while horrific were "too real".

John Flynn later recalled:

The main interest for me was the Trickster character (a cadaverous Alice Cooper-like entity who materializes from a CD-ROM computer game - Ed.). The Trickster was the core of the movie and what attracted me to the script. We found this stage actor (T. Ryder Smith) to play the Trickster and he was extraordinary. Eddie Furlong was a 15-year-old kid who couldn't act. You had to "slap him awake" every morning. I don’t want to get into knocking people, but I was not a big Eddie Furlong fan.

== Soundtrack ==
The soundtrack features hard rock, grunge, and heavy metal from then-emerging bands, including Alcohol Funnycar, Mudhoney, White Zombie, OLD, Dandelion, Primus, Tad, Pitchshifter, and the Butthole Surfers. It includes the film's main title theme from George S. Clinton's score.

== Reception ==
Critical reception was mostly negative. Rotten Tomatoes gave the film a "Rotten" rating of 13%, based on 16 reviews. Entertainment Weekly gave Brainscan a "D" rating, and stated "Despite the lurid premise, Brainscan offers zero in the way of sick thrills". Variety also gave a negative review stating, "It's a rare teen horror pic that can be faulted for excessive restraint, but Brainscan may be too tame for the creature-feature fans and slasher devotees who will be drawn by its ad campaign."

The film was released on Blu-ray by Mill Creek Entertainment on a special double feature of Brainscan and Mindwarp, reviewed by Jay Alan of the Horror News Network. He praised the acting and the soundtrack by Primus and White Zombie.

=== Home media ===
Brainscan was released on VHS on November 2, 1994, by Columbia TriStar Home Video.
