= Pete Gray =

American baseball player (1915–2002)

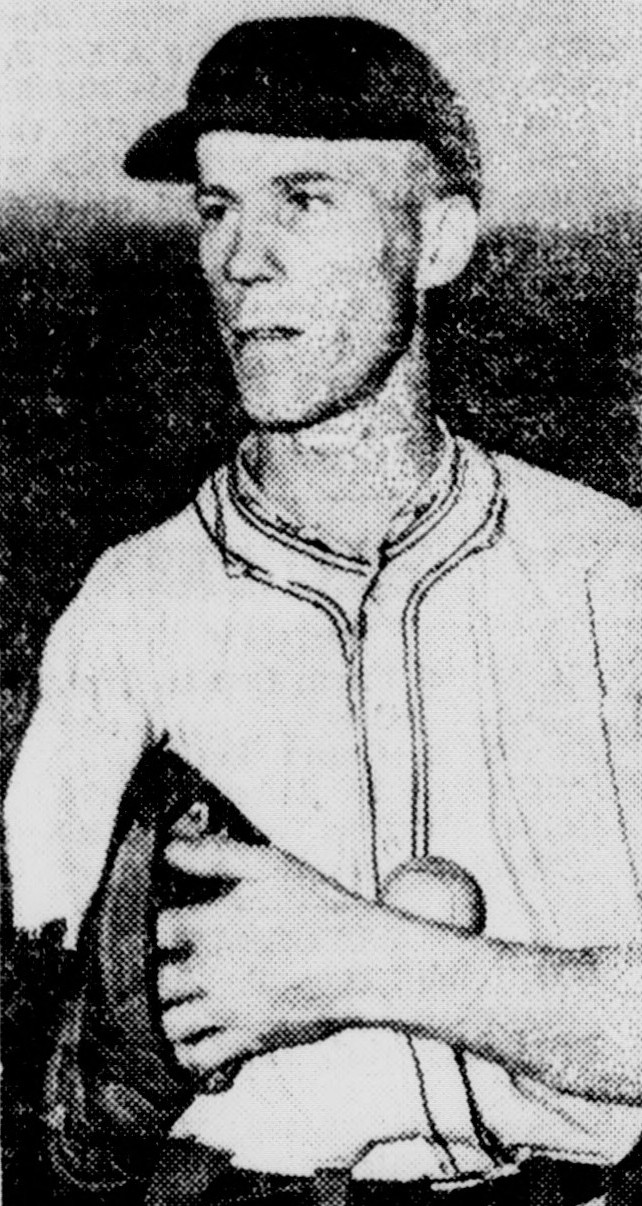
- Gray, circa 1943
- Left fielder
- Born: March 6, 1915; Nanticoke, Pennsylvania, U.S.
- Died: June 30, 2002 (aged 87); Nanticoke, Pennsylvania, U.S.
- Batted: Left Threw: Left

MLB debut
- April 17, 1945, for the St. Louis Browns

Last MLB appearance
- September 30, 1945, for the St. Louis Browns

MLB statistics
- Batting average: .218
- Home runs: 0
- Runs batted in: 13
- Stats at Baseball Reference

Teams
- St. Louis Browns (1945)

Career highlights and awards
- First of three one-armed men to play Major League Baseball

Peter James Gray (né Wyshner; March 6, 1915 – June 30, 2002) was an American professional baseball outfielder who played for the St. Louis Browns of Major League Baseball for one season in 1945. He was notable for playing despite having lost his right arm in a childhood accident.

== Biography ==
=== Early life ===
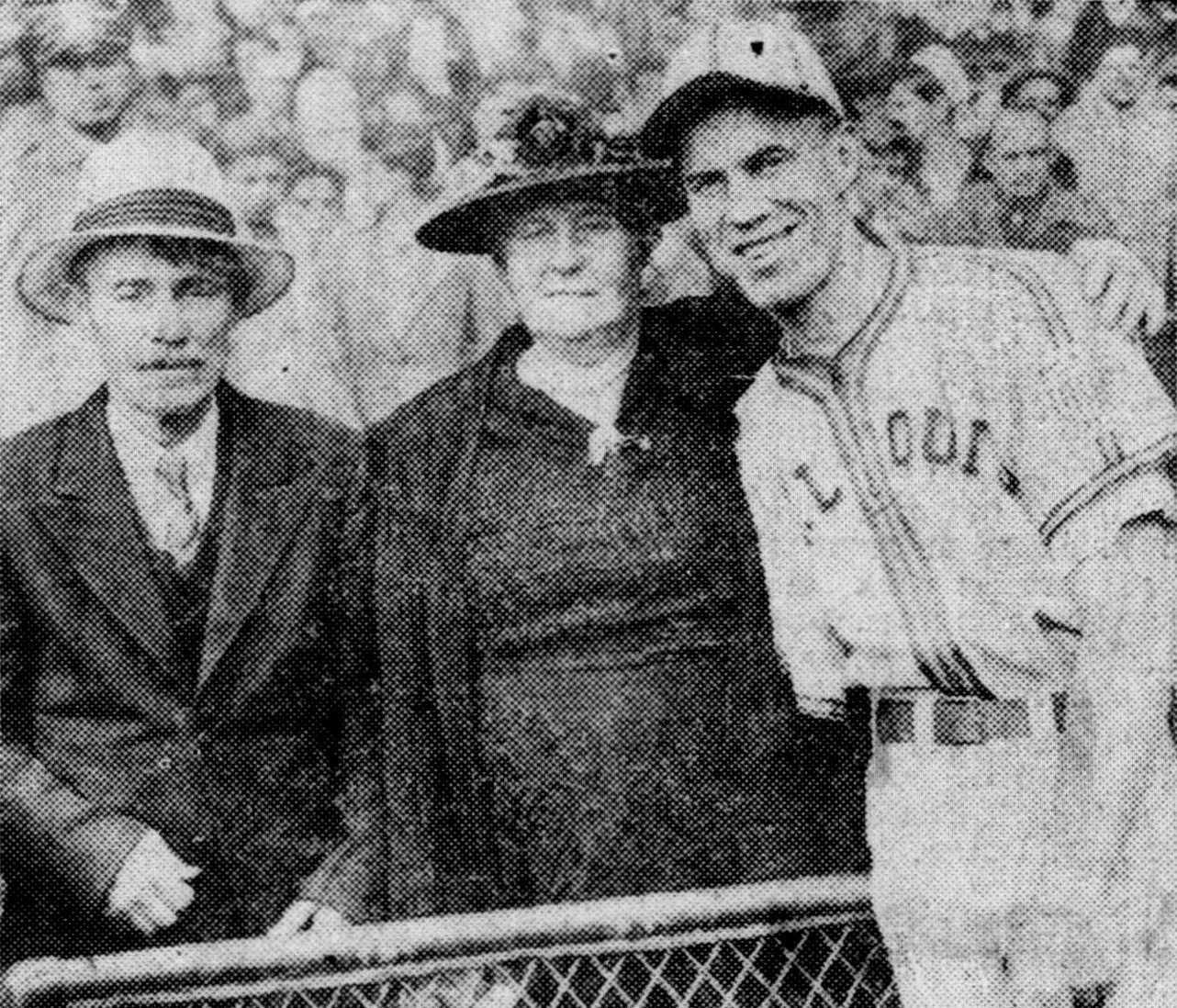
Gray (right) with his father Peter Wyshner (left) and mother Antoinette Wyshner (center) at Yankee Stadium during the 1945 baseball season

Peter Gray (sometimes spelled as Peter Grey) was born as Peter J. Wyshner in the mining town of Nanticoke, Pennsylvania, on March 6, 1915. He was one of five children born to Lithuanian immigrants Antoinette and Peter Wyshner. His father worked in the coal mines of northeastern Pennsylvania to support his family.

His older brother became a boxer in the middleweight division and went under the name Whitey Gray (boxed 1921–1928). During his time as a boxer, Whitey Gray won six matches by KO, lost five (three of which were KO's), had three newspaper decision wins, and two newspaper decision draws. In total, Whitey had 16 bouts with a 37.5% KO rate and boxed a total of 45 rounds.

Wyshner was right-handed, but lost his right arm at age seven or eight, as a result of a wagon accident in 1923. His arm had to be amputated above the elbow. He never could remember exactly how the accident happened, and several versions of the story have emerged through the years. In one version, Wyshner was sitting on a truck with friends and fell off, and his arm got stuck in the spokes of the old-fashioned wheels. After the accident, the driver dropped him on his family's porch and ran off. But Wyshner was so enthusiastic about baseball that he learned to bat and field one-handed, catching the ball in his glove and then quickly removing his glove and transferring the ball to his hand in one motion.

Seven years after his accident, Wyshner completed his formal education at age 13 and began working as a water boy at the Truesdale Colliery. Life was not easy for him, but he did not like being treated with sympathy or being treated differently than others. One story that told about his frustration with being treated differently comes from his days as a young man playing sandlot baseball; He was running home and crashed into the catcher, which knocked the baseball out of the catcher's glove. This resulted in Peter being safe at home plate. The catcher was very upset and told Wyshner that he would hit him, if only he had two arms. Wyshner didn't take this well, and got into the face of the catcher and told him to go ahead and try.

By 19 years of age, Wyshner was playing outfield for the Hanover Lits Baseball Club of the Wyoming Valley Anthracite League. When he began to play semi-professional ball, he changed his last name to "Gray", as his brother had done as a boxer. He wanted to avoid ethnic prejudices, whether of players, coaches, fans, or front office managers. In some areas, some people still resented Eastern European immigrants and their descendants. Now known as Peter Gray, he played with Pine Grove in Pennsylvania and Scranton in Brooklyn, New York. He had tryouts with the St. Louis Browns and Philadelphia Athletics, but was never called up by either team. He continued to play semi-pro and minor league baseball.

In 1941, after the attack of Pearl Harbor, Gray attempted to join the Army, but was denied on the basis that he was an amputee. Gray responded to being rejected by the Army, saying that, "If I could teach myself how to play baseball with one arm, I sure as hell could handle a rifle."

=== Minor league career ===
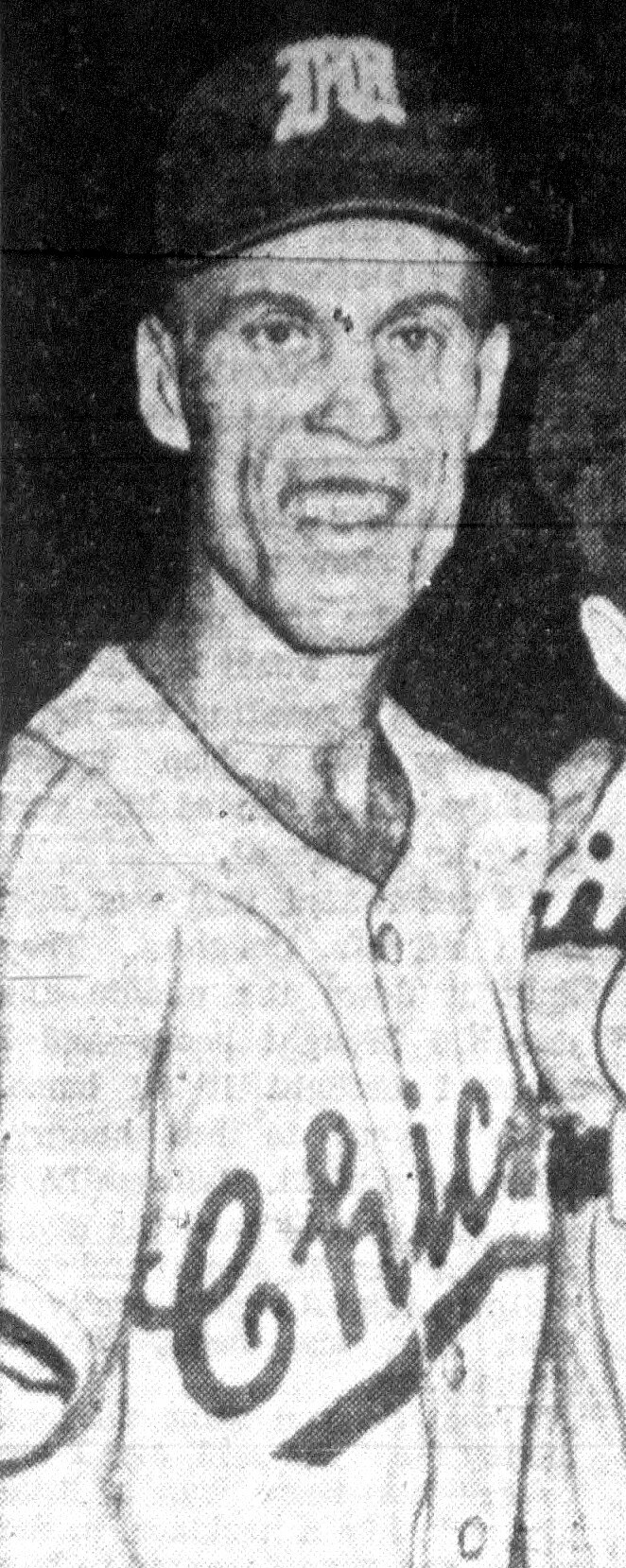
Gray during his tenure with the Memphis Chicks, circa 1944

Gray's speed and placehitting ability made him a successful minor league outfielder. He attained a batting average of .333 and a stolen-base record of 63; as a result, he was named the 1944 Southern Association's Most Valuable Player.

During his career, Gray played for teams including the Trois-Rivières Renards of the Canadian–American League, the Memphis Chicks of the Southern Association and the Brooklyn Bushwicks.

In 1942, Gray signed with the minor league team called the Three Rivers Club of the Canadian–American League. At his first game, the crowd poured out to see him. Gray's chance to shine came in the bottom of the ninth with bases loaded and two outs. As he approached the plate, the crowd went crazy. Gray hit a line drive to right field which drove in the tying and winning runs. The fans were so happy and excited that they threw money onto the field, roughly $700 total. While with the team that season, Gray hit .381. After breaking his collarbone and tearing a ligament, he was only able to play in 42 games.

Gray's success and ability to draw a crowd helped attract the notice of the Memphis Chicks, another minor league team, and they signed him. While Gray was climbing the ladder of the minors, sportswriters nicknamed him the "One-Armed Wonder." Gray had about six successful seasons in the minors before joining the majors for one season. He returned to the minors for about another four seasons as a journeyman. In 1944, while still with the Chicks, he batted .333 and had a league leading 68 stolen bases. That same year, he was awarded the Most Valuable Player of the Southern Association and that year the Philadelphia Sports Writers recognized Pete Gray as the "Most Courageous Athlete." Gray quickly responded with, "Boys, I can't fight, and so there is no courage about me. Courage belongs on the battlefield, not on the baseball diamond."

Teams played for:

| YEAR | AGE | TEAM | LEAGUE | LEV |
|---|---|---|---|---|
| 1942 | 27 | Trois-Rivières Renards | Canadian-American | C |
| 1943 | 28 | Memphis Chickasaws | Southern Association | A1 |
| 1944 | 29 | Memphis Chickasaws | Southern Association | A1 |
| 1946 | 31 | Toledo Mud Hens | American Association | AAA |
| 1948 | 33 | Elmira Pioneers | Eastern League | A |
| 1949 | 34 | Dallas Eagles | Texas League | AA |

Minor League stats:

| YEAR | Gm | AB | H | 2B | 3B | HR | BA | SLG | TB |
|---|---|---|---|---|---|---|---|---|---|
| 1942 | 42 | 160 | 61 | 5 | 0 | 0 | .381 | .413 | 66 |
| 1943 | 126 | 453 | 131 | 7 | 6 | 0 | .289 | .331 | 150 |
| 1944 | 129 | 501 | 167 | 21 | 9 | 5 | .333 | .441 | 221 |
| 1946 | 48 | 96 | 24 | 3 | 0 | 0 | .250 | .281 | 27 |
| 1948 | 82 | 269 | 78 | 7 | 2 | 0 | .290 | .331 | 89 |
| 1949 | 45 | 56 | 12 | 2 | 0 | 0 | .214 | .250 | 14 |
| Total | 472 | 1535 | 473 | 45 | 17 | 5 | .308 | .369 | 567 |

=== Major league career ===
A 1945 newsreel about Pete Gray as it appears in Ken Burns' 1994 documentary series Baseball

The St. Louis Browns of the American League purchased his contract in 1945 from the Chicks for $20,000 (equivalent to $330,000 in 2025), and Gray signed for $4,000 (equivalent to $66,000 in 2025). Wearing uniform number 14, Gray played left and center field for the Browns. He appeared in 77 games, batting .218 with a .958 fielding percentage in center field. He played competently in the outfield, transferring the ball from glove to hand with remarkable speed.

He collected his first major league hit (a single) against the Detroit Tigers on April 17, 1945. On May 20, he fulfilled his lifelong dream and played a double header in Yankee Stadium, collecting five hits and two RBI as the Browns swept the Yankees. The first game ended 10–1 and the second ended 5–1. Gray also proved himself an accomplished bunter. In order to bunt, he planted the knob of the bat against his side, and then slid his hand about one-third of the way up the shaft of the bat.

As the season progressed, it became apparent that Gray could not hit breaking pitches. Once he started his swing, he could not change his timing because he had no second hand to check the swing. Pitchers discovered that fact and threw curve balls. His last big league appearance was on September 30, 1945.

Gray said in 1945, "I've been turned down by more big-league managers than any other man in history. I've spent more money trying to get into baseball than I've earned on the game."

His relationship with teammates was not great, and many were disgruntled because they were in the race to repeat as American League champions and they felt Gray slowed down their success. The 1945 St Louis Browns were 35–42 (.455) in games in which Pete Gray played, while in games which Gray did not play, the Browns were 46–28 (.621) The players also felt, and knew, he was really only there for ticket sales and to boost fan attendance. The previous year they had won the pennant but only had about 508,644 fans attend Sportsman's Park all season. Infielder Don Gutteridge later said in 1994, "Some of the guys thought Pete was being used to draw fans late in the season when the club was still in the pennant race and he wasn't hitting well." That season they finished third and the next season without Gray they fell to seventh. That year with Gray was the Browns' last winning season before moving to Baltimore in 1954. Gray later said of teammates, "If they insulted me, I didn't pay attention. I mostly kept to myself. That's why I got the reputation of being tough to get along with. But, I've mellowed."

Gray's on-field exploits set an inspirational example for disabled servicemen returning from World War II, as was portrayed in newsreels of the period. He visited army hospitals and rehabilitation centers, speaking with amputees and reassuring them that they too could lead productive lives.

Major League stats:

| Year | Team | Gm | AB | R | H | 2B | 3B | HR | RBI | SB | CS | BB | SO | BA | OBP | SLG | OPS | TB | FP |
|---|---|---|---|---|---|---|---|---|---|---|---|---|---|---|---|---|---|---|---|
| 1945 | St. Louis Browns | 77 | 234 | 26 | 51 | 6 | 2 | 0 | 13 | 5 | 6 | 13 | 11 | .218 | .259 | .261 | .520 | 61 | .959 |

=== Techniques used ===
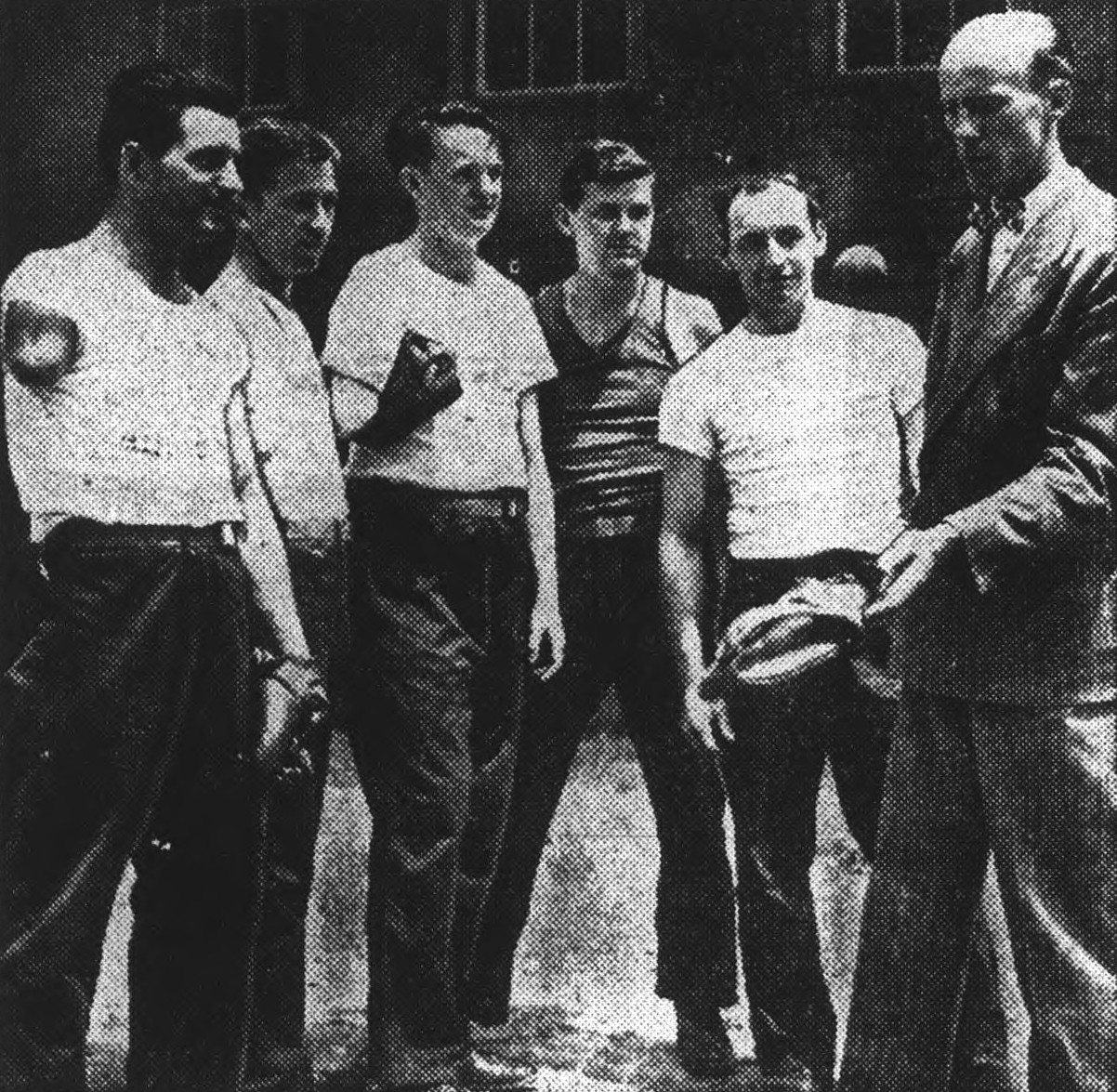
Gray (far right) demonstrates his technique for catching a baseball with one arm for United States armed forces amputees at Walter Reed Army Medical Center in Washington, D.C.

While playing the field, Pete Gray wore a glove without padding. When the ball was hit in his direction he would place the glove directly in front of himself; roughly about shoulder height. When the ball hit the glove he would roll the ball across his chest from left to right. During this motion he learned to rest the glove under his right stump and the ball would roll into his left hand.

When ground balls were hit his way he would let it bounce off his glove at knee height and drop the glove completely to grab the ball while it was still in the air. He was faster in these motions and techniques than some players who had the use of both hands. When backing up another outfielder during a play, he would drop the glove completely and was ready to take the ball with his bare hand.

While at bat he used a full weight bat. His position and stance at the plate was just like any other player. He placed his hand about six inches up on the handle. In order to bunt, he planted the knob of the bat against his side, and then slid his hand about one-third of the way up the shaft of the bat. He was described by sports writers and players as a pure pull hitter.

== Later years and death ==
Gray's major league career ended that same year when many of baseball's stars returned from the battlefront and assumed their previous positions on the diamond. From 1946 to 1949, he played on as a journeyman minor leaguer with the Toledo Mud Hens, Elmira Pioneers and Dallas Stars. Gray returned home to Nanticoke where, although a local hero/celebrity, he struggled with gambling and alcohol, and lived in near poverty.

He also played in barnstorming games with exhibition teams up until the early 1950s. Having only accomplished one year in the majors, he spent the rest of his life wondering if he was ever really good enough to have been there or if he was just an entertainment attraction for the owners to make money. This personal struggle was one of the possible reasons for his struggle with gambling and alcohol after he left baseball. Before his death, however, he regained a sense of integrity about his accomplishments with the success of both the TV movie and the biography about his life.

The 1986 television-movie A Winner Never Quits, starring Keith Carradine and Mare Winningham, and the publication of Gray's biography, One-Armed Wonder: Pete Gray, Wartime Baseball, and the American Dream written by William C. Kashatus, published in 1995 by McFarland & Company, renewed public interest in Gray.

Gray shunned public attention for most of his life after baseball. He died on June 30, 2002, at the age of 87 and is buried at St. Mary's Cemetery in Hanover Township, Pennsylvania. On Sunday, August 24, 2003, Gray was recognized by the Historical and Museum Commission in Pennsylvania when they placed a roadside marker in his hometown. The location of the marker is Front St., Hanover section, Nanticoke, Luzerne County in the Poconos/Endless Mountains Region.

== Legacy ==
- Pete Gray's glove is in the National Baseball Hall of Fame and Museum in Cooperstown, New York.
- Gray was inducted into the Baseball Reliquary's Shrine of the Eternals in 2011.

== Sources ==
- Bill Gilbert, They Also Served: Baseball and the Homefront (New York: Crown, 1992).
- Richard Goldstein, Spartan Seasons: How Baseball Survived the Second World War (New York: Macmillan, 1980).
- William C Kashatus, An Interview with the Late Great, Pete Gray Pennsylvania Heritage (Spring 2003).
- William C. Kashatus, One-Armed Wonder: Pete Gray, Wartime Baseball and the American Dream (Jefferson, NC: McFarland, 1995).
- John Klima, The Game Must Go On: Hank Greenberg, Pete Gray and the Great Days of Baseball on the Home Front in WW II (New York: St. Martin's Press, 2015).

== See also ==
- Jim Abbott
- Chad Bentz
- Hugh Daily
- Bert Shepard
- Eddie Gaedel
- Mordecai Brown
- Ed Dundon
- Dummy Hoy
- Curtis Pride
- Monty Stratton
- Bob Wickman
- Tom Sunkel
- Antonio Alfonseca
- Lou Brissie
