= The Blue Yonder =

1985 film

- Directed by: Mark Rosman
- Written by: Mark Rosman
- Produced by: Alan Shapiro; Annette Handley; Susan B. Handley
- Starring: Peter Coyote; Huckleberry Fox; Art Carney; Dennis Lipscomb; Joe Flood
- Cinematography: Hiro Narita
- Edited by: Betsy Blankett
- Music by: David Shire
- Production company: Walt Disney Home Video
- Distributed by: Walt Disney Television
- Release date: November 17, 1985
- Running time: 89 minutes
- Country: United States
- Language: English

The Blue Yonder is a 1985 American science fiction adventure film directed by Mark Rosman and starring Peter Coyote, Huckleberry Fox, Art Carney, Dennis Lipscomb, and Joe Flood. It was written by Mark Rosman and produced by Alan Shapiro and Annette Handley. The film is also known as Time Flyer. The film's premise is about Jonathan Knicks, an 11-year-old boy who travels back in time from 1985 to 1927 via a time machine built by family friend Henry Coogan from the theoretical blueprints of Jonathan's own grandfather. There Jonathan meets his less than illustrious grandfather, Max, and must desperately find a way to prevent Max's fatal attempt at a solo trans-Atlantic flight and invariably change the course of history in the process. Max had perished trying to beat Charles Lindbergh in being the first to fly across the Atlantic Ocean solo.

== Plot ==
Eleven-year-old Jonathan Knicks is daydreaming while playing an outfield position of a youth baseball game. He doesn't notice a flyball headed his way, and it bounces off his glove resulting in an error and a celebratory win for the opposing team.

Later, Jonathan heads to the home of Henry Coogan, a longtime family friend and once best-friend of his late grandfather Max Knickerbocker. At Henry's house, Jonathan catches a glimpse of some blueprints labeled, "Time Traveler Project" and the outline of a skeleton key used as an ignition key. Henry briefly explains the blueprint was something Jonathan's grandfather invented but never got a chance to build. Henry proceeds to gift Jonathan an unpainted toy model of a biplane, similar in style to the type his grandfather used to fly in the 1920s. That evening, while Jonathan is having dinner at his home, his father explains that his grandfather was a idealistic dreamer who died in a crazy exploit, and that Henry makes him out to be something more than he was.

One day, Jonathan is visiting Henry in his basement decorated with old pictures. Henry explains that a solo transatlantic flight was among the most daring challenges in his day, and that the person to first successfully fly solo across the Atlantic was Charles Lindbergh. Jonathan's grandfather had attempted the feat four days before Lindbergh but had perished during the trip. His grandfather had taken a northern route against his own instincts, which Henry believed is what likely led to the fatal outcome of the trip. Henry makes a vow that he will get the world to remember the name Max Knickerbocker despite the failed transatlantic flight attempt.

Sometime later, Jonathan comes to visit Henry but discovers that Henry had a heart attack and is bedridden. Henry explains to Jonathan that he built the time machine that Max once conceived on blueprints. At exactly 7:30 a.m. the following day a "window in time" would open that would allow the machine to function and take an occupant into the past to save Max. Henry also explains that this "window in time" would only be open temporarily, and the traveler would need to return to the future before it closes or they would vanish forever. Given Henry's medical condition, he is no longer able to make the trip, and discourages Jonathan from attempting the trip, saying the machine is untested and the trip would be too risky.

Jonathan wakes up early the next day and goes through a window in Max's house to activate the time machine using a skeleton key he found hanging nearby. When a countdown timer hits zero, the machine activates with various gears and sounds and spins rapidly taking him to May 14, 1927. When he emerges, he walks into downtown while 1927-era people stare at him with his anachronistic 1985 clothing. Jonathan buys a few candy bars and a newspaper with a dollar bill from the future, but leaves before the vendor notices. The vendor flags the local police captain claiming he was passed a counterfeit bill.

With vague directions of where his grandfather might be, Jonathan travels a few miles out of town and sleeps in a barn. He awakens to the crashing sound of a gyroplane that his grandfather Max was testing and subsequently crashed into the barn. Jonathan discovers his grandfather is an eccentric inventor, but a kind man who takes in Jonathan believing he's a runaway.

Meanwhile, a bootlegger named Finch and a corrupt police captain find the time machine in Finch's house (which would become Henry's house in the future). They make the connection to a strange boy who arrived in downtown with a futuristic counterfeit bill. Finch wants to find the boy to get the key to the time machine to exploit it for gambling and financial gain.

Jonathan connects with his grandfather over breakfast and meets his grandmother who is currently pregnant with a child that will become his father. Max shows Jonathan several of his inventions, including blueprints for the Time Traveler machine. He also shows Jonathan his biplane, which he calls The Blue Yonder, that he intends to fly across the Atlantic. Max takes Jonathan on a flight in which he performs several barrel rolls and flies inverted. He also allows Jonathan to take the stick and fly.

Later that evening, Jonathan tries to convince Max not to go on his transatlantic flight. When he fails, he tells Max that he is his grandson from the future. When Max doesn't believe him, he attempts to take Max to show him the time machine, but they discover it's missing because Finch moved it to a different room. Max is skeptical of Jonathan's story, so in a last ditch effort, Jonathan tells Max the story about how an American Legion plane will crash the following morning in a nearby pond and will kill both pilots. When this even occurs as he described, Max realizes the probability of guessing such an outcome is far too remote and now believes he's from the future. While viewing the crash scene, Jonathan is spotted by Finch and the police officer, and they arrest him, but not before Jonathan secretly puts the key for the time machine into Max's pocket.

Later that evening, after comparing the key Jonathan gave him with the one in his time machine blueprint and finding they're the same, Max breaks Jonathan out of jail. They return to Finch's basement and find the time machine. After embracing Jonathan as his grandson and seriously considering Jonathan's warning not to attempt the transatlantic flight, Max takes him home. In the middle of the night, remembering that Jonathan said he would fail by taking the northern route for the crossing, Max decides to take an alternate route. The next morning, Jonathan wakes up and finds a note from Max saying he's going to attempt the flight and wishes him off. Jonathan races to the airfield to stop Max but is too late. Finch and the police officer are there, and begin to chase Jonathan who heads back toward the time machine. With only seconds to spare, Jonathan activates the time machine and disappears with Finch and the police captain barely missing him. A group of police officials file into the room discovering bootlegged liquor stash, and begin to arrest Finch and the corrupt police captain.

Jonathan emerges back in 1985 saddened that he failed his mission to save his grandfather. While walking near some baseball fields, a baseball lands near an aviation memorial statue and the kids ask if Jonathan can throw the ball back. As he's picking it up, he notices the plaque has changed from before his trip. It now credits Max Knickerbocker for making the "nearest successful Atlantic crossing before Lindbergh" and that The Blue Yonder plane was found off the French coast, indicating that while Max still died, he had successfully traversed the Atlantic before Lindbergh. Inspired by this new knowledge, Jonathan picks up the ball and lobs it into the air with a renewed force he was unable to achieve in the beginning of the movie.

== Cast ==
- Peter Coyote as Max Knickerbocker
- Huckleberry Fox as Jonathan Knicks
- Art Carney as Henry Coogan
- Dennis Lipscomb as Finch
- Joe Flood as Leary
- Mittie Smith as Helen Knickerbocker
- Frank Simons as Young Coogan
- Stu Klitsner as Mr. Knicks
- Morgan Upton as Police Captain
- Bennett Cale as Dooley
- Cyril Clayton as Drunk
- Charles Adams as News Vendor
- Gretchen Grant as Mrs. Knicks
- Sean Mattimore as "Hey look" kid when Jonathan comes to town

== Alternate version ==
As part of The Disney Sunday Movie, the film was renamed Time Flyer and had footage that was cut in the VHS releases.

== The Blue Yonder Biplane ==
The Blue Yonder biplane shown in the film is a Boeing Stearman with an added cowl. However, this model of Stearman was not constructed until the 1930s. In the film, it is said Max Knickerbocker designed and constructed the plane himself sometime before 1927.

== Reception ==
The movie was given 3 out of 5 stars in Creature Feature by John Stanley. He praised the twist ending and the movie's handling of the time paradoxes. The Los Angeles Times also gave the movie a positive review, stating that while it lacked a big budget, "writer-director Mark Rosman effectively extracts charm from the simplicity", and praising the portrayal of the grandfather/grandson relationship.
