= Florence Montgomery =

English novelist and children's writer

Florence Montgomery (1843–1923) was an English novelist and children's writer. Her 1869 novel Misunderstood was enjoyed by Lewis Carroll and George du Maurier, and by Vladimir Nabokov as a child. Her writings are pious in tone and set in fashionable society.

== Early life and family ==
She was born Florence Harriet Montgomery in Chelsea, London, on 17 January 1843, the second of the seven surviving children of Admiral Alexander Leslie Montgomery (1807–1888) and his wife Caroline Rose Campbell (1818–1909) of Hampton Court, Middlesex. Her father was also an MP. He succeeded to a baronetcy in 1878. He was a cousin of the novelist Baroness von Tautphoeus (1807–1893). Her cousin, Sibyl Montgomery (died 1935), was the first wife of the Marquess of Queensberry and mother of Lord Alfred Douglas.

Florence Montgomery's story-telling abilities were first tried on younger brothers and sisters, but the novelist G. J. Whyte-Melville saw a story of hers printed for a charity bazaar, about a golden-haired girl whose mother dies of scarlet fever, and advised that it should be published. "A Very Simple Story" appeared commercially in 1867 with illustrations by Sibyl Montgomery.

== Works ==
Montgomery drew a distinction between her stories for children and her stories about children, which were intended for an adult audience as an encouragement to recognize children's merits. Misunderstood (1869), for instance, features an unperceptive father and a son thoughtful and loving before dying young. An edition illustrated by George du Maurier followed in 1873. Writing to Charles L. Dodgson (Lewis Carroll) about that time, du Maurier remarked, "Miss Florence Montgomery is a very charming and sympathetic young lady, the daughter of the admiral of that ilk. I am, like you, a very great admirer of 'Misunderstood,' and cried buckets over it."

Seaforth (1878) is a full-length novel for adults. Almost all her works are pious in tone and set in fashionable society. They continued to sell into the 20th century, but by the end of that century they appear to have lost their appeal. One reference book of 1990 comments that "her later works, such as Seaforth, 1878, and Colonel Norton, 1895, have vapid plots and characters." Charlotte Mitchell, in her entry for the Oxford Dictionary of National Biography, notes "an undercurrent of animosity against the modern young woman... for example Lady Jane Marton in Tony: a Sketch (1898), a hard, selfish, bicycling creature..." Vladimir Nabokov, on the other hand, recalls in his memoir Speak Memory that Misunderstood was the first English book his mother read to him, and "the fate of its hero Humphrey used to bring a more specialised lump to one's throat than anything in Dickens or Daudet."

Almost all of Montgomery's novels were translated into German and French, and some into Italian, Dutch and Russian. Misunderstood has had two film adaptations: the Italian film Incompreso in 1966, and the American film Misunderstood in 1984.

== Personal life ==
Montgomery never married, and had no children. She lived her whole life in the family home in Belgravia, London, along with two likewise unmarried sisters.

== Death ==
Montgomery died of breast cancer on 8 October 1923.

== Bibliography ==
- A Very Simple Story (1866)
- Peggy and Other Tales (1868)
- Misunderstood (1869)
- Thrown Together (1872)
- Thwarted (1873)
- Wild Mike and his Victim (1874)
- Seaforth (1878)
- The Blue Veil (1883)
- Transformed (1886)
- The Fisherman's Daughter (1888)
- Colonel Norton (1895)
- Tony (1897)
- Prejudged (1900)
- An Unshared Secret and Other Stories (1903)
- Cats and Kitts (1910)
- Behind the Scenes in a Schoolroom (1914)
