= The Perfect Man (2005 film) =

2005 film by Mark Rosman

- Theatrical release poster
- Directed by: Mark Rosman
- Screenplay by: Gina Wendkos
- Story by: Michael McQuown; Heather Robinson; Katherine Torpey
- Produced by: Marc Platt; Dawn Wolfrom; Susan Duff
- Starring: Hilary Duff; Heather Locklear; Chris Noth; Mike O'Malley
- Cinematography: John R. Leonetti
- Edited by: Cara Silverman
- Music by: Christophe Beck
- Production companies: Universal Pictures; Marc Platt Productions
- Distributed by: Universal Pictures
- Release date: June 17, 2005 (United States)
- Running time: 101 minutes
- Country: United States
- Language: English
- Budget: $10 million
- Box office: $19.8 million

The Perfect Man is a 2005 American romantic comedy film directed by Mark Rosman and written by Gina Wendkos. It stars Hilary Duff, Heather Locklear, and Chris Noth. In the film, Duff's character creates a secret admirer, the perfect man, for her mother, played by Locklear.

The film was theatrically released in the United States on June 17, 2005, by Universal Pictures. It was widely panned by critics and grossed $19.8 million against a production budget of $10 million.

== Plot ==
Single mother Jean relocates every time she gets her heart broken, much to her teenage daughter Holly's dismay. After moving to Brooklyn, Holly devises a plan to invent a secret admirer for her, so she will be happy and not need to relocate again.

Overhearing her friend Amy's uncle Ben ordering flowers for a woman, Holly uses his advice on women (which she gets by telling him she needs help for a school project on romance), sending her mother orchids, other gifts and love notes, and is soon communicating with her mother as a fictitious admirer (who Holly names Ben) via the Internet.

As her mother becomes more interested, Holly has to find a photo of this admirer. She sends one of the real Ben, and then devises the reason why they cannot meet in person: he is working in China.

While she is developing the online romance between her mother and fake Ben, and preventing her mother and the real Ben from meeting in person, she finds herself drawn to a cute, artistic boy in her class, Adam, but is unwilling to get close to anyone as she has been uprooted so often.

Holly spends more time with Ben while picking his brain for romance tips. She slowly comes to realize that he really is her mother's "perfect man".

Holly asks for Adam's help to disguise himself as Ben on the telephone to break up with Jean. But he fails, as he is harboring feelings for Holly and ends up telling Jean the opposite of what was planned. The following day, when Holly confronts Adam angrily because of this failure, Adam tells her that he just got distracted, then reveals his feelings for Holly by kissing her.

That night, Lenny, an awkward man infatuated with Jean, proposes to her, and she replies with a "maybe". Holly, believing Ben the better choice, disguises herself as Ben's secretary and arranges a meeting between Ben and her mother. The next day, when Holly thinks Ben is marrying someone else, she disrupts the wedding to tell Ben he should be with her mother - who he does not know about - unaware he was there as the bride's friend.

A disappointed Ben follows Holly out, and she admits the full story. She then goes to where Jean thinks Ben is meeting her for the first time and confesses the whole ruse to Jean, who takes it terribly; Holly insists that Jean is perfect the way she is and does not need a man. Days pass, and Holly and her mother keep distant.

A humiliated Holly begs Jean for them to move again, and they start to pack. Adam, for what he thinks is the last time, goes to Holly's apartment, giving her mother a drawing he made telling Holly that he will always be there for her.

Inspired, Jean logs onto the Internet under Holly's screen name and talks to Adam. He, thinking it is Holly, says that her mom sets a bad example by getting up and leaving when things get bad. Jean decides to stay, finding a new job and trying to rebuild her life without running away. She also apologizes to her daughter, showing her Adam's drawing.

Meanwhile, Ben is inspired by what Holly told him about her mother, and with her help, Jean and Ben finally meet and Jean finds her "perfect man". Holly is on the road to her perfect man as well, finally opening up and admitting her feelings for Adam. Adam and Holly go to their first school dance together.

== Cast ==
- Hilary Duff as Holly Hamilton, a girl who hates moving to another city every time her mother ends a relationship and create a "perfect man" through fake letters to force Jean not to break her heart with another real man.
- Heather Locklear as Jean Hamilton, Holly's mother, a single baker desperately seeking love, who relocates every time she gets her heart broken by another man.
- Chris Noth as Ben Cooper, Amy's uncle, owner of the River Bistro, and Holly's inspiration for the perfect man she creates for her mother.
- Mike O'Malley as Lenny Horton, employee at the bakery where Jean works.
- Ben Feldman as Adam Forrest, one of Holly's classmates and friends. Adam has a crush on Holly.
- Vanessa Lengies as Amy Pearl, Holly's classmate and best friend.
- Caroline Rhea as Gloria, Jean's friend and co-worker.
- Carson Kressley as Lance, one of Ben's employees, a gay man also looking for love.
- Kym Whitley as Dolores, Jean's friend and employer.
- Aria Wallace as Zoe Hamilton, Holly's seven-year-old sister.
- Michelle Nolden as Amber
- Maggie Castle as Wichita girl

== Production ==
Shooting for the film began in May 2004 and was based on screenwriter Heather Robinson's life in Tucson, Arizona, and ended the following July. Carson Kressley missed two days of shooting on his reality makeover show, Queer Eye, due to filming on The Perfect Man overrunning. Queer Eye explained his absence by claiming the fashion expert was busy shopping. On the weekends, Duff was busy recording songs for her then-upcoming self-titled album.

== Reception ==
=== Box office ===
The Perfect Man grossed $16.5 million in the United States and Canada, and $3.2 million in other territories, for a worldwide total of $19.8 million, more than doubling its budget of $10 million.

=== Critical response ===
On the review aggregator website Rotten Tomatoes, 6% of 128 critics' reviews are positive, with an average rating of 3.4/10. The website's consensus reads: "Preposterous and predictable, The Perfect Man manages few laughs with its poorly paced sitcom script, cookie-cutter characters and contrived plotting." Metacritic, which uses a weighted average, assigned the film a score of 27 out of 100, based on 29 critics, indicating "generally unfavorable" reviews.

== Soundtrack ==
The Perfect Man (Original Motion Picture Soundtrack)

Soundtrack album by various artists
- Released: June 14, 2005
- Recorded: 2005
- Length: 44:30
- Label: Curb

The Perfect Man (Original Motion Picture Soundtrack) is the soundtrack album to the film of the same name, released on June 14, 2005, by independent label Curb Records.

=== Track listing ===
No.	Title	Performer(s)	Length
1.	"Collide"	Howie Day	3:10
2.	"I Will Learn to Love Again"	Kaci Battaglia	3:15
3.	"Better Than This"	Kimberley Locke	3:21
4.	"Real Life Fairytale"	Plumb	2:19
5.	"Let It Go"	Jadon Lavik	2:44
6.	"The Real Thing"	Sara Overall	3:14
7.	"If You Got What You Came For"	Beth Thornley	4:05
8.	"Make Room"	Grits	3:38
9.	"Mr. Roboto"	Dennis DeYoung	3:15
10.	"Lady"	Dennis DeYoung	4:06
11.	"Babe"	Dennis DeYoung	3:53
12.	"The Best of Times"	Dennis DeYoung	3:25

=== Reception ===
Basshunter covered song "I Will Learn to Love Again" by Kaci Battaglia on his 2009 album Bass Generation.

== Awards and nominations ==
2005 Teen Choice Awards

- Best Actress Comedy (Hilary Duff) - (The Perfect Man & Cheaper By The Dozen 2)
  - Lost to Rachel McAdams - (The Family Stone & Wedding Crashers)

2005 Golden Raspberry Awards

- Worst Actress - Nomination - (Hilary Duff) - (The Perfect Man & Cheaper By The Dozen 2)
  - Lost to Jenny McCarthy - Dirty Love

== Home media ==
The film was released on DVD on November 1, 2005, and on Blu-Ray on April 17, 2018.
