= Huckleberry Fox =

American child actor and scientist (1974–2024)

- Born: George Miller Fox; October 6, 1974; Philadelphia, Pennsylvania, U.S.
- Died: November 3, 2024 (aged 50); Washington, D.C., U.S.
- Occupations: Actor and scientist
- Notable work: Terms of Endearment

George Miller "Huckleberry" Fox (October 6, 1974 – November 3, 2024) was an American child actor who performed in Terms of Endearment (1983), American Dreamer (1984), Misunderstood (1984), Konrad (1985), and the Disney film The Blue Yonder (1985). He played Jamie in Tales from the Darkside's "The Cutty Black Sow" episode (1988). In adulthood, after graduating from Cornell University with a master's degree in animal science, and a Ph.D. in plant medicine from the University of Florida, he became a diplomat with the United States Department of Agriculture.

Fox died of prostate cancer in Washington, D.C. on November 3, 2024, at the age of 50.

== Bibliography ==
- Holmstrom, John. The Moving Picture Boy: An International Encyclopaedia from 1895 to 1995. Norwich, Michael Russell, 1996, p. 394.
