= Misunderstood (1966 film) =

1966 film

- Film poster
- Directed by: Luigi Comencini
- Screenplay by: Leonardo Benvenuti; Piero De Bernardi; Lucia Drudi Demby
- Story by: Giuseppe Mangione; Florence Montgomery
- Produced by: Angelo Rizzoli
- Starring: Anthony Quayle
- Cinematography: Armando Nannuzzi
- Edited by: Nino Baragli
- Music by: Fiorenzo Carpi
- Release date: 19 December 1966
- Running time: 105 minutes
- Country: Italy
- Language: Italian

Misunderstood (Italian: Incompreso) is a 1966 Italian drama film directed by Luigi Comencini. It was entered into the 1967 Cannes Film Festival.

== Plot ==
Duncombe is the UK Consul General in Florence, Italy. He becomes a widower when his two sons, Andrew and Miles, are still children. Andrew, the elder, apparently reacts with adult maturity to the loss of his mother, looking after little Miles in an attempt to find a way out of his early heart-crushing loss. Miles constantly blames Andrew for his own mischievous behavior, but his brother valiantly takes said blame, as his personality is that of a grown up, or at least that is what he tries to be. Because of the demands of his career, the father is often absent, both physically and emotionally, especially toward Andrew. It will be at the end that Duncombe will acknowledge his mistakes when finding himself at a father's point of no return.

== Cast ==
- Anthony Quayle (dubbed by Romolo Valli) as John Duncombe
- Stefano Colagrande as Andrew
- Simone Giannozzi as Miles
- John Sharp as Uncle William
- Adriana Facchetti as Luisa
- Anna Maria Nardini as little girl in a movie theatre
- Silla Bettini as a Judo teacher
- Rino Benini as Casimirio
- Giorgia Moll as Miss Judy
- Graziella Granata as Dora
