= Rudolf Sieczyński =

Austrian composer

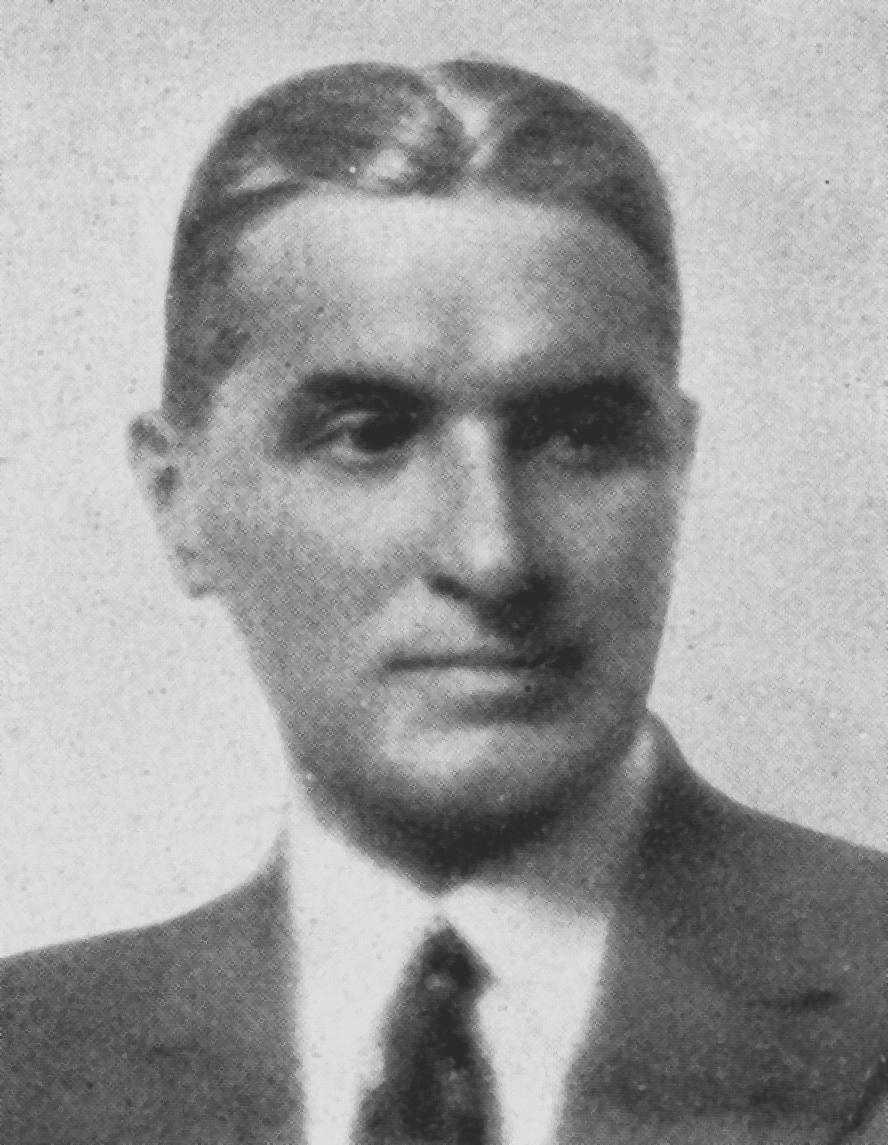
Rudolf Sieczyński (1937).

Rudolf Sieczyński (February 23, 1879, Vienna – May 5, 1952, Vienna) was an Austrian composer of Polish ancestry. His fame today rests almost exclusively on the nostalgic Viennese song Wien, du Stadt meiner Träume (Vienna, City of My Dreams), whose melody and lyrics he wrote in 1914. A well-known recording was made in 1957 by Elisabeth Schwarzkopf with Otto Ackermann conducting the Philharmonia Orchestra. The song was featured in the soundtrack of the Stanley Kubrick film Eyes Wide Shut.
