= Vienna, City of My Dreams (song) =

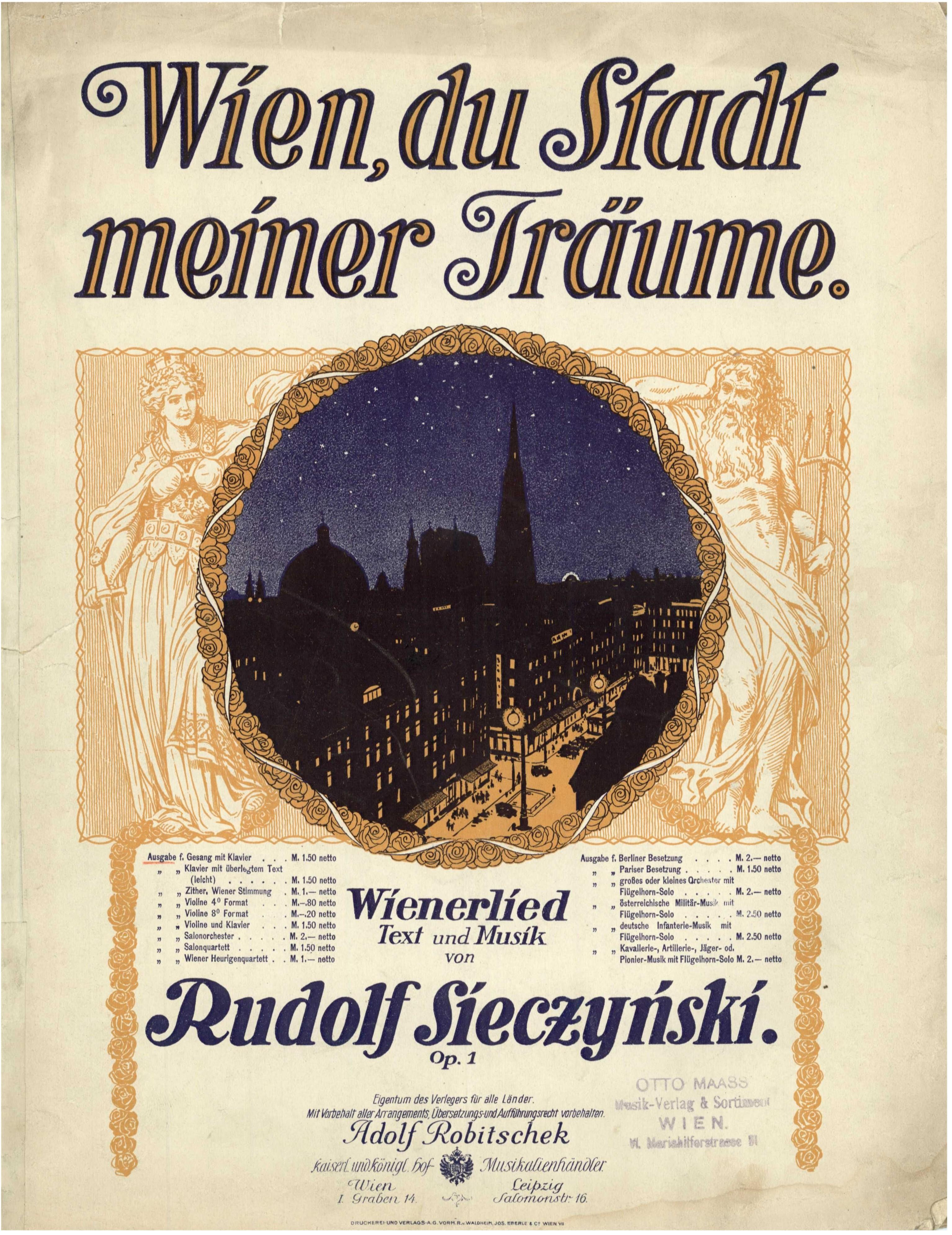
- Sheet music cover, 1914

Song
- Released: 1914
- Genre: Pop
- Songwriters: Rudolf Sieczyński; Edward Teschemacher

"Vienna, City of My Dreams" (German:"Wien, du Stadt meiner Träume") is a 1914 song composed by the Austrian Rudolf Sieczyński who also wrote the lyrics. The 1957 film Vienna, City of My Dreams takes its title from the song.

With its lyrics translated into English by Edward Lockton (Edward Teschemacher), it enjoyed popularity in Britain and the United States. Richard Tauber performed the song in the 1935 British operetta film Heart's Desire.
