= Marion Segal Freed =

American film producer (1934–2011)

- Born: Marion Sobel; July 18, 1934
- Died: December 22, 2011 (aged 77)
- Occupations: Film producer, editor, screenwriter
- Spouse(s): George Segal (m. 1956; div. 1983) Herb Freed (m. 1985)
- Children: 2
- Relatives: Susan Harris (step-sister)

Marion Segal Freed (née Sobel; July 18, 1934 – December 22, 2011) was an American film producer, editor and screenwriter.

== Education ==
In 1977, Freed graduated from Center for Advanced Film Studies, American Film Institute.

== Career ==
Freed started her film career as a producer and editor on such movies as Russian Roulette, Fun With Dick and Jane, Carbon Copy, Badlands and Days of Heaven.

In 1986, Freed was the co-founder and Creative Director of Bellrock Entertainment, Inc.

== Filmography ==
- 1975 Russian Roulette – associate producer, associate editor.
- 1977 Fun with Dick and Jane – associate producer.
- 1981 Carbon Copy – editor, producer.
- 1996 Subterfuge – writer, co-producer
- 1999 Paradise Lost – writer, producer, editor.

== Personal life ==
In 1956, Freed married George Segal, an actor. They have two daughters, Elizabeth Segal (born 1962) and Polly Segal (born 1966). In 1983, Freed divorced George Segal after 25 years. In 1985, Freed married director Herb Freed. Freed was the step-sister to American television producer, editor and screenwriter Susan Harris, most notably of the hit show The Golden Girls.

On December 22, 2011, after a long illness, Freed died in Century City, California. She was 77.
