= George Segal =

American actor (1934–2021)

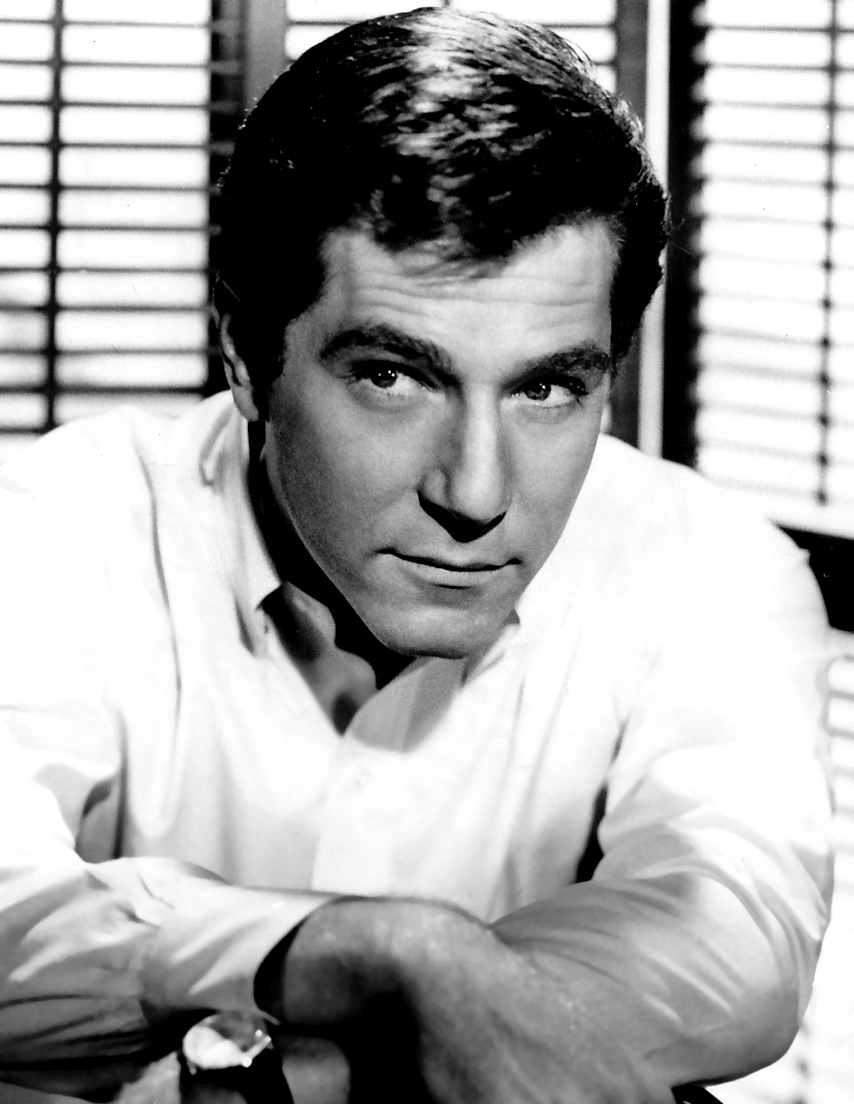
- Segal in 1965
- Born: George Segal Jr. February 13, 1934; New York City, U.S.
- Died: March 23, 2021 (aged 87); Santa Rosa, California, U.S.
- Education: Columbia University (BA)
- Occupation: Actor
- Years active: 1955–2021
- Spouses: Marion Sobel (m. 1956; div. 1983); Linda Rogoff (m. 1983; died 1996); Sonia Schultz Greenbaum (m. 1998)
- Children: 2
- Awards: See below

George Segal Jr. (February 13, 1934 – March 23, 2021) was an American actor and musician. He became popular in the 1960s and 1970s for playing both dramatic and comedic roles. After first rising to prominence with roles in acclaimed films such as Ship of Fools (1965) and King Rat (1965), he co-starred in the drama Who's Afraid of Virginia Woolf? (1966).

Through the next decade and a half, Segal consistently starred in notable films across a variety of genres including The Quiller Memorandum (1966), The St. Valentine's Day Massacre (1967), No Way to Treat a Lady (1968), The Bridge at Remagen (1968), Where's Poppa? (1970), The Owl and the Pussycat (1970), Born to Win (1971), The Hot Rock (1972), Blume in Love (1973), A Touch of Class (1973), California Split (1974), The Terminal Man (1974), The Duchess and the Dirtwater Fox (1976), Fun with Dick and Jane (1977), Who Is Killing the Great Chefs of Europe? (1978), The Last Married Couple in America (1980), and Carbon Copy (1981). He was one of the first American film actors to rise to leading man status with an unchanged Jewish surname, helping pave the way for other major actors of his generation.

Later in his career, he appeared in supporting roles in films such as Stick (1985), Look Who's Talking (1989), For the Boys (1991), The Mirror Has Two Faces (1996), Flirting with Disaster (1996), The Cable Guy (1996), 2012 (2009), and Love & Other Drugs (2010).

He was nominated for the Academy Award for Best Supporting Actor for his performance in Who's Afraid of Virginia Woolf? and won two Golden Globe Awards, including the Golden Globe Award for Best Actor in a Motion Picture Musical or Comedy for his performance in A Touch of Class.

On television, he had regular roles in two popular sitcoms, playing Jack Gallo on Just Shoot Me! (1997–2003) and Albert "Pops" Solomon on The Goldbergs (2013–2021).

Segal also performed on the banjo, making music recordings and playing the instrument in some of his film and television appearances.

== Early life ==
George Segal Jr. was born on February 13, 1934, in New York City, the youngest of four children, to Fannie Blanche Segal (née Bodkin) and George Segal Sr., a malt and hop agent. He spent much of his childhood in Great Neck, New York. All four of Segal's grandparents were Russian-Jewish immigrants, and his maternal grandparents changed their surname from Slobodkin to Bodkin. A paternal great-grandfather ran for governor of Massachusetts as a socialist. His oldest brother, John, worked in the hops brokerage business and was an innovator in the cultivation of new hop varieties; he had a farm in Grandview, Washington where George often helped in the summers. The middle brother, Fred, was a screenwriter; and his sister Greta died of pneumonia before Segal was born.

Segal's family was Jewish, but he was raised in a secular household. When asked if he had had a bar mitzvah, he said:

I'm afraid not. I went to a Passover Seder at Groucho Marx's once and he kept saying, "When do we get to the wine?" So that's my [Jewish] experience. I went to [a friend's] bar mitzvah, and that was the only time I was in Temple Beth Shalom. [Jewish life] wasn't happening that much at the time. People's car tires were slashed in front of the temple. I was once kicked down a flight of stairs by some kids from [the local parochial school].

Segal became interested in acting at the age of nine, when he saw Alan Ladd in This Gun for Hire. "I knew the revolver and the trench coat were an illusion and I didn't care," said Segal. "I liked the sense of adventure and control." He also started playing the banjo at a young age, later stating: "I started off with the ukulele when I was a kid in Great Neck. A friend had a red Harold Teen model; it won my heart. When I got to high school, I realized you couldn't play in a band with a ukulele, so I moved on to the four-string banjo."

When his father died in 1947, Segal moved to New York City with his mother. He graduated from George School, a Quaker boarding school in Pennsylvania, in 1951 and attended Haverford College. He graduated from Columbia College of Columbia University in 1955 with a Bachelor of Arts in performing arts and drama. He played banjo at Haverford and also at Columbia, where he played with a dixieland jazz band that had several different names. When he booked a gig, he billed the group as Bruno Lynch and his Imperial Jazz Band. The group, which later settled on the name Red Onion Jazz Band, played at Segal's first wedding.

Segal served in the United States Army during the Korean War. While there, he played in a band called Corporal Bruno's Sad Sack Six.

== Career ==
=== Early roles and success ===
After college and the army, Segal eventually studied at the Actors Studio with Lee Strasberg and at HB Studio with Uta Hagen and got a job as an understudy in the 1956 off-Broadway production of The Iceman Cometh starring Jason Robards. He appeared in Antony and Cleopatra for Joseph Papp and joined an improvisational group called The Premise, which performed at a Bleecker Street coffeehouse and whose ranks included Buck Henry and Theodore J. Flicker. Segal continued to perform on Broadway with roles in Gideon (1961–62) by Paddy Chayefsky, which ran for 236 performances, as well as Rattle of a Simple Man (1963), an adaptation of a British hit, with Tammy Grimes and Edward Woodward.

He was signed to a Columbia Pictures contract in 1961, making his film debut in The Young Doctors. Segal made several television appearances in the early 1960s, including Alfred Hitchcock Presents, Armstrong Circle Theatre, and Naked City, and appeared in the well-known World War II film The Longest Day (1962). He also had a small role in Act One (1963) and a more prominent part in the western Invitation to a Gunfighter (1964) alongside Yul Brynner.

Segal came to Hollywood from New York City to star in a TV series with Robert Taylor that never aired. Nonetheless, he joined the cast of Columbia Pictures' medical drama The New Interns (1964), and the studio then put him under long-term contract. The role ultimately earned him the Golden Globe Award for New Star of the Year, alongside Harve Presnell and Chaim Topol.

=== Critical acclaim ===
In 1965, Segal played an egocentric painter in an ensemble cast led by Vivien Leigh and Lee Marvin in Stanley Kramer's acclaimed drama Ship of Fools, which was nominated for the Academy Award for Best Picture. The same year, he also had the title role of a scheming POW in the well-regarded war drama King Rat (a role originally meant for Frank Sinatra) and received acclaim for both performances. In other notable film appearances, he played a secret service agent on assignment in Berlin in The Quiller Memorandum (1966) (a role originally meant for Charlton Heston), an Algerian paratrooper who becomes a leader of the FLN in Lost Command (1966), and a Cagney-esque gangster in Roger Corman's The St. Valentine's Day Massacre (1967).

Segal also appeared in several prominent television films, playing Biff in an acclaimed production of Death of a Salesman (1966) next to Lee J. Cobb, a gangster in an adaptation of The Desperate Hours (1967), and George in an adaptation of Of Mice and Men (1968). The latter two films were both directed by Ted Kotcheff, with whom he worked again several times.

Segal was loaned to Warner Bros. for Mike Nichols' directorial debut Who's Afraid of Virginia Woolf? (1966), adapted from the Edward Albee play. The film has garnered critical approval from the time of its release onward. Nichols had previously directed Segal in a 1964 Off-Broadway play titled The Knack and cast him again in Woolf after Robert Redford had turned down the role. In the four-person ensemble piece, Segal played the young faculty member, Nick, alongside Elizabeth Taylor, Richard Burton, and Sandy Dennis. The film received an Academy Award nomination for Best Picture and was later selected for the National Film Registry, and Segal was nominated for an Oscar and a Golden Globe.

=== Leading man ===
For over ten years after his success with Woolf, Segal received many notable film roles, often working with major filmmakers and becoming a significant figure in the New Hollywood movement. He starred in Carl Reiner's celebrated dark comedy Where's Poppa? (1970), played the lead role in Sidney Lumet's Bye Bye Braverman (1968), starred with Robert Redford in Peter Yates's diamond heist comedy The Hot Rock (1972), starred in the title role of Paul Mazursky's acclaimed romantic comedy Blume in Love (1973), and starred alongside Elliott Gould as a gambling addict in Robert Altman's California Split (1974).

In one of his most successful roles, Segal played a philandering husband in Melvin Frank's continental romantic comedy A Touch of Class (1973) opposite Glenda Jackson. The film was nominated for the Academy Award for Best Picture, Jackson won an Oscar for her performance, and Segal won the Golden Globe Award for Best Actor – Motion Picture Musical or Comedy, which was the second Golden Globe of his career.

During this time, he had many other leading roles in various genres. He played a perplexed police detective in No Way to Treat a Lady (1968), a war-weary platoon commander in The Bridge at Remagen (1969), a man laying waste to his marriage in Loving (1970), and a hairdresser-turned-junkie in Born to Win (1971). The Owl and the Pussycat (1970), a romantic comedy starring Segal and Barbra Streisand and written by his former improv teammate Buck Henry, was particularly popular; and though Segal played against type as a dangerous computer scientist in The Terminal Man (1974), he used his popular appeal as a card shark in The Duchess and the Dirtwater Fox (1976), as a suburbanite-turned-bank robber in Fun with Dick and Jane (1977), as a heroic ride inspector in Rollercoaster (1977), and as a wealthy serial restaurant entrepreneur in Who Is Killing the Great Chefs of Europe? (1978). Other films starring Segal from this time include The Girl Who Couldn't Say No (1968), Russian Roulette (1975), and The Black Bird (1975).

Segal co-hosted the 48th Academy Awards in 1976, alongside Gene Kelly, Goldie Hawn, Walter Matthau, and Robert Shaw.

During the 1970s and 1980s, Segal appeared as a frequent guest on The Tonight Show Starring Johnny Carson, and occasionally as a guest host. His appearances were marked by eccentric banter with Johnny Carson and were usually punctuated by bursts of banjo playing.

=== Mid-career difficulties ===
Segal reunited with his Touch of Class co-star Jackson and director Frank in another European-set romantic comedy, Lost and Found (1979), but the film was not a success. Neither was The Last Married Couple in America (1980) with Natalie Wood. Segal pulled out of the lead role in Blake Edwards' hit comedy 10 (1979), resulting in his being replaced by Dudley Moore and sued by Edwards.

With a few exceptions, in films such as Denzel Washington's film debut Carbon Copy (1981), Burt Reynolds's crime drama Stick (1985), and the popular family comedy Look Who's Talking (1989), Segal received fewer prominent roles in the 1980s. Instead, he began to star more frequently in television films, such as The Deadly Game (1982) for which he received a CableAce Award nomination for best actor in a theatrical or non-musical production, The Cold Room (1984), and The Zany Adventures of Robin Hood (1984). He also starred in two short-lived television series, the semi-autobiographical sitcom Take Five (1987) and the crime drama Murphy's Law (1988–89). In 1985, he returned to Broadway in a short-lived production of Requiem for a Heavyweight by Rod Serling and in 1990 toured in a play called Double Act.

He later reflected on his career trajectory:

In the first 10 years, I was playing all different kinds of things. I loved the variety, and never had the sense of being a leading man but a character actor. Then I got frozen into this "urban" character. About the time of "The Last Married Couple in America" (1980) I remember Natalie (Wood) saying to me ... "It's one typed role after another, and pretty soon you forget everything. You forget why you're here, why you're doing it." Then my marriage started to fall apart ... I was disenchanted, I was turning in on myself, I was doing a lot of self-destructive things ... there were drugs ... I'm also sure I was guilty of spoiled behavior. I think it's impossible when that star rush comes not to get a little full of yourself, which is what I was.

=== Later career ===
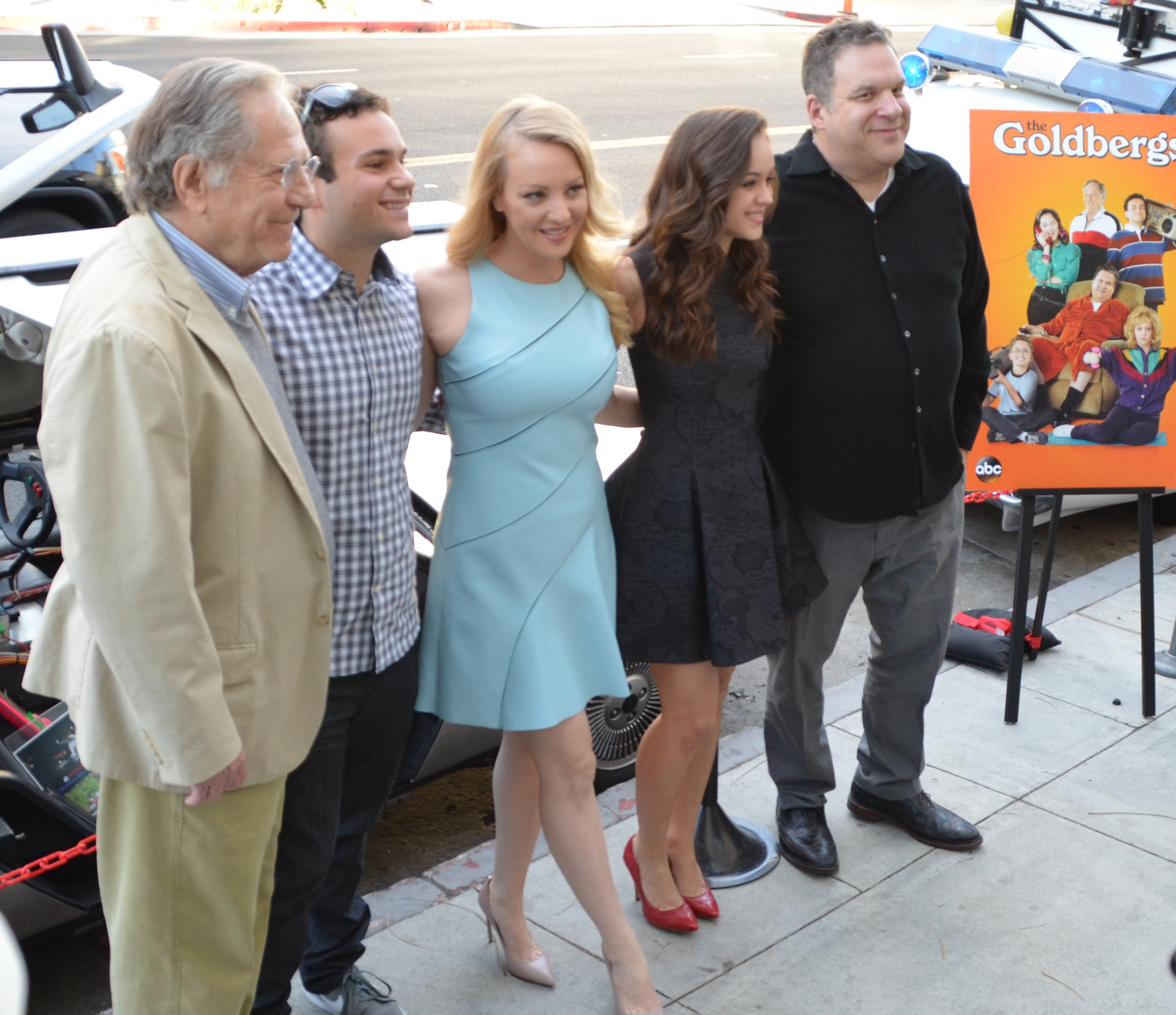
Segal (left) with The Goldbergs cast, 2014

Nevertheless, after this relatively dry period, Segal re-established himself as a successful character actor in the 1990s. Though he appeared in some less-acclaimed films, he also worked with directors such as Mark Rydell, Gus Van Sant, Barbra Streisand, David O. Russell, Randal Kleiser, and Ben Stiller, respectively, in well-received films such as For the Boys (1991), To Die For (1995), The Mirror Has Two Faces (1996), Flirting with Disaster (1996), It's My Party (1996), and The Cable Guy (1996). Additionally, he had guest appearances on various shows such as Murder She Wrote and The Larry Sanders Show and continued to appear in television films such as Seasons of the Heart (1994), Houdini (1998), and The Linda McCartney Story (2000). In 1999, he briefly performed in Yasmina Reza's Art on Broadway, and in 2001 he reprised his performance in the West End.

From 1997 to 2003, Segal had his most prominent role in years when he starred in the NBC workplace sitcom Just Shoot Me! as Jack Gallo, the successful yet often oblivious owner and publisher of a New York City fashion magazine. For this role, he was nominated for the Golden Globe Award for Best Actor – Television Series Musical or Comedy in 1999 and 2000 as well as a Satellite Award in 2002. The show, which also starred David Spade and Laura San Giacomo, among others, and which once aired between iconic sitcoms Friends and Seinfeld, lasted for seven seasons and 148 episodes.

After finishing his run on Just Shoot Me, Segal appeared in supporting roles in films such as Heights (2005) and 2012 (2009). He and Jill Clayburgh cameoed as Jake Gyllenhaal's parents in Love & Other Drugs (2010), reuniting the co-stars 46 years after they first worked together in The Terminal Man. Additionally, Segal worked more frequently as a voice actor, including a role in the English-language version of Studio Ghibli's The Tale of the Princess Kaguya (2013) and a comedic reprisal of his Who's Afraid of Virginia Woolf? role in a 2018 episode of The Simpsons. His most recent film performance was alongside Christopher Plummer in Elsa & Fred (2014). In other roles, Segal played talent manager Murray Berenson in three episodes of the television series Entourage (2009), guest starred in shows such as Boston Legal, Private Practice, and Pushing Daisies, appeared in comedic short videos such as Chutzpuh, This Is, and starred in the TV Land sitcom Retired at 35 (2011–2012), alongside his Bye Bye Braverman co-star Jessica Walter.

Segal had another success when he starred in the ABC sitcom The Goldbergs (2013–2021), playing Albert "Pops" Solomon, the eccentric but lovable grandfather of a semi-autobiographical family based on that of series creator Adam F. Goldberg. The long-running series entered its eighth season in 2021, and Segal was part of the regular cast up until his death in March of that year. Throughout the show, Segal had appeared in most, though not all, episodes and, as in some of his earlier roles, he played the banjo several times on-screen.

In 2017, Segal received a star on the Hollywood Walk of Fame in the category of Television.

Segal actively participated in a documentary about his life and career entitled Segal (2025), which was distributed posthumously through a wide digital release in 2026.

== Music performances and recordings ==
Segal was an accomplished banjo player. He released three albums and performed with the instrument in several of his acting roles and on late-night television. In addition to the banjo, he frequently played other small lute instruments such as the ukulele and dobro on TV and in his movies. Segal also sang, for example in Blume in Love.

In 1966, Segal released his debut LP, The Yama Yama Man. The title track is a ragtime version of the 1908 tune "The Yama Yama Man" with horns and banjos. Segal released the album at a time when he appeared regularly playing banjo on The Tonight Show Starring Johnny Carson. Segal also played banjo and sang with The Smothers Brothers when they performed Phil Ochs's "Draft Dodger Rag" on their CBS television show.

George Segal and the Imperial Jazzband released the album A Touch of Ragtime in 1974, with Segal on banjo. He made frequent television appearances with the "Beverly Hills Unlisted Jazz Band", whose members included actor Conrad Janis on trombone, and, in 1981, they performed live at Carnegie Hall.

== Personal life and death ==
Segal was married three times. He married film editor Marion Segal Freed in 1956, who would go on to work as an associate producer or editor on three of his films. They had two daughters and were together until their divorce in 1983. From 1983 until her death in 1996, he was married to Linda Rogoff, a one-time manager of The Pointer Sisters whom he met at Carnegie Hall when he played the banjo with his band the Beverly Hills Unlisted Jazz Band. He married his former George School boarding school classmate Sonia Schultz Greenbaum in 1998.

Later in his life, Segal lived part-time in Sonoma County when he was not filming The Goldbergs in Los Angeles.

Segal died of complications from bypass surgery in Santa Rosa, California, on March 23, 2021, at age 87.

== Filmography ==
=== Film ===
Year	Title	Role	Director	Notes
1961	The Young Doctors	Dr. Howard	Phil Karlson	
1962	The Longest Day	U.S. Army Ranger	Ken Annakin, Andrew Marton, & Bernhard Wicki	
1963	Act One	Lester Sweyd	Dore Schary	
1964	Invitation to a Gunfighter	Matt Weaver	Richard Wilson	
1964	The New Interns	Dr. Tony "Shiv" Parelli	John Rich	Golden Globe Award for Most Promising Newcomer – Male
1965	King Rat	Corporal King	Bryan Forbes	
1965	Ship of Fools	David Scott	Stanley Kramer	
1966	Lost Command	Lieutenant Mahidi	Mark Robson	
1966	Who's Afraid of Virginia Woolf?	Nick	Mike Nichols	Nominated — Academy Award for Best Supporting Actor; Nominated — Golden Globe Award for Best Supporting Actor – Motion Picture
1966	The Quiller Memorandum	Quiller	Michael Anderson	
1967	The St. Valentine's Day Massacre	Peter Gusenberg	Roger Corman	
1968	Bye Bye Braverman	Morroe Rieff	Sidney Lumet	
1968	No Way to Treat a Lady	Morris Brummel	Jack Smight	Nominated — BAFTA Award for Best Actor in a Supporting Role
1968	The Girl Who Couldn't Say No	Franco	Franco Brusati	
1969	The Bridge at Remagen	Lieutenant Phil Hartman	John Guillermin	
1969	The Southern Star	Dan Rockland	Sidney Hayers	
1970	Loving	Brooks Wilson	Irvin Kershner	
1970	Where's Poppa?	Gordon Hocheiser	Carl Reiner	
1970	The Owl and the Pussycat	Felix Sherman	Herbert Ross	
1971	Born to Win	J	Ivan Passer	
1972	The Hot Rock	Kelp	Peter Yates	
1973	Blume in Love	Stephen Blume	Paul Mazursky	
1973	A Touch of Class	Steve Blackburn	Melvin Frank	Golden Globe Award for Best Actor in a Motion Picture – Musical or Comedy; Kansas City Film Critics Circle Award for Best Actor
1974	The Terminal Man	Harry Benson	Mike Hodges	
1974	California Split	Bill Denny	Robert Altman	
1975	Russian Roulette	Corporal Timothy Shaver	Lou Lombardo	
1975	The Black Bird	Sam Spade Jr.	David Giler	Executive producer
1975	Nashville	Himself (cameo)	Robert Altman	Scene deleted
1976	The Duchess and the Dirtwater Fox	Charlie "Dirtwater Fox" Malloy	Melvin Frank	
1977	Fun with Dick and Jane	Dick Harper	Ted Kotcheff	
1977	Rollercoaster	Harry Calder	James Goldstone	
1978	Who Is Killing the Great Chefs of Europe?	Robby Ross	Ted Kotcheff	
1979	Lost and Found	Adam Watson	Melvin Frank	
1980	The Last Married Couple in America	Jeff Thompson	Gilbert Cates	
1981	Carbon Copy	Walter Whitney	Michael Schultz	
1982	Killing 'em Softly	Jimmy Skinner	Max Fischer	
1985	Stick	Barry Braun	Burt Reynolds	
1988	Run for Your Life	Alan Morani	Terence Young	
1989	Look Who's Talking	Albert	Amy Heckerling	
1989	All's Fair	Colonel	Rocky Lang	
1991	For the Boys	Art Silver	Mark Rydell	
1991	Time of Darkness	Grigory	Vladimir Alenikov	
1992	Me Myself & I	Buddy Arnett	Pablo Ferro	
1992	Un orso chiamato Arturo	Billy	Sergio Martino	
1993	Joshua Tree	Lieutenant Franklin L. Severence	Vic Armstrong	
1993	Look Who's Talking Now	Albert	Tom Ropelewski	Cameo
1994	Direct Hit	James Tronson	Joseph Merhi	Video
1995	To Die For	Conference Speaker	Gus Van Sant	Uncredited
1995	The Babysitter	Bill Holsten	Guy Ferland	Video
1995	The Feminine Touch	Senator "Beau" Ashton	Conrad Janis	Video
1995	Deep Down	Gil	John Travers	Video
1996	It's My Party	Paul Stark	Randal Kleiser	
1996	Flirting with Disaster	Ed Coplin	David O. Russell	
1996	The Cable Guy	Earl Kovacs	Ben Stiller	
1996	The Mirror Has Two Faces	Henry Fine	Barbra Streisand	
2005	Heights	Rabbi Mendel	Chris Terrio	
2005	Chutzpuh, This Is?	Dr. Dreck	Rick Kent	Short film
2005	Dinotopia: Quest for the Ruby Sunstone	Albagon	Davis Doi	Voice, direct-to-video
2007	Three Days to Vegas	Dominic Spinuzzi	Charlie Picerni	
2007	My Wife Is Retarded	Julie's father	Etan Cohen	Short film
2009	2012	Tony Delgatto	Roland Emmerich	
2009	Made for Each Other	Mr. Jacobs	Daryl Goldberg	
2010	Love & Other Drugs	Dr. James Randall	Edward Zwick	
2010	Ollie Klublershturf vs. the Nazis	Elliott Klublershturf	Skot Bright	Short film
2014	The Tale of the Princess Kaguya	Inbe no Akita	Isao Takahata	Voice
2014	Elsa & Fred	John	Michael Radford	

=== Stage ===
Year	Title	Role	Notes
1959	Leave it to Jane	Minor role	Off-Broadway
1961–1962	Gideon	Purah	Broadway
1963	Rattle of a Simple Man	Ricard	Broadway
1964	The Knack	Tolen	Off-Broadway
1985	Requiem for a Heavyweight	Maish Resnick	Broadway
1993	The Fourth Wall	Roger	Chicago
1998–1999	Art	Serge	Broadway
2001	Art	Serge	West End
2007	Heroes	Gustave	Los Angeles
2007	Prophesy and Honor	Colonel Sherman Moreland	Honolulu
2008	Secret Order	Saul Roth	Los Angeles

=== Television ===
Year	Title	Role	Notes
1960	The Play of the Week	(1) Don; (2) Innkeeper	(1) Season 1 Episode 13: "The Closing Door"; (2) Season 2 Episode 13: "Emmanuel"
1960–1962	Armstrong Circle Theatre	(1) First Lieutenant Paul Fallon	(1) Season 10 Episode 8: "Ghost Bomber: The Lady Be Good" (1960) (aired February 3); (2) Season 10 Episode 24: "Ghost Bomber" (1960) (aired September 28); (3) Season 13 Episode 3: "The Friendly Thieves" (1962) (aired October 24)
1962	The United States Steel Hour	Pete	Season 10 Episode 2: "The Inner Panic"
1963	Channing	Andre	Season 1 Episode 8: "A Patron Saint for the Cargo Cult"
1963	Naked City	Jerry Costell	Season 4 Episode 20: "Man Without a Skin"
1963	The Alfred Hitchcock Hour	Larry Duke	Season 2 Episode 2: "A Nice Touch"
1963–1964	The Doctors and the Nurses	(1) Dr. Novak; (2) Dr. Harry Warren	(1) Season 1 Episode 15: "Root of Violence" (1963); (2) Season 2 Episode 24: "Climb a Broken Ladder" (1964)
1964	Arrest and Trial	Jack Wisner	Season 1 Episode 28: "He Ran for His Life"
1965–1991	The Tonight Show Starring Johnny Carson	Himself	47 episodes
1966	Death of a Salesman	Biff Loman	Television film
1967	The Desperate Hours	Glenn Griffin	Television film
1968	Of Mice and Men	George	Television film
1973	The Lie	Andrew	Television film
1982	The Deadly Game	Howard Trapp	Television film Nominated — CableAce Award for Best Actor in a Theatrical or Non-Musical Program
1983	Trackdown: Finding the Goodbar Killer	John Grafton	Television film
1984	The Zany Adventures of Robin Hood	Robin Hood	Television film
1984	The Cold Room	Hugh Martin	Television film
1985	Not My Kid	Dr. Frank Bower	Television film
1986	Many Happy Returns	William "Bud" Robinson	Television film
1987	Take Five	Andy Kooper	Series regular; All 6 episodes
1988–1989	Murphy's Law	Daedalus Patrick Murphy	Series regular; 13 episodes
1989	The Endless Game	Mr. Miller	Miniseries; 2 episodes
1993	Murder, She Wrote	Dave Novaro	Season 10 Episode 9: "Murder at a Discount"
1993	Taking the Heat	Kepler	Television film
1993–1995	The Larry Sanders Show	Himself	(1) Season 2 Episode 14: "Performance Artist" (1993); (2) Season 4 Episode 16: "Eight" (1995)
1994	Seasons of the Heart	Ezra Goldstine	Television film
1994	Following Her Heart	Harry	Television film
1994	High Tide	Gordon	22 episodes
1994	Burke's Law	Ben Zima	Season 1 Episode 1: "Who Killed the Starlet?"
1994	Aaahh!!! Real Monsters	J.B.	Voice; Season 1 Episode 3: "Curse of the Krumm/Krumm Goes Hollywood"
1995	Picture Windows	Ted Varnas	Miniseries; Season 1 Episode 5: "Song of Songs"
1995–1997	The Naked Truth	Fred Wilde	(1) Season 1 Episode 9: "Girl Buys Soup While Woman Weds Ape!" (1995); (2) Season 2 Episode 4: "The Sister Show" (1997); (3) Season 2 Episode 11: "The Parents" (1997); (4) Season 2 Episode 12: "The Spa" (1997)
1996	The Making of a Hollywood Madam	Leo	Television film
1996	Adventures from the Book of Virtues	Eli	Voice; Season 1 Episode 4: "Compassion"
1996–1997	The Real Adventures of Jonny Quest	Dr. Benton C. Quest	Voice; 24 episodes
1997	Tracey Takes On...	Harry Rosenthal	(1) Season 2 Episode 3: "Mothers"; (2) Season 2 Episode 11: "Money"; (3) Season 2 Episode 12: "Race Relations"; (4) Season 2 Episode 13: "Supernatural"; (5) Season 2 Episode 14: "Politics"
1997	Caroline in the City	Bob Anderson	Season 2 Episode 19: "Caroline and the Buyer"
1997–2003	Just Shoot Me!	Jack Gallo	Series regular; 148 episodes Nominated — Golden Globe Award for Best Actor in a Television Series – Musical or Comedy (1998–1999); Nominated — Satellite Award for Best Actor in a Television Series – Musical or Comedy (2001)
1998	Houdini	Martin Beck	Television film
2000	The Linda McCartney Story	Lee Eastman	Television film
2001	The Zeta Project	Dr. Eli Selig	Voice; Season 1 Episode 13: "Absolute Zero"
2003	Law & Order: Special Victims Unit	Dr. Roger Tate	Season 5 Episode 8: "Abomination"
2003	The Electric Piper	Mayor Nick Dixon	Voice; Television film
2005	Fielder's Choice	JD	Television film
2007	Private Practice	Wendell Parker	Season 1 Episode 9: "In Which Dell Finds His Fight"
2007	The War at Home	Sid	Season 2 Episode 16: "No Weddings and a Funeral"
2007	Billy & Mandy's Big Boogey Adventure	Horror	Voice; Television film
2008	Boston Legal	Paul Cruickshank	Season 4 Episode 19: "The Gods Must Be Crazy"
2009	Pushing Daisies	Roy "Buster" Bustamante	Season 2 Episode 11: "Window Dressed to Kill"
2009	Entourage	Murray Berenson	(1) Season 6 Episode 5: "Fore"; (2) Season 6 Episode 6: "Murphy's Lie"; (3) Season 6 Episode 7: "No More Drama"
2010	Scooby-Doo! Mystery Incorporated	Peter Trickell	Voice; Season 1 Episode 4: "Revenge of the Man Crab"
2011–2012	Retired at 35	Alan Robbins	Series regular; 20 episodes
2012–2013	American Dad!	(1) Bernie; (2) Probate Lawyer	Voice; (1) Season 7 Episode 14: "Stan's Best Friend" (2012; (2) Season 8 Episode 11: "Max Jets" (2013)
2013–2021	The Goldbergs	Albert "Pops" Solomon	Series regular; 185 episodes (Note: Segal was credited as a series regular for every episode of the first eight seasons for a total of 185 episodes, though he appeared as an actor in 158. His final appearance was in the sixteenth episode of season eight, after which he continued to be credited through the season finale.)
2018	The Simpsons	Nick	Voice; Season 30 Episode 2: "Heartbreak Hotel"

== Discography ==
Year	Title	Notes
1967	The Yama Yama Man	LP
1970	The Owl and the Pussycat	LP; Dialogue excerpts from the film performed by Barbra Streisand and George Segal, accompanied by music by Blood, Sweat & Tears
1974	A Touch of Ragtime	LP; As George Segal and the Imperial Jazzband
1987	Basin Street	LP; Canadian Brass with George Segal

== Awards and nominations ==
Year	Award	Category	Work	Result	Ref.
1966	Academy Awards	Best Supporting Actor	Who's Afraid of Virginia Woolf?	Nominated	
1968	British Academy Film Awards	Best Actor in a Supporting Role	No Way to Treat a Lady	Nominated	
1983	CableAce Awards	Best Actor in a Theatrical or Non-Musical Program	The Deadly Game	Nominated	
1964	Golden Globe Awards	Most Promising Newcomer – Male	The New Interns	Won (Note: Tied with Harve Presnell and Chaim Topol.)	
1966	Golden Globe Awards	Best Supporting Actor – Motion Picture	Who's Afraid of Virginia Woolf?	Nominated	
1973	Golden Globe Awards	Best Actor in a Motion Picture – Musical or Comedy	A Touch of Class	Won	
1998	Golden Globe Awards	Best Actor in a Television Series – Musical or Comedy	Just Shoot Me!	Nominated	
1999	Golden Globe Awards	Best Actor in a Television Series – Musical or Comedy	Just Shoot Me!	Nominated	
1973	Kansas City Film Critics Circle Awards	Best Actor	A Touch of Class	Won	
1965	Laurel Awards	Top New Faces – Male		6th Place	
1967	Laurel Awards	Top Male Supporting Performance	Who's Afraid of Virginia Woolf?	Nominated	
2001	Satellite Awards	Best Actor in a Television Series – Musical or Comedy	Just Shoot Me!	Nominated	

=== Other honors ===
- 1989: A portrait of Segal by photographer Lewis Morley was acquired by the National Portrait Gallery, London.
- 2017: Star on the Hollywood Walk of Fame
