= Graduation Day (1981 film) =

1981 film by Herb Freed

- Theatrical release poster
- Directed by: Herb Freed
- Screenplay by: Anne Marisse; Herb Freed
- Story by: David Baughn
- Produced by: David Baughn; Herb Freed
- Starring: Christopher George; Patch Mackenzie; E. Danny Murphy; Michael Pataki; E. J. Peaker
- Cinematography: Daniel Yarussi
- Edited by: Martin Jay Sadoff
- Music by: Arthur Kempel
- Production company: IFI/Scope III
- Distributed by: IFI/Scope III
- Release date: May 1, 1981
- Running time: 96 minutes
- Country: United States
- Language: English
- Budget: $250,000
- Box office: $1.5 million–$23.9 million (Note: According to the contemporary financial film data website The Numbers, Graduation Day grossed $23.9 million worldwide. Other sources indicate a North American box office gross of $1,150,000, while in the book Blood Money: A History of the First Teen Slasher Film Cycle (2010), writer Richard Nowell indicates the film earned less than $1 million.)

Graduation Day is a 1981 American slasher film co-written, co-produced, and directed by Herb Freed, and starring Christopher George, Patch Mackenzie, Michael Pataki, and E. Danny Murphy in his film debut. The plot follows a high school track team who are stalked and murdered by a masked assailant days before their graduation. Linnea Quigley, Vanna White, and Karen Abbott appear in supporting performances.

Filmed in L.A., Graduation Day was released in the spring of 1981, grossing nearly $24 million on a budget of $250,000, far exceeding the genre's usual box office at the time. Though it received a largely negative reception, the film has since developed a cult following among genre fans.

The film features the L.A. new wave band Felony, who appear in the film, and whose music is used throughout.

== Plot ==
Laura Ramstead, a senior athlete at a small-town Southern California high school, collapses during a track meet, dying unexpectedly of a cardiac embolism.

Two months later, her elder sister Anne, a U.S.N. officer, arrives in town to participate in the high school graduation ceremony in which her sister will be honored. Anne blames Laura's coach, Coach Michaels, for pushing her too hard, which she believes contributed to Laura's death. As Anne passes through downtown, she witnesses Paula, one of Laura's teammates, jogging on the trails in the woods. Paula is subsequently stabbed to death by an unseen killer.

Anne attends a graduation rehearsal at the high school, where she is set to be a special guest. Afterward, she visits Laura's boyfriend, Kevin, and gives him one of Laura's medals as a memento. Meanwhile, Sally, a gymnast preparing for a photoshoot, is startled by her classmates, Doris and Joanna, in the locker room. Shaken, she is unable to perform her routine for the shoot. In the locker room, Sally is confronted by a person dressed in fencing attire who stabs her through the throat with a fencing sword.

The next day, Ralph, another track member, encounters Doris and Joanna on the trails in the woods. They jokingly take his football and throw it into the underbrush before leaving. While searching for the ball, Ralph is confronted by the killer, who throws the ball back to him with a metal spike attached, impaling and killing him. That night, a graduation dance takes place at the high school. Dolores, a flirtatious track team member, leaves the dance with her boyfriend, Tony. The two venture into the wooded trails to have sex. The two are met by the killer, who decapitates them both with a sword.

Principal Guglione fields phone calls from the worried parents of Paula, Sally, Tony, and Dolores, all of whom have gone missing. An inspector, Halliday, arrives to investigate. Meanwhile, alone on the track field, track member Pete runs to attempt a pole vault. However, the pads in the pole vault pit have been replaced by steel spikes, and he is killed upon impact. Halliday subsequently questions Coach Michaels about the youth's disappearances; Michaels, enraged, informs Halliday he has just been fired due to the negative publicity surrounding Laura's death.

Simultaneously, Doris and Joanne discover Sally's corpse stuffed in a locker in the locker room. Their screams alert Coach Michaels and Kevin, who stumble upon the scene. Kevin accuses Coach Michaels of being the killer, and a fight ensues. Anne and Halliday also arrive at the scene; Anne notices a photo of the track team inside the locker, with each member's face—except for Kevin's—crossed out. Coach Michaels flees to the wooded trails, with Kevin pursuing him, and Anne and Inspector Halliday trailing behind. Coach Michaels discovers Ralph's body before he is met by a knife-wielding Kevin, who reveals himself to be the killer—it is he who has been systematically dispatching the track team, to which he has affixed blame for Laura's death. A struggle ensues during which Coach Michaels gains control of the knife. Halliday, arriving at the scene, shoots Coach Michaels to death, assuming him to be the perpetrator.

A short time later, Anne visits Kevin's house. Upstairs, she discovers Laura's corpse in Kevin's bedroom, donning a graduation cap and gown. A crazed Kevin enters the room and attempts to kill Anne out of fear that she will "take Laura away" from him. During a struggle, Anne throws Kevin, along with Laura's corpse, through the window. She flees the house and ends up at the high school track field. Kevin pursues her, chasing her beneath the bleachers, where she finds Dolores's severed head and Pete's spike-riddled body in a storage shed. During their physical altercation, Anne manages to push Kevin onto Pete's spike-riddled body, killing him.

After giving her statement to the police, a traumatized Anne returns home that night and hallucinates an undead Kevin in her room, when in reality it is just her drunk stepfather, Ronald. The next morning, Anne impassively says goodbye and leaves the town in a taxi while the Graduation Day banner hangs over the main street.

== Cast ==
- Christopher George as Coach George Michaels, Laura's coach
- Patch Mackenzie as Anne Ramstead, Laura's older sister and a U.S. Navy officer
- E. Danny Murphy as Kevin Badger, Laura's boyfriend
- Michael Pataki as Mr. Guglione, the school principal
- E. J. Peaker as Blondie
- Linnea Quigley as Dolores
- Denise Cheshire as Sally Prescott
- Billy Hufsey as Tony Fisk
- Tom Hintnaus as Peter "Pete" McFarland
- Vanna White as Doris
- Karen Abbott as Joanne
- Linda Shayne as Paula Brentwood, one of Laura's teammates
- Richard Balin as Mr. Roberts
- Carmen Argenziano as Inspector Halliday
- Virgil Frye as Officer MacGregor
- Carl Rey as Ralph Johnson
- Erica Hope as Diana
- Beverly Dixon as Elaine Ramstead, Anne and Laura's mother
- Hal Bokar as Ronald Corliss, Elaine's husband and stepfather to Anne and Laura
- Ruth Ann Llorens as Laura Ramstead
- Grant Loud as singer
- Felony as Themselves

== Production ==
Pre-production commenced in 1980, where filming began on December 8 in L.A.. Principal photography lasted through Christmas over the course of four weeks.

== Music ==
The film features the L.A. new wave band Felony, who perform during the graduation dance sequence and whose music appears throughout the film.

== Release ==
The film premiered in L.A. on May 1, 1981, at the Hollywood Pacific Theatre. To promote the film's premiere, dozens of local teenagers were hired to stand outside the theater in graduation gowns with badges reading: "I survived Graduation Day."

=== Home media ===
The film was originally released on VHS by Columbia Pictures Home Entertainment in 1982, and again in 1983 by RCA/Columbia Pictures Home Video. Troma Entertainment released Graduation Day on DVD for the first time on October 1, 2002, which was later released on December 20, 2005, by Legacy Entertainment. Vinegar Syndrome released the film on DVD and Blu-ray in North America in September 2014, while 88 Films released it on Blu-ray in the UK on October 13.

== Reception ==
=== Box office ===
The film grossed $98,000 during its opening weekend in 16 theaters. It earned $512,884 between May 8–10 in 83 theaters, and $319,538 in 74 theaters during May 15–17. Its release was expanded to 15 additional US cities, running from May 22 to August 14.

Sources vary regarding the final box office returns for Graduation Day.

=== Critical response ===
Graduation Day received unfavorable responses from film critics. Writing for The Washington Post, Richard Harrington criticized the film as "badly acted" and "seemingly shot with varied-quality stock footage". Linda Gross of the Los Angeles Times referred to it as "an insinuating and lecherous movie with many hokey effects and poor-quality acting", while Variety similarly noted the film as "poor quality". The Fort Lauderdale News's Candice Russell summarized it as a "drippy, dippy horror film", noting: "Because Graduation Day doesn't deserve to be taken seriously, it's fun to laugh at its incongruities".

Jeremy Wheeler at AllMovie awarded the film 1/5 stars, writing that "Graduation Day needed more time in the school of horror before it could truly make the grade." On the internet review aggregator website Rotten Tomatoes, the film holds a 57% approval rating based on 7 reviews, with an average of 5.2/10. Many prominent critics in the U.S., especially on the East Coast and in large Midwestern cities, refused to review the film at all because they were disgusted by the wave of gory slasher films and had started boycotting new releases, in the hopes that this would hurt the slasher genre at the box office (for example, Gene Siskel and Roger Ebert did not discuss the film on their weekly TV show, nor did they write print reviews for it).

Heather Drain of DangerousMinds.net praised the film in a 2014 retrospective, writing: "Graduation Day may not be a perfect film, with the last 20 minutes dragging a wee bit, but between the editing, a great cast, especially Pataki, George and Patch Mackenzie as the strong but subtly sensitive Anne and a willingness to explore a darker universe where kids are never truly safe, killer or no killer, it is a surprising treat of a movie."

== See also ==
- List of films about the sport of athletics

== Sources ==
- Donahue, Suzanne Mary (1987). American Film Distribution: The Changing Marketplace. Ann Arbor, Michigan: UMI Research Press. ISBN 978-0-835-71776-2.
- Nowell, Richard (2010). Blood Money: A History of the First Teen Slasher Film Cycle. London, England: Bloomsbury. ISBN 978-1-441-12496-8.
- Rockoff, Adam (2002). Going to Pieces: The Rise and Fall of the Slasher Film. Jefferson, North Carolina: McFarland & Company. ISBN 978-0-786-41227-3.
