= Cedar Hill (Central Park) =

Slope in Manhattan, New York

Coordinates: 40°46′40″N 73°58′0″W

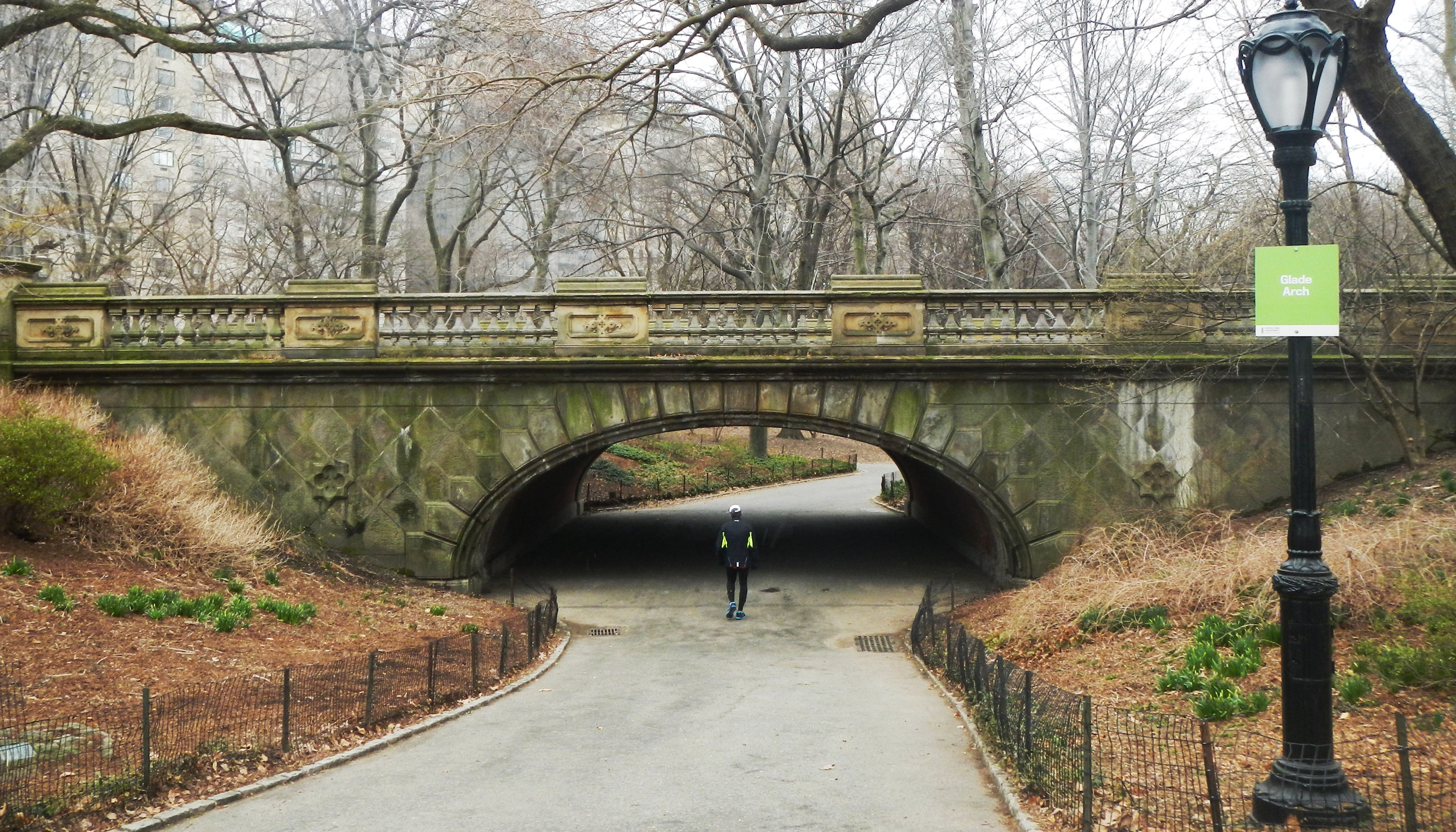
Glade Arch

Notable buildings and structures of Central Park. Click on the map and then on the points for details.
'"`UNIQ--templatestyles-00000004-QINU`"''"`UNIQ--templatestyles-00000005-QINU`"'

Cedar Hill is an east-facing slope in Central Park, Manhattan, New York City. The hill is home to many red cedars that form a line of clumps on its crest. Low outcroppings of rock in the mowed turf were grooved and scarred by the last glacial period.

== History ==
The hill is used for reading and sunbathing, as well as sledding in winter, and is a preferred area for dog owners. The south slope is called by joggers "Cat Hill" for its statue, 'Still Hunt', of a large stalking cat. Eddie Coyle, a sportswriter for the New York Daily News, in his weekly running columns in the late 1970s, often called it "cat" Hill and the name became popular.

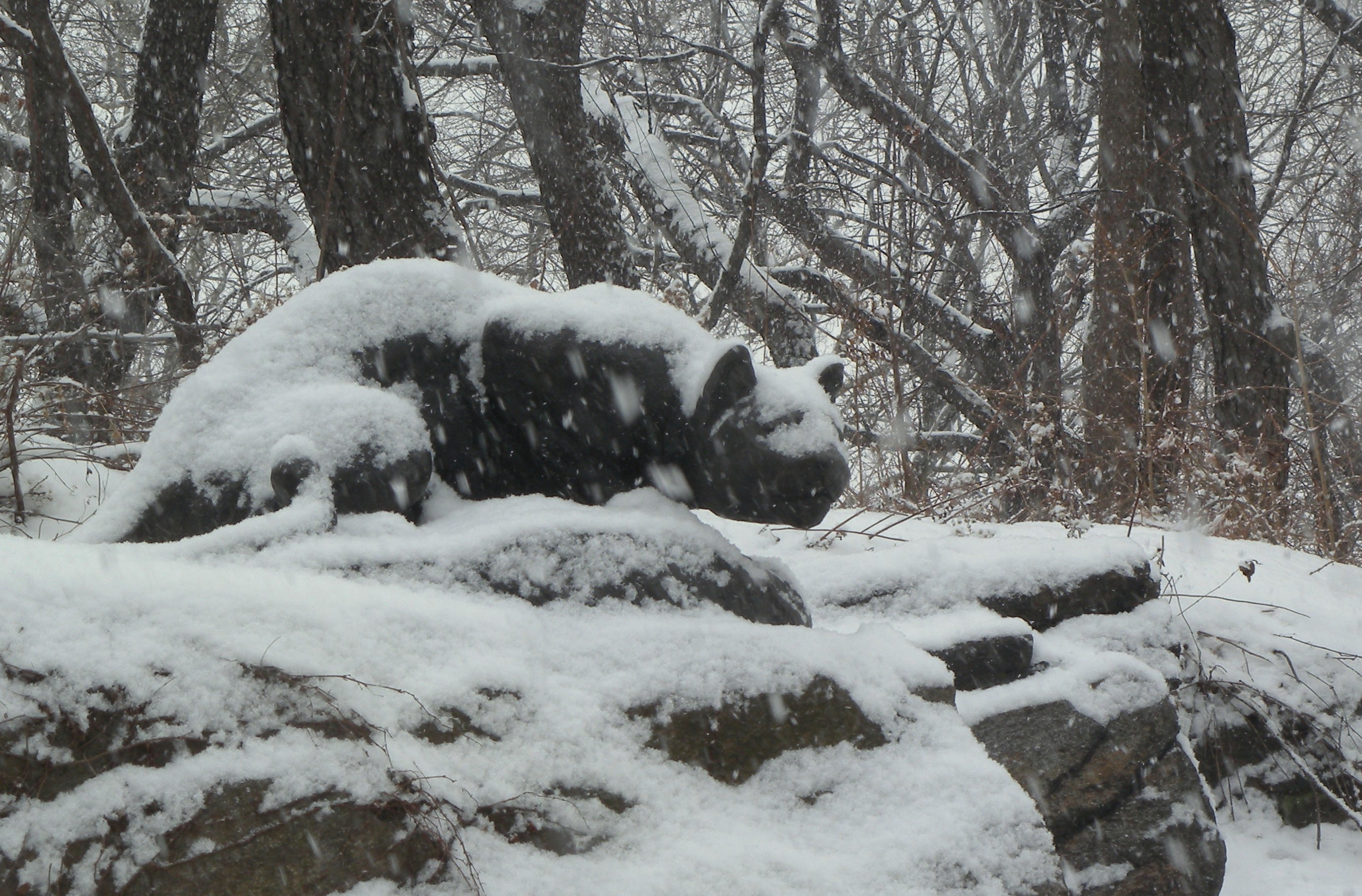
'Still Hunt' on Cat Hill

The frontage of Fifth Avenue apartment houses provides a backdrop to the east. At its southern perimeter stands the Glade Arch designed by Calvert Vaux, which originally provided carriage traffic with a conduit to Fifth Avenue. Hidden deep beneath the north end of Cedar Hill runs New York City Water Tunnel No. 3 with its valve chamber, completed in 1993, due to carry some of the city's drinking water in 2020.

The slope has been featured prominently in a number of films such as The Owl and the Pussycat (1970) and Enchanted (2007).
