= P.K. and the Kid =

- Directed by: Lou Lombardo
- Written by: Neal Barbera
- Produced by: Joe Roth
- Starring: Paul Le Mat; Molly Ringwald; Alex Rocco; Charles Hallahan; Fionnula Flanagan
- Cinematography: Edmond L. Koons
- Edited by: Tony Lombardo
- Music by: James Horner
- Production company: Sunn Classic Pictures
- Distributed by: Castle Hill Productions
- Release date: January 1987
- Running time: 89 minutes
- Country: United States
- Language: English

P.K. and the Kid (also known as Petaluma Pride) is a 1987 American drama film directed by Lou Lombardo and starring Paul Le Mat, Molly Ringwald, Alex Rocco, Charles Hallahan and Fionnula Flanagan. Filmed in 1983 but shelved for four years, it was eventually released in 1987.

== Plot ==
P.K. runs away from home because her step-father keeps on harassing her sexually and her mother is ignoring the problem. She hides in the loading space of Kid Kane's pickup, who's on the way to the world championships in arm-pressing. When he discovers her, he wants to send her home at first, but after he knows the story he takes her with him - and gets himself into big trouble: her step-father is behind them, furiously trying to kidnap her and take revenge for the stress he got from her mother.

== Cast ==
- Paul Le Mat as Kid Kane
- Molly Ringwald as P.K.
- Alex Rocco as Les
- Charles Hallahan as Bazooka
- John DiSanti as Benny
- Fionnula Flanagan as Flo
- Bert Remsen as Al
- Leigh Hamilton as Louise
- John Madden as himself
- John Matuszak as himself
- Esther Rolle as Mim
- Charlene as Dolly
- Robert Wentz as Billy
- George Fisher as Scratch
- Gene LeBell as Big Mac
- Mike Adams as Ernie

== Production ==
Parts of the film were shot in Utah as well as Glenwood Springs, Colorado, Monterey, Petaluma, and San Francisco, California.
