= Michael Adams (stunt performer) =

American stuntman

- Born: March 22, 1950; United States
- Died: April 18, 2010 (aged 60); Santa Clarita, California, U.S.
- Occupations: Actor, stunt performer, stunt coordinator
- Years active: 1976–2009

Michael Adams (March 22, 1950 – April 18, 2010) was an American actor, stunt performer and stunt coordinator.

== Filmography ==
Year	Title	Role	Notes
1981	The Legend of the Lone Ranger	Ranger Palmer	
1982	Norman Loves Rose	Rich Gentleman	
1983	WarGames	Travis	
1984	Rhinestone	Bouncer #1	
1985	Mask	Biker #2	
1985	Pale Rider	Horseman #1	
1985	Commando	Private Harris	
1986	Raw Deal	Patrovita's Bodyguard	
1987	P.K. and the Kid	Ernie	
1988	Red Heat	Railroad Engineer	
1988	Split Decisions	Sparring Partner #3	
1989	Blind Fury	Ski Lodge Killer #4	
1990	Bloodmoon	Mr. Owens	
1993	Geronimo: An American Legend	Schoonover Gang #3	
1994	Redheads	Police Officer	
1996	Fox Hunt	Goon #1	(final film role)
