= Bill Manhoff =

American screenwriter, producer and playwright

- Born: Wilton David Manhoff; June 25, 1919; Newark, New Jersey, U.S.
- Died: June 19, 1974 (aged 55); Los Angeles, California, U.S.
- Occupations: TV and film screenwriter, playwright
- Years active: 1955–1974

Wilton "Bill" Manhoff (June 25, 1919 – June 19, 1974) was an American screenwriter, producer and playwright. His television series script writing credits included Sanford and Son, The Partridge Family, All in the Family, Room 222, The Odd Couple, Petticoat Junction, Leave It to Beaver, The Jane Wyman Show and The Real McCoys. He also wrote the script for the 1964 Broadway play The Owl and the Pussycat, which Buck Henry used as inspiration for the screenplay for the 1970 film adaptation. Manhoff died at age 54 in Los Angeles, California.
