= Lou Lombardo (filmmaker) =

American filmmaker (1932–2002)

- Born: Louis Joseph Lombardo; February 15, 1932; Missouri, U.S.
- Died: May 8, 2002 (aged 70); Woodland Hills, California, U.S.
- Occupation: filmmaker

Lou Lombardo (February 15, 1932 – May 8, 2002) was an American filmmaker whose editing of the 1969 film The Wild Bunch has been called "seminal". In all, Lombardo is credited on more than twenty-five feature films. Noted mainly for his work as a film and television editor, he also worked as a cameraman, director, and producer. In his obituary, Stephen Prince wrote, "Lou Lombardo's seminal contribution to the history of editing is his work on The Wild Bunch (1969), directed by Sam Peckinpah. The complex montages of violence that Lombardo created for that film influenced generations of filmmakers and established the modern cinematic textbook for editing violent gun battles." Several critics have remarked on the "strange, elastic quality" of time in the film, and have discerned the film's influence in the work of directors John Woo, Quentin Tarantino, Kathryn Bigelow, and the Wachowskis, among others. While Lombardo's collaboration with Peckinpah lasted just a few years, his career was intertwined with that of director Robert Altman for more than thirty years. Lombardo edited Altman's 1971 film McCabe & Mrs. Miller (1971), which had "a radical approach to the use of dialogue and indeed other sound, both in and beyond the frame." Towards the end of his career Lombardo edited Moonstruck (1987) and two other films directed by Norman Jewison. While his editing is now considered "revolutionary" and "brilliant", Lombardo was never nominated for editing awards during his career.

== Early career ==
Lombardo's career began in Kansas City, where he was Robert Altman's cameraman working on training films and "industrials" for the Calvin Company. Altman ultimately became a prominent feature film director. Lombardo and Altman both relocated to Los Angeles in 1956, where Lombardo was employed as a cameraman by Republic Pictures. Lombardo's goal had been to become a director, and he decided that film editing was a more promising path. Lombardo became an apprentice editor at Revue Studios, at about half the salary he'd received as an assistant cameraman. As was common at that time for studio editors, an editing apprenticeship lasted eight years, during which Lombardo's work was uncredited. At the end of this apprenticeship, Robert Altman used Lombardo to edit a pilot program for television. This led to Lombardo's becoming an editor for the television program Felony Squad, which ran from 1966–1970.

== The Wild Bunch and the Peckinpah collaboration ==
The first feature film that Lombardo edited was The Wild Bunch (1969), which was directed by Sam Peckinpah. It is a Western noted for its violence, which was unusual in its time, and for its innovative and effective storytelling, camerawork, and editing. The film has proven to be profoundly influential long after its 1969 release, and was an inductee of the 1999 National Film Registry list. In 1995 Peter Stack wrote, "It's astonishing how harrowing The Wild Bunch is, more than 25 years after it blasted its way onto the big screen to become maybe the best shoot-'em-up ever made, the one that turned meanness into a haunting pictorial poetry and summed up the corruption of guilt, old age and death in the American fantasy of the Old West." Stephen Prince wrote in 1999 that, "The Wild Bunch is an epic work, and it has had an epic impact on American cinema" and noted Martin Scorsese's description of the film as "savage poetry". Paul Seydor has described the film as "one of the great masterpieces of world cinema", and then further notes that "Any discussion of The Wild Bunch implicitly acknowledges the editing by Lou Lombardo and Robert Wolfe, so integral is it to the style, meaning, and effect of the film. Still, one should at least observe that the art and craft of film editing know no higher peaks than The Wild Bunch, and very, very few that are anywhere near its summit."

=== Connection to The Felony Squad ===
Lombardo became acquainted with Peckinpah when he moonlighted as a cameraman when Peckinpah was directing the television movie Noon Wine (1966). Ultimately this connection led to Lombardo's joining Peckinpah to make The Wild Bunch; Peckinpah was particularly interested in the editing techniques that Lombardo had devised while editing Felony Squad. Lombardo described the crucial scene from the television show in a later interview with Vincent LoBrutto, "Joe Don Baker came out and was being shot by all these police. I printed every frame three times and created slow motion. I intercut him being shot, falling, this guy shooting, that guy running, Baker falling. Sam and Phil Feldman, the producer, saw it and said, 'You've got the job – and, as a matter of fact, we'll use that kind of thing.'" The episode of Felony Squad was "My Mommy Got Lost." At that time, slow motion cameras were not commonly used for television work. Lombardo used the laborious trick of stretching time by repeating the individual frames of film two or three times, which required that there be a film splice at every frame. There are typically 24 frames of film exposed each second by standard motion picture cameras, so after tripling Lombardo had 72 frames per second. Intercutting involves the splicing of sections of film from different cameras, or from different "takes" of the same scene.

=== Montage in The Wild Bunch ===
The Wild Bunch is bookended by two gun battles, one near the beginning of the film and one near its end. The gun battles are virtuosic demonstrations of the possibilities of film storytelling. Lombardo worked with Peckinpah both to design the camerawork for The Wild Bunch and to edit the film. As many as six cameras were filming simultaneously from different locations; the cameras were operating at various film rates from 24 to 120 frames per second. He and Peckinpah then edited the massive length of film footage for six months in Mexico, where the film had been shot. In his 2011 assessment, Daniel Eagan wrote, "The Wild Bunch had 3,642 edits, more than five times the Hollywood average for a feature. ... Montage this dense hadn't been attempted since Sergei Eisenstein back in the 1920s." Stephen Prince writes, "The editing is audacious and visionary, as the montages bend space and elongate time in a manner whose scope and ferocity was unprecedented in American cinema." In his biography of Peckinpah, Daniel Weddle wrote of the effect: "the action would constantly be shifting from slow to fast to slower still to fast again, giving time within the sequences a strange elastic quality". Gabrielle Murray summarized how The Wild Bunch affected filmmaking: "Peckinpah, with the help of the brilliant editor Louis Lombardo and cinematographer Lucien Ballard, developed a stylistic approach that through the use of slow-motion, multi-camera filming and montage editing, seemed to make the violence more intense and visceral."

=== Origins and legacy ===
The immediate inspiration for the gunbattle montage in The Wild Bunch was likely the 1967 film, Bonnie and Clyde, which Peckinpah apparently screened a few days before filming began. Bonnie and Clyde, which was directed by Arthur Penn and edited by Dede Allen, has a famed scene at its ending showing the killings of Bonnie and Clyde by state police. The scene mixes slow and accelerated motion and several cameras, which were aspects of The Wild Bunch. Still earlier these techniques had been employed in Akira Kurosawa's films, and in particular in Seven Samurai (1954). Kurosawa generally both directed and edited his films. Stephen Prince has written, "The kinetic attributes of Kurosawa's style, then, entered deeply into international cinema. In terms of the representation of violence, they influenced Arthur Penn and Sam Peckinpah and, from there, Hong Kong director John Woo, as well as virtually everybody since. Every filmmaker who uses slow motion, montage, and multiple cameras to stylize violence in the ways that Kurosawa had demonstrated in Seven Samurai owes him a great debt." But Tony Williams notes that The Wild Bunch "extended those influences in more creative and dynamic ways", and Michael Sragow argued that "Peckinpah did it right in The Wild Bunch. He produced an American movie that equals or surpasses the best of Kurosawa. Scorsese tries to match it in Gangs of New York – and doesn't come close. The Wild Bunch is the Götterdämmerung of Westerns." Seven Samurai, Bonnie and Clyde, and The Wild Bunch were all in the listing of the best edited films of all time compiled in 2012 by the Motion Picture Editors Guild.

Many critics have noted the influence of the editing of the setpiece gunbattles in The Wild Bunch on later films. Paul Monaco has written, "Lombardo pushed the revolution in Hollywood editing further than anyone else, and The Wild Bunch was established at the end of the 1960s as the epitome for fast-paced editing in a narrative film." David A. Cook included an extended list of the film's influences in a 1999 essay. In an interview, the director John Woo, who is widely celebrated for his martial arts films, explicitly acknowledged its influence. Director Quentin Tarantino is often included. Eric Snider writes, "We noted in our discussion of The Good, the Bad and the Ugly that it was a huge influence on Quentin Tarantino. The Wild Bunch must sit next to it on Tarantino’s shelf. He and numerous other directors – John Woo, Martin Scorsese, Francis Ford Coppola – have emulated Peckinpah’s slow-motion violence and realistic bloodletting. Much of what happens in The Wild Bunch seems cliche now, so frequently has it been copied and repeated." Director Kathryn Bigelow has written of The Wild Bunch that it seemed "almost gestalt editing ... because it imploded standard theories ... and was radical and tremendously vibrant." For The Matrix (1999, directed by The Wachowskis and edited by Zach Staenberg), Edgar-Hunt and his co-authors write that the "eye-catching violence upgrades the 'bullet ballets' of director Sam Peckinpah and the martial arts movies of Bruce Lee." John Goodman wrote in 2011, "Peckinpah’s combination of different film speeds and his offbeat, elliptical editing style were a revelation. John Woo, and also Takeshi Kitano and Wong Kar-Wai, have referenced Peckinpah’s innovations, but the original still packs the greatest punch for me." Ken Dancyger notes the influence on Crouching Tiger, Hidden Dragon (2000, directed by Ang Lee and edited by Tim Squyres).

=== The Ballad of Cable Hogue ===
Lombardo edited Peckinpah's next film, The Ballad of Cable Hogue (1970). The film itself has not had an impact comparable to that of The Wild Bunch; Prince writes that in this film Lombardo and Peckinpah "experimented less successfully with edits combining normal speed and accelerated action." The Ballad of Cable Hogue was their last collaboration; Peckinpah approached Lombardo about editing Straw Dogs, but Lombardo had already contracted to edit McCabe & Mrs. Miller with Robert Altman.

== Five films with Robert Altman ==
Lombardo had worked as a cameraman with director Robert Altman in Kansas City, and the two men both moved to Hollywood in 1956. In the 1970s, Lombardo edited five films directed by Altman, commencing with Brewster McCloud (1970) and concluding with California Split (1974) just four years later.

Of the five films with Altman, the most influential is likely McCabe & Mrs. Miller (1971). The film was selected for the US National Film Registry in 2010. The film has been called an "anti-Western"; McCabe establishes a successful brothel in a mining town, with the essential assistance of its madam, Mrs. Miller. In 1999, Roger Ebert wrote, "Robert Altman has made a dozen films that can be called great in one way or another, but one of them is perfect, and that one is McCabe & Mrs. Miller (1971)." Walter Chaw has written, "The father of contemplative American classics like Jim Jarmusch's Dead Man and Andrew Dominik's The Assassination of Jesse James by the Coward Robert Ford, McCabe & Mrs. Miller, like The Wild Bunch, packs every bit the wallop of relevance and currency that it did over three decades ago. No hint of hyperbole, they are two of the best films ever made."

As he had done for Peckinpah on The Wild Bunch, Lombardo acted as a second unit director for additional film footage. Altman and Lombardo spent nine months editing the film in North Vancouver, close to the location of the filming itself. The editing of the film has apparently never been singled out for critical attention, with the exception of the innovative style of sound editing. In his textbook on film production, Bruce Mamer uses the film to exemplify the blending of dialogue from many speakers, "Robert Altman was famous for using this style of layered dialogue cutting. The frontier barroom scene that opens his McCabe & Mrs. Miller (Louis Lombardo, editor) has snippets of conversations underlying the foreground action." Roger Crittenden wrote, "the questions Altman asked about the function of sound encouraged a radical approach to the use of dialogue and indeed other sound, both in and beyond the frame. Lou Lombardo must have played a major part in making the ideas work." Stephen Prince chose a related theme in summarizing Lombardo's collaboration with Altman: "Though his work for Altman was less trendsetting than that for Peckinpah, the partnership with Altman lasted much longer, and Lombardo found the perfect visual rhythms for Altman's wandering and diffuse audio style."

After California Split (1974), Altman wanted Lombardo to edit his next film Nashville (1975). Lombardo declined because he had turned to directing and producing. Altman chose Sidney Levin to edit, who was then succeeded by Lombardo's assistant editor on several films, Dennis M. Hill. In 1977, Lombardo edited The Late Show, which was produced by Altman but directed by Robert Benton. The Late Show is a film noir detective story; Pauline Kael wrote at the time, "The Late Show never lets up; the editing is by Lou Lombardo (who has often worked with Robert Altman) and Peter Appleton, and I can't think of a thriller from the forties that is as tight as this, or has such sustained tension."

Lombardo's final project with Altman was the film O.C. and Stiggs, which was produced around 1984 and released in 1987. Lombardo left the film before post-production was completed; he is uncredited on the film.

== Producing and directing ==
From 1975–1985 Lombardo worked as a producer and director as well as an editor. Lombardo's debut as a director was Russian Roulette (1975). The film is an espionage thriller that starred George Segal. A review in New York Magazine was unfavorable; "Lou Lombardo directs uninspiredly from a far from inspiring script co-authored by Tom Ardies, the original author of the novel." The film was released for home video in 1986, and has recently been reviewed more favorably.

Lombardo both produced and edited The Black Bird (1975), which was a humorous sequel to the film noir classic The Maltese Falcon; the film also starred George Segal, and was poorly reviewed upon its release.

Lombardo co-produced Cheech & Chong's first film, Up in Smoke (1978), which is now known as the "classic stoner comedy". The film enjoyed great box office success. Lombardo is also credited as the supervising editor on the film.

About 1981 Lombardo directed P. K. and the Kid, which starred a very young Molly Ringwald. The film was not released until early 1987, when Ringwald had become well-known; it nonetheless attracted little attention.

== Return to editing and the Norman Jewison collaboration ==
In 1986 Lombardo returned to editing with the fairly inconsequential Stewardess School. The film was produced by Phil Feldman, who had produced The Wild Bunch about 15 years earlier. Lombardo's next film was Moonstruck (1987), which was being directed and produced by Norman Jewison. Moonstruck was extremely successful at the box office, garnered three Academy Awards and three additional nominations, and has been well-regarded by many critics. Stephen Prince has written, "Another brilliant editor of late-sixties American cinema, Lou Lombardo (who edited The Wild Bunch (1969) to seminal effect) worked sporadically in the eighties and mainly on low-key films (Moonstruck, In Country (1989)) where his editing choices showed the intelligence and subtlety that rarely wins Oscars. The wonderful comic effectiveness and timing of Moonstruck, for example, depends as much on Lombardo's editing as on John Patrick Shanley's script or the performances by Cher, Nicolas Cage, and the rest of the cast." Lombardo next edited The January Man (1989), which was also produced by Jewison but directed by Pat O'Connor. Lombardo worked on five more films through 1991, of which the very popular comedy Uncle Buck (1989, written and directed by John Hughes) is likely the best known. The final film edited by Lombardo was still another of Jewison's productions, Other People's Money (1991).

== Final cuts ==
Lombardo and his wife, Lynn, had two daughters and a son, Tony Lombardo, who also became a film editor. In addition to his son, Lombardo mentored Dennis M. Hill and Paul Rubell in the early stages of their careers. Lombardo was interviewed about his career by Vincent LoBrutto in 1991. In that same year, he suffered a stroke that left him comatose until his death in 2002.

Lombardo had been selected as a member of the American Cinema Editors.

== Filmography ==
This filmography is based on the Internet Movie Database. Lombardo's credits are listed in the first parentheses. The director and release year are indicated in the second.

- (editor) The Name of the Game Is Kill! (Hellström-1968)
- (editor) The Wild Bunch (Peckinpah-1969)
- (editor) The Ballad of Cable Hogue (Peckinpah-1970)
- (editor) Brewster McCloud (Altman-1970)
- (supervising editor) Red Sun (Young-1971)
- (editor) McCabe & Mrs. Miller (Altman-1971)
- (editor) The Long Goodbye (Altman-1973)
- (editor) Ace Eli and Rodger of the Skies (Erman-1973)
- (editor) Thieves Like Us (Altman-1974)
- (editor) California Split (Altman-1974)
- (director) Russian Roulette (Lombardo-1975)
- (producer and editor) The Black Bird (Giler-1975)
- (editor) The Late Show (Benton-1977)
- (producer and supervising editor) Up in Smoke (Adler-1978)
- (supervising editor) The Changeling (Medak-1980)
- (executive producer) Ladies and Gentlemen, The Fabulous Stains (Adler-1982)
- (director) P.K. and the Kid (Lombardo-1985) (finished in 1982, shelved; released in 1987 because of Ringwald's success.)
- (supervising editor) Just One of the Guys (Gottlieb-1985)
- (editor) Stewardess School (Blancato-1986)
- (editor) Moonstruck (Jewison-1987)
- (editor) The January Man (O'Connor-1989)
- (editor) Uncle Buck (Hughes-1989)
- (editor) In Country (Jewison-1989)
- (supervising editor) Defenseless (Campbell-1991)
- (editor) Fires Within (Armstrong-1991)
- (editor) Other People's Money (Jewison-1991)
