= Beyond Evil =

- Theatrical poster
- Directed by: Herb Freed
- Written by: David Baughn; Herb Freed; Paul Ross
- Produced by: Rooven Akiba; David Baughn; Herb Freed; Jules Winter
- Starring: John Saxon; Lynda Day George; Michael Dante; Janice Lynde; David Opatoshu
- Cinematography: Ken Plotin
- Edited by: Rick Westover
- Music by: Pino Donaggio
- Production company: Entertainment Venture International
- Distributed by: IFI/Scope III
- Release date: May 9, 1980
- Running time: 94 minutes
- Language: English
- Box office: >$251,461

Beyond Evil is a 1980 American supernatural horror film directed by Herb Freed and starring John Saxon and Lynda Day George. Its plot follows an architect who suspects his wife is possessed by a former resident of the historic colonial mansion they have just moved into.

== Plot ==
Architect Larry Andrews and his new wife Barbara travel to a small island off the coast of the Philippines, where they are due to move into a condominium. Barbara is perturbed when Larry's business associate, Del, notifies them the residence is not ready yet, and pays for them to stay in a hotel, and tells Larry she feels Del exploits him. At dinner, Del subsequently reveals to the couple that there was no condominium to begin with, and that he instead arranged for them to live in a large, historic colonial mansion named Casa Fortuna. Del soon explains that the home is supposedly haunted by Alma Martín, the first lady of the home; she and her husband, Esteban, killed each other in the home according to local legend. Prior to their respective murders of one another, Alma became heavily involved in the occult.

Barbara begins being awoken by chanting and is troubled by visions of a woman she comes to find is Alma. On one occasion, she uncontrollably stabs herself in the hand, but claims to Larry it was accidental. Barbara is hospitalized and Dr. Albanos, a physician, runs tests on her. Meanwhile, Larry meets their neighbors, Leia Solomon, and her father, Dr. Solomon, a healer. Leia later confronts Larry and says she and her father can sense that Barbara is in danger, and urge him to have her healed. Larry becomes suspicious when the records of the tests Dr. Albanos completed on Barbara disappear. Dr. Solomon subsequently tells Larry that Alma is vying for Barbara's body, and that Barbara is in danger of spirit possession.

Larry proposes the two move, but Barbara resists. The next day, a construction accident at Larry's project seriously injures one of the foremen. Del later stops at the house and attempts to initiate sex with Barbara. She agrees, and leads him upstairs, where she pushes him from a balcony to his death. Larry later finds Barbara staring blankly into the fireplace, and she loses consciousness when he approaches her. Larry consults Dr. Solomon after he notices a strange skin anomaly on Barbara's finger, and Dr. Solomon insists Alma's spirit is attempting infect her. Leia tries to cleanse the house while Larry and Barbara are away, but is confronted by Alma's spirit, which electrocutes her to death before turning her to dust.

Larry brings Barbara to Dr. Solomon to examine her finger, which has continued to swell and has turned a deep red. Barbara is appalled when she enters and finds Dr. Solomon healing a gaping wound in a woman's stomach, and she storms out. The following day, Del's body is found by a villager lying on the hillside near the house. Larry consults Dr. Solomon to save Barbara at all costs. They attempt to stage an exorcism, but Barbara, infected by Alma's spirit, evades them. Alma materializes, threatening to fully take over Barbara as a host. When Dr. Solomon separates her spirit from Barbara's body, she attacks Larry, but rapidly begins to deteriorate, unable to use Barbara's life force. Now with Alma defeated, Larry and Barbara leave the mansion permanently.

== Cast ==
- John Saxon as Larry Andrews
- Lynda Day George as Barbara Andrews
- Michael Dante as Del Giorgio
- Mario Milano as Dr. Albanos
- Janice Lynde as Alma Martín
- Zitto Kazann as Esteban Martín
- Anne Marisse as Leia Solomon
- David Opatoshu as Dr. Solomon
- Verkina Flower as Girl Patient

== Production ==
Principal photography began around August 27, 1979, in the Philippines. The scenes that took place in the hotel restaurant were filmed at the Seven Seas Restaurant in Los Angeles, California.

== Release ==
Upon its release in California, the film grossed a total of $251,461 over three days, screening at 56 theaters.

=== Home media ===
The film was distributed on DVD by Troma Entertainment. On September 24, 2019, the film was released on DVD and Blu-ray by Vinegar Syndrome.
