= Carbon Copy (film) =

1981 film by Michael Schultz

- Theatrical release poster
- Directed by: Michael Schultz
- Written by: Stanley Shapiro
- Produced by: Carter DeHaven; Stanley Shapiro
- Starring: George Segal; Susan Saint James; Jack Warden; Dick Martin; Denzel Washington; Paul Winfield
- Cinematography: Fred J. Koenekamp
- Edited by: Marion Segal
- Music by: Bill Conti
- Production companies: Hemdale Film Corporation; RKO Pictures; First City
- Distributed by: AVCO Embassy Pictures (United States); Hemdale Film Distributors (United Kingdom)
- Release date: September 25, 1981
- Running time: 92 minutes
- Countries: United Kingdom; United States
- Language: English
- Budget: $6 million
- Box office: $9 million or $3.5 million

Carbon Copy is a 1981 comedy-drama film directed by Michael Schultz, produced by RKO Pictures and Hemdale Film Corporation, and released by Avco Embassy Pictures. The film stars George Segal, Susan Saint James, Jack Warden and Denzel Washington in his film acting debut. It was the first feature film produced by RKO after a break of many years.

It is an adaptation of Stanley Shapiro's 1970 play The Engagement Baby, which starred Barry Nelson and Clifton Davis and closed on Broadway after just four performances.

== Plot ==
Roger Porter, a 17-year-old African-American boy, is the long-lost son of Walter Whitney, a businessman living in the exclusive, predominantly white community of San Marino, California.

Walter, who is secretly Jewish, lives a frustrating life in his gated community—as he has to beg his wife Vivian for intercourse and put up with his obnoxious, disrespectful step-daughter Mary Ann's antics. Roger turns up at Walter's office, revealing that he is the result of Walter's long-ago relationship with a Black woman—Lorraine Porter—who is now dead. The only person who knew about Roger's mother was Walter's anti-Semitic, racist father-in-law and boss Nelson Longhurst—who had made Walter change his surname from Wiesenthal—and who, upon discovering Walter and Lorraine's engagement, had threatened to fire Walter if he continued the relationship. Walter, unaware of Roger, had written Lorraine a letter seeking to put their relationship on hold; she never answered, but Roger received the letter from his Aunt Clara upon his mother’s death.

Although dismayed and resentful of Roger's presence, Walter tries to make it up to Roger, telling Vivian that he wants to have Roger live with them for the summer as a foster son. She accepts but regrets the decision after she finds out about Roger's real relationship with Walter. She kicks Walter out, and Nelson fires him after Walter refuses to disown Roger. His lawyer and erstwhile best friend says that he will be representing Vivian in the divorce but gives him a referral to another lawyer, Bob Garvey, who is African-American. Garvey tells him that all his money is in only Vivian's and Mary Ann's names, so all he has left is the money in his wallet—$68. Walter checks into a sleazy motel with Roger and is unable to get a corporate job or a loan because Nelson has had all business leaders in town blacklist him.

Walter takes a job shoveling horse manure in a stable, and Roger hocks Walter's golf clubs to finance their move into a rundown apartment in Watts, Los Angeles. Walter announces they will part company as soon as Roger gets a job. While Roger is out, Vivian and Nelson visit Walter in the apartment, telling him they miss him and plan to treat him better than before, while looking after Roger so Walter can leave him without guilt. He takes the deal, but when, after they leave, a cop chases Roger on suspicion of criminal activity, Walter creates a diversion and gets arrested in Roger's place; Roger visits Walter in jail and tells him that he never wanted anything material from him but simply wished that he would accept him as his son.

Upon returning to San Marino with his job and family restored, Walter is dismayed by Nelson’s worldview and walks out. As he seeks to meet Roger again, Garvey reveals that Roger graduated from high school at age 16 and is a pre-med college student at Walter's old alma mater, Northwestern University. He takes Walter to where Roger is at the side of the road working on his car; Walter tells him that he plans to work for an old acquaintance in order to live near Roger—and finally lets Roger call him "Dad". Walter decides to stay with Roger's Aunt Clara as a full part of Roger's life. As the movie ends, Walter proudly rides in Roger's jalopy, accepting an old picture from Roger of Walter and Lorraine.

== Cast ==
- George Segal as Walter Whitney, Roger's biological father
- Susan Saint James as Vivian Whitney, Roger's stepmother
- Jack Warden as Nelson Longhurst, Vivian's father and Roger's maternal step-grandfather
- Dick Martin as Victor Bard
- Denzel Washington as Roger Porter
- Paul Winfield as Bob Garvey
- Tom Poston as Reverend Hayworth
- Macon McCalman as Tubby Wederholt
- Vicky Dawson as Mary Ann Whitney, Roger's younger stepsister
- Parley Baer as Dr. Bristol
- Vernon Weddle as Wardlow
- Edward Marshall as Freddie
- Ed Call as Basketball Father
- Angelina Estrada as Bianca
- Carmen Filpi as Wino
- Warren Munson as Guard
- Kenneth White as Burly Man

== Production ==
The film was the first to be produced by RKO Pictures in 23 years, after it had declined in the 1950s and stopped making new films. The Hemdale Film Corporation and RKO co-financed the film, and CBS paid $3 million to fund post-production in exchange for allowing television screenings of the film on its network. Avco Embassy Pictures later received the rights to distribute the film in the United States, while Carolco Pictures received international distribution rights.

Principal photography began on May 19, 1980, at the Samuel Goldwyn Studio in Hollywood, California, and concluded in July 1980. The production used 25 locations in Southern California, including Malibu and Lancaster.

Carbon Copy initially received an R rating from the MPAA, but it was reduced to a PG rating on appeal.

== Release ==
The film premiered with a benefit screening at the Directors Guild Theater in Los Angeles attended by former Vice President Walter Mondale, with proceeds going to the Hamburger Home. The film was released on VHS, Betamax, and LaserDisc in 1983 by Embassy Home Entertainment and on DVD in 2004 by MGM Home Entertainment in a pan and scan format. Shout! Factory, under license from MGM, released the film in its original widescreen format on Blu-ray in 2018.

== Reception ==
Janet Maslin of The New York Times labeled the film as one that "isn't a realistic movie, but it's just serious enough to raise issues that can't easily be laughed off."
