= Of Mice and Men (1968 film) =

1968 film by Ted Kotcheff

- Based on: Of Mice and Men (1937 novella) (1937 play) by John Steinbeck
- Written by: John Hopkins
- Directed by: Ted Kotcheff
- Country of origin: United States
- Original language: English

Production
- Executive producer: David Susskind
- Running time: 120 minutes

Original release
- Network: ABC
- Release: January 31, 1968

Of Mice and Men is a 1968 American television film, based on John Steinbeck's 1937 novella and stage play. It is directed by Ted Kotcheff and stars George Segal as George and Nicol Williamson as Lennie. It originally aired on January 31, 1968 as part of ABC's "Theatre Nights" program.

== Plot summary ==
Two ranch workers, George and Lennie, looking for work and happiness during the Great Depression, but luck is not in their cards, tragic events follow them.

== Cast ==
- George Segal as George
- Nicol Williamson as Lennie
- Dana Elcar as Carlson
- Will Geer as Candy
- Don Gordon as Curley
- Joey Heatherton as Curley's Wife
- Moses Gunn as Crooks
- Donald Moffat as Slim
- John Randolph as Whit
- James Hall

== Production ==
The text was censored for television.
