= Russian Roulette (film) =

- Directed by: Lou Lombardo
- Written by: Stanley Mann (writer); Arnold Margolin (writer); Jack Trolley (screenplay)
- Based on: Kosygin is Coming (novel) by Tom Ardies
- Produced by: Elliott Kastner; Jerry Bick
- Starring: George Segal; Cristina Raines; Denholm Elliott; Gordon Jackson; Peter Donat; Richard Romanus
- Cinematography: Brian West
- Edited by: Richard Marden
- Music by: Michael J. Lewis
- Production companies: Bulldog; ITC Films
- Distributed by: Rank Film Distribution (United Kingdom); Avco Embassy (United States)
- Release dates: 20 August 1975 (US); 2 May 1976 (UK)
- Running time: 93 minutes
- Countries: Canada; United Kingdom
- Language: English

Russian Roulette is a 1975 British-Canadian thriller film directed by Lou Lombardo and starring George Segal, Cristina Raines and Denholm Elliott. It was written by Stanley Mann, Arnold Margolin and Jack Trolley, based on the 1975 novel Kosygin is Coming by Tom Ardies.

== Plot ==
Shaver, a disgraced former Royal Canadian Mounted Police officer, receives an offer to keep an eye on a Latvian dissident during an upcoming visit to Vancouver by a renegade Soviet Premier in exchange for eventually being reinstated to the force. However, upon accepting the assignment, he finds himself engulfed in a KGB conspiracy to kill the premier during his visit and must clear his own name.

== Cast ==
- George Segal as Corporal Timothy Shaver
- Cristina Raines as Bogna Kirchoff
- Bo Brundin as Colonel Sergi Vostick
- Denholm Elliott as Commander Petapiece
- Gordon Jackson as Hardison
- Peter Donat as Inspector Peter McDermott
- Richard Romanus as Raymond Ragulin
- Nigel Stock as Ferguson
- Val Avery as Rudolph Henke
- Louise Fletcher as Midge
- Graham Jarvis as Bension, RCMP
- Constantine Gregory as Samuel
- Doug McGrath as Lars
- Jacques Sandulescu as Gorki, KGB Goon
- Wally Marsh as Taggart
- Hagan Beggs as Kavinsky

== Production ==
The film was the directorial debut for Lombardo, who is noted primarily as a film editor. It was filmed primarily in Vancouver, where the story also took place.

== Release ==
After being released theatrically in 1975, the film was released to home video on VHS in 1986, and on DVD by Shout! Factory in October 2013 as part of a double feature with Love and Bullets, a 1979 Charles Bronson thriller.

== Reception ==
Jonathan Rosenbaum wrote in The Monthly Film Bulletin: "Russian Roulette is a watchable if forgettable thriller which reflects the work of Lombardo's one-time employer [Robert Altman] in only marginal respects. ... Of the actors, the only disappointment (apart from the fact that Louise Fletcher is given so little to do) is Cristina Raines: her habit in Nashville of wrinkling her nose disdainfully at nearly everything she encounters seems to have completely taken over her repertoire of responses, whether she is confronting a corpse in her bathroom or George Segal arriving late for a date, and throughout the film she remains as improbably unruffled as her suede jacket."

Variety wrote: "A creditable directing debut by film editor Lou Lombardo, occasionally generates Day Of The Jackal type of suspense, though Segal's playing is lacklustre and supporting cast varies in quality. ... Tech credits include lenser Brian West's interesting use of Vancouver landscapes and inclement weather, brassy and somewhat overdone music by Michael J. Lewis, and effective stunt coordination by Bill Couch and Alf Joint."
