= The Owl and the Pussycat (film) =

1970 film by Herbert Ross

- Theatrical release poster
- Directed by: Herbert Ross
- Screenplay by: Buck Henry
- Based on: The Owl and the Pussycat; 1964 play by Bill Manhoff
- Produced by: Ray Stark
- Starring: Barbra Streisand; George Segal
- Cinematography: Harry Stradling; Andrew Laszlo
- Edited by: John F. Burnett
- Music by: Richard Halligan
- Production company: Rastar
- Distributed by: Columbia Pictures
- Release date: November 3, 1970 (New York City)
- Running time: 95 minutes
- Country: United States
- Language: English
- Box office: $23.6 million (domestic)

The Owl and the Pussycat is a 1970 American romantic comedy film directed by Herbert Ross from a screenplay by Buck Henry, based on the 1964 play of the same name by Bill Manhoff. The film follows Doris (Barbra Streisand), a somewhat uneducated actress, model, and part-time sex worker who moves in temporarily with her neighbor Felix (George Segal), an intellectual aspiring writer. Despite their many obvious differences, the two begin to admire each other over time. Comedian and actor Robert Klein appears in a supporting role.

== Plot ==
Felix Sherman, a meek book clerk and aspiring novelist, struggles to maintain peace and quiet in his walkup New York City apartment. When he reports to his landlord that his brash, uneducated neighbor Doris is working as a prostitute, she is suddenly evicted. Doris immediately confronts Felix in the middle of the night. Felix, who had not intended for Doris to be evicted, reluctantly allows her to stay at his apartment temporarily.

Later that same night, Doris dares Felix to disrobe, to which she reacts with a laughing fit that gives her a furious case of the hiccups. She asks Felix to scare her so that she stop hiccuping. He obliges, dressing up in a skeleton Halloween costume and jumping at her suddenly. She instinctively acts in self-defense, and the noise of their scuffle causes the landlord (and several neighbors) to barge in and evict both.

In the middle of the night, Felix and Doris relocate to the apartment of Felix's friend and co-worker, Barney. The two very different personalities continue to clash throughout the night as Felix tries in vain to maintain his routine and to try to get some sleep. The TV-loving Doris becomes upset after Felix reads her an excerpt from his novel, which she vehemently dislikes, and the noise from their argument causes Barney and his girlfriend to leave. Nevertheless, as Felix and Doris get to know each other better, discussing topics such as Doris' various stage names, they grow to like each other and they have sex. However, in the morning, their fighting resumes and Doris leaves in anger.

Felix and Doris return to their separate lives and both struggle in their careers. Felix passes a theater showing an adult film starring Doris and decides to watch it out of curiosity. He becomes uncomfortable and leaves midway through the film. Now a week after Doris had left, one of Doris' friends, Eleanor, goes to the bookstore where Felix works and mistakenly confronts Barney instead of him. Eleanor then tells Felix that Doris is at a cafe, where Felix goes to meet her. They two walk around the city near Lincoln Center, now clearly drawn to each other and Felix is impressed by how Doris has been working on expanding her vocabulary. However, their night is interrupted when they have to run away from a group of violent youths.

They then go to an upscale townhouse where Felix is staying, and discovers more details about Doris' past that make him uncomfortable, while Doris discovers that Felix is actually engaged to be married. When Felix is feverish, Doris puts him in bed and tells him that she is planning to move to Los Angeles and that she has thought about the excerpt from his novel that he had read to her before and now really likes it. He kisses her and they have sex again. They then get stoned and continue to bond. Suddenly, Felix's fiancée and her parents return and discover Felix and Doris both stoned in the bathtub.

Kicked out of the townhouse and no longer high, Doris and a frustrated Felix, carrying his typewriter, walk together in Central Park that morning. They start to argue and Felix cruelly ridicules Doris on top of Cedar Hill. She starts to cry and a regretful Felix kisses her hand before she smacks him. Felix admits to her that his actual name is Fred and he tosses his typewriter down the hill. Doris reveals that her full name is Doris Wilgus. Without any pretensions between each other, they walk away together as a happy couple.

== Cast ==
- Barbra Streisand as Doris
- George Segal as Felix Sherman
- Robert Klein as Barney
- Allen Garfield as Dress Shop Proprietor
- Roz Kelly as Eleanor
- Jacques Sandulescu as Rapzinsky, The Landlord
- Jack Manning as Mr. Weyderhaus
- Grace Carney as Mrs. Weyderhaus
- Barbara Anson as Miss Weyderhaus
- Kim Chan as Theatre Cashier
- Stan Gottlieb as Coatcheck Man
- Joe Madden as Old Man Neighbor
- Fay Sappington as Old Woman Neighbor
- Marilyn Chambers as Barney's Girl (credited as Evelyn Lang)

== Background ==
The screenplay, written by Buck Henry, was based on the stage play of the same name by Bill Manhoff. In the stage version, the would-be writer and the would-be actress are the only characters. Though the race of the characters is not specified in the script of the play, in the original Broadway production (1964–1965), the "Owl" was played by white actor Alan Alda and the "Pussycat" by black actress and singer Diana Sands, and many subsequent productions followed this precedent; the film version omitted the characters' interracial relationship.

== Soundtrack ==
The film's soundtrack album features comedy dialogue from Streisand and Segal along with music from the jazz-rock group Blood, Sweat & Tears.

== Deleted scenes ==
Barbra Streisand filmed a nude/topless scene for The Owl and the Pussycat that was cut from the film. Streisand told the press: "The director of 'The Owl and the Pussycat' wanted a topless shot, and I agreed on two conditions — one, there would be nobody in the room but George [Segal]; two, I had the right to kill the shot if I didn't think it would work." In November 1979, the U.S. pornographic magazine High Society published the nude frames that were cut from the film. Streisand sued High Society for publishing the celebrity nude shots.

== Cultural references ==
Mad published a spoof of the film in its September 1971 issue, in which much is made of Doris' profanity. At the end, Felix first throws his typewriter down an embankment, saying that the pretentious words he's used as a writer made him sick, then he throws her over: "Four-letter words make me even sicker! So long, Foul-Mouth!"

== Reception ==
=== Box office ===
The Owl and the Pussycat opened at Loew's State II and Cine Theatres in New York City grossing $100,206 for the week, ranking 20th at the US box office. It grossed $23,681,338 in the United States and Canada, making it the 10th highest-grossing film of 1970, generating rentals of $11,645,000.

=== Critical response ===
Stanley Kauffmann of The New Republic wrote, "if computers can turn out romantic comedies, the results would be a lot like The Owl and the Pussycat".

On the review aggregator website Rotten Tomatoes, 82% of 11 critics' reviews are positive, with an average rating of 6.4/10.

=== Accolades ===
Barbra Streisand received a nomination for the Golden Globe Award for Best Actress – Motion Picture Musical or Comedy, her 3rd in this category. She also ranked 2nd place in Laurel Award for Best Comedy Performance, Female. George Segal also ranked 2nd place in National Society of Film Critics Award for Best Actor. Buck Henry was also nominated for Writers Guild of America Award for Best Comedy Adapted from Another Medium.

== See also ==
- List of American films of 1970
