= The Black Bird =

1975 film

- Theatrical poster by Drew Struzan
- Directed by: David Giler
- Screenplay by: David Giler
- Story by: Gordon Cotler; Don Mankiewicz
- Produced by: George Segal; Ray Stark; Lou Lombardo; Michael Levee
- Starring: George Segal; Stéphane Audran; Lionel Stander; Lee Patrick
- Cinematography: Philip H. Lathrop
- Edited by: Lou Lombardo
- Music by: Jerry Fielding
- Production company: Rastar
- Distributed by: Columbia Pictures
- Release date: December 25, 1975
- Running time: 110 minutes
- Country: United States
- Language: English

The Black Bird is a 1975 American comedy mystery film written and directed by David Giler and starring George Segal and Stéphane Audran. It is a comedic sequel to the John Huston film version of The Maltese Falcon (1941) with Segal playing Sam Spade's son, Sam Spade, Jr., and Lee Patrick and Elisha Cook Jr. reprising their roles of Effie Perrine and Wilmer Cook. It was Giler's first and only directorial effort.

== Plot ==
When San Francisco private detective Sam Spade dies, his son, Sam, Jr., inherits his father's agency, including the sarcastic secretary, Effie Perine (also known as "Godzilla"). He must also continue his father's tradition of "serving minorities" (with "spade" double-entendres). When Caspar Gutman is killed outside Spade's building, his dying words are, "It's black and as long as your arm."

Spade is given an offer by a member of the Order of St. John's Hospital to purchase his father's useless copy of the Maltese Falcon. A punk named Gordon Immerman has been hired to make sure Spade delivers the bird. Spade later gets an offer from Wilmer Cook for the Falcon, but before they can negotiate, Cook is killed. Shortly thereafter Spade meets a beautiful and mysterious Russian woman named Anna Kemidov, daughter of the general who once owned the real Maltese Falcon. She also wants Spade's copy and is willing to seduce him to get it. Spade is soon dealing with Litvak, a bald Nazi dwarf who is surrounded by an army of Hawaiian thugs. In the ensuing chaos, Immerman tries to become Spade's partner. Spade discovers that his "false" copy may be the real thing.

== Cast ==
- George Segal as Sam Spade, Jr.
- Stéphane Audran as Anna Kemidov
- Lionel Stander as Gordon Immerman
- Lee Patrick as Effie
- Elisha Cook, Jr. as Wilmer Cook
- Felix Silla as Litvak
- Signe Hasso as Dr. Crippen
- John Abbott as DuQuai
- Connie Kreski as Decoy Girl
- Howard Jeffrey as Kerkorian
- Ken Swofford as Brad McCormack

== Production ==
Ray Stark owned the rights to The Maltese Falcon and hired David Giler to adapt. Giler tried to work on the script with his friend John Milius but they were unable to collaborate. Giler then decided to turn the project into a comedy, and Stark let him direct. It was his first and only directorial effort. During principal photography, frequent clashes occurred between Stark and star George Segal.

Lee Patrick and Elisha Cook, Jr., reprised their roles from the John Huston version of The Maltese Falcon (1941).

== Reception ==
On Rotten Tomatoes, the film has an aggregated score of 33% based on 12 reviews. Panned by critics, the film is considered the weakest adaptation of the novel. Pauline Kael wrote that it is "a dumb comedy, with an insecure tone and some good ideas mixed with some terrible ones".

== See also ==
- List of American films of 1975
