= Ambushed (1998 film) =

Film by Ernest Dickerson

- Written by: Andrew Miles
- Directed by: Ernest Dickerson
- Starring: Courtney B. Vance; Virginia Madsen; Jeremy Lelliott; William Forsythe; Charles Hallahan; David Keith; Bill Nunn; Robert Patrick; William Sadler
- Composer: Terry Plumeri
- Country of origin: United States
- Original language: English

Production
- Executive producer: Bill Bromiley
- Producers: Ric Rondell; Dave Thomas; Jonathan Josell
- Cinematography: Phil Oetiker
- Running time: 109 minutes

Original release
- Network: HBO
- Release: June 26, 1998

Ambushed is a 1998 American action thriller film directed by Ernest Dickerson and starring Courtney B. Vance. The film has also been classified as African American noir. The film premiered on HBO on June 26, 1998.

== Premise ==
The leader of a Ku Klux Klan lodge is shot dead and his son is taken into police custody for protection. The police car taking him to a safe house is ambushed and three police officers are shot dead. Officer Jerry Robinson is accused of the murders.

== Cast ==
- Courtney B. Vance as Jerry Robinson
- Jeremy Lelliott as Eric Natter
- Virginia Madsen as Lucy Monroe
- William Forsythe as Mike Organski
- David Keith as Deputy Lawrence
- Bill Nunn as Watts Fatboy
- Charles Hallahan as Sheriff Carter
- Robert Patrick as Shannon Herrold
- William Sadler as Jim Natter
- Carl Espy as Deputy Bean
- Scott Hinson as Deputy Dunbar
- William Flaman as Tom
- J. Michael Hunter as Mintz
- Scott Simpson as Richter
- Don Hall as Billy Dean
- Travis Stanberry as Danny
- Jim Grimshaw as Officer Newfield
- Ernest Dickerson Jr. as J.J. Robinson
- April Turner as Connie Jackson
- Nora Cook as Nancy Richter
- Nina Repeta as Mary Natter
- Samantha Agnoff as Karen Natter

== Production ==
Filming for Ambushed took place in North Carolina, with some filming occurring at the Orton Plantation.

== Release ==
Ambushed premiered on HBO on June 26, 1998.

== Themes ==
William Covey has classified this film, along with Across 110th Street, Deep Cover, Detroit 9000, The Glass Shield, and Devil in a Blue Dress as examples of films that "locate crime and criminality within white culture, while the moral center of each film is marked by black male heroism."

== Reception ==
Ambushed received reviews from The Chucks Connection and TV Guide, the latter of which called it " boisterous but none too convincing. ... Short on logic and long on polemics, this pumped-up action pic dashes to a predictable, preordained conclusion." The Guardian was more favorable, noting that "his unfussy, effective approach augurs well for his directorial career".
