= Charles Hallahan =

American actor (1943–1997)

- Hallahan as LAPD Captain Charlie Devane on TV series Hunter.
- Born: Charles John Hallahan; July 29, 1943; Philadelphia, Pennsylvania, U.S.
- Died: November 25, 1997 (aged 54); Los Angeles, California, U.S.
- Education: Rutgers University–Camden (BA) Temple University (MFA)
- Occupation: Actor
- Years active: 1972–1997
- Height: 5 ft 11 in (180 cm)
- Spouses: Elizabeth Widmann (m. 1970; div. 1974) Barbara Gryboski (m. 1983)
- Children: 2

Charles John Hallahan (July 29, 1943 – November 25, 1997) was an American film, television, and stage actor. His films include Going in Style and Nightwing (both 1979), The Thing (1982), Silkwood and Twilight Zone: The Movie (both 1983), Vision Quest and Pale Rider (both 1985), P.K. and the Kid (1987), Cast a Deadly Spell (1991), Executive Decision (1996), Dante's Peak (1997), and Mind Rage (2001). On television, he appeared in guest turns on The Rockford Files, Happy Days, Hawaii Five-O, Dallas, All in the Family, Soap, Good Times, The Waltons, Hart to Hart, Trapper John, M.D., M*A*S*H, Hill Street Blues, Lou Grant, The Equalizer, Wings, Picket Fences, In the Heat of the Night, Law & Order, Mad About You, Murder, She Wrote, JAG, NYPD Blue, and Coach, among many others. He is, perhaps, best known for his role as Capt. Charles "Charlie" Devane in the NBC cop action-drama Hunter from 1986 to 1991. Hallahan also appeared as a series regular in both CBS' The Paper Chase, as Ernie, from 1978 to 1979, and ABC's Grace Under Fire, as Bill Davis, from 1993 to 1994, as well as a recurring performer providing various characters' voices on the ABC children's animated series Gargoyles, from 1995 to 1996. An accomplished stage veteran, Hallahan was thrice honored with Los Angeles Drama Critics Circle Awards for Best Lead Performance for his turns in productions of Rat in the Skull in 1986, The Kentucky Cycle in 1992, and Endgame in 1995.

== Biography ==
Hallahan was born in Philadelphia to Charles John Hallahan Jr. and Margaret Catherine (née Sweeney), both of Irish Catholic descent. He grew up in Harrisburg and then Green Ridge, Delaware County, Pennsylvania. He was a student at St. James High School in Chester, graduating in 1961. After high school he served in the Navy for three years, before attending Rutgers University-Camden, graduating with a BA degree in 1968. He then continued for an MFA degree from Temple University in 1971. He moved to Los Angeles in 1977.

== Career ==
Hallahan was a member of the American Conservatory Theater and appeared in many productions there such as One Flew Over the Cuckoo’s Nest, Equus, and The Threepenny Opera. In 1977, Hallahan was a founding member of The Matrix Theatre Company in Los Angeles. performing in plays like Endgame (play) and The Seagull, and Robert Schenkkan's play, The Kentucky Cycle.

On screen, Hallahan has played Chet Wilke in Lou Grant (1979–1982). In 1982, he portrayed geologist Vance Norris in the remake of The Thing alongside Kurt Russell. He starred as LAPD Captain Charlie Devane on Hunter. He portrayed the nameless "Coach" in Vision Quest, opposite Matthew Modine. Hallahan also co-starred as a regular cast member in two popular television series, Grace Under Fire and the long-running The Paper Chase.

One of his final film roles – and arguably among his best remembered – was his portrayal of volcanologist Dr. Paul Dreyfus in the 1997 disaster-thriller film Dante's Peak, which also starred Pierce Brosnan and Linda Hamilton. His final screen turn – and his lone big-screen leading role – was as corrupt Los Angeles homicide detective Jack Stillman in the 2001 independent Hitchcockian noir-thriller Mind Rage, a film eventually released, posthumously, four years after his untimely death. In 1997, Hallahan was cast as Liam Bilby for the Star Trek: Deep Space Nine episode "Honor Among Thieves", but was replaced after having died.

== Death ==
On November 25, 1997, he died of an apparent heart attack while driving his car in Los Angeles. He left behind his wife, Barbara; two sons, Seamus and Liam; and four brothers, Michael, Kenneth, Lawrence and Thomas. His brother, Fr. Kenneth Hallahan, was a Roman Catholic priest in Camden, New Jersey. He was predeceased by his sister, Regina Macrina, an educator from Collingswood, New Jersey.

== Filmography ==
=== Film ===
- Cyrano de Bergerac (1974) as Montfleury / Cadet
- A Death in Canaan (1978) as Cpl. Sebastian
- Terror Out of The Sky (1978) as Tibbles, Sr.
- Nightwing (1979) as Henry
- Going in Style (1979) as Pete
- Hide in Plain Sight (1980) as Dixon (Bartender)
- Chicago Story (1981) as John Ryan
- Margin for Murder (1981) as Pat Chambers
- The Other Victim (1981) as Jack Berger
- Monsignor (1982) as Archbishop (uncredited)
- The Thing (1982) as Dr. Vance Norris
- Twilight Zone: The Movie (1983) as Ray (Segment #1)
- The Star Chamber (1983) as Officer Pickett (uncredited)
- Two of a Kind (1983) as Archbishop (uncredited)
- Allison Sydney Harrison (1983) as Sgt. Beatty
- Silkwood (1983) as Earl Lapin
- Kidco (1984) as Richard Cessna
- Terror in the Aisles (1984) as Henry (uncredited – archive footage from Nightwing)
- Vision Quest (1985) as Coach Ratta
- Pale Rider (1985) as McGill
- A Winner Never Quits (1986) as Nelson Gary, Sr.
- P.K. and the Kid (1987) as Bazooka
- Fatal Beauty (1987) as Sergeant Getz
- J. Edgar Hoover (1987) as Senator Joseph McCarthy
- True Believer (1989) as Vincent Dennehy
- Capone: Behind Bars (1989) as Malone
- Cast a Deadly Spell (1991) as Detective Morris Bradbury
- A Smile in the Dark (1991) as a Man
- Nails (1992) as Bud Taylor
- Body of Evidence (1993) as Dr. McCurdy
- Warlock: The Armageddon (1993) as Ethan Larson
- Dave (1993) as Policeman
- Wild Palms (1993) as Gavin Whitehope
- When Love Kills: The Seduction of John Hearn (1993) as Det. Whalen
- Roswell (1994, TV film) as Pilot MacIntire – Older
- Jack Reed: A Search for Justice (1994) as Roy Galvin
- The Return of Hunter: Everyone Walks in L.A. (1995) as Capt. Charles "Charlie" Devane
- Executive Decision (1996) as General Sarlow
- The Fan (1996) as "Coop" Cooper
- The Rich Man's Wife (1996) as Detective Dan Fredricks
- Rolling Thunder (1996) as Colonel Emerson
- Space Jam (1996) as Baron's Team Owner (uncredited)
- Things That Go Bump (1997) as Chief Garrett
- The Pest (1997) as Angus
- Dante's Peak (1997) as Dr. Paul Dreyfus
- Ambushed (1998) as Sheriff Carter (released posthumously)
- The Thing: Terror Takes Shape (1998) as Self / Interviewee (released posthumously)
- The Fantasticks (2000) as Sheriff (released posthumously)
- Mind Rage (2001) as Det. Jack Stillman (final film role, released posthumously)

=== Television ===
- The Rockford Files (1977) as Brian – 1 episode
- Happy Days (1977) as Truant Officer – 1 episode
- Forever Fernwood as Buddy – 1 episode
- Hawaii Five-O (1977) as Larry Kent – 1 episode
- Magic Mongo (1977) as Spike – 1 episode
- The Ted Knight Show (1978) as Lodge Member – 1 episode
- James at 16 (1978) as Coach Goth – 1 episode
- Dallas (1978) as Harry Ritlin – 1 episode
- All in the Family (1978) as Officer Harrison – 1 episode
- Soap (1979) as Lance – 1 episode
- Family (1979) as Watch Commander – 1 episode
- The Paper Chase (1978–1979) as Ernie – 16 episodes
- Good Times (1979) as Sergeant Curry – 1 episode
- The Waltons (1979) as Assistant Director Baker – 1 episode
- Skag (1980) as Fisher – 1 episode
- Hart to Hart (1980) as Coach Warren Sanford – 1 episode
- Trapper John, M.D. (1981) as Sam – 1 episode
- M* A* S* H (1981) as Colin Turnbull – 1 episode
- Riker (1981) as Jonas – 1 episode
- Hill Street Blues (1981) as Charlie Weeks – 2 episodes
- Bret Maverick (1981) as "Terrible" Fred McShane – 1 episode
- Lou Grant (1979, 1982) as Chuck / Chet Wilke – 2 episodes
- Tales of the Unexpected (1984) as Charlie / Jack Lowry – 2 episodes
- The Equalizer (1985) as George Cook – Episode: "Back Home"
- Hunter (1986–1991) as Capt. Charles "Charlie" Devane – 110 episodes
- The Law & Harry McGraw (1987) as Matt Maginnis – 1 episode
- ABC Afterschool Specials: "The Perfect Date" (1990) as Wrecker – 1 episode
- Wings (1990) as Ted Cobb – 1 episode
- Civil Wars (1992) as Ralph Negroponte – 1 episode
- Picket Fences (1992) as Greg Stone – 1 episode
- In the Heat of the Night (1993) as Bob Pinkney – 1 episode
- Sirens (1993) as Bob Witkow – 1 episode
- Law & Order (1993) as Captain Tom O'Hara – 1 episode
- Jack's Place (1993) as Frankie – 1 episode
- Grace Under Fire (1993–1994) as Bill Davis – 23 episodes
- Mad About You (1994) as "Sloopy" Dunbar – 1 episode
- Murder, She Wrote (1994) as Barry Noble – 1 episode
- Sweet Justice (1993) as Frank Kellogg – 1 episode
- JAG (1995) as General Thomas Williams – Episode: "Desert Son"
- Coach (1995) as University President Charles W. Kisley – 2 episodes
- Gargoyles (1995–1996) as Travis Marshall / Mr. Jaffe / Macduff / Janitor / Quarryman – (voices) – 11 episodes
- Sisters (1995, 1996) as William 'Will' Griffin, Sr. – 2 episodes
- Almost Perfect (1996) as Tom Ryan – 2 episodes
- NYPD Blue (1997) as Earl Dawkins – 1 episode
- The Visitor (1997) as Sheriff – 1 episode
- Players (1997) as Jack Clancy – 1 episode
- 4th Screen Actors Guild Awards (1998) as Self / "In Memoriam" – 1 episode
- Minty Comedic Arts (2021) as Dr. Paul Dreyfus (archive footage from Dante's Peak) – 1 episode

== Accolades ==
- Rat in the Skull – Winner – Los Angeles Drama Critics Circle Award for Best Lead Performance (1986)
- The Kentucky Cycle – Winner – Los Angeles Drama Critics Circle Award for Best Lead Performance (1992)
- Endgame – Winner – Los Angeles Drama Critics Circle for Best Lead Performance (1995)

== See also ==
- Back Stage West Garland Awards, first annual awards dedicated honor to Hallahan
