= Herb Freed =

American film director and screenwriter

- Born: Herbert Freed; 1935 (age 90–91); Youngstown, Ohio, U.S.
- Occupations: Film director, screenwriter
- Spouse: Anne Marisse (m. 1964; died 1984) Marion Segal (m. 1985; died 2011)

Herb Freed (born 1935) is an American film director and screenwriter best known for a number of horror films made in the 1970s and 1980s. His feature credits include Haunts (1976), Beyond Evil (1980), and Graduation Day (1981).

== Biography ==
Freed was born in 1935 in Youngstown, Ohio, the son of Russian-Jewish immigrants.

Prior to embarking on a filmmaking career, Freed served as rabbi at Temple Beth Shalom in Mahopac, New York for eight years before resigning. He relocated to Los Angeles with the intent of making films.

He made his feature film debut with A.W.O.L. (1972) before co-writing and directing the psychological horror film Haunts (1976), starring May Britt and Cameron Mitchell; the latter was co-written with his then-wife, Anne Marisse. In 1980, he directed the supernatural horror film Beyond Evil, starring John Saxon and Lynda Day George.

== Personal life ==
Freed and screenwriter Anne Marisse were married from 1964 until her death from cancer in 1984. Freed married film editor Marion Segal in 1985. The couple were married until her death on December 22, 2011.

== Filmography ==
Year	Title	Director	Screenwriter	Notes	Ref.
1972	A.W.O.L.	Yes	Yes		
1976	Haunts	Yes	Yes		
1980	Beyond Evil	Yes	Yes		
1981	Graduation Day	Yes	Yes		
1985	Tomboy	Yes	No		
1987	Survival Game	Yes	Yes		
1992	Stickin' Together	Yes	Yes		
1996	Subterfuge	Yes	No		
1999	Dead Punkz	Yes	Yes		
1999	Paradise Lost	Yes	Yes		
