= Haunts (film) =

- Theatrical poster
- Directed by: Herb Freed
- Written by: Anne Marisse; Herb Freed
- Produced by: Burt Weissbourd; Herb Freed
- Starring: May Britt; Cameron Mitchell; Aldo Ray; William Gray Espy
- Cinematography: Larry Secrist
- Edited by: Richard E. Westover
- Music by: Pino Donaggio
- Distributed by: Intercontinental Releasing Corporation
- Release dates: August 27, 1976 (Indianapolis); December 22, 1976 (Hill Air Force Base)
- Running time: 97 minutes
- Country: United States
- Language: English

Haunts is a 1976 American psychological horror film directed by Herb Freed, and starring May Britt, Cameron Mitchell, and Aldo Ray. Its plot follows a young woman living on a farm with her uncle, whom she suspects of committing several murders of young girls in the area. The screenplay was written by Freed and his wife, Anne Marisse, and was inspired by a series of repressed memories Freed experienced after his wife witnessed a car accident.

== Plot ==
Ingrid is a young Swedish woman residing with her American uncle Carl at his farm in rural Northern California. One night, a local young girl is murdered with a pair of scissors by an unknown assailant. Her killing baffles the town locals. Meanwhile, Bill Spry, a new addition to the church choir in which Ingrid sings, takes an interest in Ingrid, but she is evasive. En route home one night, Ingrid is attacked by a masked figure, but manages to escape. The attack triggers memories of Ingrid's sexual molestation by her father, and the subsequent suicide of her mother. Later that evening, a local woman, Nell, is attacked and murdered in her car following an angry interaction with Bill at a tavern.

The following morning, Ingrid finds Nell's mutilated body on the farm; she has been stabbed with a pair of scissors. After police remove the body and interview her, Ingrid is left alone at the farmhouse. While she takes a shower, a town butcher, Frankie, breaks in and attacks her before raping her. Carl returns home in the middle of the assault, but is unaware it is happening. Frankie threatens Ingrid before leaving the house. The next evening, Ingrid prays at the local church, but is interrupted when Frankie arrives to confess his transgression to the vicar. Ingrid leaves, and Frankie again attacks her outside, but the rape is thwarted when the vicar hears her screaming.

Ingrid is hospitalized and visited by Sheriff Peterson; outside her room, the vicar informs Sheriff Peterson that his daughter, Loretta, is carrying Frankie's child. Peterson quickly drives to Frankie's house and attacks him, handcuffing him to a pipe and chastising Loretta. Meanwhile, local police encounter a masked assailant attack a woman on the street, and chase after him. Just before he is about to arrest Frankie for the killings, Peterson receives a phone call on Frankie's landline from deputies notifying him they have cornered the killer at the saw mill. The assailant is shot dead, and when unmasked, revealed as Bill.

That night, Ingrid sees news footage notifying residents that Bill was the killer. Shortly after, Frankie arrives at the house, binding and gagging Carl. Ingrid attacks Frankie with a fire poke before stabbing him to death. Carl dissuades her from contacting the police and buries Frankie, but Ingrid flees to the police station anyway to explain what happened. The next morning, Peterson and the deputies search the property; Carl has fled, and only Ingrid is there. During the search, Peterson is startled to see Frankie arrive at the house; simultaneously, the deputies find Ingrid's goat buried in a shallow grave in the yard. Peterson goes upstairs to confront Ingrid, and finds her dead in the bathroom of suicide.

At Ingrid's funeral, Carl, who appears older, meets Peterson, and the two depart together. Peterson explains to Carl that Ingrid's alleged attacks from Frankie were hallucinations, and that the physical evidence collected after them showed no evidence of Frankie being at the scene; additionally, her autopsy confirmed she was a virgin. Carl explains that he has not visited her in a very long time, suggesting that their encounters were also imaginary. He then returns to the farmhouse and enters the bathroom. Steam suddenly fills the room, and Ingrid's apparition appears behind him in the vanity reflection.

== Cast ==
- May Britt as Ingrid Svensen
- Cameron Mitchell as Carl Henderson
- Aldo Ray as Sheriff Peterson
- William Gray Espy as Frankie
- Ben Hammer as Vicar
- E. J. André as the doctor
- Kendall Jackson as Loretta Peterson
- Susan Nohr as Nell
- Robert Hippard as Bill Spry
- Don Dolan as Hellman
- Lette Rehnolds as Margaret
- Jim McKeny as the bartender

== Production ==
According to Freed, he and his wife, Anne Marisse, co-authored the screenplay after he experienced a series of repressed memories following Marisse's witnessing of a car accident. Freed characterized the film as "a look at a woman's psyche, and it's very powerful." The film was shot on location in Mendocino, California. Actor Cameron Mitchell recalled the film as "very strange," and he was unsure of director Freed's vision. Mitchell also stated that in the original cut of the film, his character embraced Ingrid, which was excised in post-production. The film's working title was The Veil.

== Release ==
Haunts opened theatrically in the United States on August 27, 1976, screening in Indianapolis, Indiana. Director Freed returned to the city again for an October 1, 1976 screening of the film. According to Freed, during a limited engagement screening in Fort Bragg, California, the film out-grossed The Exorcist (1973) and The Shootist (1976). It subsequently screened at the Hill Air Force Base near Ogden, Utah, on December 22, 1976.

=== Critical response ===
Leonard Maltin wrote a favorable review of the film, noting: "You have to stay with it to appreciate this offbeat horror pic fully, but it's well worth the effort." However, Roger Ebert selected this film as his "Dog of the Week" on a 1981 episode of his show Sneak Previews, calling it "confusing" with an "incomprehensible plot." TV Guide also deemed it a "laughable low-budget effort," awarding it one out of five stars. The Terror Trap rated the film three out of five stars, calling it "A difficult but rewarding slasher-cum-psychological character study", and praised the film's score, Britt's performance, conclusion, and editing.

== Sources ==
- Maltin, Leonard (1987). Leonard Maltin's TV Movies and Video Guide. New York City, New York: New American Library. p. 406. ISBN 978-0-452-25994-2.
- Weaver, Tom (2003). Double Feature Creature Attack: A Monster Merger of Two More Volumes of Classic Interviews. Jefferson, North Carolina: McFarland. ISBN 978-0-786-48215-3.
