= Felony (band) =

American new wave and rock band (1974–1991)

- Origin: Los Angeles, California
- Genre: New wave
- Years active: 1974–1991
- Label: Rock 'n Roll
- Past members: Jeff Spry; Joe Spry

Felony was an American new wave and rock band formed in Los Angeles, California, in the early 1970s by brothers Jeffrey Scott Spry (lead vocals), Joseph Anthony Spry (guitars and vocals), brothers Danny Sands (piano and keyboards) and Steve Sands (sound engineer).

== History ==
After a period playing shows and making music business connections in the Los Angeles scene, Felony appeared in the horror b-movie Graduation Day (1981), playing their song "Gangsters of Rock." Soon after, they signed with producers/managers Don Rubin, formerly of pop group The Ivy Three, and Artie Kornfeld. Live shows mixed by sound engineer Steve Sands, who is also credited as second engineer on the debut album “The Fanatic”

During the developmental stage of Felony, Jeffrey Spry left the band briefly to be the singer with Detroit Proto-Punk/Hard rock legends, Ron Asheton (of Iggy & The Stooges) and Dennis "Machine Gun" Thompson (of The MC5) in a short lived super-group (based in Los Angeles) that was called "The New Order" (preceding the English new wave group of the same name). He quickly returned to Felony and continued working with his brother Joe and the other members of the band.

Felony went into the studio and emerged with single "The Fanatic," which became a hit on Los Angeles radio station KROQ-FM with help from program director Rick Carroll. The song peaked at No. 42 on the Billboard Hot 100 in early 1983. It became a key track in the development of the Modern Rock radio format. "The Fanatic" was included in the influential 1983 Valley Girl soundtrack, which also featured Modern English's "I Melt With You". Felony also performed the track on American Bandstand. A video was made from "The Fanatic" "The Fanatic" video was shot in Hollywood, California, in 1983 and aired on MTV. The Fanatic video includes a cameo of Jeffrey Spry with his first wife, SAG actress, Lucrecia Sarita Russo. The song was also featured in the film The Lonely Lady, also in 1983.

The band, which now included Jeffrey on lead vocals, Joe on guitar, Danny Sands on piano/keyboards, Louis Ruiz on bass and Arty Blea on drums, recorded their first full-length album, also called The Fanatic, which was released in 1983 on Scotti Brothers Records with distribution by CBS Records. It included the single and nine other tracks that helped define the trendy-but-never-huge power-pop new wave sound of the early 1980s.

Felony's second single was 1983's "The Pied Piper," which producer Kornfeld had written with Steve Duboff in the 1960s and which had been a hit for Crispian St. Peters and Cher. "Kristine" from The Fanatic was also a single in 1983.

The band recorded songs including "All the King's Horses" and "She's My Little Girl" for a second album on Scotti Brothers that never materialized. The original chemistry was never recaptured, and in 1985 EM-HI released Felony's sophomore effort The Vigilante, which featured a more traditional rock sound. The title track got a lot of radio play and was number two in the KROQ Top 106.7 Countdown of 1985." The Vigilante also featured the track "I'm No Animal," which appeared on the soundtrack of 1986's Friday the 13th Part VI: Jason Lives.

Felony's final album, In the Name of Rock-n-Roll was self funded and produced by Joe and Ron Merenstein. Negotiations between Felony and a record label for release of this work stalled because of the label's unwillingness to give Joe production credit. The band disbanded and the Spry brothers went their separate ways each working on new projects. Jeffrey Scott Spry committed suicide on March 9, 1992. March 10, 1992 was the re-release of the Fanatic. Joe formed his latest band, Kanawormz, with bass player John Avila of Oingo Boingo fame. The supporting members of Kanawormz have changed over the years, but Joe continues to create music and is now working on the fifth CD set for release at the end of 2023.

"The Fanatic" was featured in the 2011 film "Take Me Home Tonight".

== Discography ==
"Gangsters of Rock" from Graduation Day (1981)

"The Fanatic"
Year: 1983
Tracks: The Fanatic/The Girl Ain't Straight
Label: Rock 'n' Roll
Catalog #: 3497
Formats: 7", 12"

The Fanatic
Year: 1983
Tracks: 1. The Fanatic, 2. No Room in Heaven, 3. One Step, 4. Positively Negative, 5. Aggravated Man, 6. What a Way to Go, 7. Kristine, 8. The Girl Ain't Straight, 9. Teaser, 10. 666 Beware.
Label: Rock 'n' Roll
Catalog #: 38453
Formats: LP, CS, CD

"Pied Piper"
Year: 1983
Tracks: Pied Piper (long), Pied Piper (short)
Label: Rock 'n' Roll
Catalog #: 04220
Formats: 7"

"Kristine"
Year: 1983
Tracks: Kristine, Kristine
Label: Rock 'n' Roll
Catalog #: 03999
Formats: 7"

Catalog #: Q-999
Formats: LP, CD

=== Compilation appearances ===
Valley Girl Soundtrack
Year: 1983
Tracks: The Fanatic
Label: Rhino/WEA
Catalog#:
Formats: CD, CS

Richard Blade's Flashback Favorites, Vol. 3
Year: 1994
Tracks: The Fanatic
Label: Oglio Records
Catalog#:
Formats: CD, CS

Just Can't Get Enough: New Wave Hits of the '80s, Vol. 11
Year: 1995
Tracks: The Fanatic
Label: Rhino/WEA
Catalog #:
Formats: CD, CS

Alternative 80's Hits
Year: 1998
Tracks: The Fanatic
Label: Rhino
Catalog #:
Formats: CD

=== Television appearances ===
American Bandstand
First Aired: Saturday April 30, 1983
Tracks: The Fanatic, What a Way to Go
Episode Number: 2534
Season Number: 26
