= E. J. André =

American actor (1908–1984)

E.J. André
- Born: Elmore Joseph Andre; August 14, 1908; Detroit, Michigan, U.S.
- Died: September 6, 1984 (aged 76); Hollywood, California, U.S.
- Occupation: Actor
- Years active: 1958–1984
- Organization: Screen Actors Guild

Elmore Joseph Andre (August 14, 1908 – September 6, 1984), known professionally as E. J. André, was an American writer, director, and actor on stage, film and television, perhaps best known for portraying Uncle Jed and various other bit roles on Little House on the Prairie, and Eugene Bullock on Dallas.

== Career ==
Andre's early work included writing and directing productions for the Nine O'Clock Players, which performed for disabled children.

His film debut came later at the urging of his agent, beginning with a role as the Sheik of Hazerath in Cecil B. DeMille's The Ten Commandments (1956).

During his 28-year film and television career he was a notable character actor, cast in the role of uncle, grandfather, doctor, farmer, educator, politician, clergyman, judge, and the like. Film appearances include Omar Khayyam (1957), Battle at Bloody Beach (1961), Red Nightmare (1962), The Shakiest Gun in the West (1968), The Arrangement (1969), The Lawyer (1970), Papillon (1973), Haunts (1976), Nickelodeon (1976), The Lincoln Conspiracy (1977), Magic (1978), Nickle Mountain (1984), and a posthumous 1987 appearance in Evil Town, among others.

On television, he was a familiar face as guest cast in 77 Sunset Strip, 87th Precinct, Adam 12, The Alfred Hitchcock Hour, The Big Valley, Blue Light, Bonanza, Bronco, Burke's Law, Cannon, Charlie's Angels, Dallas, The Dakotas, Death Valley Days, The Flying Nun, The Fugitive, Greatest Heroes of the Bible, The Green Hornet, Gunsmoke, Harry O, I Dream of Jeannie, Laredo, Little House on the Prairie, Love, American Style, Mannix, Nichols, Night Gallery, Perry Mason, Peter Gunn, Petticoat Junction, Quincy, M.E., Shane, Shirley Temple's Storybook, Starsky & Hutch, Switch, Surfside 6, Wagon Train, The Waltons, Whispering Smith, Temple Houston, and more.

== Death ==
Andre died in his Hollywood home at the age of 76 of cancer.

== Filmography ==
A partial filmography follows.

=== Film ===
- The Ten Commandments (1956) as the Sheik of Hazerath
- Omar Khayyam (1957) as Nobleman (uncredited)
- Battle at Bloody Beach (1961) as Dr. Van Bart
- Red Nightmare (1962, Short) as Malenko (uncredited)
- Showdown (1963) as Station Master (uncredited)
- Mosby's Marauders (1967) as Uncle Ferd
- Tammy and the Millionaire (1967) as Jeremy (uncredited)
- The Shakiest Gun in the West (1968) as Will Banks (uncredited)
- The Arrangement (1969) as Uncle Joe
- The Lawyer (1970) as F.J. Williamson
- There Was a Crooked Man... (1970) as Judge (uncredited)
- Papillon (1973) as Old Con
- The Duchess and the Dirtwater Fox (1976) as Prospector
- Haunts (1976) as Doc
- Nickelodeon (1976) as Stage Performer
- Moonshine County Express (1977) as Lawyer Green
- The Lincoln Conspiracy (1977) as Rep. Thaddeus Stevens
- Magic (1978) as Merlin
- Nickle Mountain (1984) as Kuzitski
- Evil Town (1987) as Earl (final film role)

=== Television ===
- Peter Gunn (1958) as Poet
- Shirley Temple's Storybook (1958) as Lama
- Whispering Smith (1961) as Philo Blanch
- Wagon Train (1961-1964)
  - "The Patience Miller Story" as Mr. Wise
  - "The Geneva Balfour Story" as Simon Turpin
- 87th Precinct (1962) as Sammy
- Bronco (1962) as Murdo
- Surfside 6 (1962) as Captain Willisett / Manager
  - "Who Is Sylvia?" as Manager
  - "House on Boca Key" as Captain Willisett
- Death Valley Days (1962-1967)
  - "The Private Mint of Clark, Gruber and Co." as Gus
  - "Along Came Mariana" as Domingo
- Bonanza (1962-1972)
  - "The Long Night" as Prospector
  - "A Passion for Justice" as Jeb
  - "The Trouble with Trouble" as Judge
  - "Shanklin" as Yost
- The Dakotas (1963) as Judge Langford
- Rawhide (1963, Episode: "Abilene") as Doctor
- 77 Sunset Strip (1963) as Jenkins
- Temple Houston. (1963) as Judge Diversey
- The Virginian (1963-1968)
  - "The Man Who Couldn't Die" as Alex
  - "Ride a Dark Trail" as Cook
  - "The Intruders" as Alex the Cook
  - "A Slight Case of Charity" as Freight Agent
  - "The Claim" as Cook
  - "A Bad Place to Die" as Old Rancher
  - "The Crooked Path" as Cookey
- Perry Mason (1964, Episode: "The Case of the Tragic Trophy") as Druggist
- The Alfred Hitchcock Hour (1965)
  - "Where the Woodbine Twineth" as The Preacher
  - "An Unlocked Window" as Sam Isles
- Burke's Law (1965) as Dr. Brenner
- The Wild Wild West (1965-1968)
  - "The Night of a Thousand Eyes as The Proprietor
  - "The Night of the Howling Light as Hospital Superintendent
  - "The Night of the Doomsday Formula as Dr. Crane
- I Dream of Jeannie (1966) as Pierre Millay
- Blue Light (1966) as Albert Levaux
- The Fugitive (1966) as Old Man
- Laredo (1966) as Silversmith
- Shane (1966, Episode: "The Great Invasion") as Bullhead O'Reilly
- The Green Hornet (1967) as Paul
- The Big Valley (1967) as Sam Williams
- Petticoat Junction (1967) as Dr. Barton Stuart
- The Flying Nun (1968) as Diogenes
- Gunsmoke (1968-1972)
  - "A Noose for Dobie Price" as Joe Karcher
  - "Eleven Dollars" as Jeb Spencer
- Mannix (1969) as Professor Mario Carvello
- Night Gallery (1970) as Charlie Peterson (segment "The Little Black Bag")
- Cannon (1971) as Van Patten
- Nichols (1971)
  - "Peanuts and Crackerjacks" as Hargut
  - "Ketcham Power" as Ed Hargut
- Adam 12 (1971-1973)
  - "Log 106: Post Time" as Martin Endicott
  - "Northwest Division" as Alex Mardigian
- Love, American Style (1973) as Julius (segment "Love and the Baby Derby")
- The Day the Earth Moved (1974) as Henry Butler
- Harry O (1974) as The Old Man
- Miles to Go Before I Sleep (1975) as Mark
- The Waltons (1975) as Hyder Snow
- Starsky & Hutch (1975) as Jenson
- Switch (1976) as Floyd Warren
- Logan's Run (1977) as Martin
- Charlie's Angels (1977) as Wendell Muse
- Dallas (1979-1983) as Eugene Bullock
  - "Return Engagements"
  - "The Venezuelan Connection"
  - "The Fourth Son"
  - "Post Nuptial"
  - "Barbecue Three"
  - "Caribbean Connection"
- Greatest Heroes of the Bible (1979)
- Little House on the Prairie (1976-1982)
  - "His Father's Son" as Amos Thoms
  - "Going Home" as Matthew Simms
  - "Gold Country" as Zachariah
  - "The Godsister" as St. Peter
  - "The Lost Ones (Part 1)" as Jed Cooper
  - "Uncle Jed" as Jed Cooper
- Nero Wolfe (1981) as Maurice Koslow
- Quincy, M.E. (1982) as Sy Schuster
- Mysterious Two (1982, TV Movie)
