= Hunger's Rogues =

1974 book by Jacques Sandulescu

Hunger's Rogues: On The Black Market In Europe, 1948
- First edition cover
- Author: Jacques Sandulescu
- Language: English
- Genre: autobiography, business, economics
- Publisher: Harcourt Brace Jovanovich
- Publication date: 1974
- Publication place: United States
- Media type: Print (Hardback)
- Pages: 280 pp (1st edition hardback)
- ISBN: 978-0-15-142991-2
- OCLC: 866543
- Dewey Decimal: 658.7 S221
- Preceded by: Donbas: A True Story of an Escape Across Russia (1968)

Hunger's Rogues (Hunger's Rogues: On The Black Market In Europe) is an autobiography written by Jacques Sandulescu (February 21, 1928 – November 19, 2010). Sandulescu was conscripted in Romania at age 16 by the occupying Soviet army in the latter days of World War II and transported to work in the coal mines of the Donbas region of Ukraine. The book describes life in Europe in the immediate aftermath of the war from the perspective of the author's experiences as a displaced person and his involvement with the black market of the time.

== Synopsis ==
Hunger's Rogues takes up the author's story about a year after he escaped from Soviet forced labor in Ukrainian mines, recounted in Donbas. The book opens in 1948 with Sandulescu approaching Transit Camp Buchholz, a camp for displaced persons, or "DPs", awaiting permission to emigrate overseas, then located outside of Hanover, Germany, near the village of Buchholz. The author describes camp and camp life, then unfolds his involvement, through friendships made in camp, with the thriving black market primarily based in the train stations of cities throughout Germany and the countries formerly occupied by the Nazi regime. After passing initial emigrant screening, Sandulescu fails the medical exam due to elevated blood pressure and is forced to remain in camp for an extended period until he can be re-tested. As he waits for the next opportunity for a medical exam, the excitement of trading on the black market continues to draw him in. Sandulescu recounts black market trades and affairs that include selling pork from a clandestine farmhouse slaughter, a trip to Belgium disguised as a US soldier to buy 150 pounds of coffee and a trip in the company of a Red Army officer from the Balkans to Paris to buy and peddle cigarettes. He gives market prices for black market goods, primarily food, and the exchange rate in terms of packs of cigarettes, as American cigarettes were the most widely accepted currency at the time. The book includes vivid word pictures of the lives of ordinary civilians in the aftermath of the war, with rationing and shortages leading many to trade on the black market to eat well or just to survive.

The book ends with Sandulescu describing his clearance to emigrate and his boarding a ship to Canada. In an epilogue, the author describes returning to Germany in 1954 as a US citizen and soldier. Obtaining leave from his unit, he travels to the small village where he had buried, six years earlier in a heavily wooded area, fourteen golden goblets looted from a Bavarian castle. When he reaches the place, he finds an apartment building on the spot. Not willing to risk calling attention to his involvement in the six-year-old theft, Sandulescu inquires only as to how long the building had been standing. He learns from a passerby that the apartment building had been built three years before. Fearing to ask further questions about any artifacts uncovered during construction, Sandulescu returns to his army unit having never learned the fate of "his" treasure.

== Author ==
Jacques Sandulescu was born Herman Pfaff on February 21, 1928, in Transylvania, and died November 19, 2010, in Chapel Hill, North Carolina. In addition to his autobiographical books, Sandulescu wrote fiction and was a boxer, bar-owner and actor. His acting career began in 1970, with a small role in The Owl and the Pussycat, and continued until 2002 (his last job was on Law & Order: Criminal Intent). He was a personal friend of author Whitley Strieber, and is mentioned in Strieber's book Communion as having been present at some of the events that purportedly occurred at that time.

== See also ==
- Aftermath of World War II in Europe
- Post-war German Flight and expulsions from Eastern Europe
- Berlin Blockade
