= Bridget Jones 2 =

Bridget Jones 2 may refer to:

- Bridget Jones: The Edge of Reason (novel), a 1999 novel that is a sequel to the 1996 novel Bridget Jones's Diary
- Bridget Jones: The Edge of Reason, a 2004 film based on the 1999 sequel novel and a sequel to the 2001 film that was based on the 1996 novel
- Bridget Jones: The Edge of Reason (soundtrack), a soundtrack album for the 2004 film
- Bridget Jones's Diary 2: More Music from the Motion Picture and Other V.G. Songs, a supplementary soundtrack album of the 2001 film Bridget Jones's Diary (which was based on the 1996 novel)
