= Bridget Jones's Diary =

2001 film by Sharon Maguire

- Theatrical release poster
- Directed by: Sharon Maguire
- Screenplay by: Helen Fielding; Andrew Davies; Richard Curtis
- Based on: Bridget Jones's Diary; 1996 novel by Helen Fielding
- Produced by: Tim Bevan; Eric Fellner; Jonathan Cavendish
- Starring: Renée Zellweger; Colin Firth; Hugh Grant; Jim Broadbent; Gemma Jones
- Cinematography: Stuart Dryburgh
- Edited by: Martin Walsh
- Music by: Patrick Doyle
- Production companies: Universal Pictures; StudioCanal; Working Title Films; Little Bird
- Distributed by: Miramax Films (United States); Mars Distribution (France); Universal Pictures (through United International Pictures, international)
- Release dates: 10 March 2001 (Empire); 13 April 2001 (United Kingdom and United States); 10 October 2001 (France)
- Running time: 97 minutes
- Countries: France; Ireland; United Kingdom; United States
- Language: English
- Budget: $25 million
- Box office: $282 million

Bridget Jones's Diary is a 2001 romantic comedy film directed by Sharon Maguire from a screenplay by Helen Fielding, Andrew Davies, and Richard Curtis. It is based on the 1996 novel of the same name by Fielding, which was itself a loose adaptation of Jane Austen's Pride and Prejudice. The film stars Renée Zellweger as Bridget Jones, a 32-year-old British single woman who writes a diary, which focuses on the things she wishes to happen in her life. However, her life changes when two men vie for her affection, portrayed by Colin Firth and Hugh Grant. Jim Broadbent and Gemma Jones appear in supporting roles.

Principal photography began in August 2000 and ended in November, and took place largely on location in London and the home counties.

Bridget Jones's Diary premiered at the Empire in London on 10 March 2001 and was released on 13 April simultaneously in the United Kingdom and in the United States. It grossed $282 million worldwide against a production budget of $25 million and received generally positive reviews from critics, who highlighted Zellweger's titular performance, which garnered her a nomination for the Academy Award for Best Actress at the 74th Academy Awards. It has been hailed as part of the English pop culture, with Bridget Jones being cited as a British cultural icon.

The success of the film spawned a Bridget Jones film series, with three sequels being released, Bridget Jones: The Edge of Reason (2004), Bridget Jones's Baby (2016) and Bridget Jones: Mad About the Boy (2025).

== Plot ==
Bridget Jones is 32, single, engagingly imperfect, and worried about her weight. She works as a publicity assistant at a publishing company in London where her main focus is fantasising about her womanising boss, Daniel Cleaver.

At her parents' New Year's party, Bridget is reintroduced to Mark Darcy, a childhood acquaintance and barrister, the son of her parents' friends. Mark finds Bridget foolish and vulgar, while she thinks he is arrogant and rude. Bridget forms the New Year's resolution to turn her life around, by beginning to keep a diary to chronicle her attempts to quit smoking and drinking, lose weight, and find her "Mr. Right".

Bridget and Daniel begin to flirt heavily at work, ahead of an important book launch, at which Bridget's awkward introductory speech unintentionally insults Salman Rushdie and Jeffrey Archer. Adding to her deep embarrassment, Bridget runs into Mark and his sophisticated colleague, Natasha. An amused Daniel rescues Bridget, and the two leave together and start dating. Daniel reveals to Bridget that he and Mark were formerly friends, but their friendship ended when he caught Mark having an affair with his then fiancée.

Bridget and Daniel take a mini-break weekend together, during which they are to attend Bridget's family party, announced as a "Tarts and Vicars" costume party. They stay at a country inn where Mark and a disapproving Natasha, who are also staying, watch Bridget and Daniel enjoy themselves reciting bawdy limericks while rowing in a lake. In a moment of passion that night, Bridget declares her love for Daniel, who is evasive. The next morning, Daniel says he must return to London for work, leaving Bridget to attend the costume party alone, dressed as a Playboy Bunny; to her dismay the party theme was changed last minute to normal dress.

When Bridget returns to London and drops in on Daniel, she discovers his American colleague, Lara, naked in his flat. Heartbroken, she quits her job; although Daniel urges her to reconsider, she rebuffs him in front of coworkers who cheer her retort. She searches for a new job and ultimately lands a role in television, where she becomes locally infamous for comically bungling human interest reports that endear her to her public.

At a friend's dinner party, Bridget again crosses paths with Mark and Natasha. He privately confesses to Bridget that, despite her faults, he likes her "just as she is". Sometime later, he allows Bridget an exclusive TV interview in a landmark legal case which boosts her career and prompts her to see him differently.

Mark comes to Bridget's rescue when she vainly attempts to cook a gourmet birthday party dinner, and the two celebrate with Bridget's friends. A drunken Daniel arrives to reclaim Bridget's attention, which prompts Mark to challenge Daniel to a fight in the street. Mark knocks Daniel to the ground and leaves when Bridget chides his behavior. When Daniel suggests they settle for one another, Bridget rejects him.

Bridget's mother, Pamela, off-handedly reveals that Mark and Daniel's falling-out resulted from Daniel (Mark's best friend since Cambridge University days) having an affair with Mark's now ex-wife, not as Daniel had falsely claimed.

At the Darcys' ruby wedding anniversary, Bridget tells Mark that she also likes him for who he is, echoing his prior declaration. To her dismay, she learns during a toast that he and Natasha have accepted jobs in New York and are widely expected to become engaged. Interrupting the toast, Bridget awkwardly makes her distress over the news obvious. Bridget's friends rally to repair her broken heart with a surprise trip to Paris, but as they are about to leave, Mark appears at Bridget's flat declaring the New York trip off.

Skipping Paris to stay with Mark, Bridget excuses herself to change in her bedroom. While waiting, Mark reads earlier unflattering opinions of him in her diary, left open on the table, and promptly leaves. Realising what has happened, Bridget runs after him in the snow. Finding him outside a nearby shop, Bridget apologises for what she wrote and says "it's only a diary". Mark reveals he only left to buy her a new one, which he gives her, "to make a fresh start", and they kiss.

== Cast ==
- Renée Zellweger as Bridget Jones
- Colin Firth as Mark Darcy
- Hugh Grant as Daniel Cleaver
- Jim Broadbent as Colin Jones
- Gemma Jones as Pamela Jones
- Celia Imrie as Una Alconbury
- James Faulkner as 'Uncle' Geoffrey
- Charmian May as Geraldine Darcy
- Paul Brooke as Kenneth Fitzherbert
- Felicity Montagu as Perpetua
- Shirley Henderson as Jude
- Sally Phillips as Sharon "Shazza"
- James Callis as Tom
- Embeth Davidtz as Natasha Glenville
- Patrick Barlow as Julian
- Lisa Barbuscia as Lara
- Neil Pearson as Richard Finch
- Dolly Wells as Woney
- Donald Douglas as Admiral Mark Darcy, Snr.

Salman Rushdie, Julian Barnes, Jeffrey Archer and Honor Blackman have cameos in the film.

Andrew Davies, screenwriter of the 1995 television adaptation of Pride and Prejudice, collaborated on the screenplays for the 2001 and 2004 Bridget Jones films and Crispin Bonham-Carter, who played Mr. Bingley in that adaptation, appeared in a minor role. The self-referential in-joke between the projects convinced Colin Firth to accept the role of Mark Darcy, as it gave him an opportunity to ridicule and liberate himself from his Pride and Prejudice character.

== Production ==
Working Title Films acquired the film rights of the novel in 1997 before it became a best-seller.

=== Casting ===
Actresses who were considered for the role of Bridget Jones were Helena Bonham Carter, Cate Blanchett, Emily Watson, Rachel Weisz (who was considered too beautiful for the role), and Cameron Diaz. Toni Collette declined the role because she was on Broadway starring in The Wild Party at the time. Kate Winslet was also considered, but, at 24, the producers decided she was too young.

Zellweger's casting in late May 2000 concluded a two-year search. Producer Eric Fellner explained that she "brings enormous character and conviction to the part". Director Sharon Maguire said of Zellweger, "I saw in Renee a gift few people have, that she was able to straddle comedy and emotion." Zellweger worked on her accent with Barbara Berkery, who had helped Gwyneth Paltrow for Shakespeare in Love. She also gained 20 pounds (9 kg) for the part. To prepare for the role, Zellweger worked at the producers' request at London book publishers Picador as a trainee in the publicity department. Before the film was released, a considerable amount of controversy surrounded the casting of the American Zellweger as what some saw as a quintessentially British heroine. However, her performance, including her south-eastern English accent, is widely considered to be of a high standard.

In July 2000, Colin Firth and Hugh Grant were cast as the male leads. The director of the film, Maguire, one of Fielding's friends, was reportedly the base for the character "Shazzer" (English slang for Sharon), as mentioned in the behind the scenes commentary on the DVD. In the film, Shazzer is played by Sally Phillips.

=== Filming ===
Principal photography began on 16 May 2000 and concluded on 8 August 2000. The crew spent six weeks shooting in and around London. Locations used included Shad Thames where Bridget and Daniel have their first date, the Royal Courts of Justice, St Pancras railway station and Tower Bridge. Scenes were filmed at Stoke Park in Buckinghamshire where Bridget and Daniel ventured to for their mini-break. Wrotham Park in Hertfordshire served as the Darcys' home. Stansted Airport doubled as JFK Airport in New York City, while Syon House in Brentford featured as the venue for the anniversary party. The crew filmed for four days at Snowshill in Gloucestershire which featured as the home of Bridget Jones's family. After six weeks of shooting on location, the crew moved to Shepperton Studios in Surrey.

== Soundtrack ==
The film's soundtrack was composed by Patrick Doyle. The soundtrack for Bridget Jones's Diary was produced by Nick Angel and Kathy Nelson and features two previously unreleased songs that became hit singles, including "Out of Reach" by Gabrielle and "It's Raining Men" by Geri Halliwell, the latter of which became Halliwell's fourth consecutive number-one hit single on the UK Singles Chart. Following the success of the first soundtrack, a second soundtrack was released, titled Bridget Jones's Diary 2: More Music from the Motion Picture and Other V.G. Songs.

== Reception ==
=== Box office ===
Bridget Jones's Diary grossed $71.5 million in the United States and Canada, and $210.5 million in other territories, for a worldwide total of $282 million, against a production budget of $25 million. The film made $10.7 million in its opening weekend, finishing third. Dropping just 5.7% in its second weekend, the film made $10.2 million and finished first the following weekend.

=== Critical response ===
On the review aggregator website Rotten Tomatoes, the film holds an approval rating of 79% based on 164 reviews, with an average rating of 6.9/10. The website's critics consensus reads, "Though there was controversy over the choice of casting, Zellweger's Bridget Jones is a sympathetic, likable, funny character, giving this romantic comedy a lot of charm." Metacritic assigned the film a weighted average score of 66 out of 100 based on 33 critics, indicating "generally favorable" reviews. Audiences polled by CinemaScore gave the film an average grade of "B+" on an A+ to F scale.

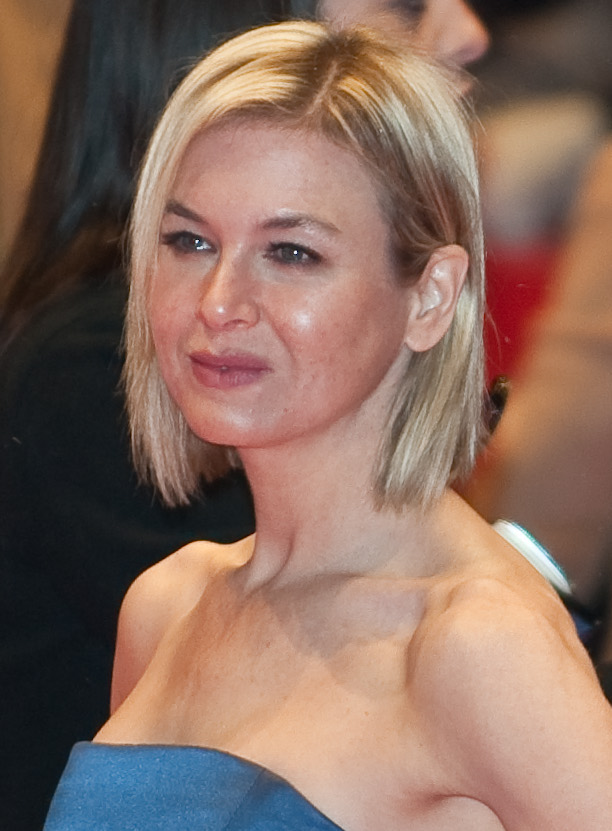
Zellweger's portrayal of Bridget Jones earned universal acclaim.

Much acclaim was given to Zellweger's performance, with Paul Clinton of CNN writing that Zellweger "nails Jones's London accent while simultaneously delivering a performance bursting with power and brimming with heartfelt emotion". Mark Adams of The Hollywood Reporter praised Zellweger's knack for physical comedy, and The Washington Post's Stephen Hunter said the film lets her "show both her frantic awkwardness and her tender decency". The New York Times's Stephen Holden called the film "a delicious piece of candy whose amusing package is scrawled with bons mots distantly inspired by Jane Austen", and added "Ms. Zellweger accomplishes the small miracle of making Bridget both entirely endearing and utterly real. It is a performance so airy you barely sense the work that must have gone into it." The Chicago Sun-Times' Roger Ebert gave the film three-and-a-half out of four stars, describing it as "made against all odds into a funny and charming movie that understands the charm of the original, and preserves it". The Guardian's Peter Bradshaw commended Maguire for directing with "chutzpah and style".

Lisa Schwarzbaum of Entertainment Weekly wrote, "Hugh Grant is charming too, luxuriating in naughtiness, taking a holiday from his usual floppy, velvet romantic image as Bridget's caddish boss, Daniel Cleaver." Hunter praised Firth, writing "He's the complete Darcy, and he never wavers. There's no sentimentality, no flirtation with the audience, no final moment of pandering to the niceness gods; he's a cold geek all the way through."

Some critics said that in the book's adaptation to the screen, it loses "much of Fielding's irony, nuance and cynicism". Clinton wrote, "While the writers have captured Fielding's sparkling rhythm with words, they've created a bit of havoc with the plotline." Though she gave a positive review, Schwarzbaum opined, "The mess, though, where's the mess? The hysteria, the middle of the night jitters of loneliness? The mess of Bridget's life [in the book] has been tidied, neatened into little piles of mirth and gaiety...The movie never shows us anything about Bridget that's remotely in need of psychological or physical fixing." Felicia Feaster of Creative Loafing expressed that "Bridget's 'why can't I find a husband?' lament" becomes tiresome and "caters to women's lowest expectations and suggests that even the 'modern' 'liberated' woman is a Doris Day closet-case." In contrast, Stephanie Zacharek of Salon.com said the film is an improvement on the novel.

In a 2021 retrospective piece for the New Statesman, Johanna Thomas-Corr discussed the more outdated aspects of the film, but said that the central performances are what makes the movie timeless.

In 2025, it was one of the films voted for the "Readers' Choice" edition of The New York Times' list of "The 100 Best Movies of the 21st Century," finishing at number 303.

== Accolades ==
Bridget Jones's Diary was nominated for the BAFTA Award for Best British Film, the Golden Globe Award for Best Motion Picture – Musical or Comedy, and the Satellite Award for Best Film – Musical or Comedy, while Richard Curtis, Andrew Davies, and Helen Fielding were nominated for the BAFTA Award for Best Adapted Screenplay. In 2008, the American Film Institute included the film in its AFI's 10 Top 10 "Nominated Romantic Comedy" listing.

Renée Zellweger's performance was nominated for an Academy Award, the BAFTA Award, the Broadcast Film Critics Association Award, the Empire Award, the Golden Globe Award, the Screen Actors Guild Award, and the Dallas–Fort Worth Film Critics Association Award. Colin Firth was nominated for the BAFTA Award for Best Actor in a Supporting Role and the Satellite Award for Best Actor – Motion Picture Musical or Comedy, while Hugh Grant won the Evening Standard British Film Awards' Peter Sellers Award for Comedy and was nominated for the Satellite Award for Best Supporting Actor – Motion Picture Musical or Comedy, and the European Film Award – Jameson People's Choice Award – Best Actor.

Accolades received by Bridget Jones's Diary
Award	Date of ceremony	Category	Recipient(s)	Result	Ref.
Academy Awards	24 March 2002	Best Actress	Renée Zellweger	Nominated	
British Academy Film Awards	24 February 2002	Best Actress in a Leading Role	Renée Zellweger	Nominated	
British Academy Film Awards	24 February 2002	Best Actor in a Supporting Role	Colin Firth	Nominated	
British Academy Film Awards	24 February 2002	Best Adapted Screenplay	Helen Fielding, Andrew Davies and Richard Curtis	Nominated	
British Academy Film Awards	24 February 2002	Outstanding British Film	Tim Bevan, Eric Fellner and Jonathan Cavendish	Nominated	
Critics' Choice Movie Awards	11 January 2002	Best Actress	Renée Zellweger	Nominated	
Dallas–Fort Worth Film Critics Association Awards	3 January 2002	Best Actress	Renée Zellweger	Nominated	
Empire Awards	5 February 2002	Best Actress	Renée Zellweger	Nominated	
European Film Awards	1 December 2001	Best Film	Tim Bevan, Eric Fellner and Jonathan Cavendish	Nominated	
European Film Awards	1 December 2001	Jameson People's Choice Award for Best Actor	Colin Firth	Won	
Evening Standard British Film Awards	3 February 2002	Best Screenplay	Helen Fielding, Andrew Davies and Richard Curtis	Won	
Evening Standard British Film Awards	3 February 2002	Peter Sellers Award for Comedy	Hugh Grant	Won	
Golden Globe Awards	20 January 2002	Best Motion Picture – Musical or Comedy	Bridget Jones's Diary	Nominated	
Golden Globe Awards	20 January 2002	Best Actress – Motion Picture Comedy or Musical	Renée Zellweger	Nominated	
Goya Awards	2 February 2002	Best European Film	Bridget Jones's Diary	Nominated	
Grammy Awards	27 February 2002	Best Compilation Soundtrack for Visual Media	Nick Angel and Kathy Nelson	Nominated	
London Film Critics Circle Awards	13 February 2002	British Screenwriter of the Year	Helen Fielding, Andrew Davies and Richard Curtis	Won	
Satellite Awards	19 January 2002	Best Picture: Musical or Comedy	Bridget Jones's Diary	Nominated	
Satellite Awards	19 January 2002	Best Actress: Musical or Comedy	Renée Zellweger	Nominated	
Satellite Awards	19 January 2002	Best Actor: Musical or Comedy	Colin Firth	Nominated	
Satellite Awards	19 January 2002	Best Supporting Actor: Musical or Comedy	Hugh Grant	Nominated	
Screen Actors Guild Awards	10 March 2002	Outstanding Performance by a Female Actor in a Leading Role	Renée Zellweger	Nominated	
Writers Guild of America Awards	16 January 2002	Best Adapted Screenplay	Helen Fielding, Andrew Davies and Richard Curtis	Nominated	

== Home media ==
The film was released on VHS and DVD in the United States on 9 October 2001 by Miramax Home Entertainment. It was later released on Blu-ray on 19 July 2011 by Lionsgate Home Entertainment.

== Musical adaptation ==
In 2009, it was reported the film version was being adapted into a musical, set to be performed in London's West End, although no premiere date was set. British musician Lily Allen wrote the score and lyrics, and Stephen Daldry, best known for his Tony award-winning work on the West End and Broadway productions of Billy Elliot, was in talks to direct, joined by his co-worker Peter Darling, who was said to serve as choreographer. Workshops for the show began with television actress and star of Legally Blonde, Sheridan Smith, in the title role. To date, a full production of the musical has not been mounted.

== See also ==
- Bridget Jones: The Edge of Reason, the movie sequel
- ’’Bridget Jones: The Edge of Reason (novel)’m, the sequel to the novel
- ’’Bridget Jones: Mad about the Boy (novel)’’, the third novel in the series.
- My Lovely Sam Soon, a Korean series with some thematic and narrative similarities
