= Sharon Maguire =

British television and film director

Sharon Maguire (born 17 August 1960) is an English film and television director best known for directing the romantic comedy film Bridget Jones's Diary (2001). The film was based on the book of the same name by her close friend, Helen Fielding, and one of the main characters – "Shazza" – is allegedly based on Maguire.

== Early life ==
Born in Coventry to Irish Catholic parents, Maguire studied English and drama at the University of Wales Aberystwyth. After leaving university she worked as a copywriter in publishing before doing a postgraduate degree in journalism at City University, London.

== Career ==
She began a career in television, working as a researcher for The Media Show (C4) and then as a producer/director at the BBC's The Late Show. She then went on to direct several documentaries for BBC's Omnibus and Bookmark, before leaving the corporation to direct commercials. Bridget Jones's Diary marked Maguire's feature directorial debut.

In 2001, she directed Bridget Jones's Diary from a screenplay by Helen Fielding, Andrew Davies and Richard Curtis which was praised by critics. The film stars Renée Zellweger as Bridget Jones, with Colin Firth and Hugh Grant.

In 2016, she co-founded the television production company 7 Stories, which creates scripted drama for TV.

Also in 2016, she directed Bridget Jones's Baby from a screenplay by Helen Fielding, Dan Mazer and Emma Thompson, based on a story by Fielding. It is the sequel to Bridget Jones: The Edge of Reason (2004) and the third installment in the Bridget Jones film series. The film stars Renée Zellweger as Bridget Jones, Colin Firth and Patrick Dempsey.

== Personal life ==
She has three children with her partner, director Anand Tucker.

== Filmography ==
TV documentary works

Year	Title	Director	Producer	Writer	Notes
1990	The Media Show	Yes	Yes	No	Directed 3 episodes
1991	Without Walls	Yes	No	No	Episode "The Thing is... Babies"
1993	The Late Show	Yes	Yes	No	Directed 5 episodes
1994	Yo Picasso	Yes	Yes	Yes	TV movie
1995-1996	Bookmark	Yes	Yes	No	3 episodes
1997	Omnibus	Yes	Yes	No	Episode "Dame Henrietta's Dream"

Feature film

- Bridget Jones's Diary (2001)
- Incendiary (2008) (Also writer)
- Bridget Jones's Baby (2016)
- Godmothered (2020)

Ref.:

TV movie

Year	Title	Note
2013	Call Me Crazy: A Five Film	Segment "Allison"
