= Bridget Jones's Diary (musical) =

- The Musical
- Music: Lily Allen; Greg Kurstin; Karen Poole
- Lyrics: Lily Allen; Greg Kurstin; Karen Poole
- Book: Helen Fielding
- Basis: Bridget Jones's Diary by Helen Fielding

Bridget Jones's Diary is a musical with music and lyrics by Lily Allen, Greg Kurstin, and Karen Poole. The play is based on the 1996 book by Helen Fielding and the 2001 film of the same name. The show was in development around 2009–2010 and has had several workshop readings, but no full performances.

== Development ==
In early 2009, a partial production was first performed to a very small audience. As there was no music written for the show at the time, the performance consisted of only dialogue and a few spoken lyrics. The production featured a limited cast including Harry Enfield and British comedian Victoria Wood, each playing several parts. Although the script, penned by author of the original books, Helen Fielding, was considered very "raw" and incomplete in some places, the performance was praised by its audience. Representatives for the show's production company, Working Title, confirmed that Fielding had officially signed contracts releasing the rights for a musical production to go ahead.

In early 2010, it was confirmed that Tony award-winning English theatre and film director and producer Stephen Daldry, and Peter Darling would serve as director and choreographer, respectively. The pair had previously worked together on the successful West End and Broadway productions of Billy Elliot. Lily Allen and Greg Kurstin then wrote the music and lyrics for the show. In April 2014, Allen cast doubt on whether the musical would be performed in an interview with Popjustice, saying "It's finished and it's brilliant. But I don't know if it will ever see the light of day."

In February 2024, Allen commented on Twitter that the songs written for the musical were "so good", adding "I have to believe that it will happen one day."

== Confirmed songs ==
- 'If I Could Save Her From Her Sadness' (Lily Allen, Greg Kurstin)
- 'Wanker!' (Allen, Kurstin, Poole)
- 'Happy' (Allen, Kurstin, Poole)
- 'Falling Over Myself' (Allen, Kurstin, Poole)
- 'YUMMY!' (Allen, Kurstin, Poole)

== Production history ==
After a long period of development on the script and music, a workshop production of the show was held in London in early 2010 featuring Sheridan Smith as Bridget Jones, Bertie Carvel as Mark Darcy and Julian Ovenden as Daniel Cleaver. Smith appeared on BBC One's The One Show on 3 August 2010 and stated that if a West End theatre production of the show were to go ahead, she would accept the title role.
