= The Edge of Reason =

The Edge of Reason may refer to:

- Bridget Jones: The Edge of Reason (novel), a 1999 novel by Helen Fielding
- Bridget Jones: The Edge of Reason, a 2004 romantic comedy film directed by Beeban Kidron
- The Edge of Reason, a 2008 novel by science fiction writer Melinda M. Snodgrass
