= Mad About the Boy =

Mad About the Boy may refer to:

- Mad About the Boy (song), a song by Noel Coward
- Mad About the Boy: The Noel Coward Story, a 2023 documentary about Noel Coward
- Bridget Jones: Mad about the Boy (novel), a novel by Helen Fielding
  - Bridget Jones: Mad About the Boy, a 2025 film based on the novel
