= Bridget Jones (film series) =

Films about rom-com heroine Bridget Jones

- Official film series logo
- Based on: Bridget Jones by Helen Fielding
- Starring: Renée Zellweger; Colin Firth; Hugh Grant; Patrick Dempsey; Chiwetel Ejiofor; Leo Woodall
- Distributed by: Miramax Films (1: domestic); StudioCanal (1-4: France); Universal Pictures (1: international; 2–4: worldwide)
- Release dates: 13 April 2001 (1); 12 November 2004 (2); 16 September 2016 (3); 13 February 2025 (4)
- Running time: 427 minutes
- Language: English
- Budget: $150 million (4 films)
- Box office: $897 million (4 films)

The Bridget Jones film series consists of romantic comedy films based on the book series of the same name by Helen Fielding. Starring Renée Zellweger in the title role, with an ensemble supporting cast, the films follow the life events of primary characters Bridget Jones, Mark Darcy, and Daniel Cleaver and explore their respective relationships.

The first film was a success at the box office and was met with praise from critics. The second film received a mixed-negative reception, but was commercially successful. The third film was met with both critical and commercial success. A fourth film was theatrically released in February 2025 in most markets but to Peacock in the United States. It received largely positive reviews and was also a commercial success.

== Films ==
| Film | Release date | Director | Screenwriters | Producers |
|---|---|---|---|---|
| Bridget Jones's Diary | April 13, 2001 | Sharon Maguire | Andrew Davies, Richard Curtis & Helen Fielding | Tim Bevan, Eric Fellner & Jonathan Cavendish |
| Bridget Jones: The Edge of Reason | November 12, 2004 | Beeban Kidron | Adam Brooks, Andrew Davies, Richard Curtis & Helen Fielding | Tim Bevan, Eric Fellner & Jonathan Cavendish |
| Bridget Jones's Baby | September 16, 2016 | Sharon Maguire | Dan Mazer, Emma Thompson & Helen Fielding | Tim Bevan, Eric Fellner & Debra Hayward |
| Bridget Jones: Mad About the Boy | February 13, 2025 | Michael Morris | Dan Mazer, Abi Morgan & Helen Fielding | Tim Bevan, Jo Wallett & Eric Fellner |

=== Bridget Jones's Diary (2001) ===
Bridget Jones is a single thirty-something English woman trying to keep her love life in order while working as a publisher's assistant. She attends a New Year's Day party at her parents' house, where they try to set her up with their neighbour's son, Mark Darcy, whom she instantly dislikes. Bridget starts flirting with her boss, Daniel Cleaver, and they start dating. Daniel tells her that he and Mark attended university together and that Mark had an affair with his fiancée, which makes Bridget think worse of Mark. Bridget finds that Daniel has cheated on her, so she quits her publishing job and goes to work in television. At a dinner party, she runs into Mark who tells her he likes her "just the way she is". Mark and Daniel fight over Bridget, and she ultimately decides she wants to be with Mark.

=== Bridget Jones: The Edge of Reason (2004) ===
Bridget is currently living a happy life with her human rights lawyer boyfriend Mark Darcy, but becomes jealous of Mark's new young intern and is uncomfortable with some of Mark's conservative views, and they break up. Bridget travels to Thailand with Daniel Cleaver to film a television programme. While there, she unknowingly puts drugs in her suitcase, and ends up in a Thai prison. Mark organises her release, but does not want to take the credit as he thinks she is back with Daniel. Bridget discovers the truth and tells Mark of her feelings for him.

=== Bridget Jones's Baby (2016) ===
Bridget Jones is struggling with her current state of life, including her break up with her love Mark Darcy. She pushes forward and works hard to find fulfilment in her life, which seems to do wonders, until she meets a dashing and handsome American named Jack Qwant. Things from then on go great, until she discovers that she is pregnant but the biggest twist of all, she does not know if Mark or Jack is the father of her child.

=== Bridget Jones: Mad About the Boy (2025) ===
Bridget Jones, now a widowed single mother, navigates the challenges of parenthood, work, and modern dating with the support of her friends, family, and former partner, Daniel Cleaver. As she re-enters the dating world, she finds herself pursued by a younger man while also forming an unexpected connection with her son's science teacher.

== Principal cast and characters ==
List indicators

This section includes characters who will appear or have appeared in notable roles.

- An empty grey cell indicates the character was not in the film, or that the character's official presence has not yet been confirmed.
- ^{A} indicates an appearance through archival footage or audio.
- ^{P} indicates an appearance in onscreen photographs.

| Characters | Films | | | |
| Characters | Bridget Jones's Diary | Bridget Jones: The Edge of Reason | Bridget Jones's Baby | Bridget Jones: Mad About the Boy |
| Characters | 2001 | 2004 | 2016 | 2025 |
|---|---|---|---|---|
| Bridget Jones | Renée Zellweger | Renée Zellweger | Renée Zellweger | Renée Zellweger |
| Mark Darcy | Colin Firth | Colin Firth | Colin Firth | Colin Firth |
| Daniel Cleaver | Hugh Grant | Hugh Grant | Hugh Grant^{P} | Hugh Grant |
| Colin Jones | Jim Broadbent | Jim Broadbent | Jim Broadbent | Jim Broadbent |
| Pamela Jones | Gemma Jones | Gemma Jones | Gemma Jones | Gemma Jones |
| Jude | Shirley Henderson | Shirley Henderson | Shirley Henderson | Shirley Henderson |
| Tom | James Callis | James Callis | James Callis | James Callis |
| Sharon | Sally Phillips | Sally Phillips | Sally Phillips | Sally Phillips |
| Richard Fink | Neil Pearson | Neil Pearson | Neil Pearson | Neil Pearson |
| Una Alconbury | Celia Imrie | Celia Imrie | Celia Imrie | Celia Imrie |
| Uncle Geoffrey | James Faulkner | James Faulkner | James Faulkner | |
| Admiral Darcy | Donald Douglas | Donald Douglas | Donald Douglas | |
| Mrs. Darcy | Charmian May | Shirley Dixon (Note: Non-speaking role.) | Shirley Dixon | |
| Lara | Lisa Barbuscia | | | |
| Mr. Fitzherbert | Paul Brooke | | | |
| Natasha Glenville | Embeth Davidtz | | | |
| Julian | Patrick Barlow | | | |
| Perpetua | Felicity Montagu | | | |
| Magda | Claire Skinner | Jessica Hynes | Jessica Hynes | Claire Skinner |
| Rebecca Gillies | | Jacinda Barrett | | |
| Jed | | Paul Nicholls | | |
| Jack Qwant | | | Patrick Dempsey | |
| William "Billy" Darcy | | | Uncredited | Casper Knopf |
| Miranda | | | Sarah Solemani | Sarah Solemani |
| Dr. Rawling | | | Emma Thompson | Emma Thompson |
| Cathy | | | Joanna Scanlan | Joanna Scanlan |
| Mabel Darcy | | | | Mila Jankovic |
| Scott Walliker | | | | Chiwetel Ejiofor |
| Roxster McDuff | | | | Leo Woodall |
| Rebecca | | | | Isla Fisher |
| Chloe | | | | Nico Parker |
| Nicolette | | | | Leila Farzad |

== Additional crew and production details ==
| Film | Crew/Detail | | | | | |
| Film | Composer | Cinematographer | Editor | Production companies | Distributing company | Running time |
|---|---|---|---|---|---|---|
| Bridget Jones's Diary | Patrick Doyle | Stuart Dryburgh | Martin Walsh | Universal Pictures, Little Bird Films, StudioCanal, Working Title Films | United International Pictures; Miramax Films | 97 minutes |
| Bridget Jones: The Edge of Reason | Harry Gregson-Williams | Adrian Biddle | Greg Hayden | Miramax Films, Little Bird Films, StudioCanal, Working Title Films | Universal Pictures | 108 minutes |
| Bridget Jones's Baby | Craig Armstrong | Andrew Dunn | Melanie Ann Oliver | Miramax, Little Bird Films, StudioCanal, Perfect World Pictures, Working Title Films | Universal Pictures | 123 minutes |
| Bridget Jones: Mad About the Boy | Dustin O'Halloran | Suzie Lavelle | Mark Day | Working Title Films; Miramax; StudioCanal | Universal Pictures | 125 minutes |

== Reception ==
=== Box office performance ===
| Film | Box office gross | | | Box office ranking | | Budget | Ref. |
| Film | North America | Other territories | Worldwide | All time North America | All time worldwide | Budget | Ref. |
|---|---|---|---|---|---|---|---|
| Bridget Jones's Diary | $71,543,427 | $210,386,368 | $281,929,795 | #996 | #421 | $25 million | |
| Bridget Jones: The Edge of Reason | $40,226,215 | $222,294,509 | $262,520,724 | #1,895 | #458 | $40 million | |
| Bridget Jones's Baby | $24,252,420 | $187,700,000 | $211,952,420 | #2,893 | #642 | $35 million | |
| Bridget Jones: Mad About the Boy | | $140,430,786 | $140,430,786 | | | $50 million | |
| Totals | $136,022,062 | $760,811,663 | $896,833,725 | | | $150 million | |

=== Critical and public response ===
| Film | Rotten Tomatoes | Metacritic | CinemaScore |
|---|---|---|---|
| Bridget Jones's Diary | 79% (164 reviews) | 66 (33 reviews) | B+ |
| Bridget Jones: The Edge of Reason | 27% (151 reviews) | 44 (37 reviews) | B+ |
| Bridget Jones's Baby | 78% (210 reviews) | 59 (42 reviews) | B+ |
| Bridget Jones: Mad About the Boy | 89% (115 reviews) | 73 (27 reviews) | TBA |

== Accolades ==
=== Bridget Jones's Diary ===
Renée Zellweger was nominated for the Academy Award for Best Actress, the BAFTA Award for Best Actress in a Leading Role, the Broadcast Film Critics Association Award for Best Actress, the Empire Award for Best Actress, the Golden Globe Award for Best Actress – Motion Picture Musical or Comedy, the MTV Movie Award for Best Kiss (shared with Colin Firth), the Satellite Award for Best Actress – Motion Picture Musical or Comedy, the Screen Actors Guild Award for Outstanding Performance by a Female Actor in a Leading Role, the Teen Choice Award for Choice Chemistry (shared with Hugh Grant), the Teen Choice Award for Choice Liplock (shared with Grant), and the Dallas–Fort Worth Film Critics Association Award for Best Actress.

Firth won the European Film Awards Audience Award for Best Actor and the European Film Award – Jameson People's Choice Award – Best Actor and was nominated for the BAFTA Award for Best Actor in a Supporting Role and the Satellite Award for Best Actor – Motion Picture Musical or Comedy. Grant won the Evening Standard British Film Awards' Peter Sellers Award for Comedy and was nominated for the Empire Award for Best British Actor, the Satellite Award for Best Supporting Actor – Motion Picture Musical or Comedy, and the European Film Award – Jameson People's Choice Award – Best Actor. Richard Curtis, Andrew Davies, and Helen Fielding were nominated for the BAFTA Award for Best Adapted Screenplay. The film was nominated for the BAFTA Award for Best British Film, the Golden Globe Award for Best Motion Picture – Musical or Comedy, and the Satellite Award for Best Film – Musical or Comedy.

=== Bridget Jones: The Edge of Reason ===
The film was voted Evening Standard Readers' Film of 2004. It was on the shortlist for the Orange Film of the Year Award at the 2005 BAFTAs. For her performance as Bridget Jones, Zellweger gained another Golden Globe Award nomination and won the People's Choice Awards for Favorite Leading Lady in 2005.

=== Bridget Jones's Baby ===
The film was nominated at the 2017 Diversity in Media Awards for Movie of the Year and won the ASPAC Award.

== Home media ==
The first film on VHS was released in 2001 containing over 35 minutes of bonus material which includes: Deleted Scenes, Exclusive Interviews, Bridget's Guide to "Getting It Right". There was also a VHS of "The Making of Bridget Jones". In 2001, the film was released on DVD containing brand new bonus material and in 2011 a Blu-ray version of the film was released. A Collective Edition of the film was released in 2004 with new bonus material including; The Bridget Phenomenon, The Young And The Mateless, Portrait Of The Makeup Artist, Domestic and International TV Spots, Bridget Jones: The Edge Of Reason Theatrical Trailer, Bridget Jones's Diary Reviews and A Guide to Bridget Britishism.

The second film was released on DVD in 2004 with a variety of bonus features.
