= Bridget Jones's Baby: The Diaries =

2016 book

- Author: Helen Fielding
- Language: English
- Genre: Comedy novel, chick lit
- Publication date: 2016 novel
- Publication place: United Kingdom
- Media type: Print (hardback & paperback)

Bridget Jones's Baby: The Diaries is a 2016 novel by Helen Fielding.

== Plot ==
Bridget Jones becomes pregnant and goes on her pregnancy journey, unsure of who the father really is.

== Critical reception ==
The Guardian compared the novel to the film on which it is based, Bridget Jones's Baby, saying "Especially since the film, which was irresistible – and believe me, I tried – I can’t shake a residual fondness for Bridget; but this literary version was phoned in, a hazy half-world described for an unloved correspondent on the way to some more interesting story."

Evening Standard, "I was expecting a lame retread of the film but I couldn’t have been more wrong, I realised, as I turned the pages, crying with laughter. Bridget Jones is as relevant and funny today as she has always been."

The New York Times, "The newest of the Bridget Jones chronicles is, like all of Helen Fielding's novels, well paced and well crafted, as symmetrical and solidly constructed as an Oreo, after all.
