= Bridget Jones: Mad About the Boy (novel) =

2013 novel by Helen Fielding

- Author: Helen Fielding
- Language: English
- Genre: Comedy novel, chick lit
- Publisher: Jonathan Cape (UK), Knopf (US)
- Publication date: 2013 novel
- Publication place: United Kingdom
- Media type: Print (hardback & paperback)
- ISBN: 9780099584438
- Preceded by: Bridget Jones: The Edge of Reason
- Followed by: Bridget Jones's Baby: The Diaries

Bridget Jones: Mad About the Boy is a 2013 novel by Helen Fielding. It is her third novel chronicling the life of "hapless rom-com heroine" Bridget Jones, who is now a widow romancing a much younger man. The novel received mixed reviews. A film based on the novel was released in February 2025.

== Plot ==
Set 20 years after Fielding's first novel, Bridget Jones's Diary, 51-year-old Bridget is again looking for love and flirts on Tinder with men 20 years her junior. It is revealed that Bridget married the man of her dreams, Mark Darcy, had two children, Mabel and Billy, and joined the ranks of the 'smug marrieds'. However, Mark Darcy died, so Bridget is a widow. "Widowhood, Bridget's friend tells her, is 'better than being divorced. It's so romantic and original'."

Mad About the Boy begins four years after Mark's death, as Bridget emerges from the shock of grief to start dating again. Along with obsessively logging her weight and alcohol units, Bridget now also logs her Nicorette gum (she no longer smokes), embarrassing texts, tweets and Botox.

The novel opens with Bridget excited about dating a younger man, 29-year-old 'toyboy' Roxster, and writing a screenplay. She also has a flirtation with a married teacher, Mr. Wallaker.

== Publication ==
The novel was published in Britain by Jonathan Cape, and in the United States by Knopf, in October 2013.

When asked about the 14-year gap since the last Bridget Jones novel, Fielding told the Independent: "I sort of lost my voice with Bridget for a long time after the unexpected success when it first came out. It was very easy to write and be honest, then I got all self-conscious." She told Radio 4's Woman's Hour: "I found... I had new stuff I wanted to say. Things that didn't exist when I last wrote, like emails and texting. The way life is lived through Twitter."

The jacket design for the novel was voted for by more than 117,000 fans on Facebook.

Fielding has said the novel's title was inspired by singer Dinah Washington's version of the Noël Coward song "Mad About the Boy".

== Reaction ==
The novel reveals that Mark Darcy has been killed by a landmine in Sudan while negotiating the release of aid workers. His death took many fans by surprise. Journalist and television presenter Anne Robinson tweeted: "Mark Darcy is dead. Bridget Jones is a widow!! This is all too much for a lazy Sunday morning." Another fan tweeted "I really hope this isn't true".

Meg Wolitzer of National Public Radio said the outcry over Mark Darcy's death was not caused by sadness "so much as by the sense readers had that killing him was a cheat, a sacrilege, somehow morally wrong". Glamour magazine said of the decision to kill off Mark Darcy: "the world weeps".

== Critical reception ==
The novel received mixed reviews, but topped sales charts on its publication, selling 46,000 copies in a single day.

Stephanie Merritt, writing for The Guardian, called Bridget Jones "the first truly modern comic heroine". Now, "older, sadder but none the wiser, Bridget Jones remains the quintessential comic heroine on her third outing." It concluded that Bridget Jones is supposed to be ridiculous and often infuriating. "But she is also very human, with all her insecurities, and if you don't shed a few tears in the course of this book, you must have a heart of ice."

Also writing in the Guardian, Suzanne Moore described Bridget Jones as "vapid, consumerist and self-obsessed as ever" and said "I don't buy this anti-feminist fiction."

Ann Friedman of The Los Angeles Times called Bridget Jones a "hapless rom-com heroine" and said "the introduction of genuine life sorrow doesn't just mar the lightness of the original (which was one of the first books to be dubbed "chick lit")... but it also makes it harder for many women to relate — widowhood being far less common among 50-year-olds than divorce."

In her NPR review, Wolitzer said Bridget Jones had lost much of her charm. "In the first two books, the detailed accounts of drinking, snogging, shagging and so forth were irresistible and seemed effortless. Bridget was messy, adorable and real. Now she's a strange hybrid — messy, yes, but sometimes embarrassing and not authentic."

== Film adaptation ==
Bridget Jones: Mad About the Boy is a romantic comedy film directed by Michael Morris from a screenplay by Helen Fielding, Dan Mazer and Abi Morgan. The film, the fourth instalment in the Bridget Jones film series, is based on the 2013 novel. The film was released In the United States on 13 February 2025 on the streaming service Peacock, and in cinemas internationally on 14 February 2025 by Universal Pictures. The revelation about the fate of Mark Darcy in the film's trailer reportedly "horrified" the fans.

Actors Renée Zellweger (Bridget Jones), Colin Firth (Mark Darcy), and Hugh Grant (Daniel Cleaver) are joined by Leo Woodall (Roxster) and Chiwetel Ejiofor (Scott Wallaker).
