= Cause célèbre (disambiguation) =

A cause célèbre is an issue or incident arousing widespread controversy.

Cause célèbre may also refer to:

- Cause Célèbre (play), a 1975 radio play by Terence Rattigan
- Cause Célèbre, a 2014 album by American indie pop band Fan Modine
- "Cause Célèbre", a 1986 episode of the British TV series Duty Free
- Une cause célèbre, an 1877 French play adapted into the 1914 American film A Celebrated Case

== See also ==
- Cause Celeb, a 1994 novel by Helen Fielding
- Petites causes célèbres, an 1857 French play by Frédéric Thomas
