= London Film Critics Circle Awards 2001 =

British film awards ceremony

22nd London Film Critics Circle Awards

13 February 2002

Film of the Year:
Moulin Rouge!

British Film of the Year:
Gosford Park

The 22nd London Film Critics Circle Awards, honouring the best in film for 2001, were announced by the London Film Critics Circle on 13 February 2002.

== Winners ==
Film of the Year

- Moulin Rouge!

British Film of the Year

- Gosford Park

Foreign Language Film of the Year

- Amélie • France

Director of the Year

- Alejandro González Iñárritu – Amores perros

British Director of the Year

- Gurinder Chadha – What's Cooking?

Screenwriter of the Year

- Joel and Ethan Coen – The Man Who Wasn't There

British Screenwriter of the Year

- Richard Curtis, Andrew Davies and Helen Fielding – Bridget Jones's Diary

Actor of the Year

- Billy Bob Thornton – The Man Who Wasn't There

Actress of the Year

- Nicole Kidman – Moulin Rouge! and The Others

British Actor of the Year

- Ewan McGregor – Moulin Rouge!

British Actress of the Year

- Judi Dench – Iris

British Supporting Actor of the Year

- Paul Bettany – A Knight's Tale

British Supporting Actress of the Year

- Helen Mirren – Gosford Park and Last Orders

British Newcomer of the Year

- Colin Farrell – Tigerland

Dilys Powell Award

- Charlotte Rampling
