= Gemma Jones =

British actress (born 1942)

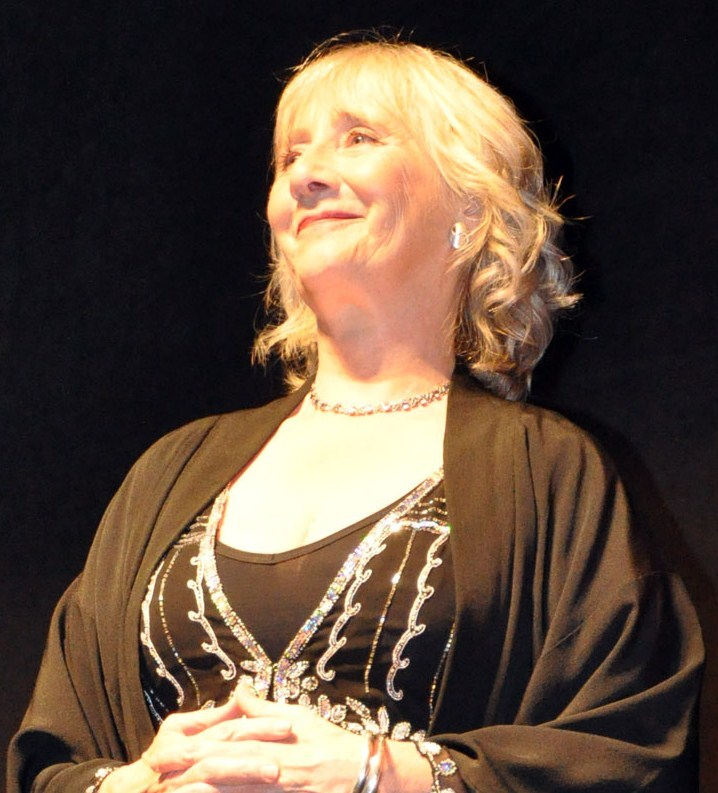
- Jones at the screening of You Will Meet a Tall Dark Stranger at the 2010 Toronto International Film Festival
- Born: Jennifer Jones; 4 December 1942 (age 83); London, England
- Education: Royal Academy of Dramatic Art (RADA)
- Occupation: Actress
- Years active: 1962–present
- Children: 1
- Parent: Griffith Jones
- Relatives: Nicholas Jones (brother)

Jennifer "Gemma" Jones (born 4 December 1942) is an English actress. Appearing on both stage and screen, her film appearances include Sense and Sensibility (1995), the Bridget Jones series (2001–2025), the Harry Potter series (2002–2011), You Will Meet a Tall Dark Stranger (2010), and Ammonite (2020).

For her role in the BBC television film Marvellous (2014), she won the 2015 BAFTA TV Award for Best Supporting Actress. She had received three previous nominations in the Best Actress category in 1971, 1972, and 1977 for her television roles. Her other roles on television include Rainbow City (1967), The Duchess of Duke Street (1976–1977), Trial & Retribution (2003–2008), Spooks (2007–2008), Teacup Travels (2015–2017), Diana and I (2017), and Gentleman Jack (2019).

On the stage, Jones was nominated for the Laurence Olivier Award for Actress of the Year in a New Play for And a Nightingale Sang in 1979.

== Early life and education ==
Jennifer Jones was born on 4 December 1942 in London, the daughter of Irene (née Isaac) and Harold "Griffith" Jones, an actor. Her brother Nicholas Jones is also an actor.

She attended the Royal Academy of Dramatic Art (RADA), where she won the gold medal.

== Career ==
During the 1960s, Gemma Jones performed with companies at regional theatres including the Nottingham Playhouse, Birmingham Repertory Theatre and the Little Theatre, Bristol. In 1962 she appeared at the Mermaid Theatre as Gilda in the original stage production of Alfie. In the 1970s, Jones performed in productions with the National Theatre at the Old Vic and with the Royal Shakespeare Company as Hippolyta/Titania. Jones made many further performances in classical and contemporary plays with the RSC in the 1980s and 1990s, including appearances in separate productions of The Winters Tale as both Hermione (1981) and a decade later as Paulina (1993). In 1986, she played the soprano Giuseppina Strepponi in After Aida at the Old Vic Theatre.

On television Jones became known to viewers after starring in the BBC serial Kenilworth (1967) as Queen Elizabeth I, and in BBC 2's 1970 dramatisation of The Spoils of Poynton.

She was first recognised outside the UK in the mid-1970s, after playing the Empress Frederick in the BBC television drama series Fall of Eagles and Louisa Trotter in another BBC drama, The Duchess of Duke Street. In 1980, she played the role of Portia in the BBC Television Shakespeare production of The Merchant of Venice, opposite Warren Mitchell's Shylock.

Jones was nominated for the Laurence Olivier Award for Actress of the Year in a New Play for And a Nightingale Sang in 1979.

Jones played Madeleine de Brou in the 1971 Ken Russell film The Devils. She played Mrs. Dashwood alongside Kate Winslet, Alan Rickman and Emma Thompson in the Academy Award-winning period drama Sense and Sensibility (1995). Her other notable roles include Mrs. Fairfax in Jane Eyre (1997), Lady Queensbury in Wilde (1997), Grace Winslow in The Winslow Boy (1999), Bridget's mother Pamela Jones in Bridget Jones's Diary (2001) and Poppy Pomfrey in Harry Potter and the Chamber of Secrets (2002), reprising her role in Harry Potter and the Half-Blood Prince (2009) and Harry Potter and the Deathly Hallows – Part 2 (2011).

From 2007 to 2008, she played Connie James in the BBC1 drama Spooks. She appeared in the Woody Allen film You Will Meet a Tall Dark Stranger in 2010. In 2011, she appeared in the BBC1 series Merlin, as the Cailleach, the gatekeeper to the spirit world. Also in 2011 she appeared in the Bridge Project's version of Richard III as Queen Margaret, alongside Kevin Spacey as Richard III and directed by Sam Mendes, at the Old Vic and subsequently on an international tour.

She received the British Academy Television Award for Best Supporting Actress for her portrayal of Neil Baldwin's mother, Mary, in the 2014 television film Marvellous.

In 2015, Jones played the part of Petunia Howe in the three-part BBC series Capital, based on John Lanchester's novel of the same name. In the 2018 BBC Radio 4 production of The Importance of Being Earnest Jones played the part of Lady Augusta Bracknell.

Jones has twice played the same part of Anne Lister's aunt, first in the 2010 BBC telefilm The Secret Diaries of Miss Anne Lister and again in the 2019-2022 BBC/HBO programme Gentleman Jack.

== Personal life ==
Jones has one son, Lucas, from her relationship with actor and theatre director Sebastian Graham Jones.

== Filmography ==
=== Film ===
Year	Title	Role	Notes
1971	The Devils	Madeleine	
1988	Paperhouse	Dr. Sarah Nicols	
1988	On the Black Hill	Mary Jones	
1995	Feast of July	Mrs. Wainwright	
1995	Sense and Sensibility	Mrs. Dashwood	
1997	Wilde	Lady Queensberry	
1998	OK Garage	Mrs. Wiggins	
1998	The Theory of Flight	Anne	
1999	The Winslow Boy	Grace Winslow	
1999	Captain Jack	Eunice Pickles	
1999	Cotton Mary	Mrs Freda Davids	
2001	Bridget Jones's Diary	Pamela Jones	
2001	Don't Tempt Me	Nancy	
2002	Harry Potter and the Chamber of Secrets	Madam Poppy Pomfrey	
2003	Shanghai Knights	Queen Victoria	
2003	Kiss of Life	Sonia	
2004	Bridget Jones: The Edge of Reason	Pamela Jones	
2005	Fragile	Mrs. Folder	
2007	The Contractor	Mrs. Day	Short
2008	Good	Mother	
2009	Harry Potter and the Half-Blood Prince	Madam Poppy Pomfrey	
2010	You Will Meet a Tall Dark Stranger	Helena	
2010	Forget me Not	Lizzie Fisher	
2011	Harry Potter and the Deathly Hallows – Part 2	Madam Poppy Pomfrey	
2011	Hysteria	Lady St. John-Smythe	
2013	Burn the Clock	Becky	Short
2014	Radiator	Maria	
2016	Bridget Jones's Baby	Pamela Jones	
2017	God's Own Country	Deirdre Saxby	
2017	Carnage	Davina	
2017	Gypsy's Kiss	Judith	Short
2017	You, Me and Him	Sue Miller	
2018	The Egg and the Thieving Pie	Thelma	
2018	Patrick	Celia	
2019	Rocketman	Ivy	
2020	Ammonite	Molly Anning	
2021	Benediction	Older Hester Gatty	
2022	Emily	Aunt Branwell	
2023	Wicked Little Letters	Victoria Swan	
2025	Bridget Jones: Mad About the Boy	Pamela Jones	

=== Television ===
Year	Title	Role	Note
1962	ITV Play of the Week	Postmistress	Episode: "The Typewriter"
1962	No Hiding Place	Brenda	
1963	The Human Jungle	Pamela Phillips	Episode: "The Vacant Chair"
1963	ITV Television Playhouse	Rachel	Episode: "Adam's Apple"
1965	Theatre 625	Victoire / Lucille Desmoulins	Episode: "Poor Bitos"
1966	ITV Play of the Week	Vera Fawcett	Episode: "Come Laughing Home"
1966	Thirteen Against Fate	Antoinette Baron	Episode: "The Lodger"
1966	Theatre 625	Nina	Episode: "The Seagull"
1967	Rainbow City	Mary Steele	4 episodes
1968	Sanctuary	Sister Stephens	Episode: "The Novice"
1969	The Wednesday Play	Clarice	Episode: "Smoke Screen"
1970	Crime of Passion	Nicole Delcourt	Episode: "Nicole"
1970	The Spoils of Poynton	Fleda Vetch	4 episodes
1971	Shadows of Fear	Judith	Episode: "At Occupier's Risk"
1974	Fall of Eagles	Princess Vicky	2 episodes
1976–1977	The Duchess of Duke Street	Louisa Trotter	31 episodes
1980	The Merchant of Venice	Portia	TV movie
1986	The Importance of Being Earnest	Miss Prism	TV movie
1987	Inspector Morse	Anne Staveley	Episode: "The Dead of Jericho"
1988	The Storyteller	Queen	Episode: "The Heartless Giant"
1989	Chelworth	Virginia Hincham	8 episodes
1990	The Ruth Rendell Mysteries	Mrs Peveril	3 episodes
1991	Devices and Desires – Adam Dalgliesh	Alice Mair	6 episodes
1993	Wycliffe and the Cycle of Death	Sara Glynn	TV movie
1993	Screen One	Nicky Dobbs	Episode: "Tender Loving Care"
1993	The Return of the Borrowers	Miss Menzies	3 episodes
1994	Faith	Jane Moreton	4 episodes
1997	Jane Eyre	Mrs Fairfax	
1997	The Phoenix and the Carpet	Mrs Bibble	6 episodes
1999	An Evil Streak	Beatrice Kyle	3 episodes
2002	Bootleg	Mrs Bubby	3 episodes
2002	Midsomer Murders	Maisie Gooch	Episode: "Ring Out Your Dead"
2003	Agatha Christie's Poirot	Miss Cecilia Williams	Episode: "Five Little Pigs"
2003–2008	Trial & Retribution	Dr Jean Mullins	10 episodes
2005	All About George	Kate Kinsey	6 episodes
2007	Ballet Shoes	Dr Jakes	TV movie
2007–2008	Spooks	Connie James	16 episodes
2010	The Secret Diaries of Miss Anne Lister	Aunt Lister	TV movie
2010	Whistle and I'll Come to You	Alice Parkin	TV movie
2011	Merlin	The Cailleach	2 episodes
2013	The Lady Vanishes	Rose Flood-Porter	TV movie
2013	Death in Paradise	Sister Anne	Episode: "An Unholy Death"
2013	Last Tango in Halifax	Muriel	2 episodes
2014	Marvellous	Mary	TV movie
2015	Doc Martin	Annie Winton	2 episodes
2015	Unforgotten	Claire Slater	6 episodes
2015	Capital	Petunia	3 episodes
2015–2017	Teacup Travels	Great Aunt Lizzie	45 episodes
2017	Diana and I	Mrs McDonald	TV movie
2019–2022	Gentleman Jack	Aunt Anne Lister	16 episodes
2020	Cold Feet	Heather Childs	1 episode
2020	The Crown	Penelope Carter	Episode: "The Hereditary Principle"
2021	Finding Alice	Minnie	6 episodes
2023	The Reckoning	Agnes Savile	2 episodes
2024	Murder, They Hope	Brenda	1 episode
2025	I, Jack Wright	Rose Wright	6 episodes

=== Video games ===
Year	Title	Role
2018	Harry Potter: Hogwarts Mystery	Madam Pomfrey (voice)

== Other projects, contributions ==
- When Love Speaks (2002, EMI Classics) – Shakespeare's "Sonnet 50" ("How heavy do I journey on the way")
