= Cause Celeb =

Novel by Helen Fielding

- Author: Helen Fielding
- Language: English
- Genre: Comedy novel, Chick lit
- Publication date: 1994 novel
- Publication place: United Kingdom
- Media type: Print (Hardback & Paperback)
- ISBN: 0-330-41225-6
- OCLC: 50495362

Cause Celeb is the debut novel of Helen Fielding, later known for her creation of the character Bridget Jones. The novel is about a few years in the life of Rosie Richardson, who decides to go to Africa after she breaks up with her boyfriend, Oliver Marchant, a TV presenter. But after four years working in Nambula, a fictional country in Northern Africa, there is a famine coming and Rosie turns back to Oliver and his famous friends to get the food they desperately need.

== Plot summary ==
Rosie Richardson works in marketing at a publisher, when she starts dating Oliver Merchant, and falls in love with him. Oliver is the host of the TV show called SoftFocus where they tackle mostly cultural and political topics. Their relationship is formed by his erratic behaviour, like one day telling her he loves her and then not calling for days.

When Rosie has to go to Nambula on a business trip, the poverty and general environment shock her into the realisation that she wants to spend her life doing something meaningful. So she breaks up with Oliver and leaves to go to Nambula and work at a refugee camp, organised by Sustain.

Four years later, she is running the camp and feels attracted to a new doctor, Robert O'Rourke. Unfortunately, rumours about a locust invasion spread and about the shipping of food that will be late.

So Rosie decides that she has to take matters into her own hands. She flies back to England and gets in touch with Oliver and his circle of famous friends to raise funds. After some convincing, the stars and Rosie fly to Nambula for a one-hour fundraising show. In the meantime, Oliver attempts reuniting with Rosie, who refuses him.

After they handle some catastrophes, the show airs and is a full success. Food is delivered, the stars fly back and Rosie gets together with O'Rourke.
