= Donald Douglas (Scottish actor) =

Scottish actor (1933–2026)

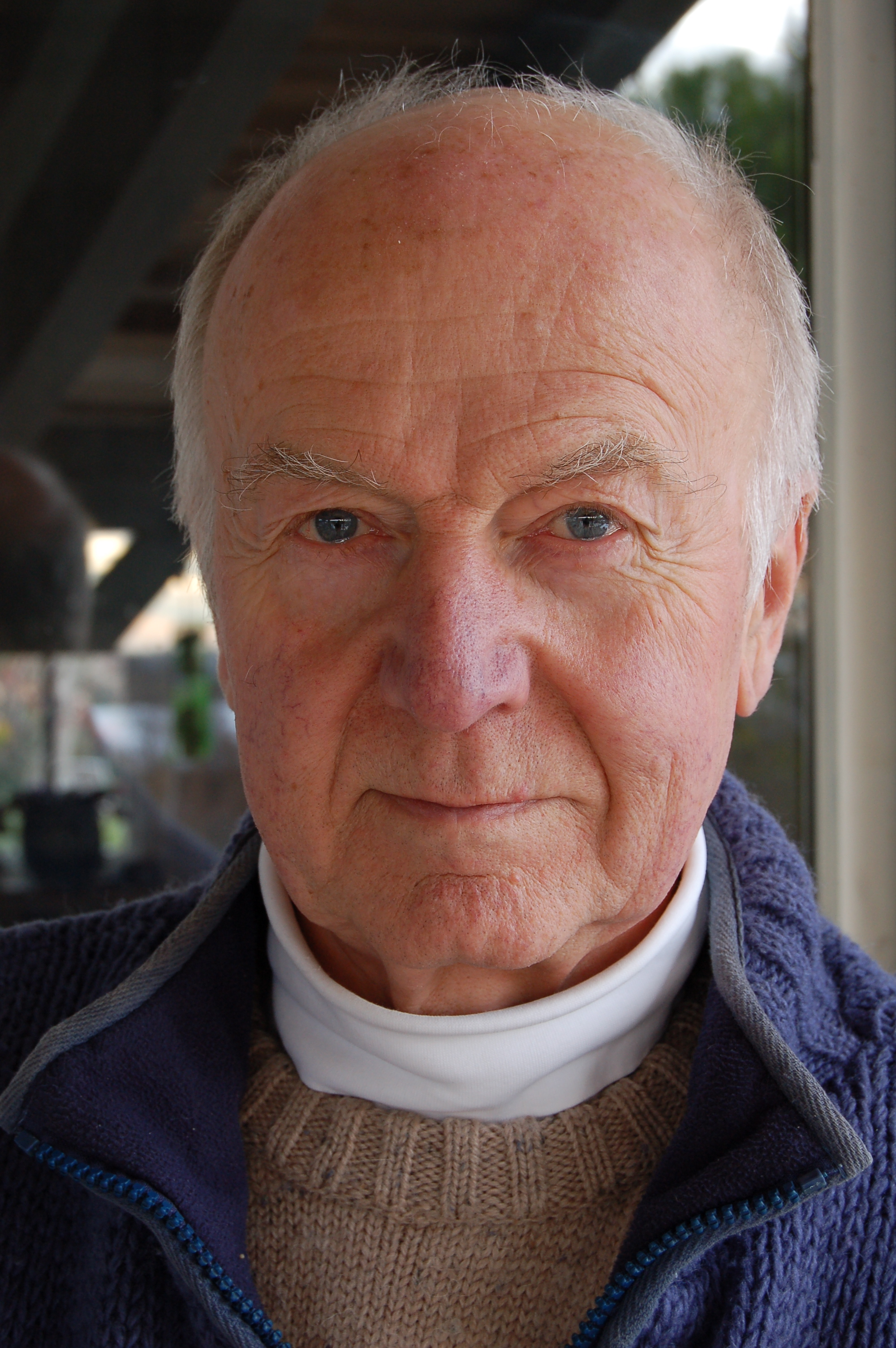
- Born: Donald Macleod Douglas; 7 March 1933; Falkirk, Scotland
- Died: 14 January 2026 (aged 92); Albi, France
- Education: Edinburgh College of Art; Royal Academy of Dramatic Art
- Occupation: Actor
- Years active: 1960–2021
- Notable work: Bridget Jones

Donald Douglas (7 March 1933 – 14 January 2026) was a Scottish actor who appeared in films and many well known television shows.

== Early life ==
Donald MacLeod Douglas was born in Falkirk, Scotland on 7 March 1933. He was educated at Falkirk High School, Edinburgh College of Art and RADA.

== Career ==
His first professional stage appearance was at the Citizens Theatre, Glasgow. He then appeared in repertory theatres in England and on the West End stage.

His film appearances include A Bridge Too Far (1977), Highlander: Endgame (2000) and the role of Admiral Darcy in the Bridget Jones film series.

On television, he played Tsar Alexander I in the 1972 BBC television adaptation of War and Peace, alongside Anthony Hopkins. He starred in the original TV series of Poldark in 1975/6 as Malcolm McNeil, the army captain who frequently allowed his fondness for Demelza Poldark to obstruct his quest to arrest her husband. He is also remembered by cult TV fans for roles in Doctor Who, Blake's 7, and The Avengers. His TV career continued into the 1990s, playing Franklin Clarke in the 1992 Agatha Christie's Poirot movie The ABC Murders. He has also played Dr. Gordon McKendrick on several episodes of Monarch of the Glen, and has appeared in episodes of EastEnders, Kavanagh QC and Casualty.

== Death ==
Douglas died in Albi, France on 14 January 2026, at the age of 92.

== Filmography ==
=== Film ===
Year	Title	Role	Notes
1960	Tunes of Glory	Minor Role	uncredited
1977	A Bridge Too Far	Brig. Gerald Lathbury	
1981	Peter and Paul	Burrus	
1984	Give My Regards to Broad Street	Police Detective	
1992	Creatures of Light	Minister	
1997	Photographing Fairies	Judge	
1998	What Rats Won't Do	Diner on Boat	
2000	Highlander: Endgame	Father Rainy	
2000	Greenfingers	Nigel aka Jailbuds	
2001	Bridget Jones's Diary	Admiral Darcy	
2001	From Hell	Hospital Director	
2004	Bridget Jones: The Edge of Reason	Admiral Darcy	
2016	Bridget Jones's Baby	Admiral Darcy	
2021	Nobody Has to Know	Nigel's man handler	

=== Television ===
Year	Title	Role	Notes
1961	Rob Roy	Frank Osbaldistone	7 episodes
1969	The Avengers	Major Parsons	1 episode: "The Morning After"
1971	Play for Today	Ronald	"Orkney" episode, "Celia" instalment, with Hannah Gordon
1971–72	Budgie	Tony Pringle	Budgie's brother-in-law
1972	War and Peace	Tsar Alexander I	
1975	Doctor Who	Vural	The Sontaran Experiment
1975	Lord Peter Wimsey	Hugh Farren	Five Red Herrings
1975	Poldark	Captain Malcolm MacNeil	
1977	The Professionals	Eric Sutton	
1980	Blake's 7	Major Grenlee	1 episode: "Rumours of Death"
1980	Take the High Road	Peter Cunningham	
1981	Sense and Sensibility	Sir John Middleton	
1982	Young Sherlock: The Mystery of the Manor House	Colonel Turnbull	7 episodes
1989	Goldeneye	Lord Kemsley	
1992	Agatha Christie's Poirot	Franklin Clarke	1 episode: The A.B.C. Murders
1993	Diana: Her True Story	Prince Philip	
1994	Alleyn Mysteries	Sir George Alleyn	Scales of Justice
1995	EastEnders	Hugh Aitken	3 episodes
1996–99	Kavanagh QC	Mr. Justice Halliwell	2 episodes
1999	Goodnight Sweetheart	Angus	"California Dreamin'"
2001	Sweet Revenge	Patrick's father	
2002	A Is for Acid	William McSwan	
2003	Casualty	Teddy	"Flash in the Pan"
2004–05	Monarch of the Glen	Dr Gordon McKendrick	3 episodes

== Theatre credits ==
Theatre credits include:

- Medea, Broadway, Longacre Theatre (1994) – Aegeus
