= Sandra Gregory =

British teacher (born 1965)

Sandra Gregory (born 1965) is a British teacher who was imprisoned for four years in Thailand after being caught trying to smuggle heroin out of Bangkok's Don Muang Airport. She was then transferred to a UK prison for three years, before being pardoned by the King of Thailand. Gregory has since earned an Oxford degree and published her memoirs.

== Arrest and jail ==
Gregory had spent two years travelling around Thailand and living in Bangkok, sometimes working as an English language teacher. Suffering a bout of dengue fever, Gregory was unable to work; her money was running out and she was desperate to return to the UK. She met and became friends with Robert Lock from her home country. She claims that soon after they met, he made her a proposal, "Come to Tokyo with me and if you hide my drugs on your person, I will give you £1000." Gregory agreed to carry Lock's 89 grams of heroin, for his personal use, from Bangkok to Tokyo.

On arrival together at Bangkok's Don Muang Airport on 3 February 1993, Lock, his girlfriend Ruth, and Gregory were detained after a tip-off about Lock. While security personnel interviewed Lock, Gregory was also observed to be nervous. All three were searched and x-rayed. Gregory was the only person carrying illegal items; the drugs hidden inside her body were detected. Lock and Gregory were arrested; the girlfriend was released. Gregory was held at the Lard Yao Women's section within Bangkok's Klong Prem Central Prison, notorious for its brutality, drug abuse, squalid conditions and severe overcrowding. She befriended other foreign prisoners Karyn Smith from the UK, and Australian Nola Blake.

Gregory spent three years at Lard Yao before being convicted. In court she entered a guilty plea to possession and attempting to smuggle heroin out of Thailand. She was carrying 89 grams; it is standard procedure in Thailand to give the death sentence to those smuggling more than 100 grams of heroin. Lock pleaded not guilty; he was found not guilty by the courts and released. Gregory was found guilty and was sentenced to death. This was subsequently reduced to life imprisonment, then downgraded further to 25 years the same day.

== Transfer to Britain ==
After spending four years in Lard Yao, Gregory was transferred at her choice to Britain in 1997 to complete the remainder of her sentence (21 years). She found she was imprisoned in maximum security prisons there: in the UK prisoners were classified by the length of their sentence despite the fact that in the UK, trafficking would have attracted a much shorter sentence. In one letter to her parents she said "I wish I had stayed in Thailand". She spent hours confined to her cell in England. In Lard Yao, prisoners had the freedom to roam around the prison and the grounds. She claimed to be “happy” in Lard Yao, as she could see the blue sky and the green trees in the prison garden.

After years of campaigning by her parents for her release, the King of Thailand granted Gregory a Royal Pardon and she was released on 20 July 2000. She wrote a book about her experiences, titled Forget You Had a Daughter. It was released as a hardback in 2002 by Vision. The paperback edition was published in 2004 by Vision Paperbacks.

== After release ==
A few weeks after being released from prison, Gregory applied to Oxford University. She started studying geography as a mature student at Harris Manchester College in 2002. Prior to attending Oxford, she took a year out to tour schools and talk about her experiences in the hopes of dissuading others from making the same mistakes she did.

She said in 2001, "I thought my CV looks blotchy, I've got a criminal record and I'm not part of mainstream society so I'll not get a place. But I did and I found that the college I had applied to takes people on their individual merits. They accept a diversity of students who have something to offer."

Gregory said in 2004 that the scenes in the novel Bridget Jones: The Edge of Reason and its film adaptation involving the Thai prison probably received inspiration from her incident since author Helen Fielding knew the next door neighbours of her parents and presumably would have talked to them.

Gregory appeared in the 2006 British documentary series Banged Up Abroad where she talked about the experience.

== See also ==
- Sharon Carr – murderer who she was imprisoned with in Britain
