= Olivia Joules and the Overactive Imagination =

2003 novel by Helen Fielding

Olivia Joules and The Overactive Imagination
- Author: Helen Fielding
- Language: English
- Genre: Thriller novel
- Publication date: 2003
- Publication place: United Kingdom
- Media type: Print (Hardback & Paperback)

Olivia Joules and the Overactive Imagination is Helen Fielding's fifth book, a spy novel published in 2003. It chronicles the adventures of Olivia Joules (birth name Rachel Pixley), a freelance journalist with an "overactive imagination". After meeting the handsome Pierre Feramo, Olivia immediately comes to the conclusion that he is a terrorist and follows him around the world to confirm her suspicions whilst falling for another man.

== Plot ==
Olivia Jules, a journalist for the British Sunday Times newspaper and Elan magazine is in Miami to cover the launch of a face cream when she meets Pierre Feramo, who she finds attractive, but also suspicious.

While Olivia is in Miami, a cruise ship docks in the harbor. When Olivia is passing the cruise ship on the way to meet Feramo, a terrorist bomb blows the ship up. Olivia helps to rescue survivors but hundreds are killed.

Soon afterwards, in Los Angeles, Olivia meets Feramo again, working on a movie. Olivia calls the FBI with her suspicions about Feramo, but is interrupted. She also has her room swept for bugs and finds one. Feramo invites Olivia to his house in LA. There she finds a secret room. Frame and Olivia take a helicopter to an island off the California coast. Feramo admits he is a muslim but tells Olivia he didn’t bug her. He invites her scuba diving in Honduras.

Instead of going straight to Feramo’s resort, Olivia makes her own way to Honduras. She meets the local divers including one called Morton, who she is also attracted to. Olivia becomes more suspicious of Feramo because of the rumours about his resort. Feramo then tricks Olivia into coming to his resort. She bluffs her way out, and returns to London.

In London, Olivia meets Morton again, who reveals himself as a CIA agent working with MI6. They’re investigating Feramo and recruit Olivia to go to Sudan to discover what his plan is.

When she gets to Sudan, Olivia discovers she has been betrayed. Feramo's associates plan to kill her, but using MI6 gadgets, she escapes, photographing Feramo’s plans on the way. Feramo chases her, but Morton arrives, punches Feramo and rescues her. Feramo is then eaten by a shark.

Olivia is worried that Feramo's movie was a cover for a terror attack on The Oscars. She realises the Oscar statues are bombs and races to save the ceremony. Morton collects the statues, and eventually Olivia manages to subdue the bomber. The statues then explode harmlessly.

Olivia and Morton become lovers, and Olivia becomes a permanent MI6 agent.

== Inspiration ==
In an interview with BBC News, Helen Fielding was inspired for this book by the way the world responded to the September 11 attacks. She once spent some time in Sudan as a journalist and loved her time there. In light of the invasion of Iraq, Fielding wondered why they had not sent a female spy in to interview the perpetrator. She felt that women have an air of innocence around them that men lack. Olivia parallels James Bond in many ways and Fielding was very fond of Ian Fleming's novels.
