= Bridget Jones's Baby =

2016 film by Sharon Maguire

- Theatrical release poster
- Directed by: Sharon Maguire
- Screenplay by: Helen Fielding; Dan Mazer; Emma Thompson
- Story by: Helen Fielding
- Based on: Characters by Helen Fielding
- Produced by: Tim Bevan; Eric Fellner; Debra Hayward
- Starring: Renée Zellweger; Colin Firth; Patrick Dempsey; Jim Broadbent; Gemma Jones; Emma Thompson
- Cinematography: Andrew Dunn
- Edited by: Melanie Oliver
- Music by: Craig Armstrong
- Production companies: StudioCanal; Miramax; Working Title Films
- Distributed by: Universal Pictures (International); StudioCanal (France)
- Release dates: 5 September 2016 (Odeon Leicester Square); 16 September 2016 (United States and United Kingdom); 5 October 2016 (France)
- Running time: 123 minutes
- Countries: France; United Kingdom; United States
- Language: English
- Budget: $35 million
- Box office: $212 million

Bridget Jones's Baby is a 2016 romantic comedy film directed by Sharon Maguire from a screenplay by Helen Fielding, Dan Mazer, and Emma Thompson, based on a story by Fielding. It is the sequel to Bridget Jones: The Edge of Reason (2004) and the third installment in the Bridget Jones film series. The film once again stars Renée Zellweger as Bridget Jones, who is shocked when she finds out she is pregnant and must deduce which of her two recent loves is the father, lawyer Mark Darcy (Colin Firth, also reprising his role) or mathematician Jack Qwant (Patrick Dempsey), all while trying to hide one from the other.

The film marked Zellweger's return to the screen after a six-year hiatus. Bridget Jones's Baby premiered at the Odeon Leicester Square in London on 5 September 2016 and was released in the United Kingdom and United States on 16 September. The film received generally positive reviews from critics and grossed over $211 million worldwide against a production budget of $35 million. Bridget Jones's Baby was nominated for a European Film Academy Lux Award and a Globe de Cristal Award for Best Foreign Film. A sequel, Bridget Jones: Mad About the Boy, was released in 2025.

== Plot ==
On her forty-third birthday, Bridget Jones attends the memorial service for her ex, Daniel Cleaver, presumed dead after a plane crash. Her other ex, Mark Darcy, attends with his wife Camilla.

Bridget is now a television producer and friends with co-worker Miranda. After spending her birthday alone, Bridget decides to embrace single life, accepting Miranda's offer to go to a music festival where she meets a handsome man, Jack. That evening, Bridget drunkenly crawls into his yurt, thinking it is hers and Miranda's. They have a one-night stand. In the morning, waking alone, Bridget leaves, unaware Jack is out getting them breakfast.

A week later Bridget attends her friend Jude's baby's christening, as godmother. Mark is asked to be the godfather at the last minute. He tells her he and Camilla are divorcing and Camilla was only at the memorial for moral support. Realising they are still in love, Bridget and Mark spend the night together. She exits before he wakes up, leaving a note telling him she fears reconnecting would only repeat their past mistakes.

Weeks later, Bridget discovers she is pregnant. She decides to keep the baby despite being single. After a visit to Dr. Rawlings' clinic, she realises the father could be either Mark or Jack. Bridget is unable to contact Jack until Miranda spots him on television and discovers he is billionaire mathematician Jack Qwant, creator of a dating website.

Bridget and Miranda conspire to interview Jack on their show. He recognises Bridget and asks why she left after their night together. She apologises, blurting out that she is pregnant, without mentioning Mark.

Initially taken aback, Jack throws himself into the role of expectant father. Bridget also tells Mark the news; he is so thrilled that she cannot bear to tell him about Jack. Rawlings proposes an amniocentesis DNA test, but Bridget declines, fearing miscarriage.

Bridget invites Jack to a work event, and is startled when Mark also shows up. The three go out to dinner, where Bridget finally tells them she is unsure who the father is. Although disappointed, Jack takes the news well, but Mark is upset and walks out, although he eventually becomes supportive, and the trio attend prenatal classes. Mark and Jack eventually become jealous of each other's bond with Bridget and try to one-up each other.

Mark becomes increasingly envious of Bridget and Jack's close relationship and is devastated when Jack lets him believe he and Bridget had unprotected sex, making it more likely for Jack to be the father. Mark leaves, ignoring Bridget's calls. Jack asks her to move in, but he eventually confesses what he told Mark. Upset, Bridget rushes to tell Mark, but seeing Camilla arriving at his house, she walks away.

Late in her pregnancy, Bridget is locked out in the rain. Mark arrives and breaks into her flat for her. He tells her that Camilla was just collecting the last of her belongings. Just as they are about to kiss, her waters break. When his mobile rings, Mark impulsively throws it out the window, leaving them without means to call help.

They eventually make it to the hospital with help from a pizza deliveryman and Jack, who apologises to Mark for his behaviour. Bridget gives birth to a healthy baby boy, William, and her friends and parents visit, her mother coming from her freshly-won, parish-council election she had won with Bridget's help in liberalising her campaign. Rawlings takes Mark and Jack away to perform DNA tests, and they genuinely wish each other luck.

A year later, Bridget marries Mark. Jack is his best man, showing no sign of resentment or jealousy, happily playing with William, Mark's son. Bridget expresses her contentment that everything worked out. A newspaper headline reveals that Daniel Cleaver has been found alive.

== Cast ==
- Renée Zellweger as Bridget Jones
- Colin Firth as Mark Darcy, QC
- Patrick Dempsey as Jack Qwant
- Jim Broadbent as Colin Jones, Bridget's father
- Gemma Jones as Pamela Jones, Bridget's mother
- Sarah Solemani as Miranda, Bridget's friend and Hard News's anchorwoman
- James Callis as Tom
- Shirley Henderson as Jude
- Sally Phillips as Sharon "Shazzer"
- Neil Pearson as Richard Finch, Bridget's colleague
- Kate O'Flynn as Alice Peabody, Hard News's manager
- Emma Thompson as Dr. Rawlings
- Julian Rhind-Tutt as Fergus, Shazzer's husband
- Ben Willbond as Giles, Jude's husband
- Agni Scott as Camilla, Mark's former wife
- Katia Elizarova an ex-girlfriend of Daniel Cleaver
- Tom Rosenthal as Josh, a researcher of Hard News
- Beattie Edmondson as Laura, young assistant of Bridget
- Laura Checkley as Susan, floor manager of Hard News
- Joanna Scanlan as Cathy, Hard News's make-up artist
- Erron Gordon as Hard News director
- Patrick Malahide as George Wilkins, foreign secretary
- Ed Sheeran as himself
- Darren Boyd as Jeremy
- Jessica Hynes as Magda, Bridget's friend and a lawyer's wife
- Dolly Wells as Woney, Bridget's old friend
- Enzo Cilenti as Gianni, the owner of an Italian restaurant
- Nick Mohammed as Ariyaratna, the Area manager for DTC technological solutions
- Celia Imrie as Una Alconbury, Pamela's friend
- Ashley McGuire as Midwife
- Janet Henfrey as Mavis Enderbury
- Shirley Dixon as Geraldine Darcy, Mark's mother
- Donald Douglas as Admiral Darcy, Mark's father
- James Faulkner as Uncle Geoffrey, Una's husband

== Production ==
=== Development ===
In July 2009, Variety announced that a third Bridget Jones film was in the early stages of development. Working Title Films confirmed that it would not be based on Helen Fielding's third Bridget Jones novel, but instead would be based on the columns she wrote for The Independent in 2005.

On 1 March 2011, it was reported that both Renée Zellweger and Colin Firth were interested in reprising their roles. In July 2011, Paul Feig was in final talks to direct the film based on the script by author Fielding. On 11 August 2011, Universal Studios and Working Title greenlit the third film. On 4 October 2011, Deadline reported that Feig had exited the project due to creative differences with Working Title, and Feig had also worked on the recent draft of the script. Production was slated to begin in January 2012 with the returning cast including Zellweger, Firth, and Hugh Grant. On 30 November 2011, Peter Cattaneo came on board to direct the sequel, newly titled "Bridget Jones's Baby" from a script by Fielding, Feig, and David Nicholls. Producers on board were Tim Bevan and Eric Fellner of Working Title, along with Jonathan Cavendish of Little Bird. The production was delayed due to creative differences between the script of the film and actors, especially Grant as he reportedly disliked the script and left the project, though this was denied by producer Bevan. However, the producer confirmed that they were working on the script and the film would be made as planned.

In April 2013, Firth spoke to the Chicago Sun-Times, stating "unfortunately, it might be a bit of a long wait", and he said he "wouldn't say that it's completely dead in the water, but the way it's going, you might be seeing Bridget Jones's granddaughter's story being told by the time we get there."

In an interview on 10 October 2014, Grant mentioned an existing script for a sequel, though he also expressed his dislike for it, and stated that he would not star in the third film. In a 2024 interview, Grant also stated he couldn't find a place to fit in the film. Later in the next week, producers hired Emma Thompson to rewrite the original script written by Fielding and Nicholls.

Gemma Jones and Jim Broadbent were in talks to return for the third film to join the cast. On 9 September 2015, Patrick Dempsey joined the cast of the film.

=== Filming ===
Set, Windsor Great Park, as Glastonbury

Filming for a short period began in Dublin in July 2015, when the first scenes for the film were shot at Ed Sheeran's concert at Croke Park. Official principal photography with the actual cast began on 2 October 2015 in London.

The Television Studio interior scenes, the Hospital Ward interiors and various other scenes were shot on Stages 5 and 6 at West London Film Studios. On 13 October 2015, shooting was taking place at Borough Market, and later that month in Windsor Great Park, at Rosy Bottom. Filming wrapped on 27 November 2015. Reshoots took place for one week starting 8 January 2016.

== Release ==
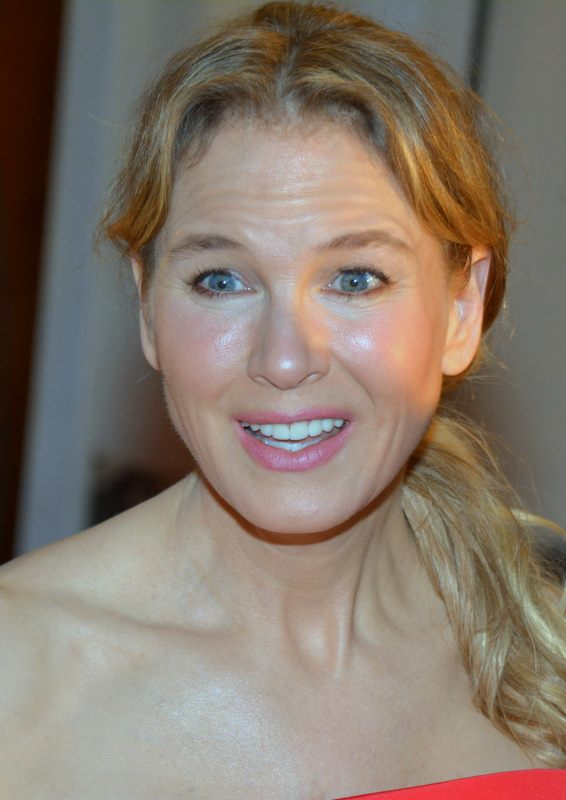
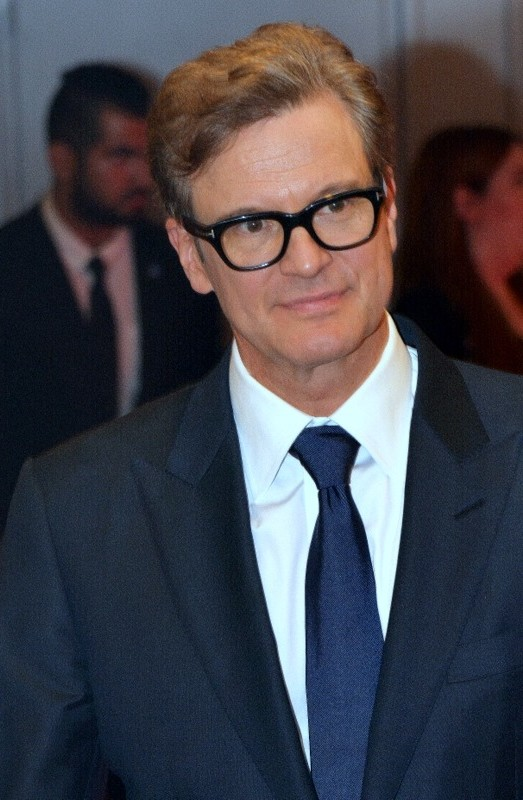
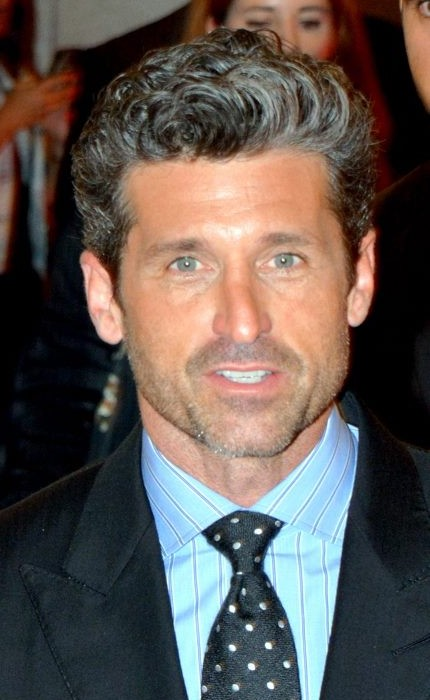
Renée Zellweger, Colin Firth and Patrick Dempsey in Paris at the film's French premiere, 2016.

In October 2015, Bridget Jones's Baby was set for a 16 September 2016 release. On 23 March the first trailer was released. Like the previous two films, the movie received an R rating in the United States.

Zellweger's physical appearance in the trailer for the film rekindled a debate about the possibility that Zellweger had plastic surgery, which began in 2014 when she re-emerged from a long hiatus. An editorial focused on the trailer for the film by Variety critic Owen Gleiberman titled "Renee Zellweger: If She No Longer Looks Like Herself, Has She Become a Different Actress?" prompted a response from Zellweger, who called the scrutiny over her appearance "sexist" and attributing her difference in appearance solely to "ageing," and wrote an open essay explaining her response in the weeks before the film's release.

=== Home media ===
Universal Pictures Home Entertainment released Bridget Jones's Baby on DVD and Blu-ray on December 13, 2016.

== Box office ==
Bridget Jones's Baby grossed $212 million worldwide, including $24.1 million in the United States and Canada and $60 million in the United Kingdom, against a budget of $35 million.

The film was released in North America on 16 September 2016 and was projected to gross $12–16 million in its opening weekend from 2,927 theaters. It made $364,000 from its Thursday night previews and $3 million on its first day. In total, the film made $8.2 million in its opening weekend, falling below projections and scoring the lowest opening of the series.

Internationally, where Universal Pictures handled most of the releases, the film fared better and especially in the UK, where the previous two installments registered the biggest grossers. It debuted day-and-date in conjunction with its North American release in 41 countries, including big markets like the UK and Ireland, Russia, Australia, Mexico and Spain in its opening weekend. The film will be released in a total of 62 countries. It scored the biggest opening day in the franchise in the UK, the Netherlands and Latin America including Mexico, Panama and Peru, and had number-one opening days in the UK, Australia, Spain, Denmark, Finland, Hungary, Norway, Poland, Sweden, Croatia, Czech Republic, Slovakia, Slovenia, South Africa and Ukraine. Through Sunday, 18 September, it had an opening weekend of $29.9 million from 39 markets and debuted at number one in 24 of them. It was in second place at the box office, behind A Chinese Odyssey Part Three. It topped the international box office in its second weekend, earning $21.9 million from 47 markets. It recorded the biggest debut in the franchise and had number-one openings in certain markets like Australia ($4.2 million), the Netherlands ($1.9 million), Spain ($1.7 million), Iceland and New Zealand and bowed at second place in France ($3.7 million) and Russia ($1.4 million).

In the United Kingdom and Ireland – the biggest market for the first two films – the film opened on Friday, 16 September, and recorded the biggest comedy/romantic comedy opening day ever, as well as the biggest Working Title and September opening of all time with $4 million at 641 theaters. It went on to score a record breaking £8.11 million ($10.5 million) opening and dominated 57% of the total market share which is the biggest romantic comedy opening weekend ever in the UK; the biggest opening weekend ever for Working Title; and the biggest September launch weekend of all time. Excluding previews, the film has the seventh biggest debut of the year. The film fell just 20% in its second weekend to £6.4 million ($8.3 million) and continued to lead the box office for the third consecutive weekend, despite the influx of a row of competitions. After three straight wins, it was surpassed by The Girl on the Train in its fourth weekend. It broke a number of records including the fastest romantic comedy to earn £30 million, doing so on its seventeenth day (the first film took 31 days and the second film took 24 days). It has so far grossed a total of $54 million there becoming the biggest market outside of North America like its predecessors. Adjusted for inflation it is the lowest-grossing film behind both the films (£73.1 million and £57.8 million respectively).

After 31 days of playing in theaters, the film became the biggest film in the franchise in the United Kingdom with £42.24 million, surpassing the first film's final gross of £42 million. It currently sits as the third biggest film of 2016 behind Finding Dory (£42.25 million) and The Jungle Book (£46.1 million). In Netherlands, it is the highest-grossing Working Title picture of all time with $8.1 million — passing Notting Hill (1999), which held the record for 17 years.

== Reception ==
Bridget Jones's Baby received generally positive reviews from critics. On Rotten Tomatoes, the film has an approval rating of 78%, based on 209 reviews, with an average rating of 6.33/10. The site's critical consensus reads, "Bridget Jones's Baby might be late on arrival, but fans of the series should still find its third installment a bouncing bundle of joy." On Metacritic, which assigns a normalized rating to reviews, the film has a score 59 out of 100, based on 42 critics, indicating "mixed or average" reviews. Audiences polled by CinemaScore gave the film an average grade of "B+" on an A+ to F scale.

== Accolades ==
| Year | Association | Category | Nominee(s) | Result |
|---|---|---|---|---|
| 2017 | ASCAP Film and Television Music Awards | Top Box Office Movie | Craig Armstrong | Won |
| 2017 | Diversity in Media Awards | Movie of the Year | Bridget Jones's Baby | Nominated |
| 2017 | EDA Awards | AWFJ Hall of Shame | Sharon Maguire | Won |
| 2017 | European Film Awards | People's Choice Award for Best European Film | Sharon Maguire | Nominated |
| 2017 | Globes de Cristal Awards | Best Foreign Film | Sharon Maguire | Nominated |

== Sequel ==
In October 2022, Fielding told the Radio Times that a sequel was in the works and would loosely adapt her 2013 novel Mad About the Boy. In April 2024, the sequel was confirmed, with Zellweger and Thompson returning and Hugh Grant reprising his role from the second installment.
