= Bridget Jones's Diary (novel) =

1996 novel by Helen Fielding

- First edition
- Author: Helen Fielding
- Cover artist: Nick Turpin
- Language: English
- Genre: Romantic comedy, chick lit
- Publisher: Picador
- Publication date: 1996
- Publication place: United Kingdom
- Media type: Print (hardback and paperback)
- ISBN: 0-670-88072-8
- OCLC: 38884462
- Dewey Decimal: 823/.914 21
- LC Class: PR6056.I4588 B75 1998
- Followed by: Bridget Jones: The Edge of Reason (1999)

Bridget Jones's Diary is a 1996 novel by Helen Fielding. Written in the form of a personal diary, the novel chronicles a year in the life of Bridget Jones, a thirty-something single working woman living in London. She writes about her career, self-image, vices, family, friends, and romantic relationships.

By 2006, the book had sold over two million copies worldwide. Critics have credited Fielding's novel as the "urtext" of the contemporary chick lit movement. A sequel, The Edge of Reason, was published in 1999, and two further novels, Bridget Jones: Mad About the Boy and Bridget Jones's Baby, were published in 2013 and 2016 respectively. The original novel was adapted into a popular 2001 film; it was later developed into a series with the latest sequel released in 2025.

== Plot ==
The plot is focused on Bridget's love life. She regularly worries about dying being eaten by dogs when her singleness causes her death not to be discovered promptly, an obsession that a USA Today reviewer called "one of [Bridget's] more cheerful daydreams". However, during the course of the year, she becomes involved in two romantic relationships. The first is with her charming and handsome boss Daniel Cleaver, who eventually cheats on Bridget with a younger, more conventionally attractive woman. Bridget's second relationship is with the stuffy human-rights barrister Mark Darcy, whom she initially dislikes when they are reintroduced at a New Year's party where her mother reminds them they were childhood playmates. These two men are connected by more than their relationship with Bridget, as Fielding reveals near the end of the novel.

Bridget not only obsesses about her love life, but also details her various daily struggles with her weight, her over-indulgence in alcohol and cigarettes, and her career. Bridget's friends and family are the supporting characters in her diary. Her friends are there for her unconditionally throughout the novel; they give her advice about her relationships, and support when problems arise. Her friends are essentially her surrogate family in London.

Bridget's parents live outside of the city and, while they play a lesser role than her friends, they are important figures in Bridget's life. Her mother is an overconfident, doting woman who is constantly trying to marry Bridget off to a rich, handsome man; and her father is considerably more down-to-earth, though he is sometimes driven into uncharacteristically unstable states of mind by his wife.

Bridget often visits her parents, as well as her parents' friends, primarily Geoffrey and Una Alconbury; Geoffrey creates a mildly uncomfortable situation for Bridget by insisting she call him "Uncle Geoffrey" despite his propensity for groping her rear end whenever they meet. In these situations, Bridget is often plagued with that perennial question "How's your love life?" and exposed to the eccentricities of middle class British society, manifested in turkey curry buffets and tarts and vicars parties at which the women wear sexually provocative ("tart") costumes, while the men dress as Anglican priests ("vicars").

== Background and similarity to Pride and Prejudice ==
The novel evolved from Helen Fielding's Bridget Jones's Diary columns in The Independent and The Daily Telegraph. Fielding devised the novel with the help of Independent journalist Charles Leadbeater. It is roughly based on Jane Austen's 1813 novel Pride and Prejudice.

In an interview with the BBC, Fielding described writing the novel:

“When I first started writing the Bridget Jones novel I just had a collection of columns and no plot really and simultaneously Pride and Prejudice was going out on the BBC and I was infatuated with it and so I just stole the plot ... and then the book increasingly began to mimic and nick stuff from Pride and Prejudice. But it's a very good plot and I thought Jane Austen wouldn't mind, and anyway she's dead. I think it's a really, really good novel and it's not surprising that it's still popular everywhere after 200 years… it's a really good romantic plot… it's got a fantastic, very modern heroine who's independent minded and funny, perceptive and a bit defiant and feisty… it's full of themes and messages about human nature… It's a masterpiece.”

Bridget Jones's Diary resembles Pride and Prejudice in a number of ways, including:

- The central romance between Bridget Jones and Mark Darcy mirrors that of Elizabeth Bennet and Fitzwilliam Darcy.
- Bridget and Mark have a poor first impression of each other (at the turkey curry buffet), as do Elizabeth and Darcy (at the Meryton dance).
- Bridget and Elizabeth both fall for scoundrels (Daniel Cleaver and Mr Wickham), who are enemies of both Darcys.
- Bridget and Elizabeth both have an overbearing mother and a calm father.
- Each Darcy realises about halfway through the book that they have fallen for Bridget/Elizabeth, but her view only changes when she finds out the truth about Cleaver/Wickham.

== Publication ==
The novel was first published in 1996 by the U.K. publisher; it became an international success. As of 2006, the book had sold over two million copies worldwide. A sequel, Bridget Jones: The Edge of Reason, was published in 1999, and two further novels, Bridget Jones: Mad about the Boy and Bridget Jones's Baby, were published in 2013 and 2016 respectively.

== Awards ==
The novel won the 1998 British Book of the Year, and Tracie Bennett won the 2000 Audie Award for "Solo Female Narration" for her audiobook narration. In 2003, the novel was listed at number 75 on the BBC's survey The Big Read.

== Film adaptation ==
A film adaptation of the novel was released in 2001. The film stars Renée Zellweger (in an Academy Award nominated role) as the eponymous heroine, Hugh Grant as Daniel Cleaver, and Colin Firth as Mark Darcy. It was directed by Sharon Maguire (Helen Fielding's friend who was the inspiration for Shazzer) and the screenplay was written by Fielding, Andrew Davies, and Richard Curtis.

== Musical adaptation ==
A musical version was in the works, with the show due to open in London's West End in 2012, although this never happened. British pop singer Lily Allen wrote the score and lyrics, and Stephen Daldry was said to be directing, joined by his co-worker Peter Darling, who would have served as choreographer. An official cast for the production was never finalised, but workshops for the show did begin with TV actress and star of Legally Blonde the Musical, Sheridan Smith, in the title role. Allen stated in 2014 that while the musical was finished, it was unlikely to see the light of day.

== Critical reception ==
On 5 November 2019, the BBC included Bridget Jones's Diary on its list of the 100 most inspiring novels.
