= Jameson People's Choice Award for Best Actor =

European Film Award – Jameson People's Choice Award – Best European Actor:

== Winners and nominees ==
- 1997 – Javier Bardem
- 1998 – Antonio Banderas (The Mask of Zorro)
- 1999 – Sean Connery (Entrapment)
- 2000 – Ingvar E. Sigurdsson (Angels of the Universe)
- 2001 – Colin Firth (Bridget Jones's Diary)
- 2002 – Javier Camara (Hable Con Ella)
- 2003 – Daniel Brühl (Good Bye Lenin!)
- 2004 – Daniel Brühl (Love in Thoughts)
- 2005 – Orlando Bloom (Kingdom Of Heaven)
