= Bridget Jones: The Edge of Reason (novel) =

1999 novel by Helen Fielding

- First edition
- Author: Helen Fielding
- Language: English
- Genre: Comedy novel, chick lit
- Publisher: Picador
- Publication date: 1999 novel
- Publication place: United Kingdom
- Media type: Print (Hardback & Paperback)
- ISBN: 0-670-89296-3
- OCLC: 43185907
- Dewey Decimal: 823/.914 21
- LC Class: PR6056.I4588 B76 2000
- Preceded by: Bridget Jones's Diary
- Followed by: Bridget Jones: Mad About the Boy

Bridget Jones: The Edge of Reason is a 1999 novel by Helen Fielding, a sequel to her popular Bridget Jones' Diary. It chronicles Bridget Jones's adventures after she begins to suspect that her boyfriend, Mark Darcy, is falling for a rich young solicitor, Rebecca, who works with him. The comic novel follows the characteristic ups and downs of the self-proclaimed singleton's first real relationship in several years. It also involves misunderstandings, work mishaps, and an adventure in Southeast Asia involving planted drugs and Madonna songs.

In 2004, a film adaptation was released.

Two further novels, Bridget Jones: Mad about the Boy and Bridget Jones's Baby, were published in 2013 and 2016 respectively.

== Parallels to Persuasion ==
Fielding has said that the first Bridget Jones story was based on the Jane Austen novel Pride and Prejudice.

The Edge of Reason has parallels to the Austen novel Persuasion, in which the main character is persuaded by her friends to break off her relationship with her "true love". Again, Fielding borrows a name from Austen: Giles Benwick is named for Captain Benwick. She also reworks several scenes in Persuasion: for example, Rebecca, Bridget's rival for Mark's affection, dives into a shallow river and hurts her foot, a mirror of the incident in Persuasion when Louisa, Anne's rival, falls on her head at Lyme. In both cases, the protagonist (Anne/Bridget) overhears Mark/Captain Wentworth (Anne's lost love) praising Rebecca/Louisa for being "resolute" - the very trait that contributed to the accident. Then, when Bridget attends her goddaughter Constance's birthday party, Darcy rescues her from a boy who is determined to climb onto her back; in Persuasion, Wentworth does the same thing, in the same manner, for Anne. At Bridget's mother's Book Club poetry reading, Mark overhears Bridget commenting that women remain fixated on men who have forgotten them, and is moved to write her a secret note expressing his continuing regard (which he then fails to give to her due to a mix-up). This, with a happier immediate outcome, also happens in Persuasion, when Wentworth overhears Anne making a similar observation about "women's constancy", and writes her a proposal which he gets to her by stealth. Later in the Fielding novel, when Giles and Rebecca become romantically involved, Fielding parodies Austen's description of Captain Benwick and Louisa having fallen in love over poetry, commenting that Giles and Rebecca "fell in love over self-help books".

Much is made of Bridget's fascination with the BBC television adaptation of Pride and Prejudice and Colin Firth, the actor who played Mr. Darcy. Bridget even meets Colin Firth and interviews him for a newspaper article. As a self-referential in-joke, Colin Firth plays Mark Darcy in the Bridget Jones movies.

== Possible inspiration ==
British teacher Sandra Gregory, who was imprisoned for four years in Thailand after being caught smuggling heroin, said the scenes involving the Thai prison were probably inspired by her experience since Fielding knew her parents' neighbors and had presumably spoken to them.

== Reception ==
Reviewing the novel in The Guardian, Alex Clark described Bridget Jones, a "humorous zeitgeisty diarist", as a "guilty pleasure". Stephanie Merritt of The Observer said "Bridget is probably the most successful comic creation of this decade."

Actress Tracie Bennett won an Audie Award for Comedy Best Actress for her audiobook narrations of both this novel and its predecessor.
