= Bridget Jones: The Edge of Reason =

2004 film by Beeban Kidron

- UK theatrical release poster
- Directed by: Beeban Kidron
- Screenplay by: Andrew Davies; Helen Fielding; Richard Curtis; Adam Brooks
- Based on: Bridget Jones: The Edge of Reason by Helen Fielding
- Produced by: Tim Bevan; Eric Fellner; Jonathan Cavendish
- Starring: Renée Zellweger; Hugh Grant; Colin Firth; Jim Broadbent; Gemma Jones
- Cinematography: Adrian Biddle
- Edited by: Greg Hayden
- Music by: Harry Gregson-Williams
- Production companies: Miramax Films; StudioCanal; Working Title Films; Little Bird
- Distributed by: Mars Distribution (France); Universal Pictures (International) (Note: Distributed through United International Pictures outside United States and Canada.)
- Release dates: 28 October 2004 (State Theatre); 12 November 2004 (United Kingdom and United States); 8 December 2004 (France)
- Running time: 108 minutes
- Countries: France; United Kingdom; United States
- Language: English
- Budget: $40–50 million
- Box office: $265.1 million

Bridget Jones: The Edge of Reason is a 2004 romantic comedy film directed by Beeban Kidron from a screenplay by Andrew Davies, Helen Fielding, Richard Curtis, and Adam Brooks. It is the sequel to Bridget Jones's Diary (2001) and the second installment in the Bridget Jones film series The film is based on the 1999 novel of the same name by Fielding. It stars Renée Zellweger, Hugh Grant, Colin Firth, Jim Broadbent, and Gemma Jones, and follows title character Bridget Jones (Zellweger), who experiences relationship troubles with boyfriend Mark Darcy (Firth) and becomes co-host of a television show with ex-boyfriend Daniel Cleaver (Grant).

Bridget Jones: The Edge of Reason premiered at the State Theatre in Sydney, Australia on 28 October 2004 and was released in the United Kingdom and the United States on 12 November. Despite mixed-to-negative reviews from critics, the film was a box office success, grossing over $265 million worldwide against a production budget of $40–50 million. Zellweger received a nomination for the Golden Globe Award for Best Performance by an Actress in a Motion Picture – Comedy or Musical for her performance at the 62nd Golden Globe Awards.

Two sequels, Bridget Jones's Baby and Bridget Jones: Mad About the Boy, were released in 2016 and 2025, respectively.

== Plot ==
Bridget Jones is ecstatic about her new relationship with Mark Darcy. However, her confidence is shattered when she meets Mark's assistant, the younger, beautiful, Rebecca Gillies. Working on morning TV show Sit-Up Britain, Bridget is offered a position alongside her ex-boyfriend, Daniel Cleaver, in a new travel series. She declares Daniel is a "deceitful, sexist, disgusting specimen of humanity", but eventually agrees, despite her friends' misgivings.

Bridget is delighted when Mark invites her to the Law Council dinner, believing he will propose afterwards. However, a series of mishaps make the evening a debacle. These culminate in the team trivia quiz: Bridget makes a critical error on a question about Madonna, which Rebecca wins, leaving Bridget thoroughly deflated.

Bridget and Mark argue and she stomps off. He goes to her apartment, apologises, and for the first time he says he loves her. He invites her on a ski-break in Lech, Austria. On the slopes, Bridget learns Rebecca is also there with a few other colleagues. Bridget has a pregnancy scare, but after an argument over the upbringing and education of their hypothetical children, a pregnancy test proves negative. Returning home, Bridget and Mark attend a lunch with their parents, where Bridget is hurt by Mark's dismissal of their questions about the prospect of marriage.

Overhearing a message from Rebecca on Mark's answering machine, Bridget dissects it with her friends, who advise her to confront him. When she does, he refuses to "dignify the question with an answer", so she breaks up with him. She travels to Thailand with Shazza and Daniel to film The Smooth Guide. Bridget and Daniel visit several exotic locations and, after she unintentionally consumes psilocybin mushrooms, they flirtily reconnect, but her trust in him dissipates again when a Thai prostitute he ordered earlier appears, and she realises he has not changed.

Shazza has a fling with the much younger Jed, who gives her a fertility snake bowl as a gift to take back to England, which ends up in Bridget's bag. When security dogs at the airport detect a large stash of cocaine inside it, Bridget is arrested and locked up in a prison cell with dozens of Thai women. Feeling low and scared, but glad at the friendliness of the inmates, she shares relationship advice with them and teaches them to sing and dance to Madonna's "Like a Virgin".

Mark comes to tell Bridget that her release is imminent. After confirming Jed as the true perpetrator and that she "spent the night" with Daniel, he declares her sex life does not interest him; Bridget does not correct his presumption, Mark departs, leaving her sure he no longer loves her. Back in London, Mark confronts Daniel for abandoning Bridget in Thailand, and they fight in a fountain. Daniel swears off her for good and says, "If you're so obsessed with Bridget Jones, why don't you just marry her?"

Bridget arrives at Heathrow Airport as an international human rights celebrity, greeted by her parents, who have been busy planning their vow renewal ceremony. At home, Bridget is surprised when her friends tell her that Mark personally tracked down the drug trafficker Jed, secured his custody and extradition, and forced him to admit her innocence.

Hopeful that Mark still loves her, Bridget rushes to his house. Finding Rebecca there, she assumes she is romantically involved with him, but Rebecca tells her that she is lesbian and her feelings are for Bridget and kisses her. Though flattered, Bridget politely turns her down. Bridget confronts Mark at his legal chambers, asking him to give her another chance. He proposes and she accepts. When Bridget's parents renew their vows, she catches the bouquet.

== Cast ==
- Renée Zellweger as Bridget Jones
- Hugh Grant as Daniel Cleaver
- Colin Firth as Mark Darcy
- Jim Broadbent as Mr. Colin Jones
- Gemma Jones as Mrs. Pamela Jones
- Jacinda Barrett as Rebecca Gillies
- James Callis as Tom
- Shirley Henderson as Jude
- Sally Phillips as Sharon "Shazza"
- Neil Pearson as Richard Finch
- Jessica Stevenson as Magda
- Celia Imrie as Una Alconbury
- James Faulkner as Uncle Geoffrey
- Donald Douglas as Admiral Darcy
- Shirley Dixon as Mrs. Darcy
- David Verrey as Giles
- Jeremy Paxman as himself
- Ian McNeice as Quizmaster
- Paul Nicholls as Jed
- Lucy Robinson as Janey
- Wolf Kahler as Commentator
- Catherine Russell as Camilla
- Alex Jennings as Horatio
- Hu Ting-ting as Thai prostitute
- Jason Watkins as Charlie Parker-Knowles
- Vee Vimolmal as Phrao
- Patrick Baladi as Flight attendant
- Neil Dudgeon as Taxi driver
- Pui Fan Lee and Melissa Ashworth as Thai jail girls

== Production ==
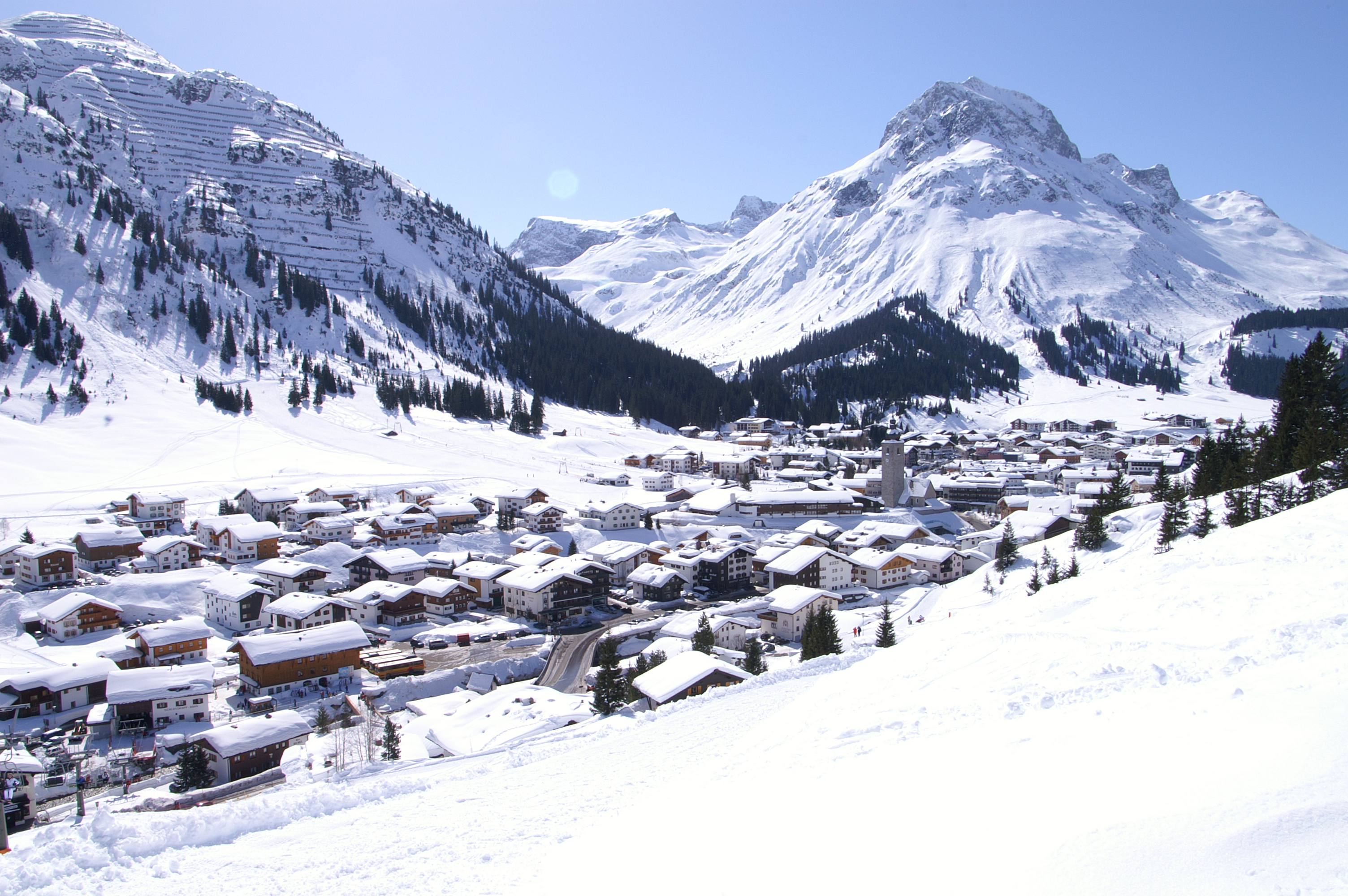
The skiing scenes took place in Lech, western Austria

Principal photography began on 6 October 2003 and concluded on 15 February 2004.

Filming took place in Southwark and Primrose Hill. The skiing scenes took place in Lech, western Austria.

During the fight scene between Daniel and Mark at the "Serpentine Gallery in Kensington Gardens" (actually filmed in the Italian Gardens near Lancaster Gate), it was for the most part not choreographed; instead, the actors were simply asked to fight each other any way they could. At one point in the film (where Bridget and Shazzer are at the Thai airport), Bridget indulges in a fantasy of Mark coming out of water in a wet white shirt, just like Colin Firth did in the 1995 BBC version of Pride and Prejudice. The poem that Daniel quotes from while passing Ko Panyi is the story of "Phra Aphai Mani" by Sunthorn Phu.

One of the more significant differences between the novel and the film is that the film makes no mention of Bridget's fascination with the BBC television version of Jane Austen's Pride and Prejudice (Colin Firth starred in that production).

Sandra Gregory stated that the scenes involving the Thai prison probably received inspiration from her incident since Helen Fielding knew the next door neighbours of her parents and presumably would have talked to them.

== Release ==
=== Box office ===
Bridget Jones: The Edge of Reason grossed US$40.2 million domestically and $224.9 million in other territories, for a worldwide total of $265.1 million, against a production budget reported as between $40-$50 million. Starting its first week with a limited release (530 theatres) on 12 November 2004, it opened at No. 4, its peak during its four consecutive weeks (starting wide release in its second week) in the Top 10 at the domestic box office.

=== Critical response ===
On the review aggregator website Rotten Tomatoes, 27% of 157 critics' reviews are positive, with an average rating of 4.7/10. The website's consensus reads: "Edge of Reason is a predictable continuation to the Bridget Jones story, with too much slapstick and silliness." Metacritic, which uses a weighted average, assigned the film a score of 44 out of 100, based on 37 critics, indicating "mixed or average" reviews.

The film was voted Evening Standard Readers' Film of 2004 and was in the shortlist for the Orange Film of the Year award at the British Academy Film Awards. Zellweger gained a Golden Globe nomination for Best Performance by an Actress in a Motion Picture – Comedy or Musical and the People's Choice Award as Favorite Leading Lady of 2005.

== Sequel ==
In July 2009, the BBC reported that a third film was in the early stages of production. On 1 March 2011 it was reported that both Renée Zellweger and Colin Firth had shown interest in reprising their roles. An announcement was made on 11 August 2011 that a third film was greenlit by Universal Pictures, Miramax and Working Title.

In April 2013, Colin Firth told the Chicago Sun-Times that:

Unfortunately, it might be a bit of a long wait. I wouldn't say that it's completely dead in the water, but the way it's going, you might be seeing Bridget Jones's granddaughter's story being told by the time we get there.

In an interview with Cosmopolitan UK in October 2014, Hugh Grant mentioned an existing script for a sequel, however also expressed his dislike for it and that he would not star in a third film. Filming officially began on 2 October 2015. The movie opened on 16 September 2016.

== Home media ==
Unlike its predecessor, (Note: Which was released by Miramax Home Entertainment.) the film was released on DVD and VHS on 22 March 2005 by Universal Studios Home Entertainment with a variety of bonus features.

== Soundtrack ==
Bridget Jones: The Edge of Reason (The Original Soundtrack)

Soundtrack album by Various artists
- Released: 19 November 2004
- Genre: Mixed
- Label: Geffen
- Producer: Nick Angel

Singles from Bridget Jones: The Edge of Reason (The Original Soundtrack)
- 1. "Stop" Released: 1 November 2004

English singer Jamelia covered "Stop", originally by Sam Brown, for the film.

"Stop" was released as a double A-side with the song "DJ" on 1 November 2004. The single peaked at number nine on the UK Singles Chart and became Jamelia's fourth consecutive top-10 entry, spending 12 weeks on the chart. It also became her fourth consecutive top-40 single in Australia, peaking at number 37.

Uncut magazine gave the album three out of five stars, saying that "[I]ts quality control is close to impeccable." Allmusic called it "a generally enjoyable, if slick, musical counterpart to the film's frothy romantic shenanigans."

=== Track listing ===
1. "Your Love Is King" by Will Young – 4:05
2. "Stop" by Jamelia – 3:37
3. "Can't Get You Out of My Head" by Kylie Minogue – 3:49
4. "Super Duper Love" by Joss Stone – 3:50
5. "Sorry Seems to Be the Hardest Word" by Mary J. Blige – 3:44
6. "Misunderstood" by Robbie Williams – 4:00
7. "Everlasting Love" by Jamie Cullum – 3:22
8. "You're the First, the Last, My Everything" by Barry White – 3:24
9. "Crazy in Love" by Beyoncé featuring Jay Z –3:56
10. "I Eat Dinner (When The Hunger's Gone)" by Rufus Wainwright featuring Dido – 5:39
11. "I'm Not In Love" by 10cc – 6:02
12. "Nobody Does It Better" by Carly Simon – 3:44
13. "Loaded" by Primal Scream – 4:32
14. "Will You Still Love Me Tomorrow?" by Amy Winehouse – 3:32
15. "Lovin' You" by Minnie Riperton – 3:46
16. "Calling" by Leona Naess – 3:42
17. "We'll Be Together" by Sting and Annie Lennox – 3:53
18. "Bridget's Theme" by Harry Gregson-Williams – 2:11

=== Charts ===
Chart (2004-2005)	Peak position
Australian Albums (ARIA)	8
Austrian Albums (Ö3 Austria)	11
Belgian Albums (Ultratop Flanders)	62
Belgian Albums (Ultratop Wallonia)	62
Canadian Albums (Billboard)	35
Dutch Albums (Album Top 100)	38
French Albums (SNEP)	37
German Albums (Offizielle Top 100)	25
Hungarian Albums (MAHASZ)	36
New Zealand Albums (RMNZ)	7
Spanish Albums (Promusicae)	33
Swiss Albums (Schweizer Hitparade)	24
US Billboard 200	72

=== Certifications ===
Region	Certification	Certified units/sales
Australia (ARIA)	Platinum	70,000^{^}
Ireland (IRMA)	2× Platinum	30,000^{^}
New Zealand (RMNZ)	Platinum	15,000^{^}
United Kingdom (BPI)	2× Platinum	600,000^{^}
Summaries
Europe (IFPI)	Platinum	1,000,000^{*}
^{*} Sales figures based on certification alone.^{^} Shipments figures based on certification alone.
