= Bridget Jones: Mad About the Boy =

2025 film by Michael Morris

- Theatrical release poster
- Directed by: Michael Morris
- Screenplay by: Helen Fielding; Dan Mazer; Abi Morgan
- Based on: Bridget Jones: Mad About the Boy by Helen Fielding
- Produced by: Tim Bevan; Eric Fellner; Jo Wallett
- Starring: Renée Zellweger; Chiwetel Ejiofor; Leo Woodall; Jim Broadbent; Colin Firth; Hugh Grant
- Cinematography: Suzie Lavelle
- Edited by: Mark Day
- Music by: Dustin O'Halloran
- Production companies: StudioCanal; Miramax; Working Title Films
- Distributed by: Universal Pictures (international); StudioCanal (France)
- Release dates: 12 February 2025 (France); 13 February 2025 (United Kingdom and United States)
- Running time: 125 minutes
- Countries: France; United Kingdom; United States
- Language: English
- Budget: $50 million
- Box office: $140.4 million

Bridget Jones: Mad About the Boy is a 2025 romantic comedy film directed by Michael Morris from a screenplay by Helen Fielding, Dan Mazer and Abi Morgan. It is the fourth in the Bridget Jones film series, and is based on the 2013 novel by Fielding. Renée Zellweger, Hugh Grant and Colin Firth reprise their roles from the previous films, with Chiwetel Ejiofor and Leo Woodall joining the cast.

In the film, Bridget Jones, now a widowed single mother, navigates the challenges of parenthood, work, and modern dating with the support of her friends, family, and former partner, Daniel Cleaver. As she re-enters the dating world, she finds herself pursued by a younger man while also forming an unexpected connection with her son's science teacher.

Bridget Jones: Mad About the Boy was released in cinemas in France on 12 February 2025 by StudioCanal and in the United Kingdom on 13 February by Universal Pictures. In the United States, the film was released on Peacock on 13 February. It received positive reviews from critics and grossed $140 million against a budget of $50 million. It was nominated for Outstanding Television Movie at the 77th Primetime Creative Arts Emmy Awards and won Best Movie Made for Television at the 31st Critics' Choice Awards.

== Plot ==
Bridget Jones, now the mother of school-aged Billy and Mabel, prepares to go out for the first time in a long time. While Daniel Cleaver babysits her children, Bridget attends the celebration of life held for her late husband, Mark Darcy, who was killed four years earlier while on a humanitarian mission in Sudan. She spends the torturous evening accepting condolences and being pressured to start dating again.

Billy and Mabel are still awake when Bridget arrives home. Mabel observes a white owl that sits outside their window every night. Bridget reminisces about Mark singing to the children, and imagines seeing him do so. She then contemplates the often-contradictory advice and suggestions her friends and family offer.

Bridget recalls her father Colin's dying wish that she live life fully. Coupling this with Dr Rawlings's suggestion to return to work, Bridget is motivated to make a fresh start. After Miranda calls for suggestions on a live interview for her women's program, Bridget contacts Richard and again becomes a show producer.

Just as Bridget decides to re-enter the dating world, she meets 29-year-old park ranger Roxster, who pursues her on Tinder, and, after days of texting, they arrange a date. Bridget's friends offer advice before they go out. Bridget and Roxster's relationship evolves over the summer, with Mabel quickly labelling him as their "new daddy". Billy, still struggling to cope with his father's death, is less enthusiastic.

Bridget is invited to Billy's class to discuss her job as a television producer. To demonstrate, she chooses a girl to act as producer, while she assumes the role as the presenter and interviews science teacher Scott Walliker. A seemingly simple explanation about an insect's life cycle turns more serious as Bridget asks questions about whether all living creatures have souls.

At a birthday party for Bridget's colleague, Roxster makes a grand entrance. As they enjoy the evening, Roxster makes an offhand comment about wishing for a time machine. The next morning, Bridget awakens to find him gone. He subsequently ghosts her.

Daniel, hospitalised due to a heart scare, contacts Bridget, feeling she is the only person who might care about him. He reflects on how alone he is, mentioning how he has not seen his teenage son for over a decade. Bridget, who deeply misses her deceased father, encourages Daniel to see his son.

Roxster shows up at the studio to apologise to Bridget. He admits to having panicked, but declares that he is now ready to commit to her and the children. She then expresses the wish for a time machine so he could catch up, but she turns him down. That evening, after once again looking over her articles and memorabilia of Mark, she writes a heartfelt message to him. On Mark's birthday, Bridget, Billy and Mabel go to a park to release balloons with their messages to him attached.

On a school trip to the Lake District, Bridget chats with Scott. He says he always expected to have children, but it never happened. When Bridget leaves to soothe a child, Billy confides to Scott that he fears forgetting his father. Scott assures him that his father is a part of him, so will never be fully gone.

At the school winter holiday pageant, Billy sings "I'd Do Anything" as a tribute to his father. Bridget knows Mark would have been proud. She thanks Scott for helping her family heal, and invites him to join them and her friends at a pub afterwards. Arriving at the pub, Scott turns around to leave, but Bridget catches him outside. He confesses he is drawn to her, much like Newton's third law of being equal but opposite, before Bridget kisses him.

One year later, Bridget throws a New Year's Eve at her house for her family and friends, including Scott and Daniel, who has reunited with his 16-year-old son Enzo. After the party, as Bridget tucks the children into bed, they observe as the owl flies away, which Scott also witnesses downstairs. Scott helps Bridget unzip her dress, and they kiss.

== Cast ==
- Renée Zellweger as Bridget Jones
- Chiwetel Ejiofor as Scott Walliker, a teacher at Bridget's children's school
- Leo Woodall as Roxster McDuff, Bridget's younger new love interest
- Jim Broadbent as Colin Jones, Bridget's father
- Gemma Jones as Pamela Jones, Bridget's mother
- Colin Firth as Mark Darcy, Bridget's late husband
- Hugh Grant as Daniel Cleaver, Bridget's ex-boyfriend
- James Callis as Tom
- Shirley Henderson as Jude
- Sally Phillips as Sharon "Shazzer"
- Sarah Solemani as Miranda, Bridget's friend and Better Woman's anchorwoman
- Celia Imrie as Una Alconbury
- Leila Farzad as Nicolette
- Josette Simon as Talitha, Miranda's co-host on Better Woman
- Nico Parker as Chloe, Bridget's children's nanny
- Neil Pearson as Richard Finch
- Dolly Wells as Woney
- Claire Skinner as Magda
- Casper Knopf as Billy Darcy, Bridget & Mark's son
- Mila Jankovic as Mabel Darcy, Bridget & Mark's daughter
- Ian Midlane as Paul
- Emma Thompson as Dr Rawlings
- Isla Fisher as Rebecca, Bridget's new neighbour
- Joanna Scanlan as Cathy
- Alessandro Bedetti as Enzo Cleaver, Daniel's son

In addition, UK broadcast journalists Gillian Joseph, Gamal Fahnbulleh, Daniel Heard and Maryam Moshiri have cameo appearances as themselves, in a montage of news reports in the film.

== Production ==
In October 2022, novelist Helen Fielding responded to reports about a fourth film in the Bridget Jones film series, telling the Radio Times that a sequel to Bridget Jones's Baby (2016) was in the works. In April 2024, a fourth film in the film series based on Fielding's third book in the Bridget Jones series, Bridget Jones: Mad About the Boy (2013), was confirmed, with Renée Zellweger, Hugh Grant and Emma Thompson set to be reprise their roles from previous instalments, with Chiwetel Ejiofor and Leo Woodall joining the cast. It was also reported that Michael Morris would direct the film from a script by Fielding with further contributions from Abi Morgan and Dan Mazer, with Tim Bevan, Eric Fellner and Jo Wallett producing under the Working Title Films banner. As with Bridget Jones: The Edge of Reason (2004) and Bridget Jones's Baby (2016), Miramax was confirmed to co-finance the film.

In May 2024, Isla Fisher, Josette Simon, Nico Parker, and Leila Farzad joined the cast of the film, with Jim Broadbent, Gemma Jones, Sarah Solemani, Sally Phillips, Shirley Henderson, James Callis and Celia Imrie reprising their roles from the previous films. Principal photography began on 10 May 2024 at the Sky Studios Elstree in London and wrapped on 8 August.

== Soundtrack ==
The score for Bridget Jones: Mad About the Boy was composed by American pianist Dustin O'Halloran. His original music was released as the film's official soundtrack on 14 February 2025 through Back Lot Music, a division of Universal Studios Music. The same day, Universal Music Recordings issued Bridget Jones's Diary: The Mixtape, a compilation of selected songs from across the Bridget Jones film franchise that was produced in collaboration with the franchise's music executive producer, Nick Angel. Apart from songs from the first three Bridget Jones films, a selection of songs from Mad About the Boy were also featured, including recordings from Jessie Ware, Al Green, Raye, and Dinah Washington as well as Olivia Dean's original song "It Isn't Perfect But It Might Be", which plays over the film's ending credits and served as the soundtrack's lead single. The song has reached number 36 on the UK Singles Chart, while the soundtrack peaked at number 64 on the UK Albums Chart.

== Release ==
Bridget Jones: Mad About the Boy began its international rollout on 12 February 2025 in countries such as Belgium, France and Switzerland, with StudioCanal distributing the film in France. On 13 February, the film was released in cinemas in the United Kingdom and Ireland by Universal Pictures and in the United States on the streaming service Peacock.

=== Home media ===
The film was released on Blu-ray and DVD on 13 May 2025 by Universal Pictures Home Entertainment.

== Reception ==
=== Box office ===
Bridget Jones: Mad About the Boy made $35.5 million from 71 countries on its international opening weekend, with the largest markets being the United Kingdom and Ireland ($14.8 million), Australia ($3.3 million), and France ($3.3 million). By its second weekend, the film had a global gross of $67.6 million, including $34.5 million in the UK, $6 million in Australia, $4.2 million in Poland, $3.3 million in the Netherlands, and $1.9 million in Spain.

=== Critical response ===
On the review aggregator website Rotten Tomatoes, 88% of 129 critics' reviews are positive, with an average rating of 7.1/10. The website's consensus reads: "A bittersweet romp about new beginnings with another sparkling turn by Renée Zellweger, Mad About the Boy gracefully closes the book on Bridget Jones' diary." Metacritic, which uses a weighted average, assigned the film a score of 72 out of 100, based on 27 critics, indicating "generally favorable" reviews.

=== Accolades ===
Accolades received by Bridget Jones: Mad About the Boy
Award	Date of ceremony	Category	Recipient(s)	Result	Ref.
Fidos Award	23 February 2025	Rom Com Rover	Bridget Jones: Mad About the Boy	Won	
Gotham TV Awards	2 June 2025	Outstanding Original Film, Broadcast, or Streaming	Michael Morris, director; Tim Bevan, Eric Fellner, Jo Wallett, producers	Nominated	
Gotham TV Awards	2 June 2025	Outstanding Performance in an Original Film	Renée Zellweger	Nominated	
Astra TV Awards	11 June 2025	Best TV Movie	Bridget Jones: Mad About the Boy	Nominated	
Astra TV Awards	11 June 2025	Best Cast Ensemble in a Limited Series or TV Movie	Bridget Jones: Mad About the Boy	Nominated	
Astra TV Awards	11 June 2025	Best Actress in a Limited Series or TV Movie	Renée Zellweger	Nominated	
Astra TV Awards	11 June 2025	Best Supporting Actor in a Limited Series or TV Movie	Hugh Grant	Nominated	
National Film Awards UK	2 July 2025	Best Actress	Renée Zellweger	Nominated	
National Film Awards UK	2 July 2025	Best Supporting Actor	Chiwetel Ejiofor	Nominated	
National Film Awards UK	2 July 2025	Best Supporting Actor	Hugh Grant	Nominated	
National Film Awards UK	2 July 2025	Outstanding Performance	Hugh Grant	Nominated	
National Film Awards UK	2 July 2025	Best Supporting Actress	Isla Fisher	Nominated	
National Film Awards UK	2 July 2025	Best Supporting Actress	Emma Thompson	Won	
National Film Awards UK	2 July 2025	Best Comedy	Bridget Jones: Mad About the Boy	Nominated	
National Film Awards UK	2 July 2025	Best Drama	Bridget Jones: Mad About the Boy	Nominated	
National Film Awards UK	2 July 2025	Best Feature Film	Bridget Jones: Mad About the Boy	Nominated	
National Film Awards UK	2 July 2025	Best International Film	Bridget Jones: Mad About the Boy	Won	
National Film Awards UK	2 July 2025	Best Screenplay	Helen Fielding, Dan Mazer, and Abi Morgan	Nominated	
National Film Awards UK	2 July 2025	Best Director	Michael Morris	Nominated	
Dorian Awards	18 July 2025	Best TV Movie or Miniseries	Bridget Jones: Mad About the Boy	Nominated	
Gold Derby TV Awards	18 August 2025	Best TV Movie	Bridget Jones: Mad About the Boy	Nominated	
Gold Derby TV Awards	18 August 2025	Best Limited Series or TV Movie Actress	Renée Zellweger	Nominated	
Gold Derby TV Awards	18 August 2025	Best Limited Series or TV Movie Supporting Actor	Hugh Grant	Nominated	
Online Film & Television Association Awards	31 August 2025	Best Motion Picture	Bridget Jones: Mad About the Boy	Nominated	
Primetime Creative Arts Emmy Awards	6 September 2025	Outstanding Television Movie	Helen Fielding, Renée Zellweger, Amelia Granger, Sarah-Jane Wright, executive producers; Tim Bevan, Eric Fellner, Jo Wallett, produced by	Nominated	
Hollywood Music in Media Awards	19 November 2025	Best Music Supervision – Film	Nick Angel	Won	
Hollywood Music in Media Awards	19 November 2025	Best Original Score – TV or Streamed Movie	Dustin O'Halloran	Won	
Florida Film Critics Circle	19 December 2025	Best Actress	Renée Zellweger	Nominated	
Critics' Choice Awards	4 January 2026	Best Movie Made for Television	Bridget Jones: Mad About the Boy	Won	
Critics' Choice Awards	4 January 2026	Best Actress in a Limited Series or Movie Made for Television	Renée Zellweger	Nominated	
Golden Tomato Awards	13 January 2026	Best Romance Movie	Bridget Jones: Mad About the Boy	Nominated	
Directors Guild of America Awards	7 February 2026	Outstanding Directorial Achievement in Movies for Television	Michael Morris	Nominated	
Casting Directors' Guild Awards	12 February 2026	Best Casting in Film	Lucy Bevan, casting director; Olivia Grant, co-casting director; Lucy Downes, associate casting director	Nominated	
British Academy Film Awards	22 February 2026	Outstanding British Film	Michael Morris, Tim Bevan, Eric Fellner, Jo Wallett, Helen Fielding, Dan Mazer, and Abi Morgan	Nominated	
Artios Awards	26 February 2026	Outstanding Achievement in Casting – Film, First Released for Television or Streaming	Lucy Bevan, Olivia Grant, casting directors; Lucy Downes, associate casting director	Won	
Guild of Music Supervisors Awards	28 February 2026	Best Music Supervision in a Non-Theatrically Released Film	Nick Angel	Nominated	
Guild of Music Supervisors Awards	28 February 2026	Best Song Written and/or Recorded for Film	"It Isn't Perfect But It Might Be" – Olivia Dean, Matthew Hales, songwriters; Olivia Dean, performer; Nick Angel, music supervisor	Nominated	
Producers Guild of America Awards	28 February 2026	Outstanding Producer of Streamed or Televised Motion Pictures	Tim Bevan, Eric Fellner, and Jo Wallett	Nominated	
