= Bridget Jones =

- First appearance: Bridget Jones's Diary
- Last appearance: Bridget Jones: Mad About the Boy
- Created by: Helen Fielding
- Portrayed by: Renée Zellweger

In-universe information
- Full name: Bridget Rose Jones
- Gender: Female
- Occupation: TV producer and reporter
- Family: Colin Jones (father); Pamela Jones (mother)
- Spouse: Mark Darcy
- Children: William "Billy" Darcy; Mabel Darcy
- Nationality: British
- Residence: London

Bridget Rose Jones is a fictional character created by British writer Helen Fielding. Jones first appeared in Fielding's Bridget Jones's Diary column in The Independent in 1995, which did not carry any byline. Thus, it seemed to be an actual personal diary chronicling the life of Jones as a thirtysomething single woman in London as she tries to make sense of life, love, and relationships with the help of a surrogate "urban family" of friends in the 1990s. The column was, in fact, a lampoon of women's obsession with love, marriage and romance as well as women's magazines such as Cosmopolitan and wider social trends in Britain at the time. Fielding published the novelisation of the column in 1996, followed by a sequel in 1999 called The Edge of Reason.

Both novels were adapted for film in 2001 and 2004, starring Renée Zellweger as Bridget Jones, and Hugh Grant and Colin Firth as the men in her life: Daniel Cleaver and Mark Darcy, respectively. After Fielding had ceased to work for The Daily Telegraph in late 1998, the feature began again in The Independent on 4 August 2005 and finished in June 2006. Helen Fielding released a third novel in 2013 (Bridget Jones: Mad About the Boy, which is set 14 years after the events of the second novel), and a fourth in 2016 (Bridget Jones's Baby: The Diaries, where Bridget finds herself unexpectedly pregnant without being certain who the father is).

Bridget Jones is hailed as a British cultural icon and was named on the 2016 Woman's Hour Power List as one of seven women judged to have had the biggest impact on women's lives over the past 70 years.

== Plot summary ==
=== Original column and novelizations ===
The plot of the first novel is loosely based on Pride and Prejudice.

Jones is a Bangor University graduate. She is a 34-year-old (32 in the first film adaptation) single woman whose life is a satirized version of the stereotypical single London 30-something in the 1990s and very unlucky in love. She has some bad habits—smoking and drinking—but she annually writes her New Year's resolutions in her diary, determined to stop smoking, drink no more than 14 alcohol units a week, and eat more "pulses" and try her best to lose weight.

In the two novels and screen adaptations, Bridget's mother is bored with her life as a housewife in the country and leaves Bridget's father. Bridget repeatedly flirts with her boss, Daniel Cleaver. A successful barrister named Mark Darcy also keeps popping into Bridget's life, being extremely awkward, and sometimes coming off a bit rude. After Bridget and Mark reach an understanding of each other and find a sort of happiness together, she gains some self-confidence and dramatically cuts down on her alcohol and cigarette consumption. However, Bridget's obsession with self-help books plus several misunderstandings cannot keep the couple together forever.

=== Return to the Independent ===
The new Independent column was set in the then-present day of 2005 and 2006, with references being made to events such as the River Thames whale, and has dropped some of the motifs of the original diary, particularly the alcohol unit and calorie counts. Despite the time advance, Cleaver and Darcy were still the two men in Jones' life ("I'm not sleeping with them both at once," she explains later to her friend Shazza. "I accidentally slept with each of them separately"), and the plot line launched into a pregnancy. As Fielding said, "she's heading in a different direction."

The column is continued into 2006. In the last entry, Bridget Jones gave birth to a baby boy, fathered by Daniel Cleaver, and moved in with him. However, Mark was not entirely out of the picture, as he previously suggested that he would like to adopt the child. The column finished with the note, "Bridget is giving every attention to the care of her newborn son – and is too busy to keep up her Diary for the time being."

== History ==
=== Original column ===
In the mid-1990s, Charles Leadbeater, at the time the features editor of the English newspaper The Independent, offered Helen Fielding, then a journalist on The Independent on Sunday, a weekly column about urban life in London designed to appeal to young professional women. Fielding accepted and Bridget Jones was born on 28 February 1995. The instantaneous popularity of the columns led to the publication of the first book, Bridget Jones's Diary, in 1996.

The column appeared regularly every Wednesday on the pages of The Independent for almost three years: the last one was published on 10 September 1997. A couple of months later, on 15 November 1997, Helen Fielding resumed her weekly diary in The Daily Telegraph. Fielding ceased to work for The Daily Telegraph on 19 December 1998.

==== Novelizations ====
The column was made into a novel in 1996, Bridget Jones's Diary. The plot is very loosely based on Pride and Prejudice by Jane Austen. Critics assert that Fielding's book arguably began the popular fiction movement known as chick lit. The second book, The Edge of Reason, was published on 1998, and was based on the plot of another of Austen's novels, Persuasion.

Fielding named the character of Mark Darcy after the Pride and Prejudice character Fitzwilliam Darcy and described him exactly like Colin Firth, who played Mr Darcy in the 1995 BBC adaptation. Mark Darcy was also partly modelled on a friend of Fielding's called Mark Muller, a barrister with chambers in Gray's Inn Square; and the Kurdish revolutionary leader whom Darcy defends in the movie was inspired by a real case of Muller's. The character of Shazzer was reportedly based on Sharon Maguire, who is a friend of Fielding and would become director of the film.

A third book was published in October 2013, titled Bridget Jones: Mad About the Boy. The novel is set in present-day London; Bridget is 51, still keeping a diary, but is also immersed in texting and experimenting with social media. It is revealed in the book that Mark Darcy had died five years earlier and that they have two children, Billy and Mabel, aged seven and five respectively. Publication of the novel was set for "Super Thursday", in preparation for Christmas. However, a mistake occurred in the early book prints which combined sections of the novel with Sir David Jason's autobiography. Vintage explained the error as "a Bridget moment" and recalled the books.

=== Return to The Independent ===
The feature began again in The Independent on 4 August 2005 with a "Sunday 31 July" entry. A book containing the original columns for 1995 was given away with the paper the following Saturday. This relaunch of the column is also printed in the Irish Independent. The International Herald Tribune reviewed the new column rather favourably, commenting that Fielding's satire was in good form.

=== Connections to Pride and Prejudice ===
Helen Fielding (as Bridget Jones) wrote of her love of the 1995 BBC adaptation of Pride and Prejudice in her Bridget Jones's Diary column during the original British broadcast, mentioning her "simple human need for Darcy to get off with Elizabeth" and regarding the couple as her "chosen representatives in the field of shagging, or rather courtship". Fielding loosely reworked the plot of Pride and Prejudice in her 1996 novelization of the column, naming Bridget's uptight love interest "Mark Darcy" and describing him exactly like Colin Firth. Following a first meeting with Firth during his filming of Fever Pitch in 1996, Fielding asked him to collaborate in what would become an eight-page interview between Bridget Jones and Firth in her 1999 sequel novel, Bridget Jones: The Edge of Reason. Conducting the real interview with Firth in Rome, Fielding lapsed into Bridget Jones mode and obsessed over Darcy in his wet shirt. Firth participated in the following editing process of what critics would consider "one of the funniest sequences in the diary's sequel". Both novels make various other references to the BBC serial.

Pride and Prejudice screenwriter Andrew Davies collaborated on the screenplays for the 2001 and 2004 Bridget Jones films, which would show Crispin Bonham-Carter (Mr Bingley in Pride and Prejudice) and Lucy Robinson (Mrs Hurst) in minor roles. The self-referential in-joke between the projects intrigued Colin Firth and he accepted the role of Mark Darcy, as it gave him an opportunity to ridicule and liberate himself from his Pride and Prejudice character. Film critic James Berardinelli would later state that Firth "plays this part [of Mark Darcy] exactly as he played the earlier role, making it evident that the two Darcys are essentially the same". The producers never found a solution to incorporate the Jones Firth interview in the second film but shot a spoof interview with Firth as himself and Renée Zellweger staying in-character as Bridget Jones after a day's wrap. The scene is available as a deleted scene on DVD.

== Adaptations ==
=== Screen ===
The first novel was turned into a film of the same name in 2001, directed by Sharon Maguire. The movie starred Renée Zellweger as Bridget, Hugh Grant as Daniel Cleaver and Colin Firth as Mark Darcy. Before the film was released, a considerable amount of controversy surrounded the casting of the American Zellweger as what some saw as a quintessentially British heroine: however, her performance is widely considered to be of a high standard, including a perfect English accent, and garnered Zellweger a nomination for the Academy Award for Best Actress. A second film was released in 2004, directed by Beeban Kidron. There are many differences between the books and the films. A third film, Bridget Jones's Baby, was released on 16 September 2016. Patrick Dempsey was cast as Jack Qwant. A fourth film, adapting Mad About the Boy, was released in February 2025. Actors Renée Zellweger, Colin Firth and Hugh Grant are joined by Leo Woodall (as Bridget's young love interest) and Chiwetel Ejiofor (as a teacher).

=== Musical ===
Lily Allen wrote a musical based on the novel, which was 'workshopped' in London with a cast including Sheridan Smith in the title role. Although a full production was anticipated for some time, Allen has since said she doubts it will 'see the light of day'.
