= Helen Fielding =

English novelist and screenwriter

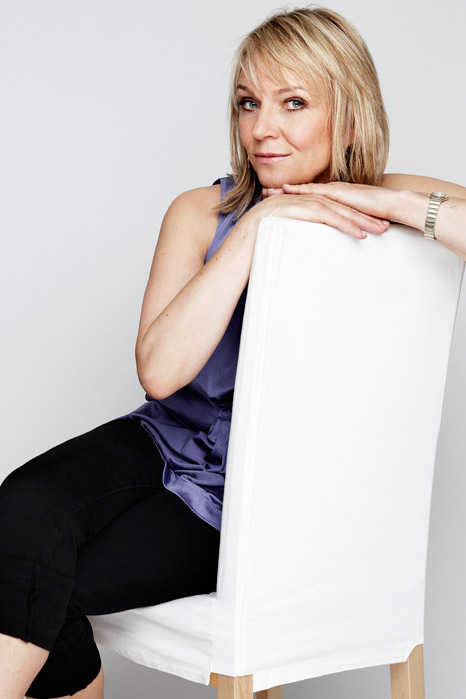
- Born: 19 February 1958 (age 68); Morley, West Yorkshire, England
- Education: St Anne's College, Oxford
- Occupations: Journalist, novelist, screenwriter
- Partner: Kevin Curran (died 2016)
- Children: 2

Helen Fielding (born 19 February 1958) is a British journalist, novelist and screenwriter, best known as the creator of the fictional character Bridget Jones. Fielding’s first novel was set in a refugee camp in East Africa and she started writing Bridget Jones in an anonymous column in London’s Independent newspaper. This turned into an unexpected hit, leading to four Bridget Jones novels and four films.

Fielding credits the success of Bridget Jones to tapping into the gap between how we all feel we are expected to be and how we really are.

Fielding's novel Bridget Jones's Diary became a global bestseller, published in more than 40 countries. Fielding continued to chronicle Bridget’s life in the novels Bridget Jones: The Edge of Reason, Bridget Jones’s Baby: the Diaries and Bridget Jones: Mad About the Boy all of which became international bestsellers.

The films chronicling these adventures – Bridget Jones’s Diary, Bridget Jones: The Edge of Reason, Bridget Jones’s Baby and Bridget Jones: Mad About the Boy – were all successful commercially.

In a 2004 poll for the BBC, Fielding was named the 29th most influential person in British culture. In December 2016, the BBC's Woman's Hour included Bridget Jones as one of the seven women who had most influenced British female culture over the last seven decades. Bridget was the only fictional woman included.

== Biography ==
Fielding grew up in Morley, West Yorkshire, a textile town on the outskirts of Leeds in the north of England. Her father was managing director of a textile factory, next door to the family home, that produced cloth for miners' donkey jackets. He died in 1982 and her mother, Nellie, remained in Yorkshire, dying in 2021.

Fielding attended Wakefield Girls' High School, one of the private grammar schools in the Wakefield Grammar School Foundation. She has three siblings.

Fielding read English at St Anne's College, Oxford, and was part of The Oxford Revue at the 1978 Edinburgh Festival.

Fielding began work at the BBC in 1979 as a regional researcher on the news magazine Nationwide. She progressed to working as a production manager and director on various entertainment shows. In 1985, Fielding produced and directed a live satellite broadcast from a refugee camp in Eastern Sudan for the launch of Comic Relief. She also wrote and produced documentaries in Africa for the first two Comic Relief fundraising broadcasts. In 1989, she was a researcher for an edition of the Thames TV This Week series "Where Hunger is a Weapon" about the Southern Sudan rebel war. These experiences formed the basis for her debut novel, Cause Celeb.

From 1990 to 1999, she worked as a journalist and columnist on several national newspapers, including The Sunday Times, The Independent and The Telegraph. Her best-known work, Bridget Jones's Diary, began its life as an unattributed column in The Independent in 1995. The success of the column led to four novels and four film adaptations. Fielding was part of the screenwriting team for all four.

== Bridget Jones ==
Fielding's first novel, Cause Celeb, was published in 1994 to great reviews but limited sales. She was struggling to make ends meet while working on her second novel, a satire about cultural divides in the Caribbean when she was approached by London's The Independent newspaper to write a column as herself about single life in London. Fielding rejected this idea as too embarrassing and exposing, and offered instead to create an imaginary, exaggerated, ironically comic character.

Writing anonymously, she felt able to be honest about the preoccupations of single women in their thirties. The column quickly acquired a following, her identity was revealed and her publishers asked her to replace her novel about the Caribbean by a novel on Bridget Jones's Diary. The hardback was published in 1996 to good reviews but modest sales. The paperback, published in 1997, went straight to the top of the best-seller chart, stayed there for more than six months and went on to become a worldwide best-seller.

Fielding continued her columns in The Independent, and then The Daily Telegraph until 1997, publishing a second Bridget novel, The Edge of Reason, in November 1999. The film of Bridget Jones's Diary was released in 2001 and its sequel in 2004. Fielding contributed the further adventures of Bridget Jones for The Independent from 2005. Fielding announced in November 2012 that she was writing a third instalment in the Bridget Jones series.

Bridget Jones: Mad About the Boy was published in the UK by Jonathan Cape and in the US by Alfred A. Knopf in October 2013. It debuted at number one on The Sunday Times bestseller list, and number seven on The New York Times bestseller list. By the time the UK paperback was published on 19 June 2014, sales had reached one million copies. The novel was shortlisted for the 15th Bollinger Everyman Wodehouse Prize, nominated in the Popular Fiction category of the National Book Award. and has been translated into 32 languages.

The films Bridget Jones’s Diary, Bridget Jones: The Edge of Reason and Bridget Jones’s Baby have taken more than three quarters of a billion dollars at the box office.

Fielding wrote the original screenplays for Bridget Jones’s Diary, Bridget Jones’s Baby and Bridget Jones: Mad About the Boy, further developed by additional writers. Bridget Jones Diary was directed by Sharon Maguire, with the screenplay developed by Fielding, Andrew Davies and Richard Curtis.

== Personal life ==
Fielding lives in London and also spends time in Los Angeles. She and Kevin Curran, a writer and executive producer on The Simpsons, began a relationship in 2000 and had two children. Curran died from cancer complications on 25 October 2016.

== Philanthropic work ==
Helen is an Ambassador for Save the Children; the Yorkshire Children’s Charity, working to alleviate child poverty in her native Yorkshire; and Ohana One, an organization of Los Angeles plastic surgeons, performing remote surgeries and surgical training in Mozambique and wider Africa using remote technology.

Fielding contributed to the collection of short stories Ox-Tales: Air, part of the Ox-Tales series which was published in aid of Oxfam in 2009.

== Awards, honors, and nominations ==
- 1997 British Book of the Year
- 2002 Writers Guild of America nomination, Best Screenplay
- 2002 BAFTA nomination, Best Screenplay
- 2002 Evening Standard Award Best Screenplay
- 2013 Bollinger Everyman Wodehouse Prize shortlist, Comic Fiction
- 2013 National Book Award nomination, Best Popular Fiction
- 2016 (Evening Standard) Peter Sellers Award for Comedy
- 2016 Honorary Doctorate of Literature, University of York
- 2017 Bollinger Everyman Wodehouse Prize for Bridget Jones’s Baby: The Diaries, Comic Novel of The Year

Fielding's name is one of those featured on the sculpture Ribbons, unveiled in 2024.

== Bibliography ==
- Cause Celeb (1994) is a satire, based on the relationship between celebrities and refugees set in a camp in a fictional country in East Africa.
- Bridget Jones's Diary (1996)
- Bridget Jones: The Edge of Reason (1999)
- Olivia Joules and the Overactive Imagination (2003), a comic spy novel set in Miami, Los Angeles, England and Sudan.
- Bridget Jones: Mad About the Boy (2013)
- Bridget Jones's Baby: The Diaries (2016)

== Film adaptations ==
- Bridget Jones's Diary (2001). Starring Renée Zellweger, Hugh Grant, Colin Firth. Written by Richard Curtis, Andrew Davies, Helen Fielding. Directed by Sharon Maguire. Produced by Working Title Films.
- Bridget Jones: The Edge of Reason (2004). Starring Renée Zellweger, Hugh Grant, Colin Firth. Written by Adam Brooks, Richard Curtis, Andrew Davies, Helen Fielding. Directed by Beeban Kidron. Produced by Working Title Films.
- Bridget Jones's Baby (2016) Starring Renée Zellweger, Colin Firth, Patrick Dempsey. Written by Helen Fielding, Emma Thompson, Dan Mazer, Directed by Sharon Maguire. Produced by Working Title Films.
- Bridget Jones: Mad About the Boy (2025) Starring Renée Zellweger, Chiwetel Ejiofor, Leo Woodall, Colin Firth, Hugh Grant. Written by Helen Fielding, Dan Mazer, Abi Morgan. Directed by Michael Morris. Produced by Working Title Films.
