= List of Colin Firth performances =

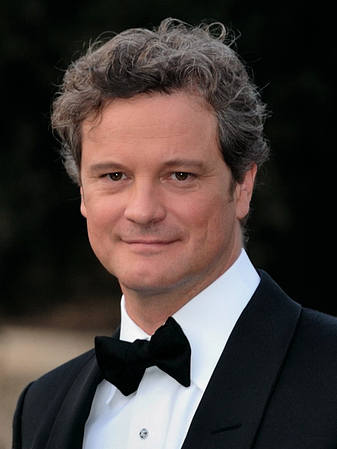
Firth at the 2009 Venice International Film Festival.

Colin Firth is an English actor who has had an extensive career both on stage, screen and television, having received an Academy Award, two BAFTA Awards, a Golden Globe Award, three Screen Actors Guild Awards, and a Volpi Cup, as well as nominations for two Primetime Emmy Awards. Firth's films have grossed more than $4 billion from over 50 releases worldwide.

Firth started his career in the mid-1980s establishing himself as one of the "Brit Pack" of rising young British actors He made his film debut in the romantic historical drama Another Country (1984) followed by roles in A Month in the Country (1987), Valmont (1989), The English Patient (1996), and Shakespeare in Love (1998). He established himself as a romantic comedy lead starring as Mark Darcy in Bridget Jones film series (2001–2025), Jamie Bennett in Love Actually (2003), and Harry Bright in Mamma Mia (2008) and its 2018 sequel. He also acted in the films Relative Values (2000), The Importance of Being Earnest (2002), Girl with a Pearl Earring (2003), What a Girl Wants (2003), and Nanny McPhee (2005).

Firth portrayed King George VI in The Kings Speech (2010) which earned him numerous accolades including the Academy Award for Best Actor. He was previously nominated for his role as a gay man grieving the loss of his partner in A Single Man (2009). He then acted in the spy thriller Tinker Tailor Soldier Spy (2011), the musical fantasy Mary Poppins Returns (2018), the war drama 1917 (2019), the children's film The Secret Garden (2020), the romantic drama Supernova (2020), the war drama Operation Mincemeat (2021), the drama Empire of Light (2022), and the science fiction thriller Disclosure Day (2026). During this time he also produced the films Eye in the Sky (2015), and Loving (2016).

On television, Firth earned stardom and acclaim for his portrayal of Mr. Darcy in the BBC television adaptation of Jane Austen's romance Pride and Prejudice (1995). He was Primetime Emmy Award-nominated for his portrayals of Dr Wilhelm Stuckart in the BBC war drama film Conspiracy (2001), and Michael Peterson in the HBO limited series The Staircase (2022). He was BAFTA TV Award-nominated for his performances as Robert Lawrence in the BBC drama film Tumbledown (1988) and Jim Swire in the Sky Atlantic limited series Lockerbie: A Search for Truth (2025).

== Acting credits ==
=== Film ===
Year	Title	Role	Director	Notes
1984	Another Country	Tommy Judd	Marek Kanievska	
1985	1919	Young Alexander Scherbatov	Hugh Brody	
1987	A Month in the Country	Tom Birkin	Pat O'Connor	
1987	The Secret Garden	Adult Colin Craven	Alan Grint	
1989	Apartment Zero	Adrian LeDuc	Martin Donovan	
1989	Valmont	Valmont	Miloš Forman	
1991	Femme Fatale	Joseph Prince	Andre R. Guttfreund	
1991	Wings of Fame	Brian Smith	Otakar Votocek	
1993	The Hour of the Pig	Richard Courtois	Leslie Megahey	Also known as The Advocate
1994	Playmaker	Michael Condron / Ross Talbert	Yuri Zeltser	
1995	Circle of Friends	Simon Westward	Pat O'Connor	
1996	The English Patient	Geoffrey Clifton	Anthony Minghella	
1997	A Thousand Acres	Jess Clark	Jocelyn Moorhouse	
1997	Fever Pitch	Paul Ashworth	David Evans	
1998	Shakespeare in Love	Lord Wessex	John Madden	
1999	My Life So Far	Edward Pettigrew	Hugh Hudson	
1999	The Secret Laughter of Women	Matthew Field	Peter Schwabach	
2000	Relative Values	Peter Ingleton	Eric Styles	
2001	Bridget Jones's Diary	Mark Darcy	Sharon Maguire	
2002	The Importance of Being Earnest	Jack Worthing	Oliver Parker	
2003	Girl with a Pearl Earring	Johannes Vermeer	Peter Webber	
2003	Hope Springs	Colin Ware	Mark Herman	
2003	Love Actually	Jamie Bennett	Richard Curtis	
2003	What a Girl Wants	Henry Dashwood	Dennie Gordon	
2004	Bridget Jones: The Edge of Reason	Mark Darcy	Beeban Kidron	
2004	Trauma	Ben Slater	Marc Evans	
2005	Nanny McPhee	Cedric Brown	Kirk Jones	
2005	Where the Truth Lies	Vince Collins	Atom Egoyan	
2007	The Last Legion	Aurelius Antonius	Doug Lefler	
2007	And When Did You Last See Your Father?	Blake Morrison	Anand Tucker	
2007	Then She Found Me	Frank	Helen Hunt	
2007	St Trinian's	Geoffrey Thwaites	Oliver Parker & Barnaby Thompson	
2007	In Prison My Whole Life	Himself	Marc Evans	Producer only
2008	The Accidental Husband	Richard Bratton	Griffin Dunne	
2008	Mamma Mia!	Harry Bright	Phyllida Lloyd	
2008	Easy Virtue	Jim Whittaker	Stephan Elliott	
2008	Genova	Joe	Michael Winterbottom	
2009	A Christmas Carol	Fred	Robert Zemeckis	
2009	Dorian Gray	Lord Henry Wotton	Oliver Parker	
2009	A Single Man	George Falconer	Tom Ford	
2009	St Trinian's 2: The Legend of Fritton's Gold	Geoffrey Thwaites	Oliver Parker & Barnaby Thompson	
2010	The King's Speech	King George VI	Tom Hooper	
2010	Main Street	Gus LeRoy	John Doyle	
2010	Steve	Steve	Rupert Friend	Short film
2011	Tinker Tailor Soldier Spy	Bill Haydon	Tomas Alfredson	
2012	Stars in Shorts	Steve	Rupert Friend	Segment: Steve
2012	Gambit	Harry Deane	Michael Hoffman	
2013	Arthur Newman	Arthur Newman / Wallace Avery	Dante Ariola	
2014	The Railway Man	Eric Lomax	Jonathan Teplitzky	
2014	Devil's Knot	Ron Lax	Atom Egoyan	
2014	Magic in the Moonlight	Stanley / Wei Ling Soo	Woody Allen	
2014	Before I Go to Sleep	Ben Lucas	Rowan Joffé	
2014	Kingsman: The Secret Service	Harry Hart / Agent Galahad	Matthew Vaughn	
2015	Eye in the Sky	—	Gavin Hood	Producer only
2016	Genius	Maxwell Perkins	Michael Grandage	
2016	Loving	—	Jeff Nichols	Producer only
2016	Bridget Jones's Baby	Mark Darcy	Sharon Maguire	
2017	Kingsman: The Golden Circle	Harry Hart / Agent Galahad	Matthew Vaughn	
2018	The Happy Prince	Reggie Turner	Rupert Everett	
2018	The Mercy	Donald Crowhurst	James Marsh	
2018	Mamma Mia! Here We Go Again	Harry Bright	Ol Parker	
2018	Kursk	David Russell	Thomas Vinterberg	
2018	Mary Poppins Returns	William Weatherall Wilkins / Wolf (voice)	Rob Marshall	
2019	Greed	Himself	Michael Winterbottom	
2019	1917	General Erinmore	Sam Mendes	
2020	The Secret Garden	Lord Archibald Craven	Marc Munden	
2020	Supernova	Sam	Harry Macqueen	
2021	Mothering Sunday	Mr. Godfrey Niven	Eva Husson	
2021	Operation Mincemeat	Ewen Montagu	John Madden	
2022	Empire of Light	Donald Ellis	Sam Mendes	
2023	Rye Lane	Burrito Maker	Raine Allen-Miller	Cameo
2023	Barbie	Mr. Darcy	Greta Gerwig	Archival footage
2024	Someone's Daughter, Someone's Son	—	Lorna Tucker	Narrator only
2025	Bridget Jones: Mad About the Boy	Mark Darcy	Michael Morris	
2026	Disclosure Day	Noah Scanlon	Steven Spielberg	
TBA	Cry to Heaven †	Count di Stefano	Tom Ford	Post-production
TBA	Bare †	TBA	Lorna Tucker	Filming
TBA	The Joy of Sex †	Alex Comfort	Sharon Maguire	Filming

=== Television ===
Year	Title	Role	Director	Notes
1984	Crown Court	PC Franklin	Gareth Morgan	Episode: "Citizens: Part 1"
1984	Camille	Armand Duval	Desmond Davis	Television film
1985	Dutch Girls	Neil Truelove	Giles Foster	Television film
1986	Lost Empires	Richard Herncastle	Alan Grint	Television miniseries
1987	Tales from the Hollywood Hills: Pat Hobby Teamed with Genius	Rene Wilcox	Rob Thompson	PBS Shorts Special
1987	The Secret Garden	Adult Colin Craven	Alan Grint	Hallmark Hall of Fame
1988	Tumbledown	Robert Lawrence	Richard Eyre	Television film
1991	Out of the Blue	Alan	Nick Hamm	Play for television
1992	Hostages	John McCarthy	David Wheatley	Television film – HBO
1994	Master of the Moor	Stephen Whalby	Marc Evans	Television film – UK
1994	The Deep Blue Sea	Freddie Page	Karel Reisz	Play for television – UK
1995	Pride and Prejudice	Fitzwilliam Darcy	Simon Langton	Television miniseries
1995	The Widowing of Mrs. Holroyd	Charles Holroyd	Katie Mitchell	Play for television – UK
1997	Nostromo	Charles Gould	Alastair Reid	Television miniseries
1999	Blackadder: Back & Forth	William Shakespeare	Paul Weiland	Television short
1999	The Turn of the Screw	The Master	Ben Bolt	Masterpiece Theatre
2000	Donovan Quick	Donovan Quick/Daniel Quinn	David Blair	Television film
2001	Conspiracy	Wilhelm Stuckart	Frank Pierson	Television film – HBO
2001	We Know Where You Live	Himself	Declan Lowney	Benefit for Amnesty International
2001	Fourplay	Allen Portland	Mike Binder	Television film – HBO, also known as Londinium
2004	Saturday Night Live	Himself	Beth McCarthy-Miller	Episode: "Colin Firth/Norah Jones"
2006	Born Equal	Mark Armitage	Dominic Savage	Television film – UK
2017	Red Nose Day Actually	Jamie	Richard Curtis & Mat Whitecross	Television short film
2022	The Staircase	Michael Peterson	Antonio Campos	Miniseries
2025	Lockerbie: A Search for Truth	Jim Swire	Otto Bathurst	Miniseries
2026	Young Sherlock	Sir Bucephalus Hodge	Guy Ritchie	Series
TBA	Berlin Noir †	Paul Lohser	Tom Shankland; Luke Snellin	Upcoming series

=== Theatre ===
Year	Title	Role	Playwright	Venue
1983	Another Country	Guy Bennett	Julian Mitchell	Queen's Theatre, West End
1984	The Doctor's Dilemma	Louis Dubedat	George Bernard Shaw	Churchill Theatre, Bromley
1985	The Lonely Road	Felix	Arthur Schnitzler	The Old Vic, London
1987	Desire Under the Elms	Eben	Eugene O'Neill	Greenwich Theatre, London
1991	The Caretaker	Aston	Harold Pinter	Comedy Theatre, West End
1993	Chatsky	Chatsky	Alexander Griboyedov	Almeida Theatre, London
1999	Three Days of Rain	Walker/Ned	Richard Greenberg	Donmar Warehouse, London

== See also ==
- List of awards and nominations received by Colin Firth
