= Kate Hodgson =

- Born: 30 August 1985 (age 41); Birkenhead, Merseyside, England
- Education: Italia Conti Academy of Theatre Arts
- Occupation: Actress
- Years active: 2008–present
- Height: 5 ft 5 in (1.65 m)
- Spouse: Justin McDonald

Kate Hodgson (born 30 August 1985) is an English actress and producer.

== Early life ==
Kate Hodgson was born in Birkenhead, Merseyside in North West England.

In 2006, she graduated from Italia Conti Academy of Theatre Arts with a degree in acting.

== Career ==
2008 saw Hodgson appear in the British TV serial drama Hollyoaks for Channel 4 as Jennifer Kiddle. In 2010, she made her stage debut in Backbeat at Citizens' Theatre, Glasgow playing Cynthia Lennon. The play was an original stage adaption of the film of the same name, directed by Iain Softley. In 2015 Hodgson starred in Murderous Injustice, a harrowing short film based on the true events of murdered immigrant Bijan Ebrahimi. The film has subsequently been added to the shortlist for the 2016 Edinburgh International Film Festival.
