= James Belcher =

English bare-knuckle fighter (1781–1811)

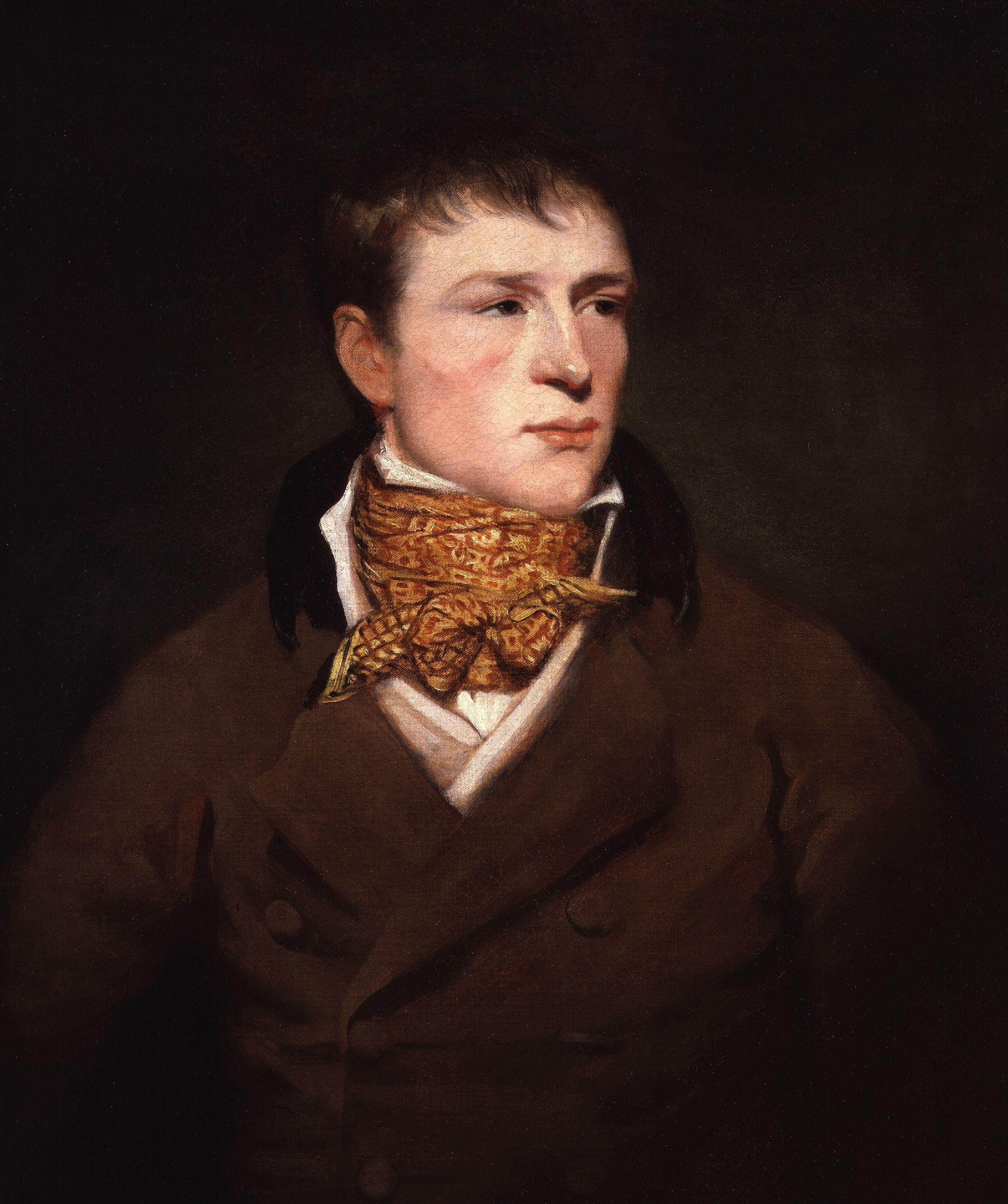
Portrait of Jem Belcher, circa 1800

James Belcher, also known as Jem Belcher (15 April 1781 – 30 July 1811), was an English bare-knuckle prize-fighter and Champion of All England 1800–1805.

== Early life ==
Belcher was born at his father's house in St. James's churchyard, Bristol, on 15 April 1781. His maternal grandfather was Jack Slack (d. 1778), a noted fighter, who had defeated Jack Broughton in April 1750. Although never formally apprenticed, 'Jem' Belcher became a butcher.

== Boxing career ==
In his youth, he became known for his pugilistic—and other—feats at Lansdown fair. Belcher was a natural fighter, described as "elegant" in style, whose skills were less due to instruction than his own ability. He was considered good-humoured, finely proportioned, and well-looking. He came to London in 1798 and sparred with Bill Warr, a veteran boxer, of Covent Garden, who concluded that Belcher was "a match for any man in the kingdom". On 12 April 1799, after a fight of thirty-three minutes, he beat Tom Jones of Paddington at Wormwood Scrubbs.

He drew with Jack Bartholomew in a 51-round bout in 1799, but in the following year, on 18 May 1800, on Finchley Common, the 19-year-old Belcher, after seventeen rounds, knocked out the 37-year-old Bartholomew with a 'terrific' body blow to win the rematch.

On 22 December 1800, near Abershaw's gibbet on Wimbledon Common, he fought Andrew Gamble, the Irish champion. Four days before the fight, Belcher said that he was attacked by four thugs in Chelsea, whom he proceeded to beat up without getting harmed himself. It was suspected that someone sent those men so he would be unable to fight the high-stakes match, but since he could not provide evidence the fight still went ahead. Belcher defeated Gamble in only five rounds, Gamble being confounded by his opponent's quickness. After this victory Belcher seems to have been acclaimed as English Prizefighting Champion. On 25 November 1801 he met Joe Berks of Wem, and defeated him after sixteen rounds of desperate fighting. He fought him again on 20 August 1802, and Berks retired at the end of the 14th round, by which time he could scarcely stand and was badly cut about the face. In April 1803 he severely punished John Firby, 'the young ruffian,' in a hastily arranged encounter. Next month he had to appear before Lord Ellenborough in the court of king's bench for rioting and fighting, and was defended by Erskine and Francis Const.

In July 1803 Belcher lost an eye when playing racquetball. He never could really overcome the loss of his eye so his friends bought him the pub "Jolly Brewers" on Wardour Street, where he put on sparring exhibitions and met and inspired Henry Pearce, a young boxer whose manager he became. It became apparent that he would be Belcher's successor to the title Champion of England. In 1805, Belcher returned to the ring as he refused to give up his title without a fight. Belcher invited Pearce to London, hoping to keep the championship in Bristol's hands, The two men had a tough fight at a common in Blyth, a coaching stop seven miles north of Retford, Nottinghamshire on the Great North Road on 6 December 1805. Belcher chose the venue on a coin toss, deciding to site it 150 miles north of London so that the police did not disrupt the fight. The crowd were adorned with handkerchiefs of blue birdseye in support of "the Chicken", and the "famous yellow-striped 'Belcher'". Here Belcher displayed all his old vigour and punching speed, but lacked power, and was impaired by his damaged vision in ascertaining range; he was defeated in 18 rounds. Pearce never fought again and died from tuberculosis in 1809.

This fight was followed by another two bouts, both against Tom Cribb. In their first encounter, on 8 April 1807, at Moulsey Hurst, they fought forty-one rounds, where Belcher came a close second due to his impaired vision and a sprained wrist; the sequel, on 1 February 1809, was in answer to a challenge for the belt and two hundred guineas. Belcher again lost after thirty-one rounds, but it was judged that, had Belcher been in his peak condition, Cribb would have been the loser. This was Belcher's last fight; virtually ruined by the huge gambling losses he sustained at this fight, he caused a fracas after the bout, for which he spent four weeks in prison.

Belcher was known as "the Napoleon of the Ring" and "the Black Diamond". Belcher was reckoned "one of the greatest fighters" ever to enter the prize-ring, with special appreciation of his speed: "you heard his blows, you did not see them". His good qualities were well-known, in private life "good-humoured, modest, and unassuming", although after his last fight he suffered from low spirits, having been deserted by most of his old patrons: Thomas Pitt, 2nd Baron Camelford, however, at his death on 10 March 1804, left Belcher his famous bulldog Trusty.

Portraits are given in 'Pugilistica' and Boxiana, in which Pierce Egan remarks upon his likeness to Napoleon. A link between the silver and golden ages of the prize-ring, Belcher was 'as well known to his own generation as Pitt or Wellington.' Like the latter he is commemorated by an article of attire, a 'belcher' or blue-and-white spotted neckerchief, though the term is applied loosely to any particoloured handkerchief tied round the neck. In 1805 a very brief but blood-thirsty 'Treatice (sic) on Boxing by Mr. J. Belcher' was appended to George Barrington's New London Spy for that year.

== Death ==
Belcher died on 30 July 1811 at the Coach and Horses, Frith Street, Soho, which he left to his widow, and was buried at Marylebone. “By the consequence of his various battles,” stated the Gentleman's Magazine, “aided by great irregularity of living, he had reduced himself to a most pitiable situation for the last eighteen months, and came to suffer the effects of his lifestyle.” Put more plainly, he died from alcoholism.

== Tom Belcher ==
Jim's younger brother, Tom Belcher, was also a distinguished pugilist, beating Dan Dogherty, the 'Young Ruffian' John Firby, and some lesser-known fighters, but he was badly defeated by Dutch Sam (Samuel Elias). He was an accomplished boxer and sparrer; and at the Tennis Court, during Tom Cribb's proprietorship, he bested such experts as Shaw the lifeguardsman, John Gully, and the African-American Tom Molineaux.

Belcher faced Dogherty at the Curragh of Kildare on 23 April 1813; Pierce Egan's account indicates that the Irish fighter was outclassed by the London Fancy's hero: 'Twentieth. – Belcher now seemed perfectly at home, and felt convinced how things were going. The length of his arm, added to the advantage of superior science, enabled him to serve out Dogherty about the head with such severity of manner, as to occasion the latter to fall at his feet'.

Tom Belcher, 'gentlemanly and inoffensive,' died in London on 9 December 1854, aged 71, having been tavern-keeper at the Castle, Holborn, subsequently kept by Tom Spring. He is buried in Nunhead Cemetery, London.

== References in popular culture ==
Belcher features as a character in Rodney Stone, a Gothic mystery and boxing novel by Sir Arthur Conan Doyle.

Charles Dickens refers to the Belcher neckerchief in The Old Curiosity Shop (1841): the character Richard Swiveller says in Ch. 34: 'What shall I be next? Shall I be a convict in a felt hat and a grey suit, trotting about a dockyard with my number neatly embroidered on my uniform, and the order of the garter on my leg, restrained from chafing my ankle by a twisted Belcher handkerchief?'

In Patrick O'Brian's seafaring novel The Thirteen-Gun Salute, captain Jack Aubrey commands a frigate called Diane, which has a cannon named Belcher. The reference to the prize-fighter is clear, because other cannon are also named after famous prize-fighters (Tom Cribb, Game Chicken).

The 2022 Amazon Prime Video biopic movie, Prizefighter: The Life of Jem Belcher, stars Matt Hookings as Belcher, Russell Crowe as Belcher's grandfather, Jack Slack, and Ray Winstone as Belcher's trainer, Bill Warr. Hookings was the movie's producer and wrote the screenplay, and it was directed by Daniel Graham.

== Sources ==
- Pierce Egan. Boxiana, or, Sketches of ancient and modern pugilism; from the days of the renowned Broughton and Slack, to the heroes of the present milling æra! (1812)
- William Oxberry, Pancratia, or a History of Pugilism (1812)
- This article incorporates text from a publication now in the public domain: Lee, Sidney, ed. (1901). "Belcher, James". Dictionary of National Biography (1st supplement). London: Smith, Elder & Co.
- Chapter on Jem Belcher in Pugilistica, the History of British Boxing volume 1, 1906, Henry Downes Miles
