= Prizefighter: The Life of Jem Belcher =

2022 film directed by Daniel Graham

- Film poster
- Directed by: Daniel Graham
- Written by: Matt Hookings
- Produced by: Chris Hardman; Matt Hookings
- Starring: Matt Hookings; Ray Winstone; Russell Crowe; Marton Csokas; Jodhi May; Steven Berkoff; Julian Glover
- Cinematography: Ben Brahem Ziryab
- Edited by: Chris Gill
- Music by: Paul Saunderson
- Production companies: XYZ Films; Camelot Films; Hardman Pictures
- Distributed by: Amazon Studios
- Release dates: June 30, 2022 (Russia); July 22, 2022 (Amazon Prime)
- Running time: 107 minutes
- Countries: United States; United Kingdom; Lithuania; Malta
- Language: English
- Box office: $150,499

Prizefighter: The Life of Jem Belcher is a 2022 British-American biographical drama film about the birth of boxing, written by and starring Matt Hookings. The film explores the life of Jem Belcher who became the youngest ever world champion. Jem was partially blind at the age of 22 and dead by the age of 30. The film stars Matt Hookings as Jem Belcher, Ray Winstone as his trainer Bill Warr and Russell Crowe as Jem's boozy grandfather Jack Slack. Marton Csokas, Jodhi May, Steven Berkoff, Julian Glover, Julius Francis are the supporting cast. The film was first theatrically released in Russia on June 30, 2022, and it had a VOD release by Amazon Prime on July 22, 2022.

== Plot ==
Although based on real events, the film is a largely fictitious re-imagining of the life of Jem Belcher from when he grows up watching his revered grandfather Jack Slack fight as a bare-knuckle pugilist. Jem is constantly warned by his mother Mary Belcher against following his grandfather's life as Prizefighter. One afternoon, Jem spots an opportunity for some coin and fights in a fair easily defeating the troupe's champion, Bob 'the Blackbeard' Britton. He is spotted by Bill Warr, who approaches Jem to come fight for him. His mother is appalled but the older Jack, advises him that if he maintains discipline unlike himself, he could become a true champion. Jem takes to prize fighting with ease and is quickly pitched against the champion of England, who he manages to defeat after being coached by Bill. He is revered around the country and Mary is shocked to hear how far and quickly her son has risen. though like Jack takes to the lifestyle of a fighter poorly and is intoxicated by the trappings it provides. Jem quickly begins losing discipline to vice after being enveloped in Rushworth's decadent lifestyle. Leading to a rift in his relationship with Bill, who is concerned Jem will lose his new found status as Champion. Jem’s vision is severely effected after being struck the eye during a handball match against Rushworth. After which, Bill encourages Jem to step back from fighting and return home to rest and see his family. The younger Jem, declines and cannot differentiate himself from the fighter and the man. Jem goes on a destructive trail, drinking and eventually winds up in prison. When he is released, he returns to see his family. Jem realises he has taken his skill for granted and rejoins Bill to train for his title defense. Bill trains Jem hard to prepare him for Henry 'The Game Chicken' Pearce who is a dangerous opponent and the new Champion of England. Rushworth takes to training Pearce knowing that Jem has a weak eye.

The fight is commenced under new rules with boxing gloves which Jem is unaccustomed to. Pearce immediately targets Jem's damaged eye and Bill guides Jem through the fight. After two vicious rounds, Jem is barely holding his own. Bill advises Jem to box tactically and not get caught in a slugging match. Jem overpowers Pearce and knocks him to the floor, but the younger fighter beats the count. The fight continues and becomes a brutal test of survival for both fighters.

The film concludes with a note to say that Bill Warr died in 1809, Jem was crowned the youngest champion ever and died 2 years after Bill in 1811 at just 30 years of age.

== Cast ==
- Matt Hookings as Jem Belcher
- Ray Winstone as Bill Warr
- Russell Crowe as Jack Slack
- Marton Csokas as Lord Rushworth
- Jodhi May as Mary Belcher
- Steven Berkoff as Walter
- Julian Glover as Lord Ashford
- Michael McKell as Frank the Bomber
- Joe Egan as Big Joe
- Noeleen Comiskey as Violet
- Steve Dent as End Fight Referee

== Production ==
Principal photography began on June 27, 2021 in Wales and finished in Malta on November 9, 2021. On July 28, 2021, it was announced that after the film was being shot in south Wales had to move production abroad to Lithuania due to a lack of financial support by Creative Wales, even though lead actor and writer Matt Hookings is Welsh. The film was delayed due to significant financial issues, including infighting amongst producers. In May 2022, it was announced that Russell Crowe would be joining the film.

== Release ==
The film was first theatrically released in Russia on June 30, 2022, and then in Croatia, United Arab Emirates, Portugal, Spain. It had a VOD release by Amazon Prime on July 22, 2022.

== Reception ==
=== Box office ===
Prizefighter: The Life of Jem Belcher grossed $0 in North America and $150,499 in other territories.

=== Critical response ===
On review aggregator website Rotten Tomatoes, 20% of 15 critics gave the film a positive review, with an average rating of 4.7/10.

== Historical accuracies ==
The film differs from the actual events of Jem Belcher's life in a number of ways:

- he first came to the attention of Bill Warr after moving to London from his native Bristol in 1798;
- Belcher's principal patron was Baron Camelford;
- the fight between Pearce and Belcher was not fought with gloves as they did not become mandatory until 1865 and were not used competitively until 1818;
- Belcher would come back from his defeat at the hands of Henry Pearce to fight Tom Cribb twice in 1807 and 1809 before retiring.
