= Justin McDonald =

British actor (born 1983)

- Born: Justin Mark McDonald; 21 March 1983 (age 43); Gateshead, England
- Education: Italia Conti Academy of Theatre Arts
- Occupation: Actor
- Years active: 2005–present
- Spouse: Kate Hodgson

Justin McDonald (born 21 March 1983) is a British actor of film, television and theatre.

== Early life ==
Justin Mark McDonald was born in Gateshead, Tyne and Wear in North East England. His keen interest in art and literature led him into acting at an early age and he was soon awarded a scholarship by the prestigious Italia Conti Academy of Theatre Arts in London where he gained a Bachelor of Arts Honours Degree in Acting.

== Career ==
McDonald went on to complete his studies early in order to film on the television drama Distant Shores for ITV Granada, playing series regular Ben McCallister. Following this he has appeared in many acclaimed television productions such as Holby City, The Bill, Torchwood, Afterlife, Casualty, Emmerdale, Wolfblood and the crime detective series Inspector George Gently.

McDonald's first major film saw him appearing alongside Renée Zellweger and Ewan McGregor in the Beatrix Potter biopic Miss Potter as the young William Heelis, who encouraged the young Beatrix Potter to write and illustrate her stories. He then went on to appear in another British biopic playing Steve in And When Did You Last See Your Father? which starred Jim Broadbent and Colin Firth. The film was based on the memoirs of the same title written by Blake Morrison. More recently McDonald played a lead Detective in feature film Winter Ridge.

McDonald's stage debut came in 2010, playing the role of Klaus Voormann in the original stage adaptation of Backbeat. The untold story of The Beatles during their early Hamburg days.

As well as acting on stage and screen, McDonald is an accomplished voice over artist. He played the voice of Frank Simmons in the Wii video game Cursed Mountain. His voice career has also led him to the Monty Python comedy troupe, playing the voice of young David Sherlock in the animated feature film A Liar's Autobiography: The Untrue Story of Monty Python's Graham Chapman

McDonald also played the role of 'Ronnie' in Rag'n'Bone Man music video Hard Came The Rain LP for Sony Music.

== Awards and nominations ==
In 2023, McDonald received a Royal Television Society award for his performance in British Film Institute film Fist.

== Selected work ==
Television
Year	Title	Role	Notes
2005	Distant Shores	Ben McCallister	Series 1, episodes 1–6 (main cast)
2005	Holby City	Matthew Samuels	Series 7, episode 16 "Live and Let Die"
2005	The Bill	Eddie Clark	Series 21, episode 64 "337"
2006	Afterlife	Cameron	Series 2, episode 5 "Mirrorball"
2006	Torchwood	Matt	Series 1, episode 2 "Day One"
2008	Casualty	Lewis Cork	Series 22, episode 21 "Adrenaline Rush"
2008	Doctors	Robin Hartnall	Series 9, episode 207 "Hopelessly Devoted"
2009	Inspector George Gently	Jed Jimpson	Series 2, episode 4 "Gently Through the Mill"
2012	Emmerdale	Trevor Cunningham	Recurring Role
2013	Casualty	Rory Timpson	Recurring Role
2016	Wolfblood	Dr Jones	Series 4

Film
Year	Title	Role
2006	Miss Potter	Young William Heelis
2007	Vampire Diary	Brad
2007	And When Did You Last See Your Father?	Steve
2012	A Liar's Autobiography: The Untrue Story of Monty Python's Graham Chapman	Young David Sherlock (voice)
2018	Winter Ridge	Tom Harris
2019	A Modern Magician	Jim
2021	Evie	Jeremy
2021	The Almond and the Seahorse	Simon
2022	Fist	Aaron
2023	Goodwin Island	Kai

Theatre
Year	Title	Role	Theatre	Notes
2010	Backbeat	Klaus Voormann	Citizens' Theatre, Glasgow	Based on the 1994 film of the same name
2016	The Fighting Bradfords	Roland Boys Bradford	Gala Theatre, Durham, England	

Voice
Year	Title	Notes
2009	Cursed Mountain	Video game
2020	Total War Saga: Troy	Video game
