= The Awakening (2026 film) =

- Film poster
- Directed by: Matt Routledge
- Written by: Justin Tinto; Matt Routledge; Matt Hookings
- Produced by: Tim Kent; Matt Hookings
- Starring: Justin Tinto; Alice Eve; Kevin Spacey
- Cinematography: László Bille
- Edited by: Chris Gill
- Production companies: Awakening Movie Ltd; Camelot Films
- Distributed by: Blue Harbor Entertainment (United States)
- Release dates: November 10, 2026 (Matera Film Festival); November 24, 2026 (United States)
- Country: United Kingdom
- Language: English

The Awakening is a 2026 British conspiracy thriller film directed by Matt Routledge, in his feature debut. The screenplay is by Justin Tinto, Routledge and Matt Hookings. It stars Tinto and Alice Eve, with Kevin Spacey in a supporting role. Tinto financed the film independently through Awakening Movie Ltd, and Tim Kent and Hookings produced it in association with Camelot Films.

Principal photography began at Pinewood Studios in May 2024. The film premiered at the Matera Film Festival in Italy on 10 November 2026, and Blue Harbor Entertainment released it on digital and cable platforms in the United States on 24 November 2026.

== Plot ==
Set during a global pandemic, former Army officer Jason Reynolds, whose parents have disappeared, and Rebecca Reynolds uncover a conspiracy run by a hidden organization called The Order.

== Cast ==
- Peter Stormare
- Steven Berkoff
- Matt Hookings
- Julian Glover
- Justin Tinto as Jason Reynolds
- Alice Eve as Rebecca Reynolds
- Eddie Hall
- Dapper Laughs
- Kevin Spacey

== Production ==
In April 2024, Screen Daily reported that Peter Stormare, Steven Berkoff, Matt Hookings, Julian Glover and Justin Tinto had joined the film. Tinto had written the original script. Hookings and Tim Kent were producing it for Camelot Media, and it was independently financed ahead of a shoot at Pinewood Studios.

Filming began at Pinewood in May 2024. Alice Eve, Eddie Hall and Daniel O'Reilly, known as Dapper Laughs, joined the cast. Variety reported that Camelot Media and Awakening Productions were the producers, with Eve as an executive producer, László Bille as cinematographer, Chris Gill as editor and Luke Tumbler as stunt coordinator. Those reports named Tinto's character Jason Byrd.

In May 2025, while the film was in post-production, Kevin Spacey joined the cast and Cloud9 Studios launched sales at the Cannes Film Festival. Camelot Films was financing the film with Tinto. Hookings and Kent were the producers, and the executive producers were reported as Tinto, Sally Woodward, Adrian Goodisman and Cloud9's Pia Patatian. Spacey attended Cannes that year to promote the film.

In November 2026, Variety reported that Tinto had financed the film through Awakening Movie Ltd, with Kent and Hookings producing in association with Camelot Films. It named the lead characters Jason Reynolds and Rebecca Reynolds.

== Release ==
The film premiered on 10 November 2026 at the Matera Film Festival in Italy. A British premiere was held at Pinewood Studios on 13 November 2026. Blue Harbor Entertainment released the film on digital and cable platforms in the United States on 24 November 2026. Variety reported that a British release would follow, and that further international dates had not been set.
