= Michael McKell =

English actor (born 1959)

- Born: 10 February 1959 (age 67); Tottenham, Haringey, England
- Occupations: Actor; singer
- Years active: 1985–present
- Television: Murder Investigation Team; Doctors; Emmerdale

Michael McKell (born 10 February 1959) is an English actor and singer. His career began in music, co-writing various songs for Toyah Willcox, Dollar and Julien Clerc, as well as embarking on a brief solo career. McKell then focused on acting and became known for playing Inspector Trevor Hands in Murder Investigation Team (2003–2005), Dr. Nick West in Doctors (2006–2008) and Nick Henshall in Emmerdale (2008–2011). Alongside various television and theatre roles, McKell has led an established film career since the 1990s, having appeared in numerous films including Essex Boys (2000), Once Upon a Time in London (2019) and Prizefighter: The Life of Jem Belcher (2022).

== Early life ==
McKell was born on 10 February 1959 in Tottenham, Haringey, in his grandparents' house. He was initially to be named Paul, chosen by his mother, but after weeks of not having a registered name, his father registered him as Michael. Alongside his mother, a factory worker, and his father, a chargehand, moved to Walthamstow in his youth. Growing up, the family had money troubles.

== Career ==
=== Music ===
McKell started his working life as a musician. He was the singer/songwriter for the band The Park, penning hits for Toyah Willcox, Dollar and Julien Clerc. His solo career after deals with Phonogram, WEA and EMI was cut short by a near fatal car crash in August 1991.

In 1985, he toured as Michael St James with French star Julien Clerc and worked with French singer–songwriter Serge Gainsbourg. McKell released an EP, Shower over Moon Street, in 2009 and performed tracks from his album Shower over Moon Street at the Royal Albert Hall in November 2009. "Save Me", the first single from the album, was released on 25 July 2010. In 2022, he released the album The Last Picture Show.

=== Television ===
McKell is known for appearing in two British soap operas, Doctors, in which he played Dr. Nick West from 2006 until the character was run over and killed in 2008, and Emmerdale, in which he played DC Nick Henshall over two separate periods from 2008 to 2011, until the character committed suicide. He has also appeared in a third soap opera, EastEnders, as the hitman Carter who supposedly killed Paul Trueman under the orders of Andy Hunter. For his role as Nick in Doctors, McKell received nominations for Sexiest Male at the 2006, 2007 and 2008 British Soap Awards. His exit storyline later saw a nomination at the 2009 ceremony.

He is also known for playing D.S./D.I. Trevor Hands in two series of the ITV drama Murder Investigation Team, two series of Channel 4's Totally Frank and the BBC series Blessed, playing Ronnie, a Jaggeresque musician.

=== Film ===
McKell starred in the cult film Essex Boys alongside Sean Bean as drug dealer Wayne Lovell. Other films include Beneath Still Waters, Acts of Godfrey, The Low Down, Blood, Bar, Death, Freight, Shouting Men, Outpost: Rise of the Spetsnaz, Hatton Garden: the Heist and Who Needs Enemies. McKell played the titular roles in Steve Lawson's 2021 film Jekyll and Hyde, and appeared in 2022's Prizefighter with Matt Hookings, Ray Winstone and Russell Crowe.

=== Theatre ===
McKell appeared in a production of Macbeth at the Lyric Hammersmith in the late 1990s. He has appeared in West End musicals, including Blood Brothers and the Rod Stewart musical Tonight's the Night, written and directed by Ben Elton. Elton later went on to write the character Ronnie for McKell in his BBC comedy Blessed. McKell played "Lank" in the double Olivier winning production of Crazy for You in 2012 and returned to the role he created "Stoner" in the 2014 production of Tonight's the Night.

From January to July 2015, McKell co-starred with Tina Hobley, Jamie Lomas, Rik Makarem and Gray O'Brien in a nationwide touring production of Peter James's Dead Simple. From September to October 2015, McKell appeared with Nick Moran in Roaring Trade at the Park Theatre.

From 7 December 2015 to 3 January 2016, McKell appeared in his first pantomime as Abanazar in Aladdin at the Derby Arena. McKell then portrayed Paul in Irvine Welsh's play Creatives at the Edinburgh Festival 2017. McKell embarked on a UK and Ireland tour when he appeared in We Will Rock You from 2019.

== Filmography ==
=== Film ===
Year	Title	Role	Notes
2000	Blood	Guy	
2000	Essex Boys	Wayne Lovell	
2000	The Low Down	Pubman	
2000	Kitchen Sync	Man	Short film
2001	Bar	Barman	
2005	Beneath Still Waters	Dan Quarry	
2010	Freight	Vasile	
2011	Will	First Detective	
2012	Acts of Godfrey	Billy McGann	
2012	After Death	Buck Darrenson	
2013	Outpost: Rise of the Spetsnaz	Colonel Strasser	
2013	Who Needs Enemies	Ian	
2014	O.	Sgt. Miles	
2015	Shoe Polish	Sidney	Short film
2016	Essex Vendetta	Spencer	
2016	Hatton Garden: the Heist	Basil	
2016	Allied	German Officer at Anfa Café	
2017	The Birth of Boxing	Frank the Ringmaster	Short film
2017	Freehold	Gerry	
2017	Transhuman	Michael	
2017	Leonard	Bernie	Short film
2018	Winter Ridge	John Faulkner	
2018	Where Hands Touch	Gestapo #4	
2018	The Guard of Auschwitz	Klaus	
2019	The Cloaking	Doctor Michael Thompson	
2019	Once Upon a Time in London	Detective Rogers	
2019	13 Graves	Len	
2019	I Know What You Did	Michael Downey	
2019	The Angel of Auschwitz	Josef Mengele Senior	
2019	Abatement	Andrew	
2019	Pentagram	Oliver	
2019	Lucas and Albert	Tony Mac	
2019	A Midwinter Night's Dream	The Vicar	Short film
2021	Splinter	Bobby	
2021	Jekyll and Hyde	Henry Jekyll / Mr Hyde	
2022	Darkheart Manor	Buck Darrenson	
2022	Prizefighter: The Life of Jem Belcher	Frank the Bomber	
2022	Reset	Doctor Frank	Short film
2023	Trafficking	The Duke	
2023	A New Breed of Criminal	Vic	
2023	The New Housekeeper	Leading Detective	
2023	Thieves in the Night	Mike	
2024	War Blade	—N/a	
2025	Treasures of Terror Vol 3	Vicar	

=== Television ===
Year	Title	Role	Notes
1996, 1997, 1999, 2001, 2010	The Bill	Various	7 episodes
1996	Madson	Ray McGreevy	1 episode
1996	Thief Takers	Jones	Episode: "Nasty Boys"
1997	Supply & Demand	Police Observer	Television film
1997	The Vanishing Man	Steve	Television film
1998	Animal Ark	Jude Somers	Episode: "Donkey on the Doorstep"
1999	Kavanagh QC	Clifford Luscombe	Episode: "End Game"
1999	CI5: The New Professionals	Phoenix	Episode: "Phoenix"
2000	Lock, Stock...	Terry Gardner	Episode: "...And Two Sips"
2000	Urban Gothic	Dr. Stillman	Episode: "Cry Wolf"
2002	NCS: Manhunt	Lee Wilde	Recurring role
2003	A Touch of Frost	Flynn	Episode: "Hidden Truth"
2003	Danielle Cable: Eyewitness	Terry Cable	Television film
2003–2005	Murder Investigation Team	Trevor Hands	Main role
2004	EastEnders	Carter	Guest role
2005	Holby City	Billy Andrews	Episode: "Dignity"
2005	Blessed	Ronnie	Main role
2005–2006	Totally Frank	David	Recurring role
2006–2008	Doctors	Nick West	Regular role
2008–2011	Emmerdale	Nick Henshall	Regular role
2009	Myths	Daedalus	Episode: "The Fall of Icarus"
2013	Casualty	Paul Rivers	Episode: "Three's a Crowd"
2013	Marple	Frank Stanford	Episode: "Endless Night"
2015	Cradle to Grave	Joey Churcher	1 episode
2016	Obsession: Dark Desires	Bill	Episode: "The Devil in the Pews"
2017	Brussel	Gordon	Recurring role
2018	Shakespeare & Hathaway: Private Investigators	Len Tekler	Episode: "The Rascal Cook"
2019	Vera	Michael Claythorpe	Episode: "The Seagull"
2021	The Engineering That Built the World	Joseph Strauss	Episode: "Battle of the Bridges"
2025	Juice	Brian	Recurring role, series 2

== Awards and nominations ==
Year	Ceremony	Category	Nominated work	Result
2006	British Soap Awards	Sexiest Male	Doctors	Nominated
2007	British Soap Awards	Sexiest Male	Doctors	Nominated
2008	British Soap Awards	Sexiest Male	Doctors	Nominated
2009	British Soap Awards	Best Exit	Doctors	Nominated
