= A Liar's Autobiography: The Untrue Story of Monty Python's Graham Chapman =

2012 British film by Bill Jones, Jeff Simpson, and Ben Timlett

- tiff poster
- Directed by: Bill Jones; Jeff Simpson; Ben Timlett
- Written by: David Sherlock
- Based on: A Liar's Autobiography: Volume VI by: Graham Chapman; David Sherlock
- Produced by: Bill Jones; Ben Timlett
- Starring: Graham Chapman; Terry Gilliam; John Cleese; Michael Palin; Terry Jones
- Edited by: Bill Jones
- Music by: John Greswell; Christopher Murphy Taylor
- Production companies: Bill and Ben Productions
- Distributed by: Trinity Filmed Entertainment (UK); Brainstorm Media (US)
- Release dates: 8 September 2012 (tiff); 8 February 2013 (U.K.)
- Running time: 85 minutes
- Country: United Kingdom
- Language: English
- Box office: $5,102

A Liar's Autobiography: The Untrue Story of Monty Python's Graham Chapman is a 2012 British animated semi-biographical comedy film that is a portrayal of the life of Monty Python alumnus Graham Chapman. The film is loosely based on A Liar's Autobiography: Volume VI, a book written by Chapman and David Sherlock. It received a limited theatrical release on 2 November 2012 in the United States, and aired on the Epix TV channel on the same day.

== Voice cast ==
- Graham Chapman as himself
- Terry Gilliam as Graham's psychiatrist
- John Cleese as David Frost
- Michael Palin as Graham's father
- Terry Jones as Graham's mother
- Cameron Diaz as Sigmund Freud
- Philip Bulcock as David Sherlock
- Justin McDonald as young David Sherlock
- André Jacquemin as himself
- Margarita Doyle as Sylvia Kristel

Various characters voiced by Palin, Jones, Cleese, Carol Cleveland, and Stephen Fry.

== Production ==
In June 2011, it was announced that Bill and Ben Productions were making A Liar's Autobiography, an animated 3D film based on the memoir. The full name is A Liar's Autobiography: The Untrue Story of Monty Python's Graham Chapman. Although not a Monty Python film, all but one of the then-remaining Pythons were involved in the project. Asked what was true in a deliberately fanciful account by Chapman of his life, Terry Jones joked: "Nothing... it's all a downright, absolute, blackguardly lie."

The film uses Chapman's own voice—from a reading of his autobiography shortly before he died of cancer—and entertainment channel EPIX announced that the film was produced in both 2D and 3D formats. Produced and directed by London-based Bill Jones, Jeff Simpson, and Ben Timlett, the film used 14 animation companies, each working on chapters that range from 3 to 12 minutes in length, with each chapter in a different style similar to Opéra imaginaire.

John Cleese recorded dialogue which was matched with Chapman's voice. Michael Palin voiced Chapman's father and Terry Jones voiced his mother. Terry Gilliam voiced his psychiatrist. They all play various other roles. Among the original Python group, only Eric Idle was not involved, although he can be seen during footage of John Cleese's eulogy at Chapman's memorial service near the end of the film.

== Release ==
A Liar's Autobiography was first screened at the 2012 Toronto International Film Festival in September 2012 and premiered in the UK on 16 October 2012 as part of the BFI London Film Festival. The film's official trailer claims that Chapman said, "This is the best film I've been in since I died."

== Reception ==
The film received mixed reviews from critics. As of March 2024, it holds a 44% approval rating on Rotten Tomatoes, based on 50 reviews with an average rating of 5/10. On Metacritic, the film has a 45/100 rating, signifying "mixed or average reviews".
