= Someone's Daughter, Someone's Son =

2024 documentary film

- Film release poster
- Directed by: Lorna Tucker
- Produced by: Claire Lewis, Christopher Hird
- Narrated by: Colin Firth
- Cinematography: Sam Brown
- Edited by: David Potter
- Music by: Robin Schlochtermeier
- Production company: Dartmouth Films
- Release date: 8 February 2024 (United Kingdom)
- Running time: 86 minutes
- Country: United Kingdom
- Language: English

Someone's Daughter, Someone's Son is a 2024 British documentary film on homelessness. Directed by Lorna Tucker, who herself slept rough as a teenager, the film features interviews with former and current rough sleepers. The UK premiere of the film took place at the Tyneside Cinema in Newcastle on 8 February 2024 and was followed by nationwide release on 16 February 2024.

== Synopsis ==
The documentary started as a project during COVID-19 lockdown following a conversation between Tucker and Big Issue founder John Bird. Writing in The Independent, Tucker described the project as "Not making another film about homelessness, or portraits of homeless people", explaining that "This was to be a film about solutions. Made by people with lived experience, looking at how the different experiences that we have in life can lead to different problems. It is about how homelessness happens, and how that experience is so different for every individual. But also it is about those that survive it and go on to have lives, those ones that were so badly written off."

The people who share their stories in the documentary include Darren, Emma and Laura from London, Jamie from Glasgow and Earl from South Shields as well as Tucker herself. The documentary also shows examples of help given to those who are homeless and features interviews with various figures involved in tackling homelessness.

A Kickstarter campaign was launched to raise money to distribute the film. The goal was to show the film not only in cinemas, but also in community screenings around the UK.

Canadian singer-songwriter Bryan Adams recorded a song, also titled Someone's Daughter, Someone's Son, that is played at the end of the film.

== Reception ==
Sophie Monks Kaufman of Time Out wrote that "Someone’s Daughter, Someone’s Son wears its heart on its sleeve. It’s a passionate documentary that asks whether we see our homeless population as worthy of equal rights – and whether we even see them in the first place."

Cath Clarke of The Guardian stated that "Tucker works a kind of empathy miracle. Maybe it’s the questions she asks. Or the way she is there, not peering in, but eye level with her subjects, not talking to them as victims, but people with pasts and – fingers crossed – futures."
