= Livia Giuggioli Firth =

Italian activist (born 1969)

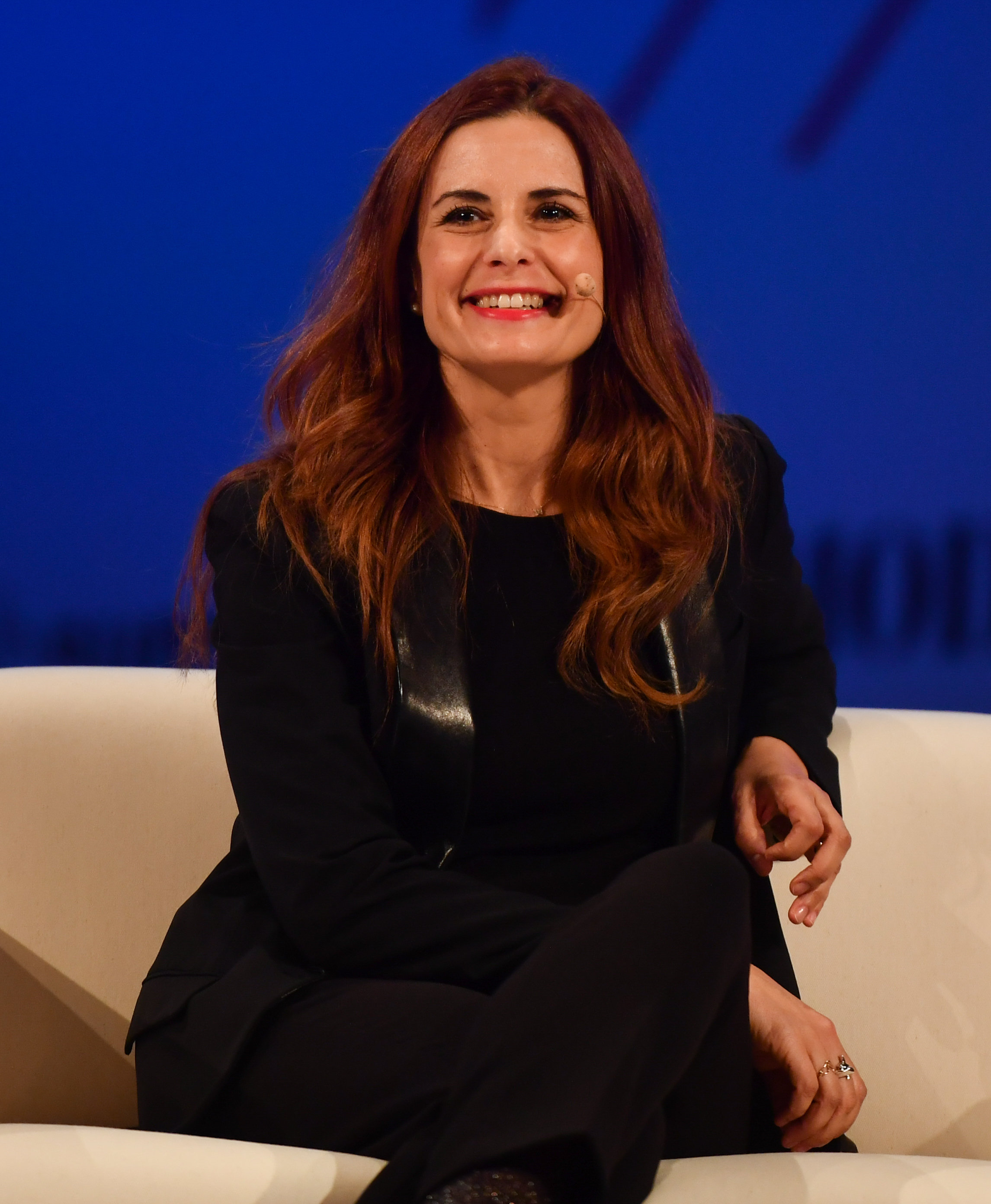
- Born: Livia Giuggioli; 4 September 1969 (age 56); Rome, Italy
- Occupation: Activist
- Spouses: Colin Firth (m. 1997; div. 2021): Callum Grieve
- Children: 2

Livia Giuggioli Firth (born 4 September 1969) is an Italian activist. She is an advocate for sustainability, especially in the fashion industry, where she created the Green Carpet Fashion Award. She also produced the film In Prison My Whole Life.

In 2019, she was awarded with a MBE for services to sustainable fashion. In 2025, she announced she would be returning the MBE to protest US president Donald Trump's state visit to the UK.

== Personal life ==
In 1997, Giuggioli married English actor Colin Firth. They have two sons, Luca and Matteo. They announced their separation in 2019, and divorced in 2021. In November 2025, Giuggioli confirmed she had married Callum Grieve.

Giuggioli runs Quintosapore, a sustainable farm on the Tuscan-Umbrian border. She co-founded it with Alessandro and Nicola, her twin brothers.
