= Winter Ridge =

- Official poster
- Directed by: Dom Lenoir
- Screenplay by: Ross Owen Williams
- Produced by: Nancy Bressolles; Chris Hardman; Matt Hookings; Dom Lenoir
- Starring: Matt Hookings; Michael McKell; Olwen Catherine Kelly; Hannah Waddingham; Justin McDonald; Alan Ford
- Cinematography: Joao da Silva
- Edited by: Barry Moen
- Music by: Paul Saunderson
- Production companies: Camelot Films; Chris.Hardman Pictures; Nice One Film
- Distributed by: Phoenix Worldwide Entertainment
- Release date: 9 February 2018 (Hollywood Florida Film Festival)
- Running time: 86 minutes
- Country: United Kingdom
- Language: English

Winter Ridge is a 2018 British psychological thriller drama film directed by Dom Lenoir and starring Matt Hookings, Olwen Catherine Kelly, Michael McKell, Hannah Waddingham, Justin McDonald and Alan Ford. It was written by Ross Owen Williams.

== Premise ==
Ryan Barnes (Hookings) is a young detective, dealing with the personal tragedy of his wife being coma-ridden whilst attempting to track down a serial killer who appears to be specifically targeting the vulnerable and elderly.

== Cast ==
- Matt Hookings as Ryan Barnes
- Olwen Catherine Kelly as Jessica
- Hannah Waddingham as Joanne Hill
- Michael McKell as John Faulkner
- Justin McDonald as Tom Harris
- Alan Ford as Dale Jacobs
- Ian Pirie as Mike Evans
- Noeleen Comiskey as Jane Evans
- Ella Road as Amanda Jacobs

== Production ==
Filming took place over 17 days around Lynton and Lynmouth in north Devon, England. Several scenes were shot at Petroc College, allowing local performing arts students an opportunity to be involved in filming.

During an interview with The Breeze, director Lenoir explained his view on hoping to raise awareness of dementia, saying "There are an estimated 50 million people suffering from Alzheimer's worldwide and we hope the film is given the platform it deserves for its subject matter to be heard. I'm hoping that this film will raise an interesting debate on the condition."

== Release ==
The film's distributor, Phoenix Worldwide Entertainment, secured three international territory deals, to North America, Italy and China.

== Reception ==
=== Critical response ===
Entertainment Focus described the film as "an ambitious project by the film-makers that they pull off admirably" Nerdly called the film "polished, stylised, well acted, well written and uses the most of its location". Alan Ford, in particular, was praised for his performance, with UK Film Review noting he "shines in his brief scenes as Dale Jacobs... struggling with his dementia and, consequently, debating whether or not his life is truly worth living." The Guardian was less enthusiastic, reporting "Winter Ridge is the kind of plucky, low-budget British feature one so wants to like" before describing the result as "middling... with decidedly shabby edges"

=== Awards ===
The film won more than a dozen awards at independent film festivals on both sides of the Atlantic, including Best Foreign Film at the Hollywood Florida Film Festival, and Best UK Feature and Best British Film at the London Independent Film Festival.

| Award | Category | Result |
|---|---|---|
| Hollywood Florida Film Festival | Best Actor (Matt Hookings) | Won |
| Hollywood Florida Film Festival | Best Foreign Film | Won |
| London Independent Film Festival | Best UK Feature | Won |
| London Independent Film Festival | Best Low Budget Film | Won |
| London Independent Film Festival | Best No-Budget Feature | Won |
| London Independent Film Festival | Best British Film | Won |
| The Monthly Film Festival | Best Feature Film | Nominated |
| WideScreen Film & Music Video Festival | Best Feature | Won |
| El Dorado Film Festival | Best Feature Film | Won |
| International Film Festival of Wales | Best Feature | Won |
| Los Angeles International Film Festival | Best Feature Film | Won |
