= Distant Shores (British TV series) =

British TV series

- Created by: Caleb Ranson
- Starring: Peter Davison; Samantha Bond; Tristan Gemmill; Emma Fildes; Justin McDonald; Matthew Thomas-Davies; Gareth Thomas
- Opening theme: Nick Bicat
- Composer: Nick Bicat
- Country of origin: United Kingdom
- No. of series: 2
- No. of episodes: 12

Production
- Executive producers: Carolyn Reynolds (series 1); Kieran Roberts (series 2)
- Producer: Sue Pritchard
- Production locations: mainly Craster, Northumberland
- Camera setup: single camera
- Running time: ~ 46:30
- Production companies: Granada Television Ltd. (Granada Manchester)

Original release
- Network: ITV
- Release: 5 January – 9 February 2005

Distant Shores is a comedy-drama first shown in the United Kingdom on ITV in January 2005. Like the similar fish out of water dramedies Northern Exposure and Doc Martin, it focuses on the difficulties of an unwillingly-transplanted metropolitan doctor who is forced to adjust to a rural environment.

== Concept ==
Peter Davison plays successful London plastic surgeon Bill Shore. In a bid to save their marriage, his wife Lisa, played by Samantha Bond, accepts a six-month veterinary research job on a small Northumbrian island, Hildasay. Bill reluctantly agrees to relocate to the island with his wife, daughter and son. The stories revolve around the various ways in which the family adjust to the island and its welcoming, but sometimes peculiar, inhabitants. The dominant themes of series one are Bill's attempts to leave the island, and the tragedy which befalls Lisa as she gradually pursues an adulterous relationship with one of its inhabitants. This overarching storyline is essentially reversed in series two, with Lisa wanting to return to London and Bill considering starting an affair on Hildasay.

== Broadcast history ==
The first series was broadcast in 2005 on ITV. According to one of the show's recurring co-stars, Yvette Rowland, it was "immensely popular", and brought in a viewership of more than 6 million. Canadian press releases put the number slightly lower at 5.2 million, but still called the programme "a major hit for Britain's ITV".

Actual ratings data show both these numbers to be correct, if incomplete. The Broadcasters' Audience Research Board reported that the debut episode of the series was the 20th most popular programme in the United Kingdom for the week ending 9 January 2005, with 7.53 million initial viewers. It was one of only three non-soap operas in the top 20 that week. From this high-water mark, however, the show's audience declined, hovering between 5.2 and 6.2 million viewers. Despite this slip, it usually won its 9 pm time slot. In the last two weeks of the run, however, BBC One won the time slot owing to special programming.

A second series was filmed for the next television season, copyrighted 2006. However, it was not aired in the United Kingdom, resulting in the original run of the programme being only six weeks. Rowland has described ITV's failure to broadcast the second series as "a mystery". Davison himself agreed with Rowland's diagnosis in April 2007 when he expressed puzzlement over the shelving of the show, adding, "There's a fair chance it will never be shown in Britain."

Nevertheless, the second series aired outside the UK. In Australia, it debuted on Seven Network; it was aired on Hallmark Channel in 2009 and repeated in 2011 on 7TWO. In Canada, it premiered on VisionTV, while in the United States, it was initially syndicated to PBS stations for a two-year period from December 2006.

== Critical reception ==
During its initial run, two media reporters for The Guardian concluded much the same thing about the series: that it was "genial" or "very comforting" viewing, but that it was an obvious twin of shows such as Doc Martin and Ballykissangel. The Times agreed, calling the show "an even cosier version of Two Thousand Acres of Sky and Doc Martin", which was "undemanding, predictable and pleasant". Indeed, the similarities to Doc Martin were obvious enough to have crept into pre-launch publicity. Peter Davison responded to the charges in a personality piece in The Journal of Newcastle, saying, "It's only like Doc Martin on paper ... Distant Shores has a completely different tone and feel to it."
