= Lorna Tucker =

British filmmaker

Lorna Tucker (born 1981) is a British filmmaker. Films directed by her include Westwood: Punk, Icon, Activist (2018), Amá (2018), Call Me Kate (2023) and Someone's Daughter, Someone's Son (2024).

== Early life ==
Tucker grew up in Watford, Hertfordshire, with her mother and four siblings. Her parents split up when she was young, and her first stepfather was abusive to her mother. Her second suffered from schizophrenia and was regularly hospitalised. She ran away from home at the age of 15, initially staying with the family of a friend, but later living on the streets for 2 years. After reuniting with her family, she gained a place at art school and later became a model after being scouted by a model agency.

== Career ==
Tucker's first feature film was Westwood: Punk, Icon, Activist, a documentary about British fashion designer Vivienne Westwood. Tucker had followed Westwood for four years and had access to her family and inner circle. The global premiere of the film was at the 2018 Sundance Film Festival.

Tucker's second film of 2018 was Amá, a documentary about the forced sterilization of Native American women. She had travelled to the United States to meet women who had been subjected to the government eugenics program.

American actor Katharine Hepburn was the subject of Tucker's documentary Call Me Kate, which was released in 2023. Tucker had access to previously unheard audio tapes and previously unseen home videos and photographs.

Tucker's experiences of being homeless were the basis of her documentary Someone's Daughter, Someone's Son, where she tells her story and interviews other people who have experienced homelessness. Released in 2024, the documentary is narrated by British actor Colin Firth.

In March 2024, Tucker became an official ambassador of Big Issue Group.
