= Kursk (film) =

2018 film by Thomas Vinterberg

- Theatrical release poster
- Directed by: Thomas Vinterberg
- Screenplay by: Robert Rodat
- Based on: A Time to Die by Robert Moore
- Produced by: Ariel Zeitoun; Patrick Vandenbosch; Christophe Toulemonde; Fabrice Delville; Jérôme de Béthune
- Starring: Matthias Schoenaerts; Léa Seydoux; Artemiy Spiridonov; Colin Firth; Peter Simonischek; August Diehl; Max von Sydow
- Cinematography: Anthony Dod Mantle
- Edited by: Valdís Óskarsdóttir
- Music by: Alexandre Desplat
- Production companies: EuropaCorp; Belga Productions; VIA EST
- Distributed by: EuropaCorp Distribution
- Release dates: September 6, 2018 (TIFF); November 7, 2018 (France)
- Running time: 117 minutes
- Countries: Belgium; France; Luxembourg
- Language: English
- Budget: $40 million
- Box office: at least $6.8 million

Kursk (UK: Kursk: The Last Mission, US: The Command) is a 2018 disaster drama-thriller film directed by Thomas Vinterberg, based on Robert Moore's book A Time to Die, about the true story of the 2000 Kursk submarine disaster. It stars Matthias Schoenaerts, Léa Seydoux, Peter Simonischek, August Diehl, Max von Sydow, and Colin Firth. It was the last of von Sydow's films to be released during his lifetime.

== Plot ==
In August 2000, the Russian Navy's Northern Fleet begins an exercise in the Barents Sea. The fleet deployed includes Kursk, an Oscar-class submarine. At sea, weapons officer Pavel Sonin reports that the interior temperature of a HTP torpedo is increasing rapidly, indicating a potential hydrogen peroxide leak. The captain however ignores Pavel's concerns and moments later the torpedo prematurely explodes, killing the weapons room crew. A secondary explosion of the remaining torpedoes rips a hole through the submarine's forward hull, sending the ship to the sea bed.

The surviving crew members rally at the aft-most compartment, now rapidly taking on water. The crew desperately await rescue, while on dry land the sailors’ wives begin to hear rumours regarding the submarine. Royal Navy Commodore David Russell detects the seismic events and deduces that Kursk has had an accident. Admiral Grudzinsky, commander of the Northern Fleet, initially believes there are no survivors, but immediately tapping is heard through the hull of the submarine and the Russians deploy a rescue submersible. The old and poorly maintained craft cannot form a seal on the Kursk's hull and is forced to return to the surface and wait for a 12-hour battery recharge.

Meanwhile the survivors begin to run low on air, requiring two crew members to swim into a flooded compartment to retrieve oxygen cartridges. Another rescue attempt is made, but the submersible again cannot form a seal on the hull. On land the sailors' families, wives and friends grow resentful of the repeated stone-walling by the Russian Admiralty, who also reject foreign offers of help for fear of exposing Russian naval secrets. Despite this, Admiral Grudzinsky accepts an earlier offer from Russell, but Grudzinsky is relieved of command shortly afterwards. The Russian Navy orders Russell, along with British and Norwegian divers, not to approach the Kursk. A third Russian attempt to rescue the survivors is made, but again the Russian submersible still cannot form a seal and the Russians ultimately and finally agree to foreign assistance.

Aboard the Kursk, the crew, in an attempt to raise morale, enjoy a "breakfast buffet", during which a crew member accidentally knocks an oxygen cartridge into the water, causing a flash fire that consumes the remaining oxygen. With minutes of breathable air, the crew say their goodbyes whilst singing ‘The Sailor's Band’. Russell's divers arrive too late at the submarine, finding the entire hull flooded and the crew dead. At the funeral, Misha, son of one of the sailors on board, refuses to shake Admiral Petrenko's hand. A land-based member of the crew gives Misha his father's maritime watch; his father had earlier sold it so that he could buy champagne for Pavel Sonin's wedding.

== Cast ==
- Matthias Schoenaerts as Captain-Lieutenant Mikhail Averin
- Léa Seydoux as Tanya Averina
- Artemiy Spiridonov as Misha Averin
- Colin Firth as Commodore David Russell
- Peter Simonischek as Admiral Andrey Grudzinsky
- August Diehl as Anton Markov
- Max von Sydow as Admiral Vitaly Petrenko
- Bjarne Henriksen as Captain Nikitin
- Martin Brambach as Captain Gennady Shirokov
- Magnus Millang as Oleg Lebedev
- Matthias Schweighöfer as Pavel Sonin
- Peter Plaugborg as Executive Officer Alexander Grekov
- John Hollingworth as Lieutenant Bruce Hamil
- Steven Waddington as Graham Mann
- Joel Basman as Leo
- Michael Nyqvist as Nesterov
- Pit Bukowski as Maxim
- Tom Hudson as Roman
- Chris Pascal as Niko
- Kristof Coenen as Sasha
- Pernilla August as Aksana
- Helene Reingaard Neumann as Yelena Markova
- Guillaume Kerbusch as Midshipman Alexi Zhukov
- Koen De Sutter as Admiral Ivakin
- Gustaf Hammarsten as Counter-Admiral Mikhail Denisov
- Aske Bang as Lieutenant Pulsky
- Lars Brygmann as Kasyenenko
- Martin Greis-Rosenthal as Ilyushin
- Katrine Greis-Rosenthal as Daria Sonina
- Josse De Pauw as Vadim Markov
- Miglen Mirtchev as Captain Ivan Timoshenko
- Geoffrey Streatfeild as Captain George Delancey
- Mark Irons as Vladimir Laskutin
- Zlatko Buric as Kulkin
- Eva van der Gucht as Irena Lebedeva
- Geoffrey Newland as diver Tony Scott
- Danny Van Meenen as diver Pål Dinessen
- Guido De Craene as Calpin
- Ilyas Hamzi as NATO Officer Green

== Production ==
=== Development ===
On 17 August 2015, it was announced that EuropaCorp was developing a film based on the 2000 K-141 Kursk submarine disaster, and that Martin Zandvliet had been hired to direct the film from a script by Robert Rodat, based on Robert Moore's 2002 book A Time to Die. Kursk would have been Zandvliet's first English-language film. On 21 January 2016, it was reported that Zandvliet was no longer attached and that EuropaCorp had hired Thomas Vinterberg to direct the film.

On 2 March 2016, Matthias Schoenaerts was announced in the cast, reteaming with Vinterberg after Far from the Madding Crowd (2015). Colin Firth joined the cast on 26 May 2016. Léa Seydoux joined the cast on 7 February 2017, in the role of Tanya, the wife of Mikhail Averin, a Russian Navy captain-lieutenant played by Matthias Schoenaerts. Rachel McAdams was once in talks for the role of Tanya. Deadline Hollywood also reported that Firth would play David Russell, a British naval commander going against Russia's warnings to try to save the men on the Kursk.

On 15 March 2017, it was reported that Vladimir Putin's character had been cut from the film before an actor was cast for the role. According to The Hollywood Reporter, EuropaCorp's president, Luc Besson, wanted to shift the story's focus to the rescue mission rather than the politics behind the disaster. One theory noted by The Hollywood Reporter is that nobody at EuropaCorp wanted to be hacked. (The film The Interview had angered Kim Jong-un and was believed to have sparked the Sony hack in 2014.) Putin had been Russian president for eight months when the tragedy had occurred. He was supposed to appear as a supporting character in at least five scenes and was sympathetically portrayed in the original Kursk script, which highlighted why he had taken the tragedy personally (Putin's father had been a submariner).

=== Pre-production ===
On 8 May 2017, Peter Simonischek, Max von Sydow and Michael Nyqvist were announced in the cast. However, Nyqvist died on 27 June.

Alexandre Desplat composed the movie score. The crew includes Catherine Marchand as the costume designer, Anthony Dod Mantle as the director of photography, Thierry Flamand as the production designer and Valdis Oskardottir as the film's editor.

Subject matter experts such as journalist Robert Moore (author of the novel upon which the film is based), David Russell (British Royal Navy commodore who had tried to save the men from the Kursk), and submarine expert Ramsey Martin acted as advisors for the film.

The project was produced by France's EuropaCorp with Belgium's Belga Productions and Luxembourg's VIA EST.

=== Filming ===
Shooting was scheduled to start in September 2016, but it had to be postponed due to Russia's defence ministry not issuing a permit for shooting in the country, which would run for about a month. According to The Hollywood Reporter, Russia's defense ministry originally promised cooperation with the crew to provide realism to the movie. However, later it reportedly grew concerned about granting access to classified information and sensitive locations. On 7 February 2017, ScreenDaily.com reported that shooting was scheduled to start in April.

Filming started at the Naval base of Toulon, France, on 26 April 2017. Some scenes were filmed with Colin Firth at the commercial port of Brest, France, between 2 May and 6 May 2017, including scenes aboard the rescue ship Atlantic Tonjer, serving as the Seaway Eagle. On 8 May 2017, it was reported that shooting would take place not only in France but also in locations throughout Europe, including Belgium and Norway. On 12 July 2017, the crew was in Jette (Brussels) and scenes were filmed in "Salle Excelsior" (Place Cardinal Mercier).

== Release ==
The film premiered at the Toronto International Film Festival on 6 September 2018, where Thomas Vinterberg (director) and Artemiy Spiridonov (actor) presented the film in English and Russian languages. Originally set to be released by STXfilms, the film instead was released through DirecTV Cinema on 23 May 2019, before being released in a limited release on 21 June 2019, by Saban Films.

== Reception ==
On the review aggregator Rotten Tomatoes, the film holds an approval rating of 72%, based on 50 reviews, with an average rating of 6.3/10. The website's consensus reads, "The Command plumbs the depths of real-life disaster to tell an uneven yet reasonably diverting story of lives caught between bureaucracy and certain doom." On Metacritic, the film has a weighted average score of 55 out of 100, based on results from 12 critics, indicating "mixed or average reviews".

== See also ==
- List of submarine films
