= And When Did You Last See Your Father? =

- Theatrical release poster
- Directed by: Anand Tucker
- Written by: David Nicholls
- Based on: And When Did You Last See Your Father? by Blake Morrison
- Produced by: Elizabeth Karlsen; Stephen Woolley
- Starring: Jim Broadbent; Colin Firth; Juliet Stevenson
- Cinematography: Howard Atherton
- Edited by: Trevor Waite
- Music by: Barrington Pheloung
- Production companies: Film4; UK Film Council; EM Media; Tiger Aspect Productions; Bórd Scannán na hÉireann/Irish Film Board; European Development Fund
- Distributed by: Buena Vista International
- Release date: 5 October 2007
- Running time: 92 minutes
- Countries: United Kingdom; Ireland
- Language: English
- Box office: $2.7 million

And When Did You Last See Your Father? is a 2007 drama film directed by Anand Tucker. The screenplay by David Nicholls is based on the 1993 memoir of the same title by Blake Morrison.

== Plot ==
While Blake Morrison, his mother, and younger sister Gillian tend to his father, Arthur, on his deathbed in his Yorkshire home, Blake has a series of flashbacks of moments he shared with his father. Despite Blake's success as a writer, poet, and critic, his father – a rural general practitioner – never accepted his decision to pursue a literary career or acknowledged his achievements.

Bullying, blustery, and boorish, Arthur blunders his way through fatherhood, regularly calling his son a fathead and intruding into the boy's private moments with a sense of entitlement. He has a penchant for exaggeration when he is not telling outright lies, and publicly humiliates his long-suffering wife Kim with his shameless flirting with various women and an affair with Beaty, a friend of the family.

At other times, he seems genuinely interested in bonding with his son, taking him camping so they can test supposedly waterproof sleeping bags he has made or allowing him to practise driving in the family's Alvis convertible on a wide expanse of deserted beach with reckless abandon. As a result, Blake is left with mixed feelings for his father, ranging from deeply rooted anger to compassionate acceptance. Only after Arthur's death is he able to set aside his resentment and recognise him as someone whose flaws ultimately helped mould his son into the better man he is.

== Cast ==
- Jim Broadbent as Arthur Morrison
- Colin Firth as Blake Morrison
- Juliet Stevenson as Kim Morrison
- Gina McKee as Kathy Morrison
- Claire Skinner as Gillian
- Sarah Lancashire as Beaty
- Matthew Beard as Blake as a teenager
- Elaine Cassidy as Sandra
- Justin McDonald as Steve
- Carey Mulligan as Rachel
- Bradley Johnson as Blake as a child
- Rhiannon Howden as Sophie Morrison

== Production ==
The film was shot on location in Brighton in East Sussex; Chichester, Goodwood, Petworth, and West Wittering in West Sussex; Bakewell, Cromford, Kedleston, and Snake Pass in Derbyshire; the National Liberal Club in Westminster, London; Sheffield in South Yorkshire; Flintham in Nottinghamshire; and Yorkshire Dales in North Yorkshire. Interiors were filmed at the Twickenham Film Studios in Middlesex.

The film premiered at the Galway Film Festival in July 2007 and was shown at the Edinburgh Film Festival, the Telluride Film Festival, the Toronto International Film Festival, the Edmonton International Film Festival, and the Dinard Festival of British Cinema before going into theatrical release in the UK, Ireland, and Malta on 5 October 2007. It then was shown at the Rome Film Festival, the Cairo International Film Festival, the Dubai International Film Festival, the Miami International Film Festival, and the Ashland Independent Film Festival before going into limited release in the US on 6 June 2008.

== Critical reception ==
The film received generally favourable reviews. Rotten Tomatoes reported 72% of critics gave the film positive reviews, based on 101 reviews, with the website's critics consensus reading, "Sensitive to a fault, Tucker's adaptation of the Morrison novel is nonetheless solidly scripted and well-acted; guard your heartstrings."

Peter Bradshaw of The Guardian rated the film four out of five stars, calling it "an intelligent and heartfelt film" and one that "deserves to be seen."

Philip French of The Observer said the film "touches movingly, enlighteningly on universal matters we can all identify with, and it does so without ever getting maudlin or sentimental."

Damon Smith of the Manchester Evening News called the film "a bittersweet and, at times, moving account of the strained family ties which define each and every one of us."

Manohla Dargis of The New York Times called the film "A gentle tale gently told" and "grown-up, civilized fare" and added, "If that sounds like a compliment, it is, even though the whole thing might have been improved with a bit of messiness, a little vulgarity to leaven its tastefulness and tact. This isn't a groundbreaking work; just a smartly played story, enlivened by drama and spiked with passion, the very thing that thinking audiences pine for, especially during the summer spectacle season when theaters are clogged with sticky kids' stuff and television reruns."

Roger Ebert of the Chicago Sun-Times observed, "It's a sad movie, with a mournful score, romantic landscape photography and heartbreaking deathbed scenes . . . But it's not very satisfying . . . The film did not provide me with fulfillment or a catharsis . . . This is a film of regret, and judging by what we see of the characters, it deserves to be."

Walter Addiego of the San Francisco Chronicle said, "This classy tearjerker is worth seeing more for its virtuoso acting than for its bare-bones tale of how a sensitive man copes with the death of his domineering father. The film is cleanly and intelligently made, and, excepting a few moments toward the end, it's moving without being mawkish. While you might leave the theater feeling the picture finally doesn't quite have the dramatic heft it should, it offers plenty of compensations along the way."

Derek Elley of Variety called the film "immaculately acted, professionally helmed and saturated in period British atmosphere," "an unashamed tearjerker that's all wrapping and no center," and "undeniably effective at a gut level despite its dramatic shortcomings." He added, "[B]y never getting to the heart of the matter, nor having even one scene where father and son really talk, the movie has a big black hole at its core. In the smorgasbord of father-son relationship pics, this one is very low-cal."

== Awards and nominations ==
The film was nominated for seven British Independent Film Awards, including Best British Independent Film, Best Actor (Jim Broadbent), Best Supporting Actor (Colin Firth), Most Promising Newcomer (Matthew Beard), Best Director, and Best Screenplay.

Jim Broadbent was nominated for the London Film Critics Circle Award for Best Actor but lost to Daniel Day-Lewis in There Will Be Blood.

Elaine Cassidy was nominated for the Irish Film & Television Award for Best Actress in a Supporting Film Role but lost to Saoirse Ronan in Atonement.

== DVD release ==
The Region 1 DVD was released on 4 November 2008. The film is in anamorphic widescreen format with an audio track in English and subtitles in French and Spanish. Bonus features include commentary by director Anand Tucker, deleted scenes, and the original trailer.
