= Murder of Bijan Ebrahimi =

2013 murder in the United Kingdom

Bijan Ebrahimi (Persian: بیژن ابراهیمی; c. 1969 – 14 July 2013) was an Iranian refugee living in Bristol, South West England. For seven years, the 44-year-old disabled man had reported death threats and racial abuse from his neighbours.

On 14 July 2013, Ebrahimi was murdered by his neighbour, Lee James. James had falsely accused Ebrahimi of being a paedophile (when in fact he had merely been recording evidence of threats and antisocial behaviour, since the police had dismissed them) and then beat Ebrahimi to death, later dragging Ebrahimi's body to his home's front yard and setting fire to it. James was convicted and jailed for life. His accomplice was sentenced to four-year imprisonment.

Considered a case of institutional racism, the case drew international media attention. An independent review concluded that Bristol City Council and the police were guilty of institutional racism in dealings with Bijan Ebrahimi. Four police and community officers were fired and two were jailed.

== Events ==
Bristol resident, and physically disabled Iranian refugee, Bijan Ebrahimi, complained that he was being frequently harassed by some of his neighbours. To provide evidence, he began filming them. While filming his neighbour Lee James drinking beer and playing with his young daughter, James noticed Ebrahimi filming them, and accused Ebrahimi of filming his daughter for his sexual gratification. James subsequently attacked Ebrahimi, and told his neighbours that he believed Ebrahimi to be a paedophile.

Ebrahimi called the police who arrived to find a homicidally enraged James, but decided to instead arrest Ebrahimi because they found him difficult. While being led away under arrest, an angry crowd which had gathered outside Ebrahimi's house cheered the policemen because they believed that Ebrahimi had been arrested for paedophilia. After being arrested, the officers treated Ebrahimi's concerns for his own safety with open contempt before housing him a few miles from his previous home.

James found out about Ebrahimi's new home and began trying to murder him. Ebrahimi made many attempts to contact the police, but the police chose to ignore his pleas. While Ebrahimi was trying to flee, he was intercepted by James, who beat him to death. A neighbour of James provided alcohol to help burn Ebrahimi's body. When the police arrived, Ebrahimi's body was still burning.
