= List of awards and nominations received by Colin Firth =

Colin Firth awards and nominations
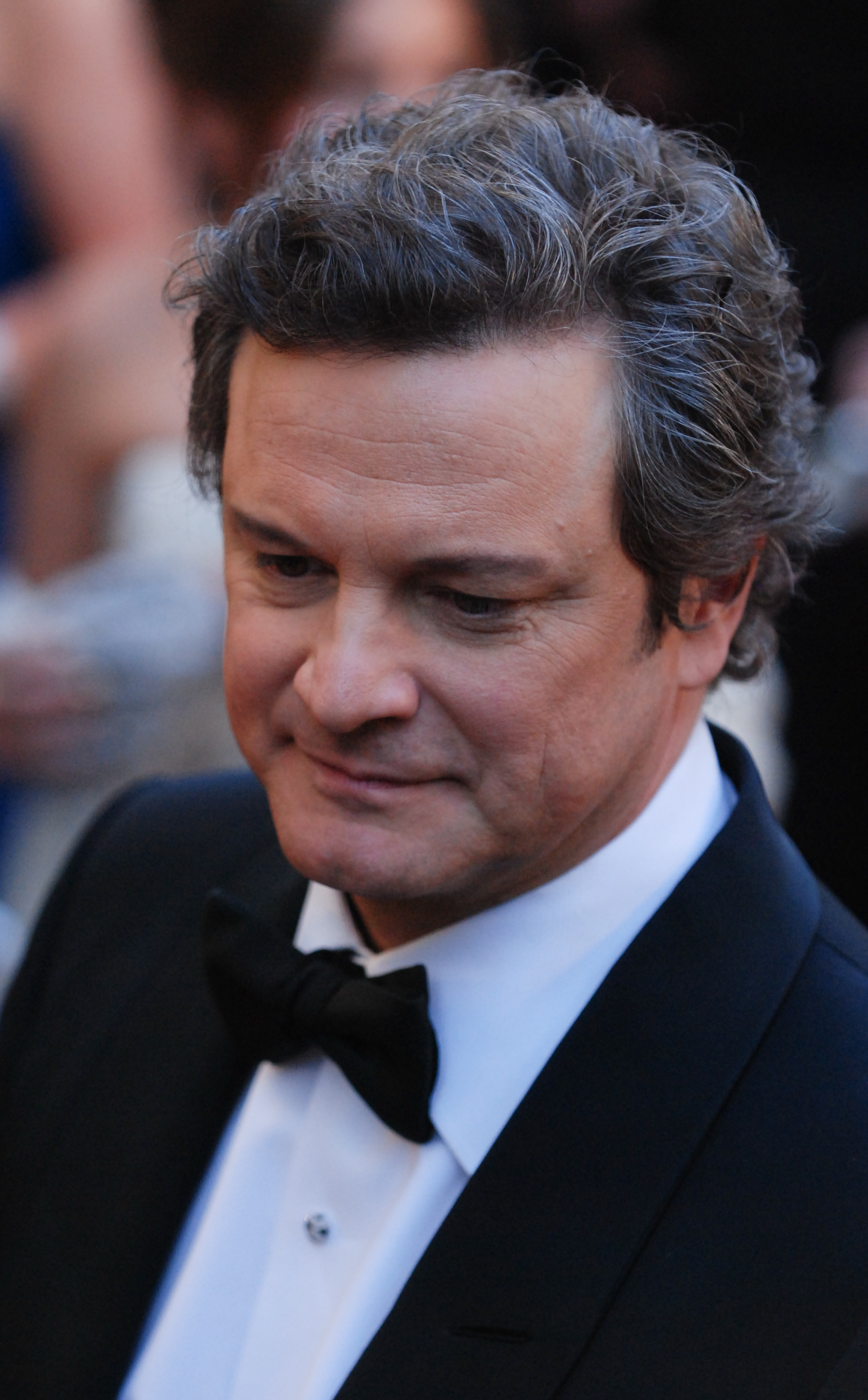
- Firth at the 83rd Academy Awards in 2011
Awards and nominations
Award	Wins	Nominations
Academy Awards	1	2
British Academy Film Awards	2	5
Primetime Emmy Awards	0	2
Golden Globe Awards	1	3
Screen Actors Guild Awards	3	5

Totals (Note: Certain award groups do not simply award one winner. They acknowledge several different recipients, have runners-up, and have third place. Since this is a specific recognition and is different from losing an award, runner-up mentions are considered wins in this award tally. For simplification and to avoid errors, each award in this list has been presumed to have had a prior nomination.)
- Wins: –
- Nominations: –

The following article is a List of awards and nominations received by Colin Firth.

Colin Firth is an English actor known for his roles in film, television, and theatre. Over his career has received an Academy Award, two BAFTA Awards, a Golden Globe Award and three Screen Actors Guild Awards as well as nominations for two Primetime Emmy Awards.

Firth received the Academy Award for Best Actor for his portrayal as King George VI in Tom Hooper's historical drama The King's Speech (2010). The performance also earned him the BAFTA Award for Best Actor in a Leading Role, the Golden Globe Award for Best Actor in a Motion Picture – Drama, and the Screen Actors Guild Award for Outstanding Actor in a Leading Role. He was previously Oscar-nominated for playing a gay man who lost a long-time partner in the romantic drama A Single Man (2009), which also earned him the BAFTA Award and the Volpi Cup for Best Actor.

He also received three British Academy Film Award nominations for his performances in the romantic comedy Bridget Jones's Diary (2000), the romantic drama A Single Man (2009), and the historical drama The King's Speech (2010), winning for the later two. He received Screen Actors Guild Award for Outstanding Cast in a Motion Picture nominations for the romantic epic drama The English Patient (1996), and the romantic period comedy-drama Shakespeare in Love (1998), before winning for the historical drama The King's Speech (2010).

For his work on television, he received two British Academy Television Award nominations for his roles in the BBC projects Tumbledown (1989), and Pride and Prejudice (1996) as well as two Primetime Emmy Award nominations for Outstanding Supporting Actor in a Limited Series or Movie for his role as Dr. Wilhelm Stuckart in the BBC / HBO film Conspiracy (2001), and Outstanding Lead Actor in a Limited Series or Movie for playing Michael Peterson the HBO limited series The Staircase (2022). For the later he also received a Golden Globe Award nomination.

Firth was made a Commander of the Order of the British Empire (CBE) by Queen Elizabeth II in 2011. He was named by Time Magazine as one of the 100 most influential people in the world that same year. He has received various honorary awards including the Britannia Awards Humanitarian Award in 2009 and the Telluride Film Festival's Silver Medallion Award in 2010. He received a Motion Picture star on the Hollywood Walk of Fame in 2011.

== Major associations ==
=== Academy Awards ===
Year	Category	Nominated work	Result	Ref.
2010	Best Actor	A Single Man	Nominated	
2011	Best Actor	The King's Speech	Won	

=== Actor Awards ===
Year	Category	Nominated work	Result	Ref.
1997	Outstanding Cast in a Motion Picture	The English Patient	Nominated	
1999	Outstanding Cast in a Motion Picture	Shakespeare in Love	Won	
2010	Outstanding Actor in a Leading Role	A Single Man	Nominated	
2011	Outstanding Cast in a Motion Picture	The King's Speech	Won	
2011	Outstanding Actor in a Leading Role	The King's Speech	Won	

=== BAFTA Awards ===
Year	Category	Nominated work	Result	Ref.
British Academy Film Awards
2002	Best Actor in a Supporting Role	Bridget Jones's Diary	Nominated	
2010	Best Actor in a Leading Role	A Single Man	Won	
2011	Best Actor in a Leading Role	The King's Speech	Won	
British Academy Television Awards
1989	Best Actor	Tumbledown	Nominated	
1996	Best Actor	Pride and Prejudice	Nominated	
2026	Best Actor	Lockerbie: A Search for Truth	Nominated	

=== Critics' Choice Awards ===
Year	Category	Nominated work	Result	Ref.
Critics' Choice Movie Awards
2010	Best Actor	A Single Man	Nominated	
2011	Best Actor	The King's Speech	Won	

=== Emmy Awards ===
Year	Category	Nominated work	Result	Ref.
Primetime Emmy Awards
2001	Outstanding Supporting Actor in a Miniseries or Movie	Conspiracy	Nominated	
2022	Outstanding Lead Actor in a Limited Series or Movie	The Staircase	Nominated	

=== Golden Globe Awards ===
Year	Category	Nominated work	Result	Ref.
2010	Best Actor – Motion Picture Drama	A Single Man	Nominated	
2011	Best Actor – Motion Picture Drama	The King's Speech	Won	
2023	Best Actor – Miniseries or Television Film	The Staircase	Nominated	

== Miscellaneous awards ==
Organizations	Year	Category	Work	Result	Ref.
Dorian Awards	2009	Film Performance of the Year	A Single Man	Won	
European Film Awards	2011	Best Actor	The King's Speech	Won	
People's Choice Awards	2008	Favorite Cast (shared with Meryl Streep, Amanda Seyfried, Pierce Brosnan, and Stellan Skarsgard)	Mamma Mia!	Nominated	
Venice Film Festival	2009	Volpi Cup for Best Actor	A Single Man	Won	

== Honorary awards ==
Organizations	Year	Honor	Result	Ref.
Britannia Awards	2009	Humanitarian Award	Honored	
Telluride Film Festival	2010	Silver Medallion Award	Honored	
Queen Elizabeth II	2011	Commander of the Order of the British Empire (CBE)	Honored	
Time Magazine	2011	100 most influential people in the world	Honored	
Hollywood Walk of Fame	2011	Motion Picture Star	Honored	
National Film Awards	2018	Global Contribution to Motion Pictures	Honored	
Dublin International Film Festival	2021	Volta Award	Honored	
