= Hen Pearce =

English bare-knuckle boxer (1777–1809)

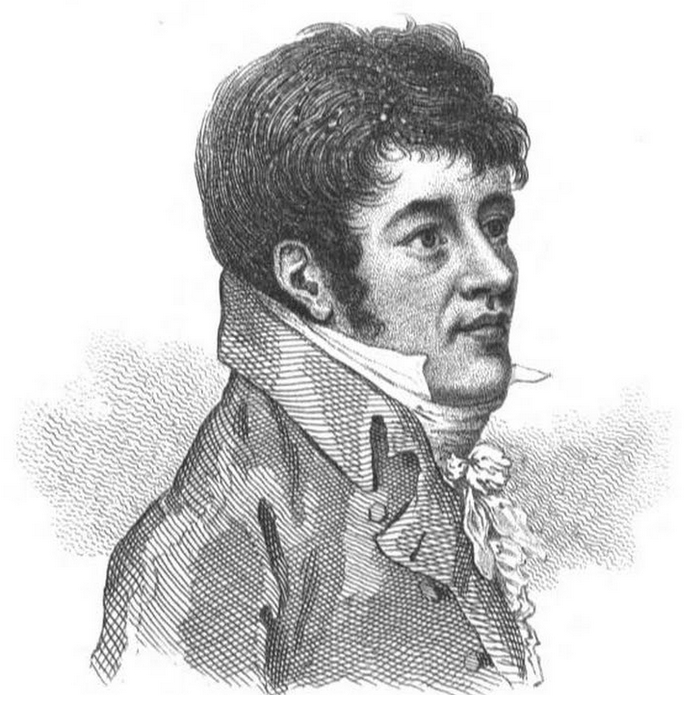

Henry "Hen" Pearce (7 May 1777, in Bristol – 30 April 1809, at St. Martin's Lane, London) was an English bare-knuckle prizefighter who fought under the London Prize Ring rules and was the recognised English Champion from 1804 until his retirement due to ill health in 1807.

Pearce was known as "The Game Chicken", a nickname probably derived from his habit of signing his name "Hen" instead of Henry. He was reckoned a fast, skillful boxer who hit hard with both fists.

On 6 December 1805, Pearce defeated Jem Belcher in a Championship decider (a fight reported in Pierce Egan's first volume of Boxiana).

He was inducted into the Ring Boxing Hall of Fame in 1987 and the International Boxing Hall of Fame in 1993.

== External Sources ==
- Chapter on Pearce in Boxiana, or Sketches of Ancient and Modern Pugilism volume 1, 1830, Pierce Egan
- Chapter on Pearce in Pugilistica, the History of British Boxing volume 1, 1906, Henry Downes Miles

== See also ==
- List of bare-knuckle boxers
