= Colin Firth =

English actor and producer (born 1960)

Colin Firth CBE
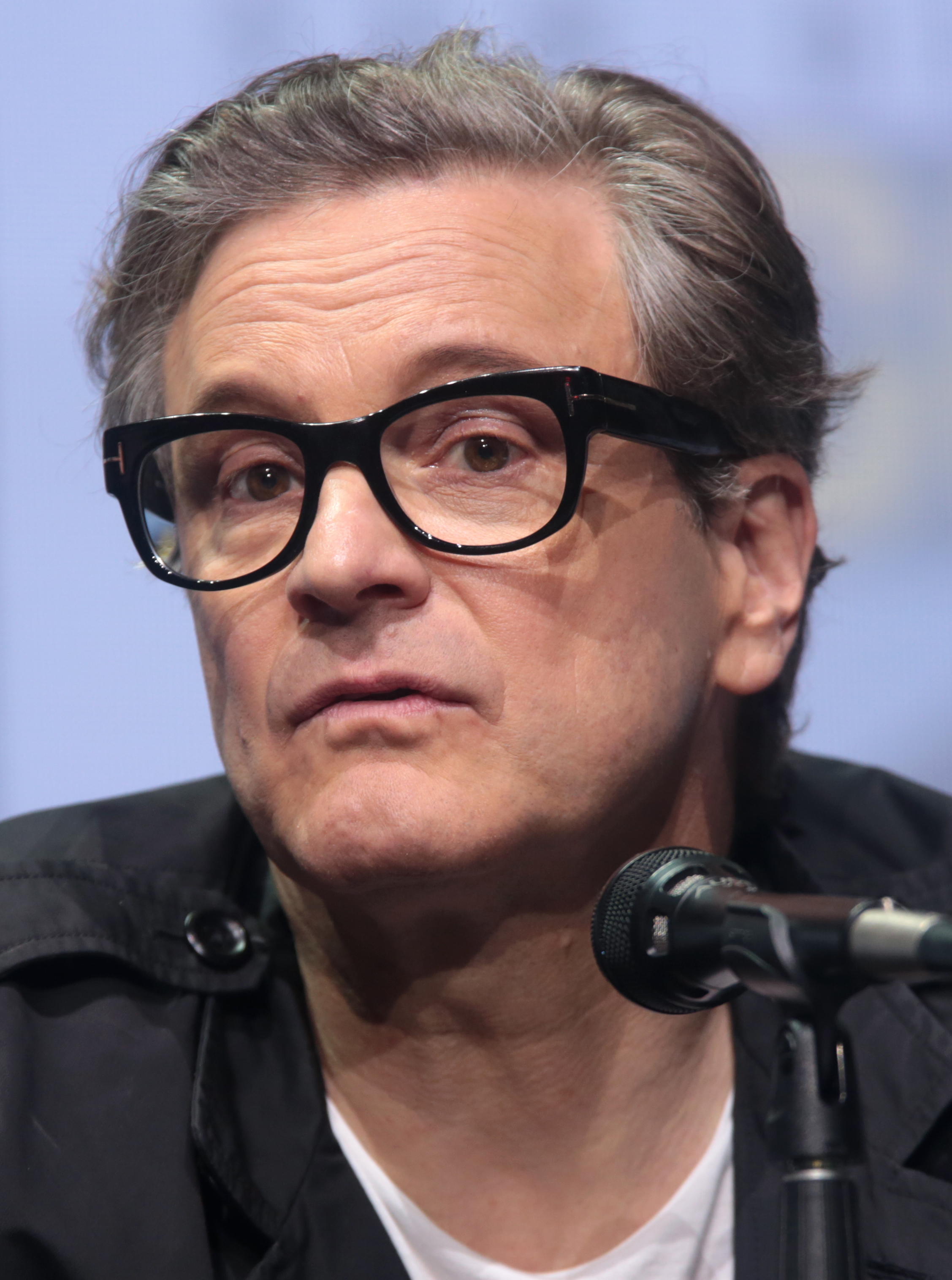
- Firth at the 2017 San Diego Comic Con
- Born: Colin Andrew Firth; 10 September 1960 (age 66); Grayshott, Hampshire, England
- Citizenship: United Kingdom; Italy (since 2017)
- Education: National Youth Theatre; Drama Centre London
- Occupations: Actor; producer
- Years active: 1983–present
- Works: Full list
- Spouse: Livia Giuggioli (m. 1997; div. 2021)
- Partner: Meg Tilly (1989–1994)
- Children: 3
- Relatives: Kate Firth (sister); Jonathan Firth (brother)
- Awards: Full list

Colin Andrew Firth (born 10 September 1960) is an English actor and producer. He was identified in the mid-1980s with the "Brit Pack" of rising young British actors before gaining leading roles as well as numerous accolades, including an Academy Award, two British Academy Film Awards, a Golden Globe Award, and a Volpi Cup as well as nominations for two Primetime Emmy Awards and three British Academy Television Awards. In 2011, Firth was appointed a CBE for his services to drama, and appeared in Time magazine's 100 most influential people in the world.

For his portrayal of King George VI in the historical drama The King's Speech (2010) he earned the Academy Award for Best Actor. He was previously Oscar-nominated for playing a grieving gay man in the romantic drama A Single Man (2009), which earned him the BAFTA Award and the Volpi Cup for Best Actor. Firth is also known for his roles in A Month in the Country (1987), Tumbledown (1988), Valmont (1989), The English Patient (1996), Shakespeare in Love (1998), The Importance of Being Earnest (2002), and Love Actually (2003).

Firth portrayed Mark Darcy in the Bridget Jones film series (2001–2025), Harry Bright in the musical comedy Mamma Mia! (2008) and its 2018 sequel, and secret agent Harry Hart in Kingsman: The Secret Service (2014) and its 2017 sequel. He also took roles in Tinker Tailor Soldier Spy (2011), Mary Poppins Returns (2018), 1917 (2019), The Secret Garden (2020), Operation Mincemeat (2021), and Disclosure Day (2026).

On television, he earned stardom and acclaim for his portrayal of Mr. Darcy in the BBC television adaptation of Jane Austen's Pride and Prejudice (1995). He was Primetime Emmy Award-nominated for his portrayals of Dr Wilhelm Stuckart in the BBC film Conspiracy (2001), and Michael Peterson in the HBO limited series The Staircase (2022). In 2012, he founded the production company Raindog Films, under which he served as a producer for Eye in the Sky (2015) and Loving (2016). His films have grossed more than $3 billion from 42 releases worldwide.

== Early life and education ==
Colin Andrew Firth was born on 10 September 1960 in the village of Grayshott, Hampshire, to parents who were academics and teachers. His mother, Shirley Jean (née Rolles), was a comparative religion lecturer at King Alfred's College (now the University of Winchester); and his father, David Norman Lewis Firth, was a history lecturer at King Alfred's and education officer for the Nigerian government. Firth is the eldest of three children; his sister Kate is an actress and voice coach, and his brother Jonathan is also an actor. His maternal grandparents were Congregationalist ministers and his paternal grandfather was an Anglican priest. They did overseas missionary work, and both of his parents were born and spent part of their childhoods in India.

As a child, Firth frequently travelled due to his parents' work, spending some years in Nigeria. He also lived in St. Louis, Missouri, when he was 11, which he has described as "a difficult time". On returning to England, he attended the Montgomery of Alamein Secondary School (now Kings' School, Winchester), which at the time was a state comprehensive school in Winchester, Hampshire. He was still an outsider and the target of bullying. To counter this, he adopted the local working-class Hampshire accent and copied his schoolmates' lack of interest in schoolwork.

Firth began attending drama workshops at age 10, and by 14 had decided to be a professional actor. Until further education, he was not academically inclined, later saying in an interview, "I didn't like school. I just thought it was boring and mediocre and nothing they taught me seemed to be of any interest at all." However, at Barton Peveril Sixth Form College in Eastleigh, he was imbued with a love of English literature by an enthusiastic teacher, Penny Edwards, and has said that his two years there were among the happiest of his life.

After his sixth form years, Firth moved to London and joined the National Youth Theatre, where he made many contacts and got a job in the wardrobe department at the National Theatre. He subsequently studied at Drama Centre London.

== Career ==
=== 1983–1995: Early work and breakthrough ===
Firth played Hamlet in the Drama Centre end-of-year production, and in 1984, Firth made his film debut as Tommy Judd, Guy Bennett's straight, Marxist school friend in the screen adaptation of the play Another Country (with Rupert Everett as Guy Bennett). It was the start of a longstanding public feud between Firth and Everett, which was eventually resolved. He was the lead in Camille (1984) with John Gielgud & Ben Kingsley. He starred with Sir Laurence Olivier in Lost Empires (1986), a TV adaptation of J. B. Priestley's novel.

In 1987, Firth and other up-and-coming British actors such as Tim Roth, Bruce Payne and Paul McGann were dubbed the 'Brit Pack'. That year, he appeared with Kenneth Branagh in the film version of J. L. Carr's A Month in the Country. Sheila Johnston observed a theme in his early work of playing those traumatised by war. He portrayed real-life British soldier Robert Lawrence MC in the 1988 BBC dramatisation Tumbledown. Lawrence was severely injured at the Battle of Mount Tumbledown during the Falklands War, and the film details his struggles to adjust to his disability whilst confronted with indifference from the government and public. It attracted controversy at the time, with criticism coming from left and right sides of the political spectrum. Despite this, the performance brought Firth a Royal TV Society Best Actor Award, and a nomination for the 1989 BAFTA Television Award. In 1989, he played the title role in Miloš Forman's Valmont, based on Les Liaisons dangereuses. Released just a year after Dangerous Liaisons, it did not make a big impact in comparison. That year he also played a paranoid, socially awkward character in the Argentinian psychological thriller Apartment Zero.

Firth finally became a British household name through his role as the aloof, haughty aristocrat Mr. Darcy in the 1995 BBC television adaptation of Jane Austen's Pride and Prejudice. Producer Sue Birtwistle's first choice for the part, he was eventually persuaded to take it despite his unfamiliarity with Austen's writing. He and co-star Jennifer Ehle began a romantic relationship during the filming, which received media attention only after their separation. Sheila Johnston wrote that Firth's approach to the part "lent Darcy complex shades of coldness, even caddishness, in the early episodes". The series was an international success and unexpectedly elevated Firth to stardom—in some part due to a scene not from the novel, where he emerges from a lake swim in a wet shirt. Although he did not mind being recognised as "a romantic idol as a Darcy with smouldering sex appeal" in a role that "officially turned him into a heart-throb", he expressed the wish not to be associated with Pride and Prejudice forever. He was, therefore, reluctant to accept similar roles and risk becoming typecast.

=== 1996–2008: Romance and ensemble films ===
For a time, it did seem as if Mr. Darcy would overshadow the rest of Firth's career, and there were humorous allusions to the role in his next five movies. The most notable was his casting as the love interest Mark Darcy in the film adaptation of Bridget Jones's Diary, itself a modern-day retelling of Pride and Prejudice. Firth accepted the part as he saw it as an opportunity to lampoon his Mr. Darcy character. The film was very successful and critically well-liked. A 2004 sequel was mostly panned by critics but still financially successful.

Prior to this, Firth had a significant supporting role in The English Patient (1996) as the husband of Kristin Scott Thomas's character, whose jealousy of her adultery leads to tragedy. That year he also played the husband of the character of Kristin's sister, Serena Scott Thomas, in the television miniseries Nostromo. Of the two he said "Serena was a much more faithful wife." He next played the lead role as a school teacher and obsessed Arsenal F.C. football fan in the romantic fictional adaptation Fever Pitch (1997) of Nick Hornby's million-selling autobiographical essay Fever Pitch: A Fan's Life. He had parts in light romantic period pieces such as Shakespeare in Love (1998), Relative Values (2000) and The Importance of Being Earnest (2002). He appeared in several television productions, including Donovan Quick (an updated version of Don Quixote) (1999), and had a more serious role as Dr. Wilhelm Stuckart in Conspiracy (2001), concerning the Nazi Wannsee Conference, for which he was nominated for a Primetime Emmy Award.

Firth featured in the ensemble all-star cast of Richard Curtis's Love Actually (2003), another financial success which divided critics. He was also given solo billing as the romantic lead in Hope Springs, but it received very poor reviews and made little box-office impact. He starred as Amanda Bynes' character's father in the 2003 teen comedy What A Girl Wants, which was based on the play The Reluctant Debutante. He played painter Johannes Vermeer opposite Scarlett Johansson in the 2003 release Girl with a Pearl Earring; some critics praised the film's subtlety and sumptuous visuals, whilst others found it almost restrained, tedious and bereft of emotion. Nevertheless, it received mostly favourable reviews, was moderately successful and earned several awards and nominations.

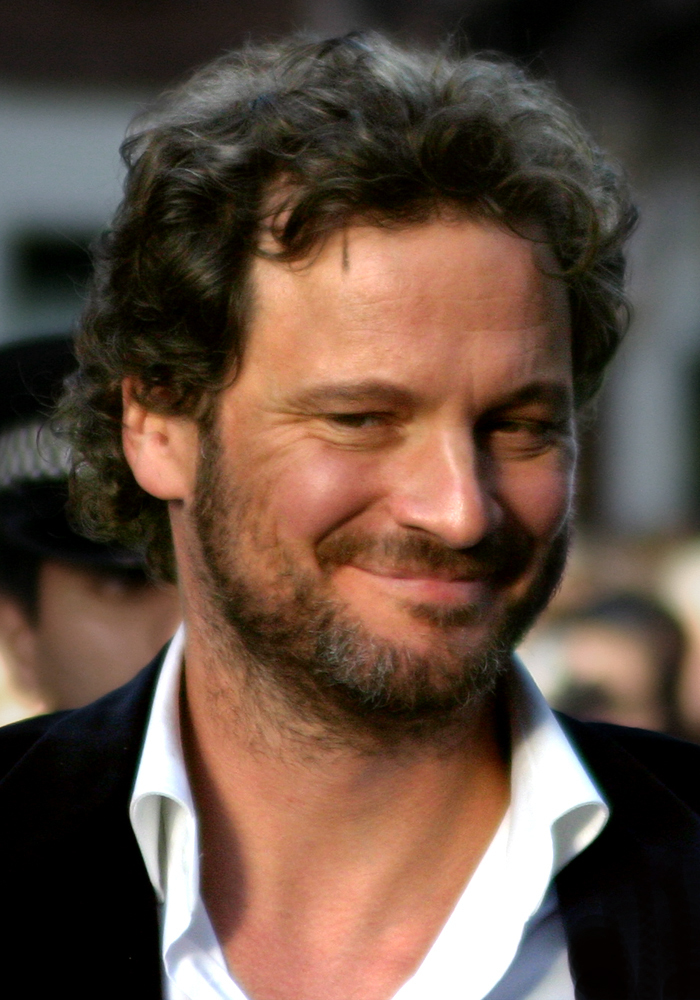
Firth at the premiere of Nanny McPhee in 2005

In 2005 Firth appeared in Nanny McPhee with Emma Thompson, in which he plays a struggling widowed father, it was a rare venture for him into the fantasy genre. He also appeared in Where the Truth Lies, a return to some of his darker, more intense early roles, that included a notorious scene featuring a bisexual orgy. Sheila Johnston wrote that it "confounded his fans", but nonetheless that his character "draws knowingly on that suave, cultivated persona", which could be traced from Mr. Darcy. Other films from this time included Then She Found Me (2007) with Helen Hunt and The Last Legion (2007) with Aishwarya Rai.

In 2008, he played the adult Blake Morrison reminiscing on his difficult relationship with his ailing father in the film adaptation of Morrison's memoir, And When Did You Last See Your Father? It received generally favourable reviews. Peter Bradshaw of The Guardian gave it four out of five stars. Manohla Dargis in The New York Times said: "It's a pleasure to watch Mr. Firth–a supremely controlled actor who makes each developing fissure visible–show the adult Blake coming to terms with his contradictory feelings, letting the love and the hurt pour out of him." Philip French of The Observer wrote that Firth "[does] quiet agonising to perfection." However, Derek Elley of Variety called the film "an unashamed tearjerker that's all wrapping and no center." While he conceded that it was "undeniably effective at a gut level despite its dramatic shortcomings", he added, "Things aren't helped any by Firth's dour perf, as his Blake comes across as a self-centered whiner, a latter-day Me Generation figure who's obsessed with finding problems when there really aren't any."

The film adaptation of Mamma Mia! (2008) was Firth's first foray into musicals. He described the experience as "a bit nerve-wracking" but believed he got off lightly by being tasked with one of the less demanding songs, Our Last Summer. Mamma Mia became the highest grossing British-made film of all time, taking in over $600 million worldwide. Like Love Actually, it polarised critics, with supporters such as Empire calling it "cute, clean, camp fun, full of sunshine, and toe tappers", whereas Peter Bradshaw in The Guardian said the film gave him a "need to vomit". Carrie Rickey in The Philadelphia Inquirer described Firth's performance as "the embodiment of forced mirth." That year, Firth also starred in Easy Virtue, which screened at the Rome Film Festival to excellent reviews. He starred in Genova, which premiered at the 2008 Toronto International Film Festival. In 2009 he appeared in A Christmas Carol, an adaptation of Charles Dickens' novel, using the performance capture procedure, playing Scrooge's optimistic nephew Fred, with Jim Carrey, Gary Oldman, Robin Wright Penn, Bob Hoskins and Cary Elwes.

=== 2009–2019: Critical success and leading roles ===
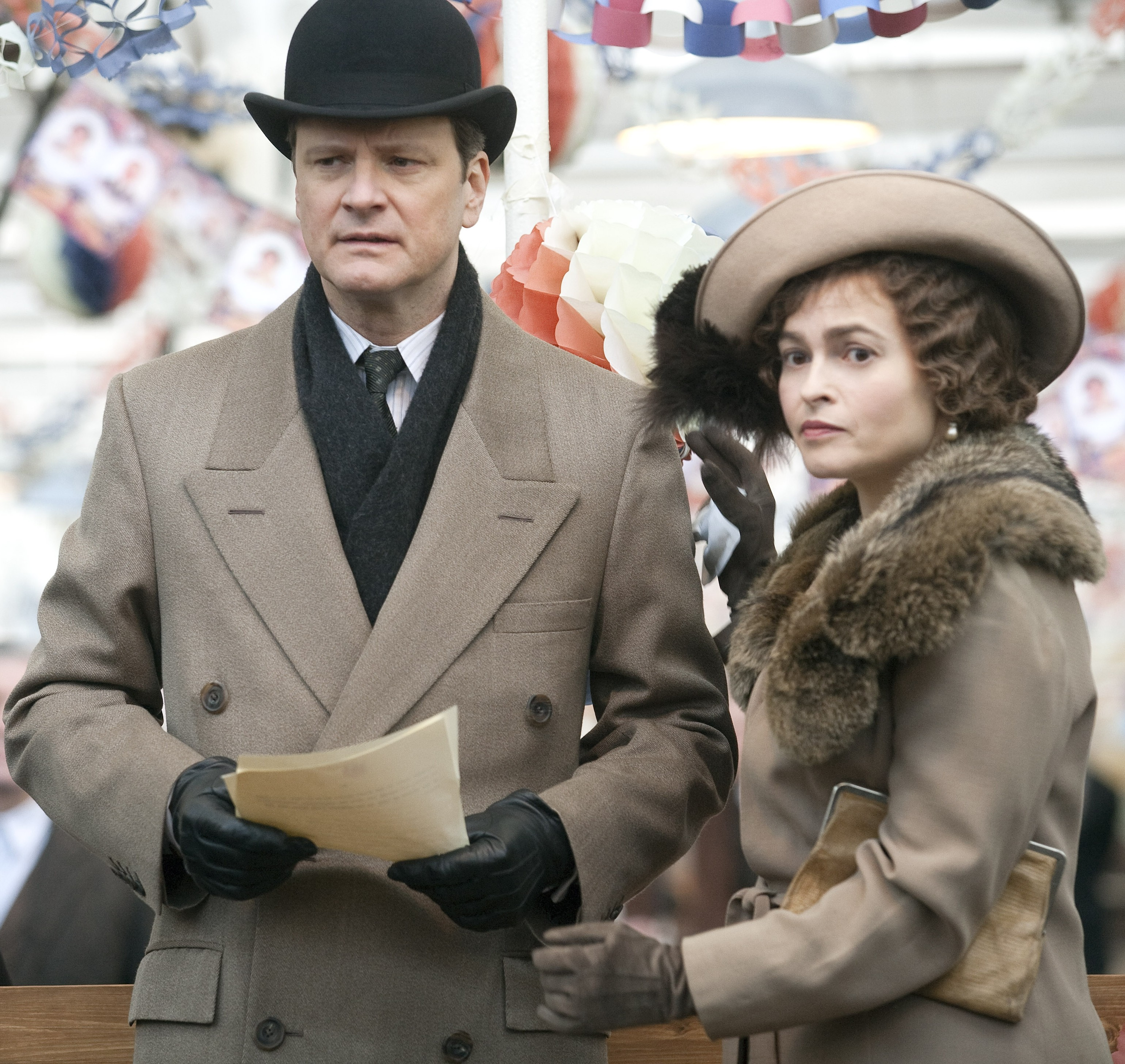
Firth with Helena Bonham Carter on the set of The King's Speech in 2009, his most critically acclaimed role to date

At the 66th Venice International Film Festival in 2009, Firth received the Volpi Cup for Best Actor for his role in Tom Ford's directorial debut A Single Man, as a college professor grappling with solitude after the death of his longtime partner. His performance earned him career-best reviews as well as the BAFTA Award for Best Actor in a Leading Role in February 2010. The role also earned him nominations for the Academy Award, Golden Globe Award, Screen Actors Guild Award. The Associated Press praised Firth's performance and opined that his performance "should help the film go beyond gay audiences to attract the more mainstream attention of Brokeback Mountain (2005) and Far From Heaven (2002).

Firth starred in the Tom Hooper directed historical drama film The King's Speech (2010) as Prince Albert, Duke of York/King George VI, detailing his efforts to overcome his speech impediment while becoming monarch of the United Kingdom at the end of 1936. Firth co-starred alongside Geoffrey Rush as his therapist Lionel Logue and Helena Bonham Carter as his wife Queen Elizabeth. At the Toronto International Film Festival (TIFF), the film received a standing ovation. The TIFF release of the film fell on Firth's 50th birthday and was called the "best 50th birthday gift". Firth won numerous accolades for his performance including the Academy Award for Best Actor as well as the BAFTA Award, the Golden Globe Award, and the Screen Actors Guild Award for Outstanding Lead Actor. The film was a financial success earning over $414 million worldwide.

Firth appeared as senior British secret agent Bill Haydon in the 2011 adaptation of the John le Carré novel Tinker Tailor Soldier Spy, directed by Tomas Alfredson and co-starring Gary Oldman, Benedict Cumberbatch, Tom Hardy, Mark Strong and John Hurt. It gathered mostly excellent reviews. The Independent described Firth's performance as "suavely arrogant" and praised the film. Deborah Young in The Hollywood Reporter thought Firth got "all the best dialogue", which he delivered "sardonically". Leslie Felperin in Variety wrote that all the actors brought their "A game" and Firth was in "particularly choleric, amusing form."

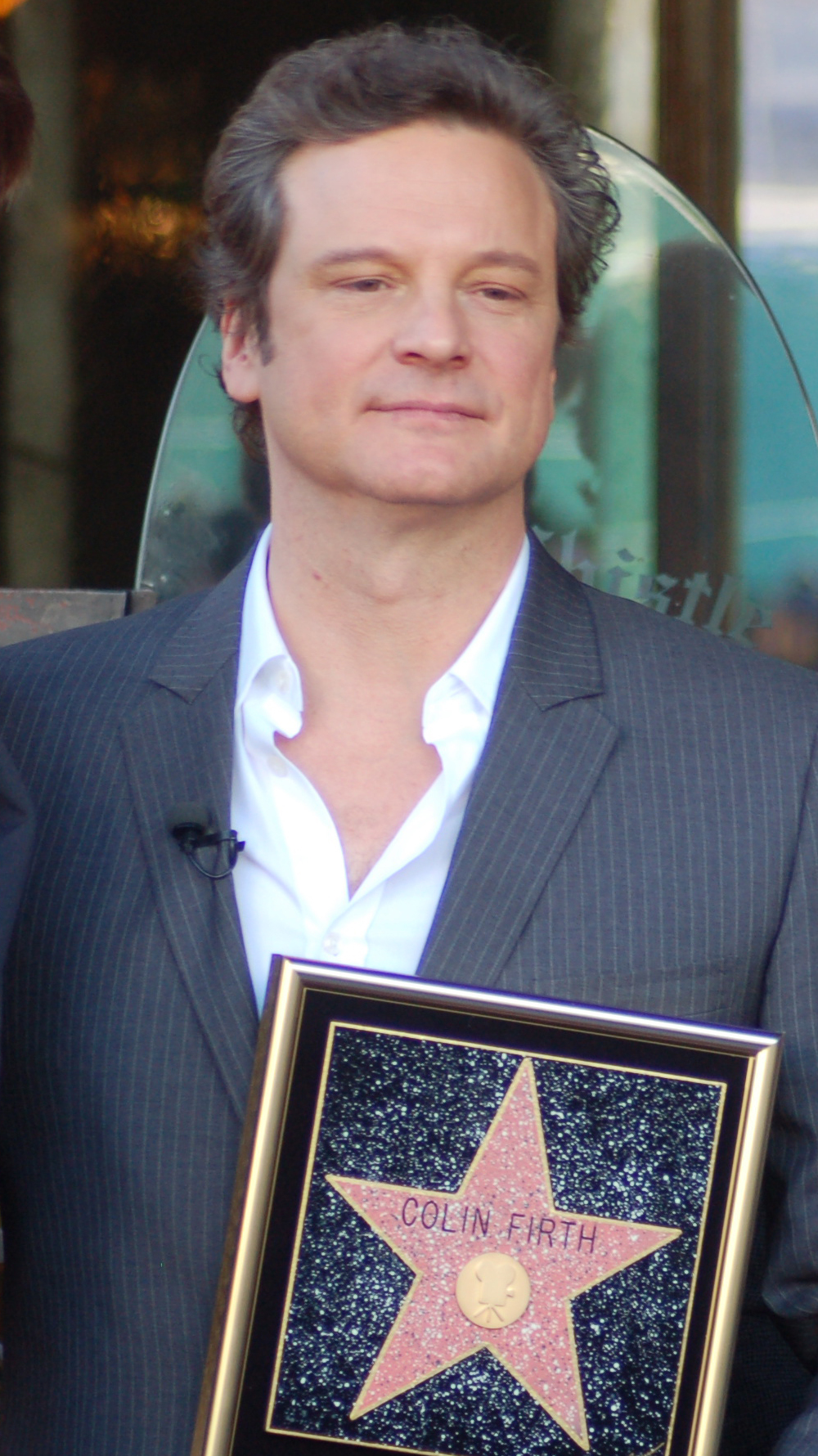
Firth receiving a star on the Hollywood Walk of Fame in 2011

In May 2011, Firth began filming Gambit — a remake of Ronald Neame's 1960s crime caper, in the part originally played by Michael Caine. It was released in the UK in November 2012 and was a financial and critical failure. Empire's Kim Newman wrote, "Firth starts out homaging Caine with his horn-rimmed cool but soon defaults to his usual repressed British cold mode", whilst Time Out London called his a "likeable performance", although criticised the film overall. Stephen Dalton in The Hollywood Reporter said, "To his credit, Firth keeps his performance grounded in downbeat realism while all around are wildly mugging in desperate pursuit of thin, forced laughs. In 2012, Firth co-founded Raindog Films with British music industry executive and entrepreneur Ged Doherty. Its first feature, Eye in the Sky, for which Firth was co-producer, was released in April 2016.

In May 2013, it was announced that Firth had signed to co-star with Emma Stone in Woody Allen's romantic comedy Magic in the Moonlight, set in the 1920s and shot on the French Riviera. In 2014, he did his first turn as Harry Hart / Agent Galahad in the spy action film Kingsman: The Secret Service, which grossed $414.4 million against an $81 million budget. Firth had been announced to voice Paddington Bear for the film Paddington; however, he announced his withdrawal on 17 June 2014, saying: "It's been bittersweet to see this delightful creature take shape and come to the sad realization that he simply doesn't have my voice".

In June 2015, he began filming the story of amateur yachtsman Donald Crowhurst in The Mercy, alongside Rachel Weisz, David Thewlis and Jonathan Bailey. In 2016, Firth reprised his popular role as Mark Darcy in Bridget Jones's Baby, which fared much better with audiences and critics than the second in the series (Bridget Jones: Edge of Reason). He portrayed American book editor Max Perkins in Genius, co-starring Jude Law as author Thomas Wolfe and based on A. Scott Berg's biography Max Perkins: Editor of Genius. In 2016 he began filming for Rupert Everett's directorial debut The Happy Prince, a biopic of Oscar Wilde, playing Wilde's friend Reginald "Reggie" Turner.

In 2017, he reprised his role as Jamie from 2003's Love Actually in the television short film Red Nose Day Actually, by original writer and director Richard Curtis. Also that year, Firth returned as Harry Hart / Agent Galahad in the sequel Kingsman: The Golden Circle. In 2018, Firth reprised his role of Harry Bright in the sequel to Mamma Mia!, Mamma Mia! Here We Go Again. That year, he also appeared as William Weatherall Wilkins in the musical fantasy film Mary Poppins Returns, starring Emily Blunt in the title role. He also played British naval commander David Russell in Thomas Vinterberg's Kursk, a film about the true story of the 2000 Kursk submarine disaster, in which he starred alongside Matthias Schoenaerts. In 2019, he had a cameo as British General Erinmore in Sam Mendes's World War I film 1917.

=== 2020–present ===
Set in 1947 England, Firth starred with Julie Walters in The Secret Garden and later in 2020 with Stanley Tucci in Supernova. In 2021, he starred in romantic drama film Mothering Sunday directed by Eva Husson. In December 2021, he was cast in Sam Mendes's drama film Empire of Light, starring Olivia Colman. He was seen as Ewen Montagu in Operation Mincemeat, in April 2022. Firth returned to television in May 2022 starring as Michael Peterson in the HBO production The Staircase. In 2025, Firth starred in the drama series Lockerbie: A Search for Truth, portraying Jim Swire whose daughter died on Pan Am Flight 103 while in flight over the Scottish town of Lockerbie in December 1988. In 2026, he acted in the Steven Spielberg directed science-fiction drama Disclosure Day alongside Emily Blunt and Josh O'Connor. David Rooney of The Hollywood Reporter wrote that Firth was "effectively playing against type as the villain of the piece" adding that he was "chilling, pushing his stern, fiercely intelligent demeanor in increasingly sinister directions and bringing nuance and gravity" to the role.

== Writing ==
Firth's first published work, "The Department of Nothing", appeared in Speaking with the Angel (2000), a collection of short stories edited by Nick Hornby and published to benefit the TreeHouse Trust to aid autistic children. He met Hornby during the filming of the original Fever Pitch. He contributed to the book We Are One: A Celebration of Tribal Peoples (2009), which explores the cultures, diversity and challenges of Indigenous peoples around the world. It features contributions from many Western writers, including Laurens van der Post, Noam Chomsky, Claude Lévi-Strauss; and from Indigenous people such as Davi Kopenawa Yanomami and Roy Sesana. Profits from the book's sale benefit the Indigenous rights organisation Survival International. Firth was an executive producer for the film In Prison My Whole Life, featuring Noam Chomsky and Angela Davis. It was selected to the 2007 London Film Festival and the 2008 Sundance Film Festival.

In December 2010, Firth was guest editor on BBC Radio 4's Today programme, where he commissioned research to scan the brains of volunteers (mostly university students) to see if there were structural differences that might account for political leanings. The resulting academic paper listed him as an author, along with two University College London researchers and the science reporter of the BBC Radio 4 Today programme. For his contribution, professor John Jost called Firth a 'scientific ambassador' in the field of political neuroscience. The study suggested that conservatives had more development in the amygdala, and liberals in the anterior cingulate cortex.

In 2012, Firth's audiobook recording of Graham Greene's The End of the Affair was released at Audible.com and was declared Audiobook of the Year at the 2013 Audie Awards.

== Activism ==
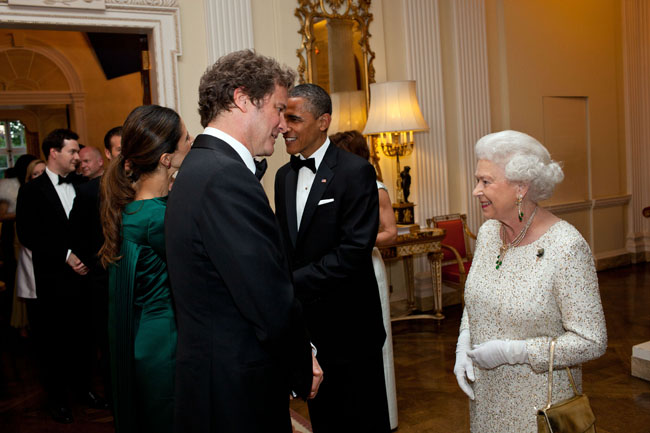
Firth with Queen Elizabeth II (and Barack Obama) at Winfield House in London in 2011

Firth has champaigned numerous causes including fighting for the rights of Indigenous peoples and is a member of Survival International. He has also campaigned on issues of asylum seekers, refugees' rights and the environment. He commissioned and co-authored a scientific paper on a study of the differences in brain structure between people of differing political orientations.

Firth has been a longstanding supporter of Survival International, a non-governmental organisation that advocates for the rights of tribal peoples. Speaking in 2001, he said, "My interest in tribal peoples goes back many years ... and I have supported [Survival] ever since." In 2003, during the promotion of Love Actually, he spoke in defence of the Indigenous people of Botswana, condemning the Botswana government's eviction of the Gana and Gwi people (San) from the Central Kalahari Game Reserve. He said of San, "These people are not the remnants of a past era who need to be brought up to date. Those who are able to continue to live on the land that is rightfully theirs are facing the 21st century with a confidence that many of us in the so-called developed world can only envy." He has also backed a Survival International campaign to press the Brazilian government to take more decisive action in defence of Awá-Guajá people, whose land and livelihood is critically threatened by the actions of loggers.

As a supporter of the Refugee Council, Firth was involved in a campaign to stop the deportation of a group of 42 Congolese asylum seekers, expressing concerns in open letters to The Independent and The Guardian that they faced being murdered on their return to the Democratic Republic of Congo. Firth said: "To me, it's just basic civilisation to help people. I find this incredibly painful to see how we dismiss the most desperate people in our society. It's easily done. It plays to the tabloids, to the Middle-England xenophobes. It just makes me furious. And all from a government we once had such high hopes for." Four of the asylum seekers were given last-minute reprieves from deportation.

Firth, along with other celebrities, has been involved in the Oxfam global campaign Make Trade Fair, focusing on trade practices considered especially unfair to third-world producers, including dumping, high import tariffs, and labour rights. He and some collaborators opened Eco, an eco-friendly shop in West London, which offers fair-trade and eco-friendly goods, and expert advice on making spaces more energy efficient. In October 2009, at the London Film Festival, he launched a film and political activism website, Brightwide (since decommissioned), with his wife Livia.

During the 2010 general election, Firth announced his support for the Liberal Democrats, having previously been a Labour supporter, citing asylum and refugees' rights as key reasons for the change. In December 2010, he publicly dropped his support of the Liberal Democrats, citing their U-turn on tuition fees, and said that he was currently unaffiliated. He appeared in literature supporting changing the British electoral system from first-past-the-post to alternative vote for electing members of parliament to the House of Commons, in the unsuccessful Alternative Vote referendum in 2011.

In 2009, Firth joined the 10:10 project, supporting the movement calling for people to reduce their carbon footprints. In 2010, he endorsed "Roots & Shoots", an education programme in the UK run by the Jane Goodall Institute.

== Personal life ==
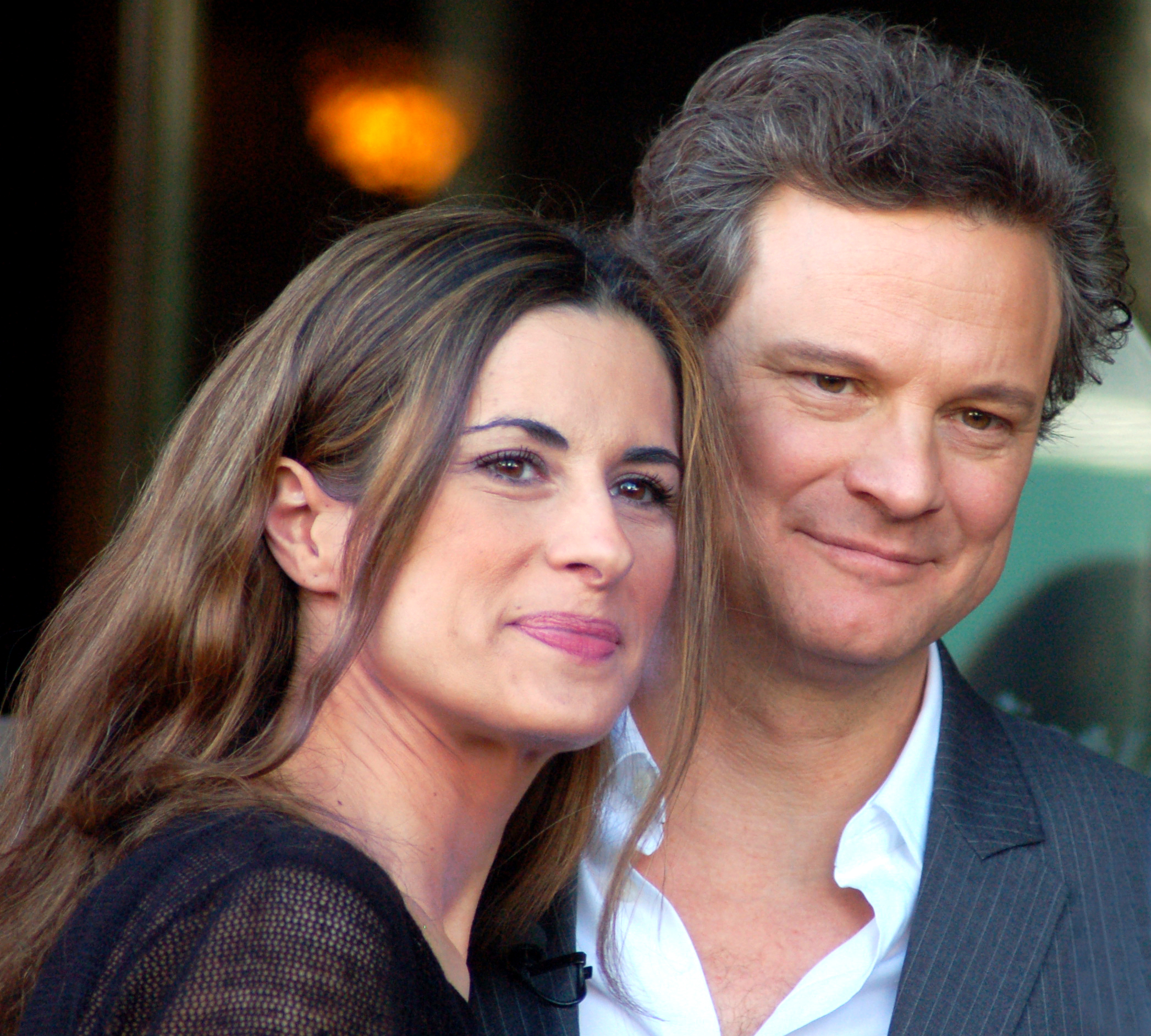
Firth with Livia Giuggioli in 2011

In 1989, Firth began a relationship with Meg Tilly, his co-star in Valmont. Their son, William Joseph Firth, was born in 1990. William is now also an actor, appearing with his father in Bridget Jones's Baby in 2016. The family moved to the Lower Mainland of British Columbia, Canada but Firth and Tilly ultimately broke up in 1994. During the filming of Pride and Prejudice, Firth and co-star Jennifer Ehle began a romantic relationship, which received media attention only after their separation.

In 1997, Firth married Italian activist Livia Giuggioli. They have two sons, Luca and Matteo. Firth speaks fluent Italian. The family divided their time between Wandsworth, in London, and Umbria, Italy. They announced their separation in 2019. They had gone through a private separation several years before, but had reconciled.

Firth was a vocal opponent of the Brexit initiative for the United Kingdom to leave the European Union. Following the referendum's passage, and the ensuing uncertainty over rights of non-EU citizens, he applied for "dual citizenship (British and Italian)" in 2017 to "have the same passports as his wife and children". The Italian Ministry of the Interior announced Firth's application had been approved on 22 September 2017. Firth stated regarding the decision that "I have a passionate love of Italy" but "will always be extremely British (you only have to look at or listen to me)."

In 2011, after winning the Academy Award for his portrayal of King George VI in The King's Speech, Firth suggested that he may be a republican (anti-monarchist) in a CNN interview with Piers Morgan, saying that voting was "one of his favourite things" and that unelected institutions were "a problem for him".

Following the end of his marriage, Firth had a relationship with the screenwriter Maggie Cohn, who he met on the set of the drama series The Staircase. As of October 2025, he was in a relationship with Eleonora Perboni.

== Acting credits and accolades ==
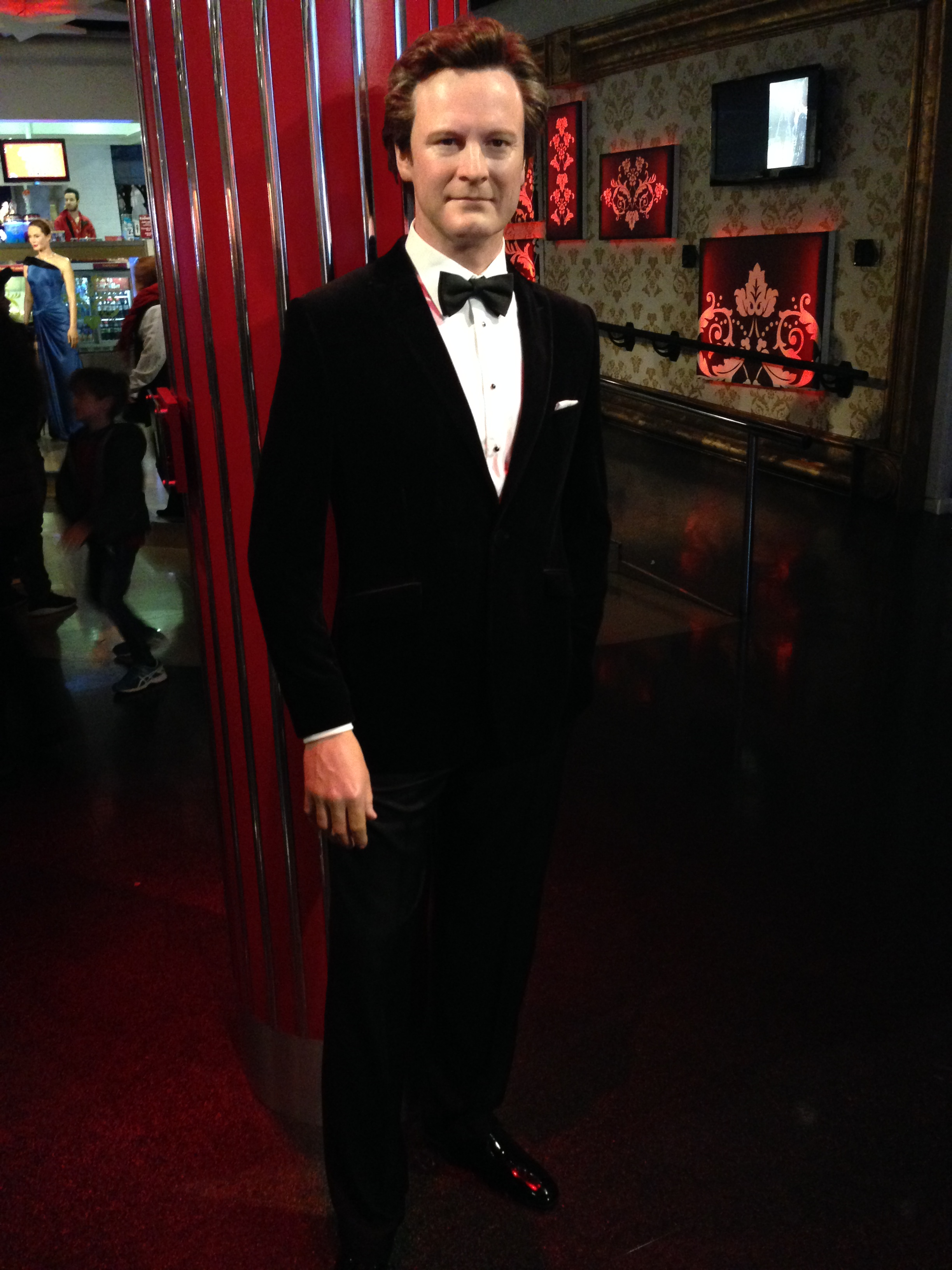
Wax statue of Firth at Madame Tussauds, London

Firth has received numerous awards, including an Academy Award, an Actor Award, a BAFTA Award, a Critics' Choice Award, and a Golden Globe Award, all for Best Actor, for his performance as King George VI in Tom Hooper's historical drama The King's Speech (2010).

He received an honorary doctorate on 19 October 2007 from the University of Winchester. On 13 January 2011, he was presented with the 2,429th star on the Hollywood Walk of Fame. In April 2011, Time included him in its list of the World's 100 Most Influential People. He was made a Freeman of the City of London on 8 March 2012, and was awarded an honorary fellowship by the University of the Arts London in 2012.

Firth was appointed Commander of the Order of the British Empire (CBE) in the 2011 Birthday Honours for services to drama.

== See also ==
- List of British actors
- List of Academy Award winners and nominees from Great Britain
- List of actors with Academy Award nominations
- List of actors with more than one Academy Award nomination in the acting categories
