= Matt Hookings =

Welsh actor (born 1990)

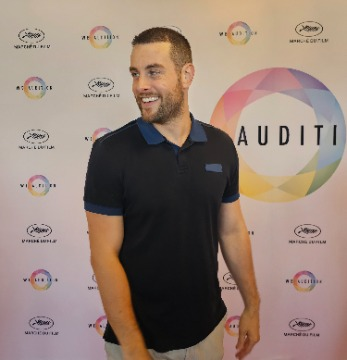
- Born: Matthew Pearce; 30 July 1990 (age 36); Newport, South Wales
- Citizenship: United Kingdom
- Education: University of Winchester
- Occupation: Actor/Writer
- Awards: Best Actor at the Hollywood International Film Festival
- Website: camelot-films.co.uk

Matt Hookings (born 30 July 1990) is a Welsh actor, producer, writer, and entrepreneur. He founded Camelot Films in 2013 in London, United Kingdom.

== Early life and education ==
Hookings was born on 30 July 1990 in Newport, South Wales, to a professional boxer, British Heavyweight Champion, David Pearce and Mary Hookings. He lost his father at the age of 11 and his mother remarried. Hookings studied Film and Drama at the University of Winchester. After completing graduation he moved to London to pursue a career in acting.

== Career ==
Hookings started his career as a stunt performer and worked on films with Angelina Jolie and Tom Cruise. He performed stunts in many Hollywood productions including, Maleficent, Edge of Tomorrow, Snow White and the Huntsman, Guardians of the Galaxy (film), and Avengers: Age of Ultron.

Some of Hookings’ work in the industry include playing a young Michael Caine. In the film The Grand Duke of Corsica, Hookings plays mystic Catholic friar St. Francis of Assisi alongside Timothy Spall and Peter Stormare. In the film, Winter Ridge he played the role of detective Ryan Barnes for which he received the Best Actor Award at the Hollywood International Film Festival held in Miami.

Hookings most notable work is the role of Jem Belcher in the film Prizefighter: The Life of Jem Belcher, which is a true story based on the life incidents of a boxing hero from the early 1800’s.

However, the film was a critical and commercial failure. It is Hookings' lowest rated film and only grossed $150,499 worldwide, despite an estimated $17M budget.

== Awards ==
- Best Actor Award at the Hollywood International Film Festival.

== Filmography ==
Year	Title	Role	Notes
2024	Classified	Antonio Griffin	
2022	Prizefighter: The Life of Jem Belcher	Jem Belcher	writer and producer
2021	The Grand Duke of Corsica	St. Francis of Assisi / Leos	producer and stunt coordinator
2021	The Seed		Producer
2018	Winter Ridge	Ryan Barnes	Actor and Producer
	The Birth of Boxing		Actor, Writer and Producer
	Alice Through the Looking Glass	The Hour	Actor
2014	Kingsman: The Secret Service	Young Arthur	Actor & Stunts
2014	The Inbetweeners 2	Toilet Attendant	Actor
2014	Edge of Tomorrow	Dog Soldier	Stunt Performer
2014	Maleficent	Stefan's Soldier	Stunt Performer
2013	Empty Promises	Tramp	Actor
2013	God's Gift		Actor and Producer
2013	The Marauders	White Fang	Actor and Producer
2012	Les Misérables	French Grenadier	Stunt Performer
2012	Snow White and the Huntsman	Magnus Guard	Stunt Performer
