= David Russell (Royal Navy officer) =

British Royal Navy officer

Commodore David Russell
- Born: Leeds
- Military career
- Allegiance: United Kingdom
- Branch: Royal Navy
- Service years: 1972
- Rank: Commodore
- Commands: HMS Vanguard
- Other work: Chief executive of The Harpur Trust

Commodore David John Russell is a former Royal Navy officer.

== Naval career ==
Russell attended Leeds Central High School and joined the Royal Navy on 1 September 1972. He was the first commanding officer of the United Kingdom's first Trident missile submarine, HMS Vanguard, after it was launched in 1992. He attended the Royal College of Defence Studies in 1995 and undertook the Higher Command and Staff Course in 1998.

He led the UK effort to rescue survivors from the sunken Russian submarine Kursk in the Barents Sea in 2000. After completing the Financial Seminar for Senior Managers at London Business School in May 2002, he joined the Harpur Trust as Chief Executive in 2002. He gained a first class honours degree in law with the Open University in 2003.

He lives with his wife, Kathy.
