= Cami Winikoff =

American film and television producer

- Occupation: Producer
- Years active: 1984–present
- Employer: Sobini Films
- Spouse: Scott Greco
- Children: Monika Wesley; Steven Greco

Cami Sarah Winikoff is an American film and television producer and the current president and co-founder of Sobini Films. She was invited to join the Academy of Motion Picture Arts and Sciences in 2019.

== Career ==
=== Independent ===
Winikoff began an independent producer. Her first feature Scarecrows was released in 1988.

=== Trimark Pictures ===
Winikoff joined Trimark Pictures in August 1990. She was appointed director of production in 1991, promoted to vice president of production in 1995, and again to senior vice president in January 1997. Winikoff began to serve as executive vice president and chief administrative officer of Trimark in September 1997, where she oversaw all business, legal affairs, production, post-production, servicing and administration for the company. She also sat on the board of directors of CinemaNow.com, dedicated to the streaming and production of niche-oriented independent films.

Winikoff was promoted to chief operating officer at Trimark in 2000 and oversaw all operational facets of the company including its production arm and green-light process. This included the administration of theatrical, television, and home entertainment productions. She helped build the company and was a key player in negotiations with its merger with Lionsgate in late 2000.

At Trimark, she headed the production of over 75 films. Her production credits include Eve's Bayou, winner of Independent Spirit Awards), directed by Kasi Lemmons, starring Samuel L. Jackson; Frida, winner of two Academy Awards, starring Salma Hayek; Love and a .45 starring Renée Zellweger and Gil Bellows; Kicking and Screaming by Noah Baumbach; Kama Sutra: A Tale of Love by Mira Nair; and the Leprechaun film series.

=== Lionsgate ===
After the merger with Lionsgate, Winikoff served as its executive vice president, where she helped build the company's executive team and business plan.

=== Sobini Films ===
Winikoff was tapped as the president of Sobini Films in 2002. In her time at Sobini, she has developed a diverse range of feature films and franchises. Her credits include JT Leroy starring Kristen Stewart and Laura Dern; I'd Kill for You with her daughter Monika Wesley; Mary Shelley starring Elle Fanning; Miles Ahead starring Don Cheadle; Good Kill starring Ethan Hawke; Stonehearst Asylum starring Kate Beckinsale; An American Girl: Chrissa Stands Strong for HBO, recipient of the National Parenting Publications Gold Award; and Streets of Legend. She also produced the documentary Jujitsu-ing Reality, shortlisted for the 2013 Best Documentary Short Subject Academy Award.

She produced The Prince & Me starring Julia Stiles for Paramount Studios and its sequels. As the producer of Peaceful Warrior starring Nick Nolte, she was inspired by the film, and not satisfied by its minimal exposure, worked with Adam Fogelson of Universal Pictures to test a new marketing plan, giving away tickets at Best Buy to gain a wider audience.

She is currently developing Z, a reboot of the Zorro franchise.

== Activism ==
Winikoff has been active in promoting dark skies in Malibu, California, as president of the Malibu Community Alliance (MCA). She negotiated with local agencies for five years to develop a new dark skies ordinance, which took effect October 15, 2018. Previously, she and the MCA settled with the Santa Monica–Malibu Unified School District over an appeal to the California Coastal Commission regarding Malibu High School's upgraded lighting in 2016. The Coastal Commission approved the settlement.

Winikoff has also served on the board of Malibu Unites, a local advocacy group that pressured the school district's handling of toxins.

== Filmography ==
Year	Title	Role
1988	Scarecrows	Producer
1993	Leprechaun	Production Supervisor
1993	Philadelphia Experiment II	Production Supervisor
1993	Return of the Living Dead 3	Production Supervisor
1993	Warlock: The Armageddon	Production Supervisor
1994	A Million to Juan	Executive in Charge of Production
1994	Dangerous Touch	Production Supervisor
1994	Frank and Jesse	Production Supervisor
1994	Hong Kong '97	Production Supervisor
1994	Leprechaun 2	Production Supervisor
1994	Love and a .45	Production Supervisor
1994	The Stoned Age	Production Director
1995	A Kid in King Arthur's Court	Production Supervisor
1995	Evolver	Production Supervisor
1995	Heatseeker	Production Supervisor
1995	Kicking and Screaming	Production Supervisor
1995	Leprechaun 3	Production Supervisor
1995	The Maddening	Executive in Charge of Production
1995	Night of the Running Man	Production Executive
1995	Return to Two Moon Junction	Production Supervisor
1995	Separate Lives	Production Supervisor
1996	Crossworlds	Production Supervisor
1996	The Dentist	Executive in Charge of Production
1996	Never Ever	Executive in Charge of Production
1996	Pinocchio's Revenge	Production Supervisor
1996	Public Enemies	Production Executive
1996	Sometimes They Come Back... Again	Executive in Charge of Production
1996	Two Guys Talkin' About Girls	Production Supervisor
1997	Eve's Bayou	Co-Producer
1997	Sprung	Production Supervisor
1997	Star Kid	Co-Producer
1997	Trucks	Executive in Charge of Production
1998	Ground Control	Chief Administration Officer
1999	Held Up	Executive in Charge of Production
1999	The Simple Life of Noah Dearborn	Executive in Charge of Production
2001	Route 666	Executive Producer
2003	Streets of Legend	Co-Producer
2004	The Prince & Me	Executive Producer
2006	Peaceful Warrior	Producer, Actress
2008	The Prince & Me 3: A Royal Honeymoon	Executive Producer
2009	An American Girl: Chrissa Stands Strong	Producer
2010	Burning Bright	Producer
2011	Jujitsu-ing Reality	Producer
2013	Sexy Evil Genius	Executive Producer
2014	Good Kill	Executive Producer
2014	Stonehearst Asylum	Executive Producer
2015	Miles Ahead	Co-Executive Producer
2016	Field of Screams: Cami Winikoff on Scarecrows	Self
2017	Mary Shelley	Executive Producer
2018	I'd Kill for You	Producer
2018	JT LeRoy	Executive Producer
2020	Emperor	Producer
