= Chris Geere =

English actor (born 1981)

- Born: Christopher William Geere; 18 March 1981 (age 45); Cambridge, Cambridgeshire, England
- Occupation: Actor
- Years active: 2001–present
- Spouse: Jennifer Sawdon (m. 2010)
- Children: 1

Christopher William Geere (born 18 March 1981) is an English actor. He is known for playing the lead role of Jimmy Shive-Overly in the FX and FXX dark comedy series You're the Worst (2014), Roger Clifford in the 2019 film Detective Pikachu, and Kanduu / Slappy the Dummy in the Disney+/Hulu series Goosebumps (2023).

== Career ==
Geere graduated from Guildford School of Acting and began his career on stage opposite Dame Judi Dench in Royal Shakespeare Company's All's Well That Ends Well.

Geere played Music and Drama teacher Matt Wilding in the BBC One school based drama series Waterloo Road. In January 2009, just as the fourth series of Waterloo Road began airing, Geere said that he would not be returning for the fifth series after he left from the show at the end of the fourth series. He later returned to the show for the seventh series in 2011. In 2012, he left Waterloo Road once again, after his character Matt Wilding decided to stay in Rochdale, England instead of Scotland.

Geere was cast as King Edvard (replacing Luke Mably) in the romantic comedy films The Prince and Me 3: A Royal Honeymoon (2008) and The Prince and Me 4: The Elephant Adventure (2010), which are sequels to The Prince and Me.

Geere broke out to American audiences as Jimmy Shive-Overly, one half of the toxic and self-destructive couple at the heart of Stephen Falk's critically acclaimed comedy You're the Worst for FX and FXX, which received four Critic's Choice nominations including Best Comedy. You're the Worst ran for five seasons from 2014 to 2019.

In 2019, Geere joined the global Pokémon universe as Roger Clifford in the Legendary Entertainment/Warner Bros. live-action film Pokémon Detective Pikachu alongside Justice Smith, Ryan Reynolds, Kathryn Newton and Bill Nighy.

Geere recurred on ABC's Modern Family as Haley and then Alex's love interest Professor Arvin Fennerman; as Joel, the well-meaning but toxic lead in the BBC and Showtime's dark comedic limited series, Ill Behaviour, opposite Tom Riley and Lizzy Caplan; Channel 4's This Way Up starring Sharon Horgan and Aisling Bea; The First Team with Will Arnett; and on A Million Little Things as Allison Miller's new roommate/love interest Jamie.

After recurring in season 5, Geere joined the cast of This Is Us as a series regular for their sixth and final season.

== Personal life ==
Geere was born in Cambridge, Cambridgeshire. He married Jennifer Sawdon, a singer-songwriter and pianist, in 2010. Their son was born in 2012.

== Filmography ==
=== Film ===
| Year | Title | Role | Notes |
|---|---|---|---|
| 2003 | Wondrous Oblivion | Mrs. Wilson's grandson | |
| 2007 | Blood and Chocolate | Ulf | |
| 2008 | Lawnchairs & Grappling Hooks | Simon | Short |
| 2008 | The Prince & Me: A Royal Honeymoon | King Edvard / Eddie | Direct-to-video |
| 2010 | The Prince & Me: The Elephant Adventure | King Edvard / Eddie | Direct-to-video |
| 2011 | Endless | Abraham | Short |
| 2012 | Cleanskin | Nick | |
| 2013 | After Earth | Hesper Navigator | |
| 2014 | The Last Showing | Jamie | |
| 2016 | Urge | Vick | |
| 2018 | Deadtectives | Sam Whitner | |
| 2018 | The Festival | Brother David | |
| 2019 | Detective Pikachu | Roger Clifford / Ditto | |
| 2025 | Kinda Pregnant | Steve | |

=== Television ===
| Year | Title | Role | Notes |
|---|---|---|---|
| 2001 | Band of Brothers | German Soldier | Unknown episodes |
| 2002 | TLC | Medical Student | Season 1, episode 6: "Agency Nurse" |
| 2002 | Casualty | Longfellow | Season 18, episode 16: "Eat, Drink and Be Merry" |
| 2003 | Trust | Andy Boyd | 3 episodes – Season 1, episodes 1, 2 and 3 |
| 2003 | Adventure Inc. | Ben | 2 episodes – Season 1, episode 12: "Angel of St. Edmunds" and season 1, episode 13: "Echoes of the Past" |
| 2003 | Danielle Cable: Eyewitness | Josh Harman | TV film |
| 2003 | Reversals | Student | TV film |
| 2004 | The Bill | Michael Sparks | Season 20, episode 61 |
| 2005 | Family Affairs | Joel Dobson | 2 episodes – Season 9, episode 256 and season 9, episode 257 |
| 2006 | Bombshell | Gunner Dean McGowan | 7 episodes – Season 1, episodes 1–7 |
| 2007–2009, 2011–2012 | Waterloo Road | Matt Wilding | 60 episodes |
| 2008 | EastEnders | Anton | 2 episodes |
| 2010 | Hollyoaks | Dale Greer | 1 episode |
| 2010 | Missing | Lee Beckett | Season 2, episode 5 |
| 2010 | Pete Versus Life | Kurt | 5 episodes – Season 1, episodes 1–5 |
| 2010 | Holby City | Patrick Wright | Season 13, episode 4: "Queen's Gambit" |
| 2012 | Doctors | Tom Malone | Season 14, episode 6: "A Little on the Side" |
| 2012 | Little Crackers | Harry | Season 3, episode 1: "Joanna Lumley's Little Cracker: Baby, Be Blonde" |
| 2013 | The Spa | Bolek Glodwisky | 6 episodes – Season 1, episodes 2–7 |
| 2013 | Trollied | Richard France | Series 3 |
| 2014 | Death in Paradise | Max Leigh | Series 3, episode 4 |
| 2014 | Outnumbered | Tommy | Series 5, episode 6 |
| 2014–2019 | You're the Worst | Jimmy Shive-Overly | Series lead, 62 episodes |
| 2017 | Ill Behaviour | Joel | 3 episodes – Series 1 |
| 2018–2020 | Modern Family | Dr. Arvin Fennerman | 9 episodes – Seasons 9–11, recurring role |
| 2019 | This Way Up | Freddie | Recurring role |
| 2020 | Single Parents | Colin | 3 episodes |
| 2020 | The First Team | Chris Booth | 6 episodes |
| 2020 | A Million Little Things | Jamie | Recurring role – Season 3 |
| 2020–2022 | This Is Us | Phillip | Guest star (season 5); Main cast (season 6) |
| 2021 | Hacks | British TV Producer | Guest Star – Season 1 |
| 2022–2023 | Kung Fu Panda: The Dragon Knight | Klaus (voice) | 10 episodes |
| 2023 | Goosebumps | Kanduu / Slappy the Dummy | 4 episodes |
