= An American Girl: Chrissa Stands Strong =

- Based on: Chrissa by Mary Casanova
- Screenplay by: Christine Coyx
- Directed by: Martha Coolidge
- Starring: Sammi Hanratty; Austin Thomas; Kaitlyn Dever; Adair Tishler; Ariela Barer; Shelby Harmon
- Composer: Jennie Muskett
- Country of origin: United States
- Original language: English

Production
- Producers: Mark Amin; Ellen L. Brothers; David Higgins; Andrew Reimer; Cami Winikoff
- Cinematography: Johnny E. Jensen
- Editor: Elba Sanchez-Short
- Running time: 91 minutes
- Production companies: HBO Films; Sobini Films; The End Productions

Original release
- Network: HBO
- Release: January 5, 2009

Related
- Kit Kittredge: An American Girl; An American Girl: McKenna Shoots for the Stars

An American Girl: Chrissa Stands Strong is a 2009 American television film and the fifth film in the American Girl series. It was the first American Girl film to focus on a Girl of the Year, starring Sammi Hanratty in the title role. It is based on the Chrissa books in the American Girl series written by Mary Casanova.

The film was directed by Martha Coolidge, from a screenplay by Christine Coyle Johnson and Julie Prendiville Roux and released on HBO on January 5, 2009. It won a 2009 Gold Award from National Parenting Publications (NAPPA).

== Plot ==
Chrissa Maxwell and her family move from Iowa to Minnesota in order to be closer to Chrissa's grandmother, Louise "Nana" Hanlon, after the death of Chrissa's grandfather. At her new school, Chrissa has difficulty making friends and soon finds herself bullied by three girls named Tara James, Jayden Johnson, and Sonali Matthews, who are known as the Mean Bees.

Chrissa tries to befriend another girl, Gwen Thompson, who’s also being bullied by the Bees. Gwen avoids Chrissa at first, but Chrissa later finds out that Gwen avoided her because of her homelessness and is ashamed of it; Chrissa and Gwen then become best friends after the former promises not to tell anyone about the situation. Later, Gwen tells Chrissa in the music room that her mom got a job, and they are moving into an apartment. The Bees walk by the room and overhear the conversation. Gwen asks Chrissa to cut her bangs for her in the bathroom. The Bees enter and Tara offers to cut them for Gwen. She purposely does a terrible job, telling Gwen she really looks like a homeless person. Gwen tearfully and angrily accuses Chrissa of telling Tara about her homelessness. Chrissa and the Bees are sent to the principal's office where they are asked to tell the truth. Tara lies and says that Chrissa told her about Gwen’s situation; Jayden also lies and says that she did not see anything. However, Sonali tells the truth about what happened. The principal, Mrs. Ziminsky, suspends the Bees — Tara for three days, and Sonali and Jayden for only a day. After her suspension, Sonali apologizes to Gwen about all the mean things she has done to her, and leaves Tara and Jayden, then befriending Chrissa and Gwen.

After the incident, the bullying gets more intense. Posters and rumors about Chrissa on the Internet are spread around by Tara and Jayden. Chrissa quits her school swim team as a result of being picked on, especially after an incident involving her older brother, Tyler. Chrissa gets advice from Mrs. Rundell, her art teacher, to tell her parents about the bullying. After she tells her parents, they help Chrissa see that sometimes, bullies are mean because they want to feel better about themselves and try to do so by insulting others and putting them down.

With her newfound confidence, Chrissa and her friends show everyone that they are happy with who they are by doing fun things such as wearing homemade painted headbands. Their happiness and confidence annoy Tara and Jayden, but the three friends ignore them. Chrissa decides to do a project to make people aware about bullying and rejoins the swim team. The big swim competition approaches, and Chrissa realizes that she and Tara have to work together if they want to win the relay. Although Tara is reluctant, Chrissa assures her that though they may not be friends, they can still work together to win. Their teamwork earns them their victory, and they reconcile and hug.

The 4th grade class present their project about how bullying affects everyone and how friendship can overcome bullying. Chrissa's best friend from Iowa, Amanda, visits her for the summer and befriends Sonali and Gwen.

== Main characters ==
- Chrissa Maxwell - (Sammi Hanratty) - A 10-year-old girl who is bullied by Tara and Jayden. She does not want to tell anyone because she thinks if she says that she will be a tattletale, so she decides to keep the bullying a secret. She joins the school's swim team but soon quits after an accident at the pool involving her older brother, Tyler; however, she soon understands that the reason that she quit shows her less than who she actually is and to her foes. She then works with Tara to win by assuring her that even if they cannot be best friends, or any kind of friends for that matter, their work together will earn a victory, which proves to be true. Her best friends are Amanda, Gwen, and Sonali.
- Tyler Maxwell - (Austin Thomas) - Tyler is Chrissa's older brother. He also joins the school's swim team, but he has to quit after he gets injured. He plays a small part in Tara's plans.
- Gwen Thompson - (Kaitlyn Dever) - A homeless girl who lives in a shelter called Sunrise House. She is very lonely and shy until she meets Chrissa. Chrissa becomes friends with her after she hears Gwen playing her violin at school and offers her homemade chocolate chip cookies at lunch. Gwen lost her father 18 months before the story.
- Tara James - (Adair Tishler) - The leader of the Mean Bees and a bully at Chrissa's school. She and her friends sometimes cruel things to anyone who gets in her way. but she works with Chrissa at the last team meet and their work earns the victory of the meet and the two hug. Her friend Sonali quits and, like Jayden, Tara is resentful for it. She soon realizes that her bullying has consequences and eventually befriends Chrissa.
- Sonali Matthews - (Ariela Barer) - Sonali is the dark-haired friend of Tara and Jayden at the beginning of the film until she realizes that they were being extremely mean. She makes amends with Chrissa Maxwell and Gwen Thompson, eventually even becoming best friends with them. She is proven to be loyal, sweet, caring and sensitive. She loves to do arts and crafts much like Chrissa, and when she works on painting a bowl for Gwen's homeless shelter, Sonali and Chrissa become very close.
- Jayden Johnson - (Shelby Harmon) - A friend of Tara who plays a small part in her plans. She stays loyal to Tara, unlike Sonali. (The spelling of her name in the book is "Jadyn" but is changed in the film to "Jayden.") Jayden became angry after Sonali left her club and is the only one who blames Sonali for getting her and Tara suspended.

== Minor characters ==
- Meg Maxwell - (Annabeth Gish) - Chrissa's mother, who just got a job as a doctor at St. Lukes hospital in Edgewater. She tries to protect Chrissa from bullying and at the end, gives her the idea to stop bullying. She tells her that standing strong is the most important thing when one is bullied, whether it is for oneself, or a friend.
- Paul Maxwell - (Timothy Bottoms) - Chrissa's father who gives her the idea that her social 4th grade project should be about bullying. He also runs a pottery studio.
- Louise "Nana" Hanlon - (Michael Learned) - Chrissa's grandmother, mother of Mrs. Maxwell, a widow whose house the Maxwell family moved into. She is also always there for Chrissa and protects her from the bullying.
- Mrs. Ziminsky - (Joanne Baron) - Chrissa's school principal, who always tries to keep the students out of trouble.
- Mr. Beck - (Don Franklin) - Chrissa's teacher and swim coach. He also tries to keep the students out of trouble.
- Mrs. Rundell - (Jennifer Tilly) - Chrissa's art teacher.
- Ms. Janine Thompson - (Jennifer Parsons) - Gwen's mother, a widow, who lives with her at Sunrise House, later an apartment.
