= The Prince & Me =

2004 American romantic comedy film

- Theatrical release poster
- Directed by: Martha Coolidge
- Screenplay by: Jack Amiel; Michael Begler; Katherine Fugate
- Story by: Mark Amin
- Produced by: Mark Amin
- Starring: Julia Stiles; Luke Mably; Ben Miller; James Fox; Miranda Richardson
- Cinematography: Alex Nepomniaschy
- Edited by: Steven Cohen
- Music by: Jennie Muskett
- Production companies: Lions Gate Films; Sobini Films
- Distributed by: Paramount Pictures (United States, Canada and France); Lions Gate Films (International)
- Release date: April 2, 2004
- Running time: 106 minutes
- Country: United States
- Language: English
- Budget: $22 million
- Box office: $37.6 million

The Prince & Me is a 2004 American romantic comedy film directed by Martha Coolidge, and starring Julia Stiles, Luke Mably and Ben Miller, with Miranda Richardson, James Fox and Alberta Watson. The film focuses on Paige Morgan, a pre-med college student in Wisconsin, who is pursued by a Danish prince posing as an ordinary college student. The film had 3 direct-to-video sequels created under different writers and a new director, with Kam Heskin replacing Julia Stiles in the role of Paige Morgan: The Prince & Me 2: The Royal Wedding (2006), The Prince & Me: A Royal Honeymoon (2008), and The Prince & Me: The Elephant Adventure (2010).

== Plot ==
Paige Morgan is an ambitious pre-medical student at the University of Wisconsin–Madison. Meanwhile, across the Atlantic, Denmark's Crown Prince Edvard prefers to live the life of a playboy, and often ignores or marginalizes his royal responsibilities when with his family.

Inspired by a television commercial showing Wisconsin students flashing their breasts, Edvard meets with his parents, King Haraald and Queen Rosalind, and announces his intention to attend college in America—specifically, Wisconsin, and to do so anonymously. The Queen then dispatches Edvard's majordomo, Søren, to chaperone the trip. Arriving at the university, Edvard orders him to keep his identity a secret and to call him 'Eddie'.

Later at a bar, Eddie sees Paige serving and asks her to take off her shirt, like on television. She angrily drenches him with the drink hose and bouncers escort Eddie from the bar. Eddie later apologizes to Paige, but she is annoyed when they are assigned as lab partners for an organic chemistry class. Since the class is important for Paige's medical school ambitions, she warns Eddie to not get in her way and reprimands him after he sleeps in through one of their lab experiments.

Running out of money, Eddie gets a job in the deli section of the bar. Paige reluctantly helps him during his first day, and the two start to mend fences. Paige does well in science, but she struggles in an English literature class. Eddie uses his earlier education to help her gain a better understanding of William Shakespeare, and Paige instructs him in common household chores like laundry.

Since Eddie is away from his family and unfamiliar with American holidays, Paige invites him to her parents’ dairy farm for Thanksgiving. Paige's father explains how he struggles to keep the small farm afloat, and Eddie uses his mechanical skills to fine-tune a riding mower for a race, which he wins. Keith Kopetsky, a rival racer reveals to be a sore loser and punches Eddie. After the fight that follows, Paige treats his grazes and they kiss for the first time.

Back at school, Eddie and Paige study for final exams. They sneak off to the library stacks to pursue a romantic encounter, where they kiss and take off his jacket and shirt. They are shortly ambushed by members of the Danish tabloid press. Once away from the mayhem, Paige learns his real identity and walks away from him through the rain. Just then, Eddie is notified by his mother that his father is very ill and she asks him to return home.

While Paige is questioned at a viva voce panel about Shakespeare, she realizes that she loves Edvard and runs to find him, but his roommate Scotty tells her that he has already left for Denmark. She follows him there and while being driven round Copenhagen is delayed by a royal parade. Paige leaves her taxi and is recognized from the papers by the crowd, who call Edvard's attention to her. He mounts her behind him on his horse, hurriedly opens a parliamentary session and takes her to the castle.

The queen objects to Edvard's choice, but the king tells him that if he loves Paige, he should marry her. Edvard proposes and she accepts. After witnessing him reconcile workers and employers in a parliamentary committee, the queen realizes that Paige has helped him grow up at last and will make a good queen. However, during Eddie's coronation ball, Paige remembers that she is betraying her ambition to become a doctor working in Third World countries, breaks off her engagement and returns home.

King Haraald abdicates and the newly crowned Edvard realizes that he too has responsibilities to shoulder. However, he arrives after Paige's graduation and tells her that she is his choice and he is willing to wait for however long it takes to achieve her dreams.

== Cast ==
- Julia Stiles as Paige Morgan
- Luke Mably as Edvard, Crown Prince of Denmark/Edvard III, King of Denmark ("Eddie Williams")
- Ben Miller as Søren
- Miranda Richardson as Rosalind, Queen consort of Denmark
- James Fox as Haraald, King of Denmark
- Alberta Watson as Amy Morgan
- John Bourgeois as Ben Morgan
- Stephen O'Reilly as Mike Morgan
- Zachary Knighton as John Morgan
- Elisabeth Waterston as Beth Curtis
- Eliza Bennett as Princess Arabella
- Devin Ratray as Scotty
- Clare Preuss as Stacey
- Yaani King as Amanda
- Eddie Irvine as himself
- Angelo Tsarouchas as Stu
- Jacques Tourangeau as Professor Amiel
- Joanne Baron as Margueritte - Royal Designer
- Stephen Singer as Professor Begler
- Sarah Manninen as Krista
- Tony Munch as Keith Kopetsky
- John Nelles as Race Announcer
- Claus Bue as Lutheran Archbishop

== Production ==
In December 2002, it was reported that Paramount Pictures and Lionsgate Films would co-produce The Prince and the Freshman, a romantic comedy set to be directed by Martha Coolidge and star Julia Stiles. The film was the first project from Sobini Films, founded by Mark Amin following his sale of Trimark Pictures to Lionsgate, and was developed from an idea by Amin with Katherine Fugate writing the initial script. Susan Sarandon was initially in talks to play Rosalind, Queen consort of Denmark.

== Soundtrack ==
The composer was Jennie Muskett. The film's soundtrack was released on March 30, 2004, in the United States by Hollywood Records.

=== Track listing ===
1. "Everybody Wants You" - Josh Kelley
2. "Just a Ride" - Jem
3. "Fire Escape" - Fastball
4. "Man of the World" - Marc Cohn
5. "Calling" - Leona Naess
6. "Good Intentions" - Jennifer Stills
7. "I Hope That I Don't Fall in Love with You" - Marc Cohn
8. "Symphony" - Jessica Riddle
9. "It Doesn’t Get Better Than This" - Katy Fitzgerald
10. "Freeway" - Scapegoat Wax
11. "Presidente" - Kinky
12. "Drift" - Forty Foot Echo
13. "Party" - The D4
14. "Bloodsweet" - Scapegoat Wax
15. "Separate Worlds" - Jennie Muskett

== Reception ==
Review aggregator Rotten Tomatoes reports an aggregate score of 29% based on 121 reviews, with an average rating of 4.8/10. The website's critics consensus reads, "A bland, fluffy, and predictable bit of wish fulfillment." On Metacritic, the film holds a weighted average score of 47 out of 100, based on 31 critics, indicating "mixed or average reviews". Audiences polled by CinemaScore gave the film an average grade of "B+" on an A+ to F scale.

The Christian Science Monitor's David Sterritt gave the film a positive review, calling it "quite appealing, thanks to good-humored acting and to Martha Coolidge's quiet directing style." Meanwhile, Manohla Dargis of the Los Angeles Times gave the film a negative review, calling it "a blandly diverting, chastely conceived and grammatically challenged fairy tale" USA Today said that The Prince & Me was overall "well-meaning, cute, sweet" but that the film could have been improved with "a bit more quirkiness and a little less formula."
