= James H. Carrington =

American actor and screenwriter (1949–2025)

James H. Carrington (1949 – April 30, 2025) was an American actor and screenwriter. Beginning his career on Broadway and in independent film, he later became a prolific screenwriter, contributing to the Academy Award-nominated film Children of a Lesser God and numerous acclaimed Italian television and film productions, including Fortapàsc.

== Early life and education ==
Carrington was born in 1949 in New Jersey. He attended Gonzaga College High School in Washington, D.C., then went to the University of Virginia on a football scholarship, graduating in 1971 with a degree in English.

Carrington moved to New York City in 1971 and attended NYU's graduate acting program.

== Career ==
=== Acting ===
Carrington began his professional acting career on Broadway, appearing in the play Legend alongside Elizabeth Ashley, F. Murray Abraham, and George Dzundza. He was in many Off-Broadway works, notably performing in A 1001 Nights in a Night directed by his friend Gerry Bamman, who played Uncle Frank in the Home Alone films.

His first film role was starring in the Martha Coolidge landmark hybrid 1976 documentary Not a Pretty Picture. He went on to appear in several major 1980s films, including The Boys Next Door, St. Elmo's Fire, playing opposite Andie MacDowell, and the cult comedy Real Genius starring Val Kilmer. His television credits included guest roles on popular series such as Charlie's Angels, Dynasty, CHiPs, Strike Force, and The Dukes of Hazzard.

=== Screenwriting ===
Carrington transitioned into screenwriting while working as a special actor's consultant for Marlee Matlin on the set of Children of a Lesser God (1986). In addition to appearing in the film, he was an uncredited writer on the film. Children of a Lesser God went on to receive Academy Award and Writers Guild of America nominations for Best Adapted Screenplay.

He served as a scenario consultant on Torrents of Spring (1989) before authoring several screenplays of his own, including Genghis Khan: The Story of a Lifetime, Wild Justice, and Fluke (1995).

In the 1990s, Carrington moved to Italy, where he established a successful career writing for Italian cinema and television (often credited as Jim Carrington). His Italian credits include:

- Iqbal (1998)
- Caravaggio (2008) – nominated for a Magnolia Award for Best Writing at the Shanghai International Film Festival.
- Coco Chanel (2008) – a television movie nominated for two Primetime Emmy Awards and a Critics' Choice Award.
- Fortapàsc (2009) – for which he received a David di Donatello nomination for Best Screenplay.

== Personal life and death ==
Carrington was married to Italian actress Antonella Murgia until her death in 2014. In 2024, he married actress Rae C. Wright.

Carrington died in New York City on April 30, 2025, at the age of 75.

== Filmography ==
Year	Title	Role	Notes
1976	Not a Pretty Picture	Jim	Film
1985	St. Elmo's Fire	Guy	Film
1985	Real Genius	Carter	Film
1986	Children of a Lesser God	Glen	Also uncredited screenwriter
1995	Fluke	—	Screenwriter
2008	Caravaggio	—	Screenwriter; TV miniseries
2008	Coco Chanel	—	Screenwriter; TV movie
2009	Fortapàsc	—	Screenwriter
