= Mark Amin =

Iranian American film producer, director, screenwriter

- مارک امین
- Born: Rafsanjan, Iran
- Education: University of California, Los Angeles (MBA); University of Kansas (BA)
- Occupations: Film producer, writer, investor
- Years active: 1984-present
- Known for: Vidmark; Trimark Pictures; Sobini Films

Mohammed Mark Amin (Persian: محمد مارک امین) is an Iranian American motion picture producer, writer, director, and distributor who has been working in independent and mainstream cinema for more than three decades. Some of Amin's film credits include The Prince and Me (2004), starring Julia Stiles, 1997's Eve's Bayou, starring Samuel L. Jackson, and 2002's Frida, a biopic which Amin executive produced.

Amin was producer for the Lionsgate/Roadside Attractions film Girl Most Likely (2012), starring Annette Bening and Matt Dillon, as well as producer for Eliza Graves (2014), starring Kate Beckinsale, Jim Sturgess, Ben Kingsley and Michael Caine. Amin is the founder and CEO of the production company Sobini Films.

Besides his career as a film producer, Amin has also been active in other business and investment interests. Amin is an investor and member of the advisory board of EdgeCast, a content delivery firm which sold in 2013 to Verizon for $400 million. He is also chairman and major shareholder of gymra.com, the fitness website. Additionally, Amin is active in the development of almond and pistachio orchards in central California.

== Early life and education ==
Amin is originally from Rafsanjan, a small town in Iran. Raised in a family that was in the pistachio trading business, Amin immigrated to the United States in 1967, finishing out his last year of high school in Colorado.

In 1972, Amin graduated from the University of Kansas with a degree in economics. After earning his bachelor's degree, Amin attended New York University's business school for one semester. However, New York City proved too overwhelming and Amin transferred to the Graduate School of Management at the University of California, Los Angeles. Amin graduated from the management school with a Masters of Business Administration in Marketing in 1975.

== Career ==
=== Early career ===
After graduating from management school, Amin worked for Western Gear, a construction machinery firm, and returned to Iran as the company's representative.

In 1979, political and military conflict arose in Iran. As a result, Amin moved to Europe and then returned to Los Angeles. Following his return, Amin became involved in a number of businesses, including real estate, petrochemicals and commodities.

=== Early film career ===
Amin's career in the film industry started in the early 1980s through his involvement with a chain of video stores in Los Angeles known as 20/20 Video. In 1985, Amin formed Vidmark Entertainment, an "aggressive independent supplier" of video releases operating in the early era of home video entertainment. Among their niches was obtaining the videocassette rights to television films often made as TV movies of the week. It was with the financial success of Vidmark's early video releases that inspired Amin to further expand his efforts as a producer.

=== Trimark Pictures ===
With an initial investment of $270,000, Amin co-founded Trimark Holdings, a company which would include among its subsidiaries, Trimark Pictures, Trimark Television and Trimark Interactive. Amin was chairman and CEO of the newly formed company. Trimark Pictures went on to release such titles as Warlock (1989), The Dentist (1996) and the Leprechaun franchise (the first of which starred a young Jennifer Aniston).

In 2000, Trimark merged with Lions Gate Entertainment in a move that made Amin Lionsgate's single largest shareholder, as well as its vice chairman. During Amin's nine-year tenure as vice chairman of Lionsgate, the company's revenue grew from $184 million to $1.2 billion. The production company also produced and distributed film releases that included Monster's Ball (2001), starring Halle Berry, which earned her an Academy Award for Best Actress, and Academy Award for Best Picture-winner, Crash (2004).

During this time, Amin also became chairman of CinemaNow, an online independent film distributor.

=== Sobini Films ===
In 2001, Amin founded Sobini Films, a production company focused on producing specialized and mainstream commercial films. Since its founding, Sobini Films has produced a number of films, including Streets of Legend (2003), a Sundance award winner, An American Girl: Chrissa Stands Strong (2009) and "Sexy Evil Genius" (2013). Sobini assisted in the production of Miles Ahead, starring Don Cheadle and Ewan McGregor, and also was a producer for Good Kill (2015) with Ethan Hawke.

His feature-length debut as a writer and director was 2020's Emperor, which was released by Briarcliff Entertainment and Universal Pictures. Amin also was a producer.

Amin also oversees Sobini's slate of pictures in development.

=== Controversy over DuPont Fabros Technology Inc. Stock ===
In 2012, the SEC alleged that Mark Amin learned confidential information about expanding business opportunities for DuPont Fabros Technology Inc., which develops and manages facilities that maintain large computer servers for technology companies. It was alleged that Amin tipped his brother and cousin with this confidential information. The three allegedly illegally traded on the basis of that inside information and allegedly gained profits from this insider trading. Mark Amin and five others agreed to settle the SEC's charges by collectively paying nearly $2 million.

== Personal life ==
=== Philanthropic efforts and contributions ===
In 1997, Amin donated $25,000 to the University of Kansas to start a scholarship for those students studying film at the school.

In 2000, Amin and his brother, Reza Amin, formed the Bijan and Soraya Amin Foundation, which has helped support organizations that include the National Ability Center, the Brady Center to Prevent Gun Violence, the University Muslim Medical Association.

In 2011, Amin produced a documentary entitled "Jujitsu-ing Reality" on Scott Lew, a screenwriter with amyotrophic lateral sclerosis, or ALS. On May 29, 2014, Amin was recognized for increasing support and awareness of ALS at the ALS Association Golden West Chapter A Night at the Esseys Awards.

Amin is a member of the Board of Trustees of the Farhang Foundation, an organization that promotes the study and research of Iranian art and culture.

=== Recognition ===
In 2010, Amin earned an Alumni Distinguished Achievement Award from his alma mater, the University of Kansas.

== Filmography ==
=== Theatrical releases ===
Year	Film	Producer	Writer	Other	Notes
1988	Demonwarp			Yes	executive producer
1990	The Sleeping Car			Yes	executive producer
1990	Farendj			Yes	executive producer
1990	Mob Boss			Yes	executive producer
1991	Black Magic Woman			Yes	executive producer
1991	Servants of Twilight			Yes	executive producer
1991	Whore			Yes	executive producer
1992	Into the Sun			Yes	executive producer
1993	Leprechaun			Yes	executive producer
1993	Interceptor			Yes	executive producer
1993	Extreme Justice			Yes	executive producer
1993	Deadfall			Yes	executive producer
1993	Philadelphia Experiment II			Yes	executive producer
1994	Dangerous Touch			Yes	executive producer
1994	Final Mission			Yes	executive producer
1994	Leprechaun 2			Yes	executive producer
1994	A Million to Juan			Yes	executive producer
1994	Love and a .45			Yes	executive producer
1994	Curse of the Starving Class			Yes	executive producer
1994	The Stöned Age			Yes	executive producer
1994	Frank and Jesse			Yes	executive producer
1995	Night of the Running Man			Yes	executive producer
1995	Evolver			Yes	executive producer
1995	Aurora: Operation Intercept			Yes	executive producer
1995	Leprechaun 3			Yes	executive producer
1995	Separate Lives	Yes			
1995	True Crime			Yes	executive producer
1995	A Kid in King Arthur's Court			Yes	executive producer
1995	Kicking and Screaming			Yes	executive producer
1995	Iron Eagle IV			Yes	executive producer
1996	Leprechaun 4: In Space			Yes	executive producer
1996	Crossworlds			Yes	executive producer
1996	Underworld			Yes	executive producer
1996	The Dentist			Yes	executive producer
1996	Two Guys Talkin' About Girls			Yes	executive producer
1996	The Maddening			Yes	executive producer
1996	Sometimes They Come Back... Again			Yes	executive producer
1996	Never Ever			Yes	executive producer
1996	Pinocchio's Revenge			Yes	executive producer
1997	Sprung			Yes	executive producer
1997	Eve's Bayou			Yes	executive producer
1997	Trucks			Yes	executive producer, TV movie
1997	A Kid in Aladdin's Palace			Yes	executive producer
1997	Star Kid			Yes	executive producer
1998	Standoff			Yes	executive producer
1998	Bay Watch: White Thunder at Glacier Bay	Yes		Yes	co-producer
1998	Chairman of the Board			Yes	executive producer
1998	The Dentist 2			Yes	executive producer
1998	Carnival of Souls			Yes	executive producer
1998	Ground Control			Yes	executive producer
1998	Trance	Yes			
1998	Ava's Magical Adventure			Yes	executive producer
1999	Let the Devil Wear Black			Yes	executive producer
1999	King Cobra			Yes	executive producer
1999	Diplomatic Siege		Yes	Yes	executive producer, screenplay and story writer
1999	The Simple Life of Noah Dearborn			Yes	executive producer, TV movie
1999	Warlock III: The End of Innocence			Yes	executive producer
1999	Turbulence 2: Fear of Flying			Yes	executive producer
1999	Held Up			Yes	executive producer
2000	Cord			Yes	executive producer
2000	Skipped Parts			Yes	executive producer
2000	The Bogus Witch Project			Yes	executive producer, TV movie
2000	Attraction			Yes	executive producer
2000	Blood Surf			Yes	executive producer
2000	Xchange			Yes	executive producer
2001	After the Storm			Yes	executive producer, TV movie
2002	Framed			Yes	executive producer, TV movie
2002	Frida			Yes	executive producer
2003	Quattro Noza			Yes	executive producer
2004	The Prince & Me	Yes	Yes	Yes	story writer
2006	The Prince & Me 2: The Royal Wedding		Yes	Yes	characters
2006	Peaceful Warrior	Yes			
2008	Gardens of the Night			Yes	executive producer
2008	The Prince & Me: A Royal Honeymoon			Yes	executive producer
2009	An American Girl: Chrissa Stands Strong	Yes		Yes	executive producer
2010	Burning Bright	Yes			
2011	Jujitsuing Reality	Yes			Documentary short
2012	Girl Most Likely	Yes			
2013	Sexy Evil Genius	Yes			
2013	Filth	Yes			
2014	Stonehearst Asylum	Yes			
2014	I Live for You	Yes			
2014	Good Kill	Yes			
