= Amy Wright =

American actress and former model

- Born: Chicago, Illinois, U.S.
- Education: Beloit College
- Occupations: Actress, model
- Years active: 1976–present
- Spouse: Rip Torn (m. 1989; died 2019)
- Children: 2

Amy Wright is an American actress and former model. She has appeared in such films as Not a Pretty Picture, The Deer Hunter, Breaking Away, The Accidental Tourist, Hard Promises, Crossing Delancey, and Miss Firecracker. She is the widow of actor Rip Torn.

== Early years ==
Born in Chicago, Wright is a graduate of Beloit College. Her father was a professor of psychology at the University of Chicago. She developed an interest in acting when she was in high school. Encouragement from a teacher at an acting workshop led her to appear in school plays, and she majored in theater arts at Beloit. After that, she taught high school in Stockbridge, Massachusetts. During that time she acted in summer stock theater.

== Career ==
Wright acted in summer-stock productions in Rockford, Illinois, before going to New York, where she studied acting with Uta Hagen. She was directed by Martha Coolidge in Not a Pretty Picture (1976); later she starred with Eric Schweig in The Scarlet Letter and Tom and Huck (both made in 1995). She produced a Netflix series called The Next Step.

Wright starred in the original production of Breakfast with Les and Bess as Shelby. Wright also appeared on Broadway in the original productions of Fifth of July and Noises Off. Wright currently is on the faculty of HB Studio in New York City.

== Personal life ==
Wright was married to actor Rip Torn when he died in 2019, and the couple had two daughters, Katie and Claire Torn.

== Filmography ==
=== Film ===
Year	Title	Role	Notes
1976	Not a Pretty Picture	Cindy	
1978	Girlfriends	Ceil	
1978	The Deer Hunter	Bridesmaid	
1979	Breaking Away	Nancy	
1979	The Amityville Horror	Jackie	
1979	Heartland	Clara Jane	
1979	Wise Blood	Sabbath Lily	
1980	Stardust Memories	Shelley	
1980	Inside Moves	Anne	
1985	Beer	Stacy	
1986	Off Beat	Mary Ellen Gruenwald	
1988	The Telephone	Honey Boxe / Various	
1988	Crossing Delancey	Ricki	
1988	The Accidental Tourist	Rose Leary	
1989	Miss Firecracker	Missy Mahoney	
1990	Daddy's Dyin': Who's Got the Will?	Lurlene Turnover	
1990	Love Hurts	Karen Weaver	
1991	Hard Promises	Shelly	
1991	Deceived	Evelyn	
1993	Where the Rivers Flow North	Loose Woman	
1993	Josh and S.A.M.	Waitress	
1994	Robot in the Family	Kristina Shamir	
1995	The Scarlet Letter	Goody Gotwick	
1995	Tom and Huck	Aunt Polly	
1999	Joe the King	Mary	
1999	Day and an Arabian Knight	Day	Short film
2001	Besotted	Mona	
2002	Winning Girls Through Psychic Mind Control	Psychiatrist	
2004	Messengers	Nan Parrish	
2006	The Namesake	Pam	
2006	The Good Shepherd	Safe House Operations Officer	
2008	Synecdoche, New York	Burning House Realtor	
2009	Scratch... Play for Keeps	Ma	Short film
2010	Please Give	Erin	
2025	A Blind Bargain	Mature Joy	

=== Television ===
Year	Title	Role	Notes
1980	Special Treat	Bobba June	"Sunshine's on the Way"
1983	A Fine Romance	Jean	TV film
1986	Trapped in Silence	Dana Wendolowski	TV film
1989	Men	Joyce	"The Trouble with Harvey"
1989	Settle the Score	Becky	TV film
1991	In the Line of Duty: Manhunt in the Dakotas	Karen	TV film
1991	Final Verdict	Queenie	TV film
1991	Lethal Innocence	Margaret Stokely	TV film
1993	To Dance with the White Dog	Carrie	TV film
2001	Amy & Isabelle	Rosie	TV film
2002	Undeclared	Debra Karp	"Parents' Weekend"
2005	Law & Order: Criminal Intent	Sister Dorothy	"Acts of Contrition"
2011	Wingin' It	Choreographer / School Teacher	"Me Carl, You Jane-ish", "Friday Afternoon Fever"
2019	Private Eyes	Choreographer	"Dance, Dance Retribution"
