= The Prince & Me 2: The Royal Wedding =

- DVD cover
- Directed by: Catherine Cyran
- Written by: Allison Robinson
- Based on: Characters by Mark Amin; Katherine Fugate
- Produced by: Cami Wikikoff; Robin Schorr; Mike Elliott
- Starring: Luke Mably; Kam Heskin; Clemency Burton-Hill; Jonathan Firth; Jim Holt
- Cinematography: Blake T. Evans
- Edited by: Jack Tucker; David Byron Lloyd
- Music by: Andrew Gross
- Production companies: DEJ Productions; Capital Arts Entertainment; Sobini Films
- Distributed by: First Look Studios
- Release date: February 21, 2006
- Running time: 96 minutes
- Country: United States
- Language: English

The Prince & Me 2: The Royal Wedding is a 2006 American romantic comedy film and the sequel to the 2004 film The Prince & Me and was released direct-to-video. Directed by Catherine Cyran, the film features Luke Mably reprising his role as King Edvard of Denmark, with Kam Heskin replacing Julia Stiles as Paige Morgan and Clemency Burton-Hill as newcomer Princess Kirsten of Norway. This film is followed by the 2008 sequel The Prince & Me: A Royal Honeymoon.

== Plot ==
Newly crowned King Edvard of Denmark (Luke Mably) and his American fiancée Paige Morgan (Kam Heskin) have been engaged for two years and Paige goes to medical school in Denmark to be with Edvard and his family. Just weeks before their wedding, however, they find their relationship in jeopardy when an old law is brought to light, one that requires a Danish king to be married to a princess, or be forced to abdicate and relinquish the crown. Edvard's childhood friend, Princess Kirsten (Clemency Burton-Hill), comes for a visit and plots to try to steal Edvard from Paige, both for her personal reasons (to become Queen of Denmark) and that her father, a Norwegian royal, is heavily in debt and seeks to marry Kirsten into the royal family's money.

At one point Kirsten offers to help Paige with her study of the Danish language per a Danish marriage law. When Paige is asked to say something in Danish she answers with "The queen is a green donkey that shakes bum and pees on flowers", which both offends and puzzles the royal family. It is revealed that she meant to say "The queen has a green thumb and she waves her hand and flowers grow". The stress caused by the law causes Paige and Edvard to break up. Edvard decides to marry Kirsten. Paige decides to stay in Denmark to finish her semester. During the wedding planning of Kirsten and Edvard, Paige sees through Edvard's body language that he does not love Kirsten and is only going through the motions.

Paige is able to find a loophole in the succession law with the help of her friend Jake and his friends, who are law students. The newer law, written 41 years after the marriage law, states that any woman can be crowned a princess if she can demonstrate knowledge of the Danish Constitution by reading it in Danish before the Parliament. Luckily the Danish Parliament is present at the wedding, the Constitution is read, and the happy couple marries. Before they can kiss, however, Kirsten barges in with a mud-covered torn wedding dress. She is eventually dragged off by her father while she screams "I love you Edvard" and after that Edvard and the now Queen Paige kiss. The film ends with the newlyweds leaving the church.

== Cast ==
- Kam Heskin as Paige Morgan. Heskin replaces Julia Stiles in the role from the previous film.
- Luke Mably as Edvard III, King of Denmark
- Maryam d'Abo as Rosalind, the Queen Mother/former Queen of Denmark
- David Fellowes as Haraald, the King Father/former King of Denmark
- Jonathan Firth as Søren
- Clemency Burton-Hill as Princess Kirsten
- Jim Holt as Prince Albert
- Daniel Cerny as Jake
- David Fisher as Doctor
- Mirek Hrabe as Prince Vladimir
- Paulína Bakarová as Princess Gabrielle (as Paulina Nemcova)
- Lana Likic as Princess Carmilla
- Dan Brown as Bishop
- Andrea Miltner as Birgitta
- Zdenek Maryska as Mr. Christianson
