= Olivia Burnette =

American actress

- Born: March 24, 1977 (age 49); San Clemente, California, U.S.
- Education: New York University Tisch School of the Arts
- Occupations: Actress; producer
- Years active: 1985–2014
- Known for: The Torkelsons; Sons of Anarchy; The Quick and the Dead
- Spouse: Patrick Wolff Julian Sakata
- Relatives: Justin Burnette (brother)

Olivia Burnette (born March 24, 1977) is an American retired actress who began her career as a child actress at the age of six. She is perhaps best known for her role in the NBC sitcom The Torkelsons (1991–1993), Homeless Woman in Sons of Anarchy (2008-2014), and Steve Martin's daughter in Planes, Trains and Automobiles (1987).

== Early life ==
She was born in San Clemente, California, USA. She left her native California to receive a college education. Burnette enrolled in NYU's Tisch School of the Arts. Olivia graduated with a double major in Film and English.

== Career ==
Burnette began her career at age 10, portraying Steve Martin's daughter in Planes, Trains and Automobiles in 1987. Perhaps her most famous role was that of Dorothy Jane Torkelson on the NBC sitcom The Torkelsons, later renamed Almost Home. She also played two roles on the NBC series Quantum Leap, making a guest appearance in the episode "Another Mother" before later appearing as Sam's sister Katie in the episode "The Leap Home." She has since appeared on both JAG and its spin off, NCIS (playing different characters). From 2008-2014, Burnette appeared in a recurring role in Sons of Anarchy.

In 1991, Burnette co-starred in the TNT drama Final Verdict.

Burnette also produced the short film, Mountain Cry.

== Personal life ==
Olivia was married to musician Julian Sakata. She is currently married to Patrick Wolff, the son of British singer Petula Clark.

== Filmography ==
=== Film ===
Year	Title	Role	Notes
1987	Planes, Trains and Automobiles	Marti Page	
1991	Hard Promises	Beth	
1995	The Quick and the Dead	Katie Pinnick	
1996	Eye for an Eye	Julie McCann	
1998	Jekyll Island	Savannah Goodyear	
1998	Children of the Corn V: Fields of Terror	Lily	Video
2001	Bully	Jennifer Stable	
2006	Flourish	Bridget Burnham	

=== Television ===
Year	Title	Role	Notes
1985	Riptide	Lulu Flynn	Episode: "Robin and Marian"
1986	Webster	Carol	Episode: "McGruff"
1986 & 1988	Our House	Joanie	Episodes: "See You in Court" & "Artful Dodging"
1987	Celebration Family	Ellie	TV movie
1988	Designing Women	Hannah Shackelford	Episode: "Great Expectations"
1988	A Stoning in Fulham County	Rachel	TV movie
1988	Disaster at Silo 7	Jennifer Fitzgerald	TV movie
1990	Paradise	Edith	Episode: "Dangerous Cargo"
1990	Jake and the Fatman	Holly	Episode: "My Buddy"
1990	Why, Charlie Brown, Why?	Janice Emmons (voice)	Short
1990	Casey's Gift: For the Love of a Child	Mickey Bolen	TV movie
1990	Quantum Leap	Susan Bruckner / Katie Beckett	Episodes: "Another Mother" & "The Leap Home: part 1"
1990	Charles in Charge	Melanie Colfax	Episode: "Fair Exchange"
1991	Wings	Becky	Episode: "Duet for Cello and Plane"
1991	Final Verdict	Nora Rogers	TV movie
1991	Backfield in Motion	Betsy Dooley	TV movie
1991–1993	The Torkelsons	Dorothy Jane Torkelson	Main role
1992	A Murderous Affair: The Carolyn Warmus Story	Kristan Solomon	TV movie
1992	Willing to Kill: The Texas Cheerleader Story	Shanna Harper	TV movie
1994	The Gift of Love	Louise	TV movie
1996	The Thorn Birds: The Missing Years	Justine O'Neill	TV miniseries
1998	JAG	Marie Wetzel	Episode: "Father's Day"
1999	Mercy Point	Val	Episodes: "Battle Scars", "C.J."
2000	Up, Up, and Away!	Nina	TV movie
2001	The Ballad of Lucy Whipple	Annie Flagg	TV movie
2001	A Mother's Testimony	Dede Carlson	TV movie
2003	Peacemakers	Molly	Episode: "No Excuse"
2004	CSI: NY	Madison Haynes	Episode: "Grand Master"
2004	Halo 2	ILB: Rani Sobek (voice)	Video game
2005	NCIS	Sarah Lowell	Episode: "SWAK"
2008–2014	Sons of Anarchy	Homeless Woman	Recurring role
2009	Dexter	Pam	Episode: "Dirty Harry"
2010	The Closer	Ann Weber	Episode: "Off the Hook"
