= Celebration Family =

1987 television film directed by Robert Day

- Genre: Drama
- Directed by: Robert Day
- Starring: James Read; Stephanie Zimbalist
- Music by: Fred Karlin
- Country of origin: United States
- Original language: English

Production
- Executive producers: Robert M. Sertner; Frank von Zerneck
- Cinematography: Steven Shaw
- Running time: 91 min.
- Production company: Von Zerneck-Samuels Productions

Original release
- Network: ABC
- Release: May 24, 1987

Celebration Family (1987) is a made for television drama film. It is based on the real story of a married couple, James and Janet Marston, who, after discovering that they are not able to have more children naturally, start to adopt instead. The result was a family of sixteen children, who were often sick, disabled or suffered from behavioural problems.

== Starring ==
- James Read as James Marston
- Stephanie Zimbalist as Janet Marston
- Royce D. Applegate as Shawn
- Ed Begley, Jr. as Jake Foreman
- Olivia Burnette as Ellie
- Anne Haney as Judge Gelson
- Vaughn Tyree Jelks as Ricky
- Diane Ladd as Mrs. Heflin

== Trivia ==
Olivia Burnette was nominated in 1988 for the Young Artist Awards as the Best Young Actress Under Ten Years of Age in Television or Motion Pictures.
