= Jessica Regan =

Irish actress

- Born: 24 February 1982 (age 44); Kilkenny, Ireland
- Education: University College Cork; Royal Academy of Dramatic Art
- Occupation: Actress
- Years active: 2004–present
- Television: Doctors

Jessica Regan (born 24 February 1982) is an Irish actress, known for portraying the role of Niamh Donoghue in the BBC soap opera Doctors. For her portrayal of that role, she won the award for Best Female Acting Performance at the 2014 RTS Midlands Awards, as well as the award for Best Newcomer at the 2015 British Soap Awards. Following her departure from Doctors, she starred in the BBC series Ill Behaviour.

== Early life ==
Regan was born on 24 February 1982 in Kilkenny, and grew up in County Tipperary. She attended University College Cork (UCC), since the majority of her family live in Cork. At UCC, she studied English and History.

== Career ==
In 2004, at the age of 22, Regan made her stage debut as Charlotte in a one-woman production of The Yellow Wallpaper. She described the show as the "catalyst" for her motivation to begin acting professionally, stating: "I wasn't sure if I had the ability or the stomach for acting and The Yellow Wallpaper helped me to figure that out". Afterwards, she told her parents that she wanted to study acting at the Royal Academy of Dramatic Art (RADA) in London, to which she stated that they were "not surprised". She then borrowed the money for the train fare to Dublin from her parents in order to audition for a place at RADA, to which she was accepted.

Regan made her television debut in the Channel 4 television film Ladies and Gentlemen in 2007, after graduating from RADA. In 2007, she made a guest appearance in an episode of the BBC daytime soap opera Doctors. Then in 2008, she appeared in an episode of the BBC soap opera EastEnders as Laura. In 2013, she appeared in another episode of Doctors. The following year, she was cast as a regular character in the soap, Dr. Niamh Donoghue. On the casting process, Regan expressed her shock at the casting call, since they wanted an Irish actress aged 30 to 33, which she found to be rare in her experience, especially with the role being regular.

For her portrayal of the role of Dr. Donoghue, she won the award for the Best Female Acting Performance at the 2014 RTS Midlands Awards, as well as the award for Best Newcomer at the 2015 British Soap Awards. Her other nominations include the British Soap Award for Best Actress and Best On-Screen Partnership, alongside co-star Ian Midlane. In 2016, after two years on the soap, Regan announced her departure from the role. She confirmed that the decision was her own, and her character departed from the series in April 2016 after being fired from her job.

In 2017, she starred in the BBC comedy-drama series Ill Behaviour, and appeared in an episode of the BBC drama Casualty the following year.

Shortly before leaving Doctors Jessica was cast as Cathleen in Eugene O’Neill’s Long Day’s Journey into Night directed by Richard Eyre and starring Jeremy Irons and Lesley Manville at Bristol Old Vic IN 2016. The production transferred to the West End and toured to BAM in New York and the Wallis Annenberg in Los Angeles.

In 2017, she starred in Alison Spittle’s sitcom Nowhere Fast for RTE, and Call the Midwife.

Jessica originated the role of Victorian boxer Matilda Blackwell in Joy Wilkinson’s play The Sweet Science of Bruising at the Southwark Playhouse and subsequently Wilton’s Music Hall. Jessica has appeared in two subsequent shorts written and directed by Joy Wilkinson, as Queen Victoria in ‘Ma’am’ (2019) and as Holly in ‘The Everlasting Club’ (2020).

In 2018 Jessica appeared on BBC’s Celebrity Mastermind. Her specialist subject were the films of Quentin Tarantino. Her research for the subject with friend and collaborator Tom Salinsky led to the idea of starting a film podcast. They enlisted actor and Big Finish writer John Dorney and created Best Pick, a podcast by The Spontaneity Shop in which they would research, watch and discuss every Best Picture winner in no particular order. In July 2020, Best Pick won the Bronze award in the Best Arts and Culture category at the British Podcast Awards and at the 2021 Lovie Awards for Best Arts and Entertainment Podcast.

She is a regular contributor to The Guilty Feminist podcast and co-founded ‘Big Speeches’ with Deborah Frances-White to make public speaking training affordable and accessible for all.

In 2022 the book ‘Best Pick: A Journey through Film History and the Academy Awards’ co- authored by Jessica was released, published by Rowan and Littlefield.

In 2023 Jessica again appeared at Southwark Playhouse in Strike! by Tracey Ryan directed by Kirsty Patrick Ward. The play gives an account of the Dunnes Stores Anti-Apartheid Strike which took place in Dublin from 1984 to 1987. Jessica played real-life striker and humanitarian Karen Gearon.

In 2024 Jessica brought her debut solo show ’16 Postcodes’ to the Edinburgh Fringe Festival. The show sold out multiple performances and was a critical success with The Scotsman rating it four stars and calling it ‘A delightful hour of theatre’ and Lyn Gardner describing Jessica as ‘a born storyteller’. The show transferred to the Kings Head Theatre London in 2026

Jessica is a prolific audio artist, appearing in multiple video game franchises including ‘Baldur’s Gate III’, Witcher III: Wild Hunt and Assassins Creed Valhalla. She has appeared several audios for Big Finish.

Jessica narrates audiobooks regularly, most notably for Irish authors Andrea Mara (All Her Fault, Such a Nice Girl) and Liz Nugent (Strange Sally Diamond, The Truth About Ruby Cooper).

== Stage ==
Year	Title	Role	Venue	Ref.
2004–2005	The Yellow Wallpaper	Charlotte	Mall Arts Centre	
2009	The Flags	Ursula	Royal Court	
2010	Blood and Gifts	Cal Foster	National Theatre	
2011	The Cherry Orchard	Ensemble	National Theatre	
2012	The Kitchen	Cynthia	National Theatre	
2012	Stars in the Morning Sky	Anna	Belgrade Theatre	
2012	Coalition	Claudia Hood	Pleasance	
2013	Liolà	Tuzza Azzara	National Theatre	
2016	Henry V	Montjoy	Regent's Park Open Air Theatre	
2017	Long Day's Journey into Night	Cathleen	Wyndham's Theatre	
2019	The Sweet Science of Bruising	Matilda Blackwell	Southwark Playhouse	
2020	The Year of the Monkey	Various	Chelsea Physic Garden	
2023	Strike!	Karen Gearon	Southwark Playhouse	
2024-2026	16 Postcodes	Herself	Pleasance Theatre and King’s Head Theatre	

== Filmography ==
Year	Title	Role	Notes
2007	Ladies and Gentlemen	Susanna	Television film
2007	Doctors	Lisa Geary	Episode: "Post Mortem"
2008	Peep Show	Actress in Play	Episode: "Burgling"
2008	EastEnders	Laura	1 episode
2009	The Wrong Door	Various	3 episodes
2009	No Signal!		3 episodes
2010	Silent Witness	PC Justine Gould	2 episodes
2012	Execution	Molly Childers	
2013	Doctors	Philomena Caffrey	Episode: "Child Proof"
2014–2016	Doctors	Niamh Donoghue	Series regular
2014	This Morning	Herself	Guest
2017	Call the Midwife	Nurse Leonard	1 episode
2017	Halloween Comedy Shorts	Caroline	Episode: "It Should Have Been Me"
2017	Nowhere Fast	Yvonne	Main role
2017	Ill Behaviour	Tess	Main role
2018	Celebrity Mastermind	Herself	Contestant
2018	Casualty	Maxine O'Boyle	1 episode
2020	Ma'am	Queen Victoria	Short film
2021	The Everlasting Club	Holly	Short film
2026	A Tidy Town	Betty	Feature film

== Audio ==
Year	Title	Role	Platform
2010	The Cider Queens	Martina Beausang	RTÉ Radio 1
2011	A Time to Dance	Jill Gladstone	BBC Radio 4
2013	Soul Sacrifice	Various	Video game
2016	The Witcher 3: Wild Hunt – Blood and Wine	Sarah Godley	Video game
2017	Nioh	Saoirse	Video game
2017	The Guilty Feminist	Herself	Podcast
2020	Assassin's Creed Valhalla	Various	Video game
2023	No One Saw A Thing	Various	Audio Book
2023	Baldur’s Gate 3	Zethino	Video game
2023-2024	New Worldsin's	Grace O’Malley	Video game
2024	Someone in the Attic	Various	Audio Book
2024	Jenny The Doctor’s Daughter	Florence O’Connor	Big Finish Audio Drama
2025	The Wowen on Platform Two	Various	Audio Book
2025	The Girl on the Cliff	Various	Audio Book
2026	Friday Slattery as Herself	Various	Audio Book
2026	The Truth about Ruby Cooper	Various	Audio Book
2026	Everything She Didn’t Say	Various	Audio Book
2026	Such a Nice Girl	Various	Audio Book

== Awards and nominations ==
Year	Award	Category	Nominated work	Result	Ref.
2014	RTS Midlands Awards	Best Acting Performance – Female	Doctors	Won	
2015	The British Soap Awards	Best Actress	Doctors	Longlisted	
2015	The British Soap Awards	Best Newcomer	Doctors	Won	
2015	The British Soap Awards	Best On-Screen Partnership (with Ian Midlane)	Doctors	Nominated	
2015	Inside Soap Awards	Best Daytime Star	Doctors	Longlisted	
2021	British Podcast Awards	Best Arts and Culture Podcast	Best Pick	Bronze	
