= Final Verdict =

- Genre: Drama
- Written by: Lawrence Roman; Adela Rogers St. Johns
- Directed by: Jack Fisk
- Starring: Treat Williams; Glenn Ford; Ashley Crow; Olivia Burnette; Dana Hill
- Theme music composer: Stewart Copeland
- Country of origin: United States
- Original language: English

Production
- Executive producer: Nelle Nugent
- Producer: George Manasse
- Production locations: Houston, Texas; Galveston, Texas; Richmond, Texas; Rosenberg, Texas
- Cinematography: Paul Elliott
- Editor: Andrew Mondshein
- Running time: 93 minutes
- Production companies: Foxboro Company Productions; Turner Pictures

Original release
- Network: TNT
- Release: September 9, 1991

Final Verdict is a 1991 TNT drama film starring Treat Williams, Olivia Burnette and Glenn Ford. It was directed by Jack Fisk. The movie is based on the 1962 biography of the same title by Hearst journalist Adela Rogers St. Johns. The book and the movie tell the story of her father, Los Angeles defense attorney Earl Rogers. It has been speculated that Erle Stanley Gardner based the character Perry Mason on Rogers. (The author is depicted under her middle name, "Nora.")

This was the last work of Hollywood legend Glenn Ford, and the last onscreen appearance of actress Dana Hill, who died in 1996 at just 32.

== Plot ==
This story takes place in the 1920s, where the successful and controversial defense attorney Earl Rogers is known for his controversial behavior in the courtroom and for his innovative methods. His father, the Reverend Rogers, instilled in his children moral values which Rogers puts into practice during the trial. He has a beautiful and faithful wife named Belle, and daughter Nora.

== Cast ==
Actor	Role
Treat Williams	Earl Rogers Attorney
Glenn Ford	Reverend Rogers
Olivia Burnette	Nora Rogers
Ashley Crow	Belle Rogers
Barton Heyman	Bill Jory
Raphael Sbarge	Al Boyd
Fionnula Flanagan	Pearl Morton
Amy Wright	"Queenie"
Dana Hill	Francy
Lance Kerwin	Harry Johnson
