= The Greening of Whitney Brown =

- Theatrical release poster
- Directed by: Peter Skillman Odiorne
- Written by: Gail Gilchriest
- Produced by: Justin Moore-Lewy; Charlie Mason
- Starring: Sammi Hanratty; Brooke Shields; Aidan Quinn; Kris Kristofferson
- Edited by: Martin Hunter
- Music by: Randy Edelman
- Production companies: Perfect Weekend; Heavy Lifting
- Distributed by: ARC Entertainment
- Release date: November 11, 2011
- Country: United States
- Language: English

The Greening of Whitney Brown is a 2011 adventure film directed by Peter Skillman Odiorne. It stars Aidan Quinn, Brooke Shields, Kris Kristofferson and Sammi Hanratty. The film received a limited theatrical release on November 11, 2011.

== Plot ==
Whitney Brown (Sammi Hanratty), a privileged and popular Philadelphia teenager, nominates herself and her best friend, Lindsay, for class president (which they win because they promised to throw the best school formal). Her mother, Joan (Brooke Shields), then gives her a credit card so she can buy a dress for the formal. After Whitney does a great deal of shopping, Joan's credit card is eventually declined. Later, they see on television that the office where Whitney's father, Henry (Aidan Quinn), works has declared bankruptcy. This means her father is now unemployed and her family will be destitute. The bank repossesses everything they have and Whitney's world becomes upended.

Her family has to move to Whitney's grandparents' old farm in the country. There, far from her dizzying world of shallow girlfriends, endless parties, and school pressures, she finds a new best pal: Bob, a beautiful and spirited Gypsy (Vanner) horse belonging to her new neighbor. The neighbor, Dusty (Kris Kristofferson), is a crusty rancher who turns out to be her estranged grandfather. Through her new relationships with Bob, Dusty, and her parents, Whitney rediscovers what it means to respect not only nature and her family, but also someone very special she had almost lost touch with: herself. At her new school, she feels like a fish out of water, having no contact with her old friends for months. She has to accept the way things are now or do something about it.

== Cast ==
- Sammi Hanratty as Whitney Brown
- Brooke Shields as Joan Brown
- Aidan Quinn as Henry Brown
- Kris Kristofferson as Dustin "Dusty" Brown
- Charlotte Matthews as Lindsay
- Wilbur Fitzgerald as Stanley
- Keith David as Clerk
- Slade Pearce as Ben
- Anna Colwell as Alicia
- Natalia Dyer as Lily
- Lily Rashid as Olivia
- Kodie Lake as Zack
- Cameron Gaskins as Josh

== Filming locations ==
The movie was filmed at Agnes Scott College - 141 E. College Avenue, Decatur, Georgia, and Atlanta. Filming also took place in the small town of Bowersville, Georgia located in Hart County.

== Home media ==
The film was released on DVD on January 3, 2012.

== See also ==
- List of films about horses
