= Caravaggio (miniseries) =

2008 Italian miniseries

- Genre: Biographical drama
- Screenplay by: James Carrington; Andrea Purgatori
- Directed by: Angelo Longoni
- Starring: Alessio Boni; Elena Sofia Ricci; Jordi Mollà
- Theme music composer: Luis Enríquez Bacalov
- Original language: Italian

Production
- Cinematography: Vittorio Storaro
- Running time: 180 min.

Original release
- Network: Rai 1
- Release: February 17 – February 18, 2008

Caravaggio is a 2008 Italian television miniseries directed by Angelo Longoni. The film is based on real life events of Baroque painter Michelangelo Merisi da Caravaggio.

== Cast ==
- Alessio Boni as Caravaggio
- Elena Sofia Ricci as Costanza Colonna
- Jordi Mollà as Francesco Maria del Monte
- Claire Keim as Fillide Melandroni
- Paolo Briguglia as Mario Minniti
- Benjamin Sadler as Onorio Longhi
- Sarah Felberbaum as Lena
- Maurizio Donadoni as Ranuccio Tomassoni
- Maria Elena Vandone as Beatrice Cenci
- Luigi Diberti as Scipione Borghese
- Ruben Rigillo as Fabrizio Colonna
- Joachim Bißmeier as Cardinal Gonzaga
