= Sammi Hanratty =

American actress (born 1995)

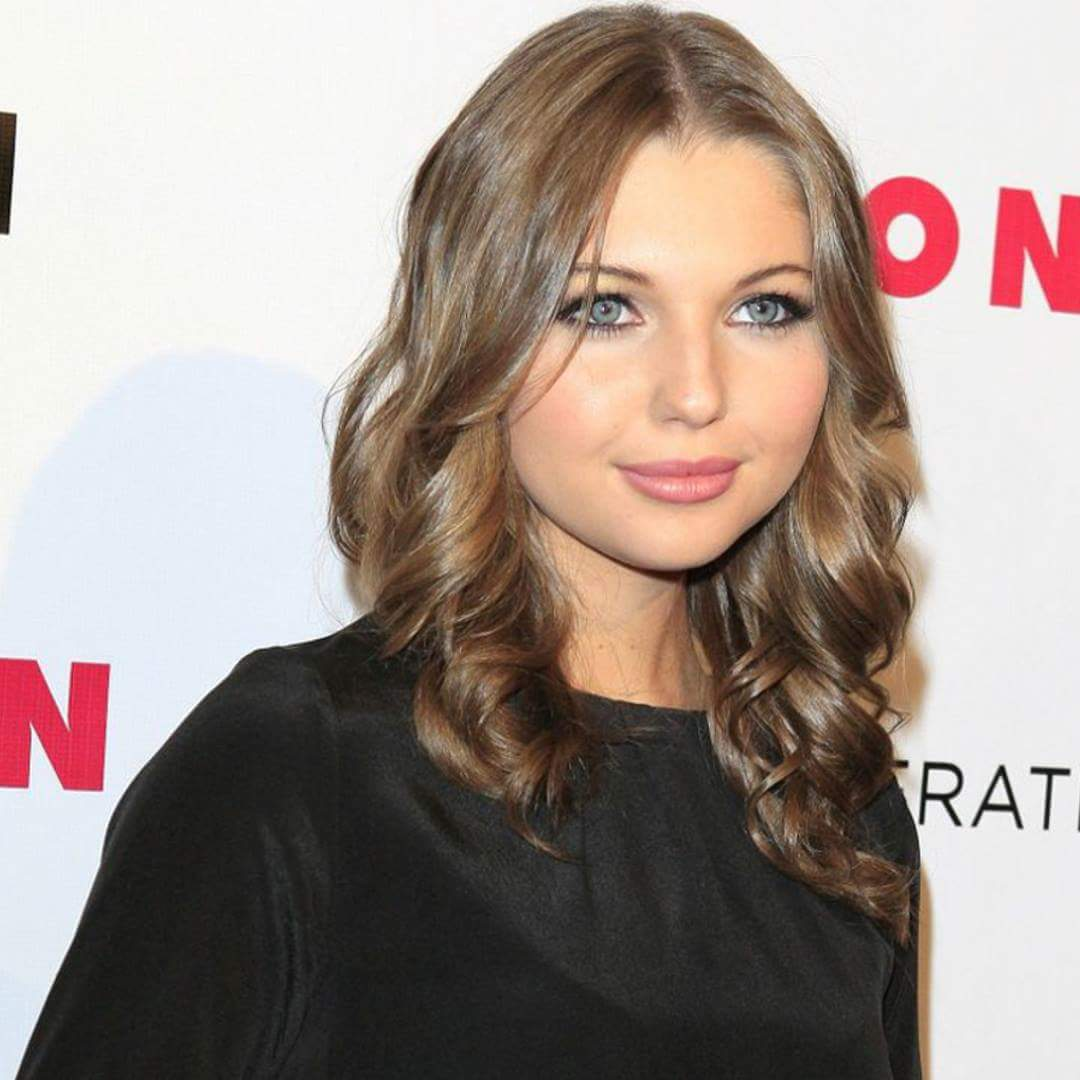
- Hanratty in 2015
- Born: Samantha Lynn Hanratty; September 20, 1995 (age 30); Scottsdale, Arizona, U.S.
- Occupation: Actress
- Years active: 1998–present
- Spouse: Christian DeAnda (m. 2023)
- Children: 1

Samantha Lynn Hanratty (born September 20, 1995) is an American actress. Her first lead was in 2009, portraying Chrissa Maxwell in An American Girl: Chrissa Stands Strong. In 2011, she played the role Whitney Brown in the film The Greening of Whitney Brown. Hanratty is considered a Celebrity Friend for the Starlight Children's Foundation. Since 2021, she has played teenage Misty Quigley in the Showtime drama series Yellowjackets.

== Early life ==
Samantha Hanratty was born on September 20, 1995, in Scottsdale, Arizona to Ellen (née Sugrue) and Brian Hanratty.

== Acting career ==
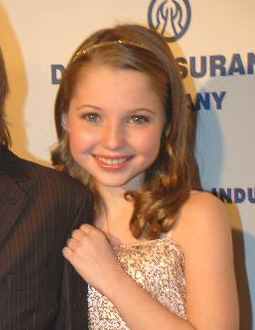
Hanratty in 2007 at the 12th Annual Satellite Awards

Hanratty has appeared in several films and television series including the 2006 ABC Family original film Hello Sister, Goodbye Life, opposite Lacey Chabert. In 2006, she was a recurring character through seasons two and three of The Suite Life of Zack & Cody as Holly, a little girl whose father is a con man and once stayed at the Tipton. The same year, she appeared in the ABC film Stephen King's Desperation. From 2006 to 2009, Hanratty had a recurring role on the action-drama series The Unit with her older sister Danielle. In 2006, she appeared in the film The Santa Clause 3: The Escape Clause, playing an elf named Glenda. She also played Chrissa in the 2009 film An American Girl: Chrissa Stands Strong. Hanratty played a young version of Leelee Sobieski's character Jody Balaban in the romantic comedy film Finding Bliss, directed by Julie Davis. She played the supporting role of Gretel in the fantasy adventure comedy film Jack and the Beanstalk.

Hanratty starred alongside Brooke Shields, Aidan Quinn and Kris Kristofferson in the adventure film The Greening of Whitney Brown, released on November 11, 2011. She co-starred with Billy Unger in the adventure fantasy film The Lost Medallion: The Adventures of Billy Stone, released on March 1, 2013. She appeared in the comedy film Moms' Night Out, released on May 9, 2014, as Zoe. Hanratty appeared in the third season of the action-thriller television series Chosen and also had a recurring role in the supernatural horror series Salem.

In 2015, Hanratty was cast in the Lifetime movie by Shawn Ku titled Seeds of Yesterday, based on the 1984 novel of the same name by V. C. Andrews. In 2017, Hanratty starred in the action comedy movie Bad Kids of Crestview Academy, released on January 13, 2017, as Siouxsie Hess. She appeared on the eighth season of CW supernatural teen drama series The Vampire Diaries in three episodes and also had a recurring role in Showtime's television series Shameless as Kassidi.

Hanratty was part of the ensemble cast of Showtime's thriller series Yellowjackets, portraying a teen version of Christina Ricci's character Misty Quigley.

== Personal life ==
In November 2023, Hanratty married Christian DeAnda in California. On August 27, 2024, Hanratty announced that she and DeAnda were expecting a child. On September 26, 2024, she stated that their son would be born with a cleft lip and require several surgeries after his birth. Hanratty gave birth on December 31, 2024.

She is bisexual.

== Filmography ==
=== Film ===
Year	Title	Role	Notes
2006	Pirates of the Caribbean: Dead Man's Chest	British girl	Uncredited
2006	The Santa Clause 3: The Escape Clause	Elf #1	
2007	Boogeyman 2	Young Laura	
2008	Hero Wanted	Marley Singer	
2009	An American Girl: Chrissa Stands Strong	Chrissa Maxwell	Direct-to-video film
2009	Finding Bliss	Young Jody Balaban	
2009	Within	Michelle Lowe	
2009	A Christmas Carol	Beggar Boy / Young Cratchit Girl / Want Girl	Voice
2009	Jack and the Beanstalk	Gretel	
2010	Magic	Kayla Fairmont	
2010	Kalamity	Barbie Klepack	
2011	The Greening of Whitney Brown	Whitney Brown	
2012	Amazing Love	Carrie	
2013	The Lost Medallion: The Adventures of Billy Stone	Allie	
2013	Second Chances	Abby	
2014	Moms' Night Out	Zoe	
2017	Bad Kids of Crestview Academy	Siouxsie	
2017	The Saint	Zoo Valecross	Direct-to-video film
2019	Countdown	Vlogger	
2019	Skin in the Game	Dani	
2021	Another Girl	Elle Overton	
2024	Atlas	Communications Officer	
TBD	Generation Angst	Vivian	Pre-production
TBD	Method	Faye	Short film; Pre-production

=== Television ===
Year	Title	Role	Notes
2005	Passions	Adele	Season 6, episode 136
2005	Charmed	Wendy	Episode: "Little Box of Horrors"
2005	Drake & Josh	Young Girl at Baseball Game	Episode: "Foam Finger"
2005	House	Dory	Episode: "The Mistake"
2005	Last Laugh '05	Little Girl	Television special
2006	CSI: NY	Emma Matthews	Episode: "Fare Game"
2006	Hello Sister, Goodbye Life	Celia	Television film
2006	MADtv	Various	3 episodes
2006–2009	The Unit	Jen Gerhardt	Recurring role, 10 episodes
2006	Cold Case	Muriel Bartleby (1929)	Episode: "Beautiful Little Fool"
2006	Stephen King's Desperation	Pie Carver	Television film
2006–2007	The Suite Life of Zack & Cody	Holly	Recurring role (seasons 2–3), 6 episodes
2006	That's So Raven	Taylor	Episode: "Rae of Sunshine"
2007–2008	Pushing Daisies	Young Charlotte "Chuck" Charles	Recurring role, 5 episodes
2008	iCarly	Morgan	Episode: "iCarly Saves TV"
2013	Monday Mornings	Abra Rivers	Episode: "Forks Over Knives"
2013	Shake It Up	Kristin Wibler	Episode: "In the Bag It Up"
2013	Mad Men	Millicent	Episode: "The Quality of Mercy"
2013	Rizzoli & Isles	Chloe	Episode: "All for One"
2013	The Christmas Spirit	Morgan	Television film
2014	Zoe Gone	Jennifer Lynne	Television film
2014	Chosen	Megan Acosta	Recurring role (season 3), 6 episodes
2014–2015	Salem	Dollie Trask	Recurring role (seasons 1–2), 12 episodes
2014	Perception	Kayla Madden	Episode: "Painless"
2014	Stalker	Hannah McCoy	Episode: "Whatever Happened to Baby James?"
2015	2 Broke Girls	Kemberly	Episode: "And the Knock Off Knockout"
2015	Seeds of Yesterday	Cindy Sheffield	Television film
2015	How to Get Away with Murder	Zoe Mitchell	Episode: "Skanks Get Shanked"
2016	Inconceivable	Carissa	Television film; also known as Deadly Ex
2017	The Vampire Diaries	Violet Fell	3 episodes
2017–2018	Shameless	Kassidi Gallagher	Recurring role, 7 episodes
2018	The Middle of X	Young Emily	Television film
2018	NCIS	Mother of infant	Episode: "What Child is This"
2019	Daybreak	Aria Killigan	Episode: "5318008"
2019	Grand Hotel	Emily	Episode: "Where the Sun Don't Shine"
2021–present	Yellowjackets	Teen Misty Quigley	Main role
2024	Brilliant Minds	Bridget	Episode: "The Blackout Bride"

== Awards and nominations ==
Year	Award	Category	Work	Result
2007	Young Artist Award	Best Performance in a TV Movie, Miniseries or Special – Young Actress	Hello Sister, Goodbye Life	Nominated
2007	Young Artist Award	Best Performance in a TV Series – Guest Starring Young Actress	The Suite Life of Zack & Cody	Nominated
2008	Young Artist Award	Best Performance in a TV Series – Recurring Young Actress	The Suite Life of Zack & Cody	Nominated
2018	Philadelphia Independent Film Festival	Best Supporting Actor	The Middle of X	Nominated
2022	Pena de Prata	Best Ensemble in a Drama Series	Yellowjackets	Nominated
2022	An Irish Person Award	Outstanding Ensemble in a Drama Series	Yellowjackets	Won
