= Hard Promises (film) =

1992 film by Martin Davidson

- Theatrical release poster
- Directed by: Martin Davidson
- Written by: Jule Selbo
- Produced by: Cynthia Chvatal; William Petersen
- Starring: Sissy Spacek; William Petersen; Brian Kerwin; Mare Winningham; Jeff Perry
- Cinematography: Andrzej Bartkowiak
- Edited by: Kimberly Domínguez; Bonnie Koehler
- Music by: George S. Clinton
- Production companies: High Horse Films; Stone Group Pictures
- Distributed by: Columbia Pictures (United States); Vision International (International)
- Release dates: 14 September 1991 (TIFF); 31 January 1992 (U.S.)
- Running time: 95 minutes
- Country: United States
- Language: English
- Budget: $8 million
- Box office: $306,319 (USA)

Hard Promises is a 1991 American romantic comedy film directed by Martin Davidson. It stars Sissy Spacek and William Petersen.

== Plot ==
Joey Coalter, a man who dislikes stable work environments, has been away for too many years when he finds out that his wife Christine Boykin Coalter had divorced him and is planning to remarry. He comes home to confront her, trying to persuade her not to get married, aided by their daughter Beth, who loves him despite his wandering ways. The couple finds out they still have feelings for each other but must decide how best to handle the contradiction of their lifestyles.

== Cast ==
Actor	Role
Sissy Spacek	Christine Ann Boykin Coalter
William Petersen	Joey Coalter
Brian Kerwin	Walt Humphrey
Mare Winningham	Dawn
Olivia Burnette	Beth Coalter
Peter MacNicol	Stuart Haggerty
Jeff Perry	Pinky
Ann Wedgeworth	Mrs. Boykin
Amy Wright	Shelly
Lois Smith	Mrs. Bell
Margaret Bowman	Mrs. Humphrey

== Production ==
Admiring the directing and acting skill of Lee Grant, Sissy Spacek agreed to take the role "only to work with Grant", although Grant was later replaced as its director.

== Critical reception ==
Vincent Canby of The New York Times did not care for the film but did praise some of the actors:

Hard Promises is a barren little comedy that means to be romantic... For Hard Promises to be half as much fun as it intends to be, Joey should be a thoroughly likable scamp. For reasons that may be due to Jule Selbo's screenplay, Martin Davidson's direction or something in Mr. Petersen's screen personality, Joey is not the dreamboat the movie requires. He's a bore... The movie offers a lot of running gags that walk very slowly, and small roles to a number of very good actors, including Mare Winningham, Peter MacNicol, Lois Smith, Ann Wedgeworth and Amy Wright.

On Rotten Tomatoes, the film had an aggregate score in November 2022 of 40% based on 2 positive and 3 negative critic reviews.
