= Not a Pretty Picture =

1976 film by Martha Coolidge

- Film poster
- Directed by: Martha Coolidge
- Written by: Martha Coolidge
- Produced by: Martha Coolidge
- Starring: Michelle Manenti; Jim Carrington; Anne Mundstuk
- Cinematography: Don Lenzer; Fred Murphy
- Edited by: Suzanne Pettit; Martha Coolidge
- Music by: Tom Griffith
- Production company: Coolidge Productions
- Distributed by: Films Inc.
- Release date: March 31, 1976 (New York City)
- Running time: 83 minutes
- Country: United States
- Language: English

Not a Pretty Picture is a 1976 American docudrama film. The film was written, produced and directed by Martha Coolidge, marking her narrative feature film directorial debut, after years of working as a documentary filmmaker in the early to mid-1970s. The film recreates Coolidge's experience of being raped by an acquaintance when she was sixteen years old in 1962, then focuses on the aftermath.

The film first premiered in March 31, 1976 in New York City. It went on to screen at the 1976 Toronto International Film Festival, 1978 Sundance Film Festival (then known as Utah/US Film Festival) and in arthouse theaters. In 2022, the film was restored by the Academy Film Archive and The Film Foundation and was given a limited theatrical release.

== Plot ==
The first part of the film shows a teenage Martha, played by an actor, hanging out with a group of friends and flirting with boys in a car. She then goes back to an apartment with the boys. Coolidge herself periodically breaks the fourth wall to question the actors about their approaches. She also interviews people she was close with at the time to get their recollections of how she acted.

Teenage Martha and her date, Curly, are in a room of the building where the floor is lined with mattresses. Two of their friends are off kissing in another room, while another is drunkenly stumbling around. Curly leads Martha through a hole in the wall to another space, where the assault unfolds. Coolidge the director is shown filming the scene. The camera abruptly cuts to the actors speaking with Coolidge about their choices in staging and acting out the scene. Coolidge and the actor that plays teen Martha share personal stories about rape. The actor playing Curly examines his own participation in a culture that objectifies women, recounting how he used to go to a local college to pick up "pigs," promiscuous girls he could sleep with.

The aftermath of the assault involves teenage Martha opening up to and bonding with her roommate Anne, who is played by Coolidge's real-life former roommate Anne Mundstuk. Anne tries to offer a safe space for teen Martha's trauma.

== Cast ==
- Michele Manenti as Martha at 16
- Jim Carrington as Curly
- Anne Mundstuk as herself
- Reed Birney as Fred
- John Fedinatz as West Virginia
- Diana Gold as Jane
- Stephen Laurier as Brian
- Lillah McCarthy as Nancy
- Janet Morrison as Bunny
- Melissa Murdock as Leah
- Hal Studer as Cullen
- Amy Wright as Cindy

== Legacy ==
Director Francis Ford Coppola was impressed by the film and invited Coolidge to work with his production company American Zoetrope, which eventually led to Coolidge directing her studio feature film, Valley Girl.

The film screened in 16mm at the New York's Anthology Film Archives in 2018. Writing about the film for The Village Voice, filmmaker April Wolfe said, "What’s most unnerving about this four-decade-old film is how little has changed in the time since. We are still learning the same lessons Coolidge was trying to impart so long ago — nothing is different." She noted, "In other movies from the Seventies and Eighties, women were employing similar hybrid forms as a means to share their marginalized experiences with a certain amount of distance for the sake of their psyches. Michelle Citron's Daughter Rite (1980), Kay Armatage's Striptease (1980), and Marilú Mallet's Unfinished Diary (1982) all fall into this category." The film has been described as an influence on Jennifer Fox's 2018 film The Tale. In 2020, Richard Brody of The New Yorker included Not a Pretty Picture in his list of the Sixty-Two Best Documentaries of All Time.

In 2022, The Academy Film Archive in partnership with Martin Scorsese's Film Foundation restored Not a Pretty Picture, with funding provided by the George Lucas Family Foundation. The restoration premiered on December 8, 2022, at the Academy Museum in Hollywood. In 2023, Not a Pretty Picture screened at Berlinale, selected by Céline Sciamma.

In August 2024, the film was released on Blu-ray and DVD by the Criterion Collection.
