= Jonathan Firth =

English actor (born 1967)

- Born: Jonathan Stephen Firth; 6 April 1967 (age 59); Brentwood, Essex, England
- Education: Royal Central School of Speech and Drama
- Occupation: Actor
- Years active: 1990–present
- Relatives: Colin Firth (brother); Kate Firth (sister)
- Awards: 2004 CFT Excellence Award for Best Actor in a Motion Picture, Luther

Jonathan Stephen Firth (born 6 April 1967) is an English actor. He is best known for his roles in such British television productions as Middlemarch, Far from the Madding Crowd, and Victoria & Albert.

== Early life ==
Jonathan Firth was born in Brentwood, Essex, England, to David Norman Lewis and Shirley Jean (née Rolles) Firth. His parents were both children of Methodist missionaries in India, who worked as teachers in Nigeria after their marriage. He is the younger brother of actor Colin Firth and voice coach Kate Firth. The family moved many times, from Billericay to Brentwood, Essex, and then to St. Louis, Missouri (USA) for a year when Jonathan was five.

Upon returning to England the family settled in Winchester, Hampshire, where his father became a history lecturer at King Alfred's College and his mother was a comparative religion lecturer at King Alfred's College, Winchester (now the University of Winchester).

Firth studied at Central School of Speech and Drama and Peter Symonds College in Winchester. His flatmate at one time was actor Rufus Sewell.

After graduation, he toured with the Royal Shakespeare Company, where he made his debut at the age of twenty-seven as Henry VI (1994).

== Acting career ==
In addition to his roles in the theatre, Firth has acted in cinematic films and radio dramas, narrated audiobooks, and has also made notable television appearances, such as Linton Heathcliff in Emily Brontë's Wuthering Heights (1992); Fred Vincy in Middlemarch (1994); Lord Byron in Highlander: The Series (1997); Sergeant Troy in Far from the Madding Crowd, for which he received a nomination for best actor; Lord Arthur Goring in An Ideal Husband (2000); and Prince Albert in Victoria & Albert (2001). He portrayed Joshua in the 2000 biblical film, In the Beginning.

In 2003, he acted in the BBC's dramatised documentary Pompeii: The Last Day. That same year, Firth appeared in the film Luther, portraying Cardinal Aleander, the papal adviser who sought Luther's excommunication. For his performance, he received the CFT Excellence Award for Best Actor in a Motion Picture.

He has also guest-starred in Van der Valk (1991), Inspector Morse (1992); Covington Cross (1992); Cadfael (1994); Agatha Christie's Poirot: Hickory Dickory Dock (1995); Tales from the Crypt (1996); Midsomer Murders The Killings at Badger's Drift (1997); Kangaroo Palace (1998), an Australian drama set in the 1960s; The Magical Legend of the Leprechauns (1999); The Inspector Lynley Mysteries (2002); Sparkling Cyanide (2003); and Jericho (2005). He appeared in The Prince and Me 2: The Royal Wedding (2006), The Prince and Me 3: A Royal Honeymoon (2008) and The Prince and Me 4: The Elephant Adventure (2010).

In 2008, Firth starred as the chef in a short film, The Chef's Letter, played Evan in the radio production of Dame Daphne du Maurier's September Tide, and was also featured in an episode of the American television series Ghost Whisperer. In 2009, he portrayed Dr. David Fuller in the German film Albert Schweitzer.

In 2016, he appeared as Rex Bishop in the BBC series Father Brown episode 4.1 "The Mask of the Demon".

== Personal life ==
Firth lives in Islington, North London.

== Theatre ==
- Eden End (Farrant), Royal Theatre, June 2011
- Henry VI, Part III (Henry), Royal Shakespeare Company
- The Lulu Plays (Schwartz), Almeida Theatre, London
- Bad Company (Ian), National Theatre Studio
- Witness for the Prosecution (Sir Wilfred Robarts QC), County Hall, London

== Audio books ==
- War and Peace by Leo Tolstoy. Narrator, BBC Audiobooks, 1997
- Julius Caesar by William Shakespeare. Narrator, BBC Radio Collection, 1999
- Shadows of Glory by William Woodruff. Narrator, 2003
- Twelfth Night by William Shakespeare. Narrator, BBC Audiobooks, 2005
- The Two Noble Kinsmen: Arkangel Complete Shakespeare. Narrator, BBC Audiobooks, 2003
- Measure for Measure by William Shakespeare. Narrator, 2006
- Nobody True by James Herbert. Narrator, 2007
- Sepulchre by James Herbert. Narrator, 2008
- I'll Never Be Young Again by Daphne Du Maurier. Narrator
- In Search for Lost Time by Marcel Proust. Narrator, BBC Audiobooks, 2009
- Short Stories: The Thinking Man's Collection. Narrator, 2010
- Heathrow Nights by Jan Mark. Narrator, 2011
