= Scarecrows (1988 film) =

1988 film by William Wesley

- Theatrical release poster
- Directed by: William Wesley
- Written by: William Wesley; Richard Jefferies
- Story by: William Wesley
- Produced by: Ted Vernon; William Wesley; Cami Winikoff
- Starring: Ted Vernon; Michael David Simms; Richard Vidan
- Cinematography: Peter Deming
- Edited by: William Wesley
- Music by: Terry Plumeri
- Production company: Effigy Films
- Distributed by: Manson International Pictures
- Release date: September 28, 1988
- Running time: 83 minutes
- Country: United States
- Language: English
- Budget: $425,000
- Box office: $3 million (home video)

Scarecrows is a 1988 American slasher film written, produced and directed by William Wesley. Its plot follows a group of mercenaries who hijacked a plane in California, and after making an emergency landing in a cornfield, find themselves stalked by murderous scarecrows possessed by spirits.

Independently financed, Scarecrows was filmed in 1985 in Davie, Florida, and released direct-to-video several years later after its distributor, Manson International Pictures, went bankrupt.

== Plot ==
Five paramilitary mercenaries and war criminals—Corbin, Curry, Jack, Roxanne, and Bert—steal three million dollars from Camp Pendleton and take two hostages: Al, a pilot, his teenaged daughter, Kellie, along with their dog Dax. As they fly toward Mexico, Bert steals the loot and parachutes into a dark field. Corbin and Jack parachute after him.

Upon landing, Bert's parachute gets caught in a tree, and, after untangling himself, finds a scarecrow alongside several graves. In the distance he notices an abandoned farmhouse. Bert flees in a truck parked at the house, driving down a desolate road and retrieving the loot.

As the others attempt to track him from the plane, the truck breaks down. Bert finds the truck mysteriously does not have an engine. He attempts to flee on foot with the trunk full of loot. He finds himself in a grove of scarecrows, and is stabbed to death by one that supernaturally animates itself.

After landing the plane, Curry, Roxanne, and Kellie arrive at the house, and find Corbin and Jack inside. From the roof of the house, Curry spots the loot near three crosses in the distance; the scarecrows that were there have disappeared. Roxanne stays behind at the house with Kellie while Jack, Curry, and Corbin venture into the field to find the loot.

They locate the truck Bert escaped in, and find a scarecrow in the driver's seat. Nearby, they locate Bert's parachute bag hanging from the tree, and upon attempting to open it, find it filled with blood.

Back at the house, the men are confronted by Bert, and Curry begins punching him. In the midst of the fight, they discover Bert's abdomen has been eviscerated, his body stuffed with dollar bills, though he is still seemingly alive. Curry and Roxanne shoot Bert numerous times, but the bullets prove ineffective. Corbin finally decapitates him, apparently killing him. Kellie flees into the field in the melee, and finds her father's eviscerated body hung from a scarecrow post with barbwire. Corbin retrieves her, bringing her back to the house, where Jack and Roxanne are extracting the wadded cash stuffed in Bert's hollowed-out corpse. Corbin tells them Al is dead, and Kellie slaps Roxanne in the face, chastising all of them for her father's death.

Jack notices that more dollar bills have blown into the field near the house, and the group rushes outside to retrieve what money they can. While in a remote part of the field, Jack is killed by one of the scarecrows, which dismembers him with a handsaw before stabbing him in the face. While searching for Jack, Curry finds three scarecrows in the field, but they disappear. Curry becomes convinced that the scarecrows are possessed by the spirits of three deceased Satanist farmers—Jakob, Benjamin, and Norman Fowler—whose photograph hangs inside the farmhouse.

Roxanne, Corbin, and Kellie decide to leave, but Curry stays behind, refusing to depart without Jack. The three become separated in the field, and, while attempting to recoup loose dollar bills on the ground, Roxanne is viciously killed by one of the scarecrows. Corbin shoots a scarecrow that nearly attacks Kellie, and the two flee to the plane. Corbin is stabbed in the leg while attempting to crawl beneath a fence, but Kellie shoots two of the scarecrows before they can kill Corbin.

Back at the house, Curry finds Bert's severed head and limbs have reanimated, and is subsequently confronted by a grossly disfigured Jack, who stabs him to death.

Kellie flies the plane out of the field with Corbin and her dog Dax. Once in the air, Corbin is stabbed by a repossessed Al, who covertly boarded the plane. The repossessed Al goes after Kellie and stabs her through the wrist. Corbin has managed to get back, and the two begin to fight, and Corbin explodes a grenade, killing them both. Voice-over narration from a morning news broadcast imparts that the plane was found landed near San Diego, with the charred remains of two individuals being feasted on by Kellie's dog, who then tries to attack the SWAT team and had to be tranquilized. Meanwhile, Kellie was found, still in the cockpit, in a shocked state.

== Cast ==
- Ted Vernon as Corbin
- Michael David Simms as Curry
- Richard Vidan as Jack
- Kristina Sanborn as Roxanne
- Victoria Christian as Kellie
- David James Campbell as Al
- B. J. Turner as Bert
- Tony Santory as Jakob Fowler
- Phil Zenderland as Norman Fowler
- Mike Balog as Benjamin Fowler
- Don Herbert as Radio Newscaster (voice)

== Production ==
=== Screenplay ===
William Wesley and Richard Jefferies co-wrote the screenplay for the film, with each writing drafts and then passing them between each other, making edits and alterations. The film marked Wesley's first feature, as well as producer Cami Winikoff. Wesley devised the story of three farmers who have died, and now act as sentinels of the field and farmhouse.

=== Casting ===
According to Wesley, he attempted to cast the film with local actors, but was unsuccessful; the majority of the casting process was completed in Los Angeles. Ted Vernon was the sole performer who was a local in Florida, and he was given his role in return for having financed $150,000 of the budget. Wesley stated in a 2015 interview that Vernon was unhappy with his lack of lines, which Wesley had mandated as Vernon was an inexperienced actor, and that this caused friction between them.

=== Filming ===
Filming took place over a period of 24 days in Davie, Florida in 1984. Though the bulk of principal photography took place in Florida, the exterior scenes featuring the airplane landing and taking off were shot in Mexico six weeks after filming ended. The farmhouse where the majority of the action takes place was a real derelict farmhouse on the edge of a swamp; Winikoff stated that the house proved challenging for the production team, as it was falling apart. The house was rented for three months at a rate of $250 a month, and the first month and a half was dedicated to pre-production.

Throughout the shoot, the cast and crew were plagued by mosquitos. During filming, the production ran out of funds, and further financing had to be arranged to finish the film.

Cinematography was by Peter Deming, who would go on to work on Hellraiser and Evil Dead II. A total $5,000 was allotted for the special effects in the film.

=== Post-production ===
Wesley and producer Winikoff were scheduled to fly from Miami to Los Angeles to edit the film, and had tickets for Delta Air Lines Flight 191, on August 2, 1985; however, they inadvertently drove to the wrong airport, thus missing the flight, which entered a microburst in Dallas and crashed, killing 136 passengers.

== Release ==
After the film was completed, it was sold to Manson International Pictures. However, seven months after the transactions, the company went bankrupt, stalling a chance at theatrical release. According to producer Cami Winikoff, the film was successful in the home video market, and grossed around $3 million.

=== Critical response ===
Time Out gave the film a mostly positive stating in its review for the film, "Although a little slow to get started, this better-than-average horror movie makes excellent use of its creepily-lit monsters, is reasonably well put together, and features some stomach-turning grisliness". Mick Martin and Derrick Bang of the Video Movie Guide awarded it a full four stars, praising it as "a truly frightening horror film, loaded with suspense, intelligent writing, and decent acting."

Steve Barton from Dread Central awarded the film a score of 3.5 / 5 stating, "As fun as it is over-the-top violent, Scarecrows is the perfect fit for viewers looking to strap in for some good old fashioned mindless mayhem". Terror Trap.com awarded the film 3/4 stars, commending its "claustrophobic atmosphere", slow pacing, special effects, and "allegorical plotwork". HorrorNews.net praised the film, writing, "Scarecrows is easily noted as one of the more scary releases to come out of the 80's. It proves to be suspenseful and inventive in its use of effects and shadow-lit attacks. Fans of the genre will get the best experience watching it in a dimly lit room to better effect the atmosphere of this movie." Andrew Smith from Popcorn Pictures gave the film 8/10 stars, writing, "Scarecrows nails the eeriness down to a tee and never once lets up in its attempts to get under your skin. You may not like it due to the limited characters and the lack of any real structured story but once you're transported into this cornfield, you'll never be able to forget about it. A true hidden gem of horror."

Ian Jane from DVD Talk gave the film a mixed review saying, "While the movie looks and sounds okay and is presented here in its uncut form, it hasn't aged all that well and the barebones presentation doesn't help anything. Scarecrows has got some solid gore and will definitely provide children of the 80s with a fun sense of nostalgia, but it's not a great film". TV Guide awarded the film 2/5 stars, writing, "The sense of foreboding is surprisingly high, though the performances are two-dimensional at best."

=== Home media ===
Scarecrows was released on VHS by M.C.E.G./Virgin Visi on September 28, 1988. The film was later released on DVD on February 19, 2007, by Jeff Films. On September 11, that same year it was released by MGM and 20th Century Fox. It was released on September 8, the following year by Video International. In 2011, MGM re-released the film on April 5 as a part of two separate multi-disk video collections. On September 13, later that year, the company released a "Checkpoint" version of the film. On September 4, 2012, it was released by Mill Creek Entertainment, as a part of a 12-disc "The Excellent Eighties" Collection.

The film was released for the first time on Blu-ray by Scream Factory on June 2, 2015. The film was released on Blu-ray in Australia by Import Vendor on February 26, 2016. On October 14, 2019, Scream Factory announced that their Blu-ray release of the film was officially out of print.

== Sources ==
- Albright, Brian (2012). Regional Horror Films, 1958-1990: A State-by-State Guide with Interviews. Jefferson, North Carolina: McFarland. ISBN 978-0-7864-7227-7.
- Galluzzo, Rob; Wesley, William; Winikoff, Cami (2015). Scarecrows (Blu-ray audio commentary). Shout! Factory.
- Martin, Mick; Bang, Derrick (1994). Video Movie Guide 1995. New York City, New York: Random House. ISBN 978-0-345-39027-1.
