= Kate Firth =

English actress and vocal coach

- Born: 1962 (age 63–64); Nigeria
- Years active: Actress, voice coach
- Relatives: Colin Firth (brother); Jonathan Firth (brother)
- Website: katefirth.co.uk

Kate Firth (born 1962) is a British professional voice coach and stage actress, and sister to actors Colin and Jonathan Firth. She has a therapeutic counsellor background in the field of human communication, and extensive experience in theatre, psychology and applied linguistics.

She was born in Nigeria in 1962. Her parents, Shirley Jean (née Rolles) and David Norman Lewis Firth, were both children of Methodist missionaries in India, and after their marriage worked as teachers in Nigeria and other cities. The family moved many times, from Essex to Billericay and Brentwood, and then to St. Louis, Missouri (USA) for a year when Kate was ten years old and her brother Colin was twelve. Upon returning to England the family settled in Winchester, where her father became a history lecturer at King Alfred's College and her mother was a comparative religion lecturer at King Alfred's College Winchester (now the University of Winchester).

She attended Queen Mary College (1982–85), San Diego State University (1990–92), and Middlesex University (2011). She initially pursued a career in acting, studying drama at university. After an acting stint with the Royal National Theatre, she received a postgraduate diploma in Voice Studies from The Central School of Speech and Drama and a postgraduate certificate in Psychosynthesis Therapeutic Counselling. She married after university and moved to California.

Upon returning to England in 1992, Firth joined the Bridge Theatre Company in Sherringham. She lives and works in London.

For The King's Speech (2010), she coached her older brother Colin to prepare for his role as King George VI in the film and to master stammering.

== Theatre credits ==
- Three Days of Rain (Donmar)
- Taming of the Shrew (Bristol Old Vic)
- Lula in Dutchman (Experimental Theatre)
- Hedda Gabler (Bridge Theatre Company, 1992)
- The Merchant of Venice (New End, 1993)
