= Ill Behaviour (TV series) =

- Genre: Black comedy
- Written by: Sam Bain
- Directed by: Steve Bendelack
- Starring: Chris Geere; Tom Riley; Jessica Regan; Lizzy Caplan; Christina Chong
- Country of origin: United Kingdom
- Original language: English
- No. of seasons: 1
- No. of episodes: 3

Production
- Executive producers: Iain Morris; Damon Beesley

Original release
- Network: BBC iPlayer, BBC2
- Release: July 2017

Ill Behaviour is a British comedy-drama television series first broadcast in 2017.

== Plot ==
Charlie has been diagnosed with a readily treated cancer, Hodgkin lymphoma, but decides to try alternative therapies such as coffee enemas and homeopathy.

His friends, Tess and recently divorced Joel, lock him in a cellar and inject him with chemotherapy drugs against his will. They are helped by a deregistered American doctor, Nadia. Tess and Joel take desperate measures to cover up their scheme, prevent Charlie escaping, and mislead his wife, Kira.

== Production and cast ==
The series was commissioned by BBC3, written by Sam Bain, directed by Steve Bendelack, and produced by Fudge Park Productions.

=== Main cast ===
- Chris Geere as Joel
- Tom Riley as Charlie
- Jessica Regan as Tess
- Lizzy Caplan as Nadia
- Christina Chong as Kira

== Broadcast ==
Ill Behaviour was first broadcast on BBC2 on 20 August 2017 following its 22 July release on iPlayer. It aired on Showtime in the US in November 2017. It has been aired both as six separate episodes and as three hour-long episodes.

== Reception ==
Ill Behaviour received mixed reviews from critics, scoring 55 on Metacritic and 67 per cent on Rotten Tomatoes as of 2023.
