= The Lost Medallion: The Adventures of Billy Stone =

- Movie poster
- Directed by: Bill Muir
- Written by: Bill Muir
- Produced by: Kevin Downes; Bobby Downes; Phillip Moses; Wych Kaosayananda; Michael Scott; Mark Burman; Jamie Muir
- Starring: Billy Unger; Sammi Hanratty; James Hong; Alex Kendrick; Mark Dacascos; Jansen Panettiere
- Cinematography: Brian Baugh
- Edited by: David de Vos; Phillip Moses; Bill Muir
- Music by: Marc Fantini; Steffan Fantini
- Production company: Kaos Entertainment
- Distributed by: Methinx Entertainment; Freestyle Releasing
- Release date: March 1, 2013
- Running time: 97 minutes
- Country: United States
- Language: English
- Budget: $2.5 million
- Box office: $705,854

The Lost Medallion: The Adventures of Billy Stone is a 2013 American independent adventure fantasy film written and directed by Bill Muir. It was later released as a children's book by Muir and Alex Kendrick. The story revolves around Billy Stone (Billy Unger) and Allie (Sammi Hanratty) as amateur archaeologists who find a long lost medallion belonging to an ancient tribal king.

== Plot ==
The film begins as Daniel Anderson (Alex Kendrick) arrives at a foster home, bringing donations. He is asked to tell a story to the children. He accepts and the film transitions into the Lost Medallion universe.

The story begins in a flashback in which a man holding an item wrapped in cloth is running away from another man. The man digs a hole by a tree and buries a medallion. The film flashes back to the present where Billy (Billy Unger) sneaks into his father's archaeological site and tries to help work. He is told to leave, so he goes swimming with his best friend Allie (Sammi Hanratty). When he goes back home, she gives him an old book. Billy is not a reader, so they read it together. They hear how the medallion was buried in a different spot than where his dad is looking. They go into the forest with Billy's home-made metal detector go searching. Two men from a rival archeology company have been watching them and bring their own metal detectors. The kids stumble on the goons and head off in a different direction. They hide behind a large tree. The detector goes off and they dig up the medallion.

The goons discover them and chase them through the city. After a bit, the kids, thinking they have lost the men, head back to Billy's home, only to find that the goons have arrived before them and tied up Billy's dad. Billy yells "I wish this whole mess had never happened!" and the medallion sends both Billy and Allie back in time (200 years).

The pair are captured and taken to a nearby village, where the village king (Jansen Panettiere), Huko, notices the medallion and claims that it is his. However, the people say that the king of the village is whoever wears the medallion; they hold a party for the new royalty. The party is interrupted by the arrival of an enemy force, led by the ancestors of the two goons they had met in the present. Everyone in the village is captured except for Billy, Allie, Huko, and Anui.

Later the group is cornered by a river. Allie is captured, but Billy agrees to exchange her for the medallion. After the exchange, the kids jump over a waterfall to avoid capture. The kids quarrel among themselves but decide to try and seek help from an old wise man, Faleaka (James Hong), in the mountains.

The wise man tells them that they must complete tasks, and in return he will teach them how to defeat Cobra, the enemy that attacked the camp, and the evil warlord who keeps the natives in terror, and get the medallion back. The kids travel to the island of Cobra. On the beach of Cobra's island, Faleaka is shot by an arrow and killed.

The kids continue trying to get Cobra, but are captured; this time they are sent to a prison/work camp, and Billy is locked up in a cell. Billy escapes and meets the others in the camp. They use the tasks they learned from Faleaka to help everyone escape. Billy and Cobra have one last battle, and Cobra, along with the medallion, is pushed into a hellish pit.

The four friends get back together, and Billy and Allie accept that they are stuck in the past permanently, since the medallion is gone forever. However, Billy realizes that since they are in the past, he and Allie do not find the medallion for another 200 years. Thus, the medallion should still be buried. He goes to the place where he and Allie had discovered the medallion, and finds the medallion there, wrapped up. The jewel that belongs in the middle starts glowing, and is put in its rightful place in the medallion. Billy gives the medallion to Huko, who then activates the medallion to send Billy and Allie back to the present. Billy attacks the goons that had captured his father, only to have his father stop him, revealing that time has changed and the goons are no longer evil. The film ends with Daniel expressing the story's message of God's love.

== Cast ==
- Billy Unger as Billy Stone
- Sammi Hanratty as Allie
- James Hong as Faleaka
- Jansen Panettiere as Huko
- Alex Kendrick as Daniel Anderson
- Mark Dacascos as "King Cobra"
- William Corkery as Anui
- Tiya Sircar as Mohea

== Production ==
The film was shot in Bangkok, Kanchanaburi, and Krabi, in Thailand, in 2009, and the foster home scene was filmed in California at a later date.

After the film went through the US/Canada Film Festival circuit, many church-based investors invested in the film. With the investment some changes were made that changed how the film is presented. A new opening and ending was created, with Alex Kendrick added to the cast, so that The Lost Medallion is now a story that Alex's character tells foster kids about God.

The film opened in limited theaters nationwide on March 1, 2013.

== Video game ==
Retora Game Studios developed two mobile app games to accompany the film. The Lost Medallion game is an Angry Birds type game where the user swings Billy's slingshot to fill the hole of the medallion. The game contains 20 levels and stills from the movie. The second is Billy's Adventure where the player has to move across a grid to avoid goons and dig up treasure.
