= Kam Heskin =

American actress

- Born: May 7, 1973 (age 53); Grand Forks, North Dakota, U.S
- Years active: 1996–2010

Kam Heskin (born May 7, 1973) is an American former actress. She began her career playing Caitlin Deschanel on the NBC daytime soap opera Sunset Beach (1998–1999), before appearing in films Planet of the Apes (2001) and Catch Me If You Can (2002). Heskin went on in 2003 to play Elizabeth Bennet in an independent film Pride & Prejudice: A Latter-Day Comedy, Robin in Charmed (2004), and Paige Morgan in The Prince and Me film franchise (2006–2010).

== Early life ==
Heskin was born in Grand Forks, North Dakota. She studied at Concordia College in Minnesota, graduating with a degree in Communications and Political Science.

== Career ==
Heskin' first role came in early 1998, when director John Woo selected her as the lead in his pilot Blackjack starring Dolph Lundgren and Kate Vernon. Later that year, she replaced Vanessa Dorman as Caitlin Deschanel on the NBC daytime soap opera Sunset Beach. Heskin portrayed the role until the end of the show, December 31, 1999. She later guest-starred on The WB shows include 7th Heaven, Angel, and Charmed. Heskin later returned to daytime television, briefly replacing McKenzie Westmore as Sheridan Crane on Passions in 2006 and 2008, while actress was on a leave of absence on two occasions.

In 2000, Heskin played the female lead role in the thriller film Held for Ransom. The movie was released direct-to-video, never gaining a theatrical release in the United States. She later had small parts in Tomcats, Planet of the Apes and Catch Me If You Can, before a leading role in the independent comedy film Pride & Prejudice: A Latter-Day Comedy (2003). In 2005, she had role in the box office bomb comedy Dirty Love starring Jenny McCarthy. The following year, she was cast as Paige Morgan (replacing Julia Stiles) in the romantic comedy film The Prince & Me 2: The Royal Wedding, a sequel to the 2004 film The Prince and Me. She later has starred in The Prince and Me 3: A Royal Honeymoon (2008), and The Prince and Me 4: The Elephant Adventure (2010).

== Filmography ==
=== Film ===
Year	Title	Role	Notes
1996	Henry: Portrait of a Serial Killer, Part II	Liquor Store Girl #2	
1998	Blackjack	Cinder James	Television film
2000	Held for Ransom	Jesse McCormick	
2001	Tomcats	Kimberly	
2001	Planet of the Apes	Friend At Leo's Party	
2002	Catch Me If You Can	Candy	
2003	Vlad	Alexa Meyer	
2003	Pride & Prejudice: A Latter-Day Comedy	Elizabeth Bennet	
2003	This Girl's Life	Jessie	
2004	The Ecology of Love	Laura	Short film
2005	Dirty Love	Carrie Carson	
2006	The Prince & Me 2: The Royal Wedding	Paige Morgan	
2006	When the Nines Roll Over	Veronica	Short film
2008	The Prince & Me: A Royal Honeymoon	Queen Paige Morgan	Direct-to-video
2010	The Prince & Me: The Elephant Adventure	Queen Paige Morgan	Direct-to-video

=== Television ===
Year	Title	Role	Notes
1998–1999	Sunset Beach	Caitlin Deschanel	Series regular
2000	7th Heaven	Girl at Party	Episode: "Losers"
2002	Angel	Lola	Episode: "Spin the Bottle"
2004	Charmed	Robyn	Episode: "Witchstock"
2006, 2008	Passions	Sheridan Crane	46 episodes
2007	Coastal Dreams	April	24 episodes
2007–2008	CSI: NY	Suspect-X	Episodes: "Down the Rabbit Hole" and "DOA for a Day"
