= The Prince & Me: The Elephant Adventure =

- DVD cover
- Directed by: Catherine Cyran
- Screenplay by: Blayne Weaver
- Story by: Boaz Davidson
- Produced by: Frank DeMartini; Tom Waller
- Starring: Kam Heskin; Chris Geere; Jonathan Firth; Selina Lo
- Cinematography: Picha Srisansanee
- Edited by: Irit Raz
- Music by: Andrew Gross
- Production companies: Nu Image; Sobini Films
- Distributed by: First Look Studios
- Release dates: February 15, 2010 (United Kingdom); March 23, 2010 (United States)
- Running time: 93 minutes
- Country: United States
- Language: English

The Prince & Me: The Elephant Adventure (also known as The Prince & Me 4 and renamed The Prince & Me 4: Royal Adventures in Paradise when shown on television) is a 2010 American romantic comedy film directed by Catherine Cyran, which was released direct-to-video. It is a sequel to The Prince & Me 3: A Royal Honeymoon.

== Plot ==
One year after their royal wedding, King Edvard and Queen Paige Morgan of Denmark received an invitation to attend the wedding of Princess Myra of Sangyoon. Upon their arrival, Paige finds Myra is unhappy with her arranged marriage to the brooding and sinister Kah and is secretly in love with a young elephant handler named Alu. When the secret romance between Myra and Alu is revealed, Alu is thrown into jail, and the sacred wedding elephant goes missing in the jungle. To save Princess Myra, Paige and Eddie must find the elephant and free Alu before convincing the king of Sangyoon that true love reigns supreme over all.

== Cast ==
- Kam Heskin as Paige Morgan, Queen of Denmark.
- Chris Geere as Edvard III, King of Denmark.
- Jonathan Firth as Søren.
- Selina Lo as Rayen.
- Ase Wang as Princess Myra.
- David Bueno as Soldier No. 3.
- Prinya Intachai as Kah Rayden.
- Frank DeMartini as Drummer.
- Joe Cummings as Violist.
- Vithaya Pansringarm as King Saryu.
- Leigh Barwell as Nurse.
- David Allen Jones as Guitar Player.
- Amarin Cholvibul as Alu.
- Felix John Fraser as Secret Agent 2.
- John Dang as Singer.
- Charlie Ruedpokanon as Soldier #2.
- Peter Mossman as Secret Service Agent #1.
- Emma Dortsch as Little Girl.
