= The Prince & Me: A Royal Honeymoon =

- DVD cover
- Directed by: Catherine Cyran
- Written by: Blayne Weaver
- Produced by: Les Weldon; Danny Lerner; Elyse Eisenberg
- Starring: Kam Heskin; Chris Geere; Adam Croasdell; Jonathan Firth; Todd Jensen; Joshua Rubin
- Cinematography: Emil Topuzov
- Edited by: Irit Raz
- Music by: Andrew Gross
- Production companies: Nu Image; Sobini Films
- Distributed by: First Look Studios
- Release date: October 28, 2008
- Running time: 92 minutes
- Country: United States
- Language: English Bulgarian

The Prince & Me: A Royal Honeymoon (also known as The Prince & Me 3 and renamed The Prince & Me 3: Holiday Honeymoon when shown on television) is a 2008 American romantic comedy film, directed by Catherine Cyran, which was released direct-to-video. It is a sequel to the 2006 film The Prince & Me 2: The Royal Wedding. Kam Heskin reprises her role as Queen Paige Morgan of Denmark, with Chris Geere replacing Luke Mably as King Edvard of Denmark. This film is followed by the 2010 sequel The Prince & Me: The Elephant Adventure.

== Plot ==
At last, the newly crowned King of Denmark, Edvard and his wife/queen, Dr. Paige Morgan, find time to fly to Belavia for their secret honeymoon. They spend their Christmas holidays at a ski resort, but as they take a tour of Belavia's natural beauty, Eddie and Paige discover that the evil Prime Minister Polonius has given orders to bulldoze the precious forests to drill for oil. Paige and Eddie decide they must do everything they can to save the forest, even if it means putting aside their honeymoon. The couple bumps into Paige's ex-boyfriend, Scott, who is a journalist. Eddie immediately becomes jealous. Even though Eddie suspects Scott cannot be trusted, he and Paige ask Scott for help with the media to try and stop the minister's evil plans. Eddie tries to get an audience with the prince of Belavia, but fails, so he and Paige go to the Holiday Ball. At dinner, they learn that Polonius put the idea into Prince Georgiev that Eddie gave the order to cut down the forest. Luckily, Paige is able to persuade him otherwise into listening. After a dance as a means of apology, the prince and Eddie come to a mutual agreement.

Later, after Scott left the party, it is discovered that he is being controlled by Polonius under paid instruction to spy on the couple. Scott tries to back out, but Polonius threatens to expose his intentions to Paige as well as take away his mother's farm. Oliver discreetly takes steps to ensure the press conference does not go in Eddie and Paige's favor. When all else failed, Oliver spooks the horses into causing a sleigh accident. Eddie jumps out into the snow but is rendered unconscious, therefore allowing Oliver to cancel the press conference. With less than a day left, Eddie is frustrated with how things were turning out and starts to suspect that Scott is involved. Paige chastises Eddie before walking out of their room. Eddie goes to a bar and converses with Oliver about the negative circumstances. He realizes his foolish behavior and goes to apologize only to pass out from drinking. Meanwhile, Scott tries to kiss Paige and says he is sorry he let her go. Disgusted, Paige walks away and goes to find Eddie, only to find him drunk having missed his rescheduled conference with Georgiev. Little did she know that Polonius had photographic evidence of Scott kissing Paige.

Paige tries to tell Eddie about the kiss only to be pulled away to meet with Polonius. He uses the opportunity to publicly humiliate Eddie and Paige unless they agree to go no further with their plans. Eddie admits defeat and tells Paige of Polonius' plans to destroy the monarchy, but she refuses to back down and continues moving forward in saving the forest. They confront Scott on the matter who tries to escape, only for Eddie to give chase via snowmobile. Eddie stops Scott and brings him back to the hotel. Scott admits to everything and discovers that everyone was manipulated by Polonius, Oliver's scheming, Eddie's humiliation and Scott's seduction of Paige.

They head to the press conference only to be confronted by Polonius, he has no intention of letting them pass. This leads to Eddie battling Polonius via a sword fight while Paige and Scott make their way to the conference room. Oliver has instructions to blackmail the couple to the press only to be stopped by Paige and Scott. The press also sees the Prime Minister battling with Eddie who distracts and defeats him. With the press and Georgiev present, Polonius has no choice but to admit defeat and is arrested for treason. The conference goes without a hitch as Eddie convinces the world to leave Belavia as it is for its beauty and people and Scott admits his part in everything. Scott apologizes for everything and agrees to work for a living to protect his farm, with the provision from Eddie to have him financially covered.

Later, Paige and Eddie are finally celebrating their honeymoon where Eddie gives her a stethoscope as a way to support her endeavors to be a doctor. Paige turns down the idea of just being a doctor, believing she can be both a doctor and a queen. They celebrate together with the people in a Belavian folk dance.

== Cast ==
- Kam Heskin as Paige Morgan, Queen of Denmark.
- Chris Geere as Edvard III, King of Denmark. Geere replaces Luke Mably in the role from the previous two films.
- Adam Croasdell as Scott Albertson
- Todd Jensen as Prime Minister John Polonius
- Jonathan Firth as Søren
- Joshua Rubin as Oliver Laertis
- Valentin Ganev as Prince Georgiev
- Kitodar Todorov as Boris
- Shelly Varod as Reporter
- Branco Vukovic as German Reporter
