= Jennie Muskett =

British film and TV composer

Jennie Muskett MBE
- Born: Jennifer Jean Muskett
- Occupation: Composer

Jennifer Jean Muskett MBE is a British Emmy winning and Bafta nominated film and TV composer.

== Biography ==
Jennie Muskett has lived in London, South Africa and LA and has established an international reputation as a composer for film and television, having written scores for Miramax, Paramount, Disney, IMAX, the BBC and many more.

Over the years Muskett has also made her mark in Hollywood as a composer with scores such as her lyrical music for The Prince and Me (2004) directed by Martha Coolidge and her comedy score for Material Girls (2005), starring Hilary Duff and Anjelica Huston.

She has provided high-profile TV scores, most recently for the critically acclaimed BBC film, Miss Austen Regrets (2008) and Compulsion starring Ray Winston. Muskett has also been awarded 2 BAFTA nominations for her scores for the series Spooks, for which she also composed the theme, and more recently, the mini-series The State Within received two Golden Globe nominations.

Muskett trained at the Royal College of Music in London and soon after began a career as a cellist, playing for named UK orchestras. Her composing career began when she was invited to write the music for a natural history documentary which, in turn, spurred further commissions in this genre. She worked for production companies such as National Geographic, Discovery, the BBC and IMAX. Muskett's passion for the environment and her fascination with the natural world inspired a diverse ethnicity in her scores. Inevitably Muskett's documentary work has received praise, winning her 2 Emmy's and 5 Emmy nominations.

Muskett has a studio in LA and another in Highgate, London and divides her time between them, working in both film and TV.

She was appointed Member of the Order of the British Empire (MBE) in the 2023 Birthday Honours for services to music.

== Scores ==
- A Passion for Angling | BBC
- Dir. Hugh Miles
- MATERIAL GIRLS
- Dir. Martha Coolidge | MGM
- THE PRINCE AND ME
- Dir. Martha Coolidge | Paramount
- DANIEL DEFOE’S ROBINSON CRUSOE
- Exec Prod. Harvey Weinstein | Miramax
- B. Monkey
- Dir. Michael Radford | Scala/Miramax
- MR. IN-BETWEEN
- Dir. Paul Sarossy | Phantom Pictures
- BOXED
- Dir. Marion Comer | Fireproof Films
- SURVIVAL ISLAND
- With SIR DAVID ATTENBOROUGH | IMAX
- THE SECRETS OF LIFE ON EARTH
- With SIR DAVID ATTENBOROUGH | IMAX
- MISS AUSTEN REGRETS | BBC FILMS
- Dir. Jeremy Lovering
- COMPULSION | Size 9 productions
- Dir. Sarah Harding
- THE STATE WITHIN Mini-Series
- Dirs. Michael Offer & Daniel Percival | BBC & BBC AMERICA
- Golden Globe nominated for best mini series
- SPOOKS (MI-5) Seasons 1–6
- Dirs. Bharat Nalluri, Justin Chadwick and others| Kudos Productions
- BAFTA NOMINATION for BEST ORIGINAL MUSIC 2003
- BAFTA AWARD for BEST DRAMA SERIES 2003
- BAFTA NOMINATION for BEST ORIGINAL MUSIC 2005
- CD of Spooks score released by Cube Soundtracks 2005
- PENGUINS
- Dir. Mark Fletcher | BBC
- PIZZA WARS
- ABC/DISNEY TV
- SAME AS IT NEVER WAS
- ABC/DISNEY TV
- THE TWELVE DAYS OF CHRISTMAS EVE
- Dir. Martha Coolidge | Granada America
- SECRET KILLERS
- Dir. Paul Atkins | National Geographic
- EMMY NOMINATION for BEST ORIGINAL MUSIC 2003
- SHOCKERS
- DEAD GORGEOUS
- Dir. Sarah Harding | Feasible Films
- TOO GOOD TO BE TRUE
- Dir. Sarah Harding | Granada
- Baka – People of the Rainforest
- Dir. Phil Agland | River Films/Channel 4
- BAFTA AWARD WINNER for BEST DOCUMENTARY
- JEWELS OF THE CARIBBEAN
- National Geographic/NBC
- EMMY AWARD for BEST OUTSTANDING ORIGINAL SCORE
- SPIRITS OF THE FOREST
- DISCOVERY CHANNEL
- EMMY AWARD for BEST OUTSTANDING ORIGINAL SCORE
- PEOPLE OF THE FOREST
- National Geographic
- WINNER OF THE PEABODY AWARD
- SELWYN’S LUCKY DAY Animation 10' Short
- Dir. Andrew Peters | Spotty Dog Films
- GREAT WHITE SHARK
- NBC/NATIONAL GEOGRAPHIC
- EMMY NOMINATED for BEST OUTSTANDING ORIGINAL SCORE
