= Martha Coolidge =

American filmmaker (born 1946)

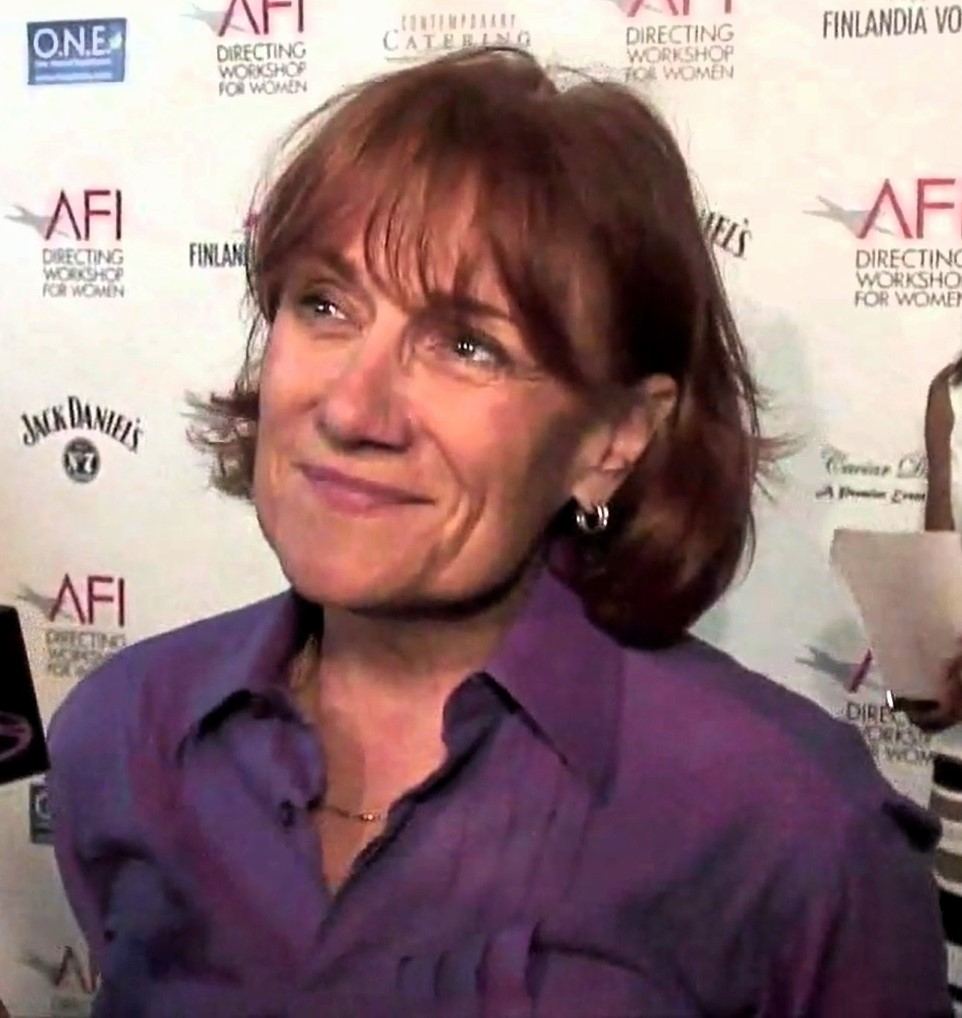
- Coolidge interviewed in 2009
- Born: Martha Patterson Coolidge; August 17, 1946 (age 80); New Haven, Connecticut, U.S.
- Education: Rhode Island School of Design; NYU Tisch School of the Arts (MFA)
- Occupations: Film director; film editor; producer; screenwriter; television director
- Years active: 1972–present
- Spouse(s): Michael Backes (divorced); James Spencer
- Children: 1
- Relatives: Arthur W. Coolidge (grandfather)

Martha Coolidge (born August 17, 1946) is an American film director and former President of the Directors Guild of America. She has directed such films as Valley Girl, Real Genius and Rambling Rose.

== Early life ==
Coolidge was born in New Haven, Connecticut. She is a granddaughter of Arthur W. Coolidge, former lieutenant governor of Massachusetts, who was a fourth cousin of President Calvin Coolidge.

Coolidge studied illustration at Rhode Island School of Design, but changed majors, becoming the first film major at the school. She earned her MFA from New York University's Tisch School of the Arts. Later in Los Angeles, she studied acting and other aspects of her craft with Lee Strasberg, Stella Adler, Joanne Baron, and David Craig.

== Career ==
Coolidge first made her reputation by directing many award-winning documentaries in New York City. While in New York, she helped found the Association of Independent Video and Filmmakers (AIVF).

She moved to Hollywood in 1976 and spent several years as a part of the Zoetrope Studio created by Francis Ford Coppola. Her feature-length directorial debut, Not a Pretty Picture, was based on a date rape she suffered at the age of 16. Her breakthrough came with the independently produced Valley Girl (1983), a film recognized for launching the career of Nicolas Cage. Her film Rambling Rose (1991) won three Independent Spirit Awards for Best Picture, Best Director and Best Supporting Actress for Diane Ladd, in addition to Oscar and Golden Globe nominations for Ladd and Laura Dern (Best Actress). Rambling Rose was well reviewed and made top 10 lists for the year. Despite a limited release hampered by economic problems suffered by the production company, the film played for months and earned many honors.

Introducing Dorothy Dandridge (1999) for HBO was nominated for 11 Emmy Awards, winning five, including Best Actress for its star Halle Berry, and earned Coolidge an Emmy and DGA (Directors Guild of America) nominations for Best Director.

From 2002 to 2003 she was the Directors Guild of America's first female president.

She taught at the Dodge College of Film and Media Arts.

== Personal life ==
Coolidge was previously married to screenwriter Michael Backes, with whom she has a son, Preston, named after director Preston Sturges. She is now married to production designer James Spencer.

== Awards ==
- Independent Spirit Award, Best Director for Rambling Rose
- Independent Spirit Award, Best Feature for Rambling Rose
- DGA Award, Robert B. Aldrich Achievement Award
- Paris Film Festival, Grand Prix Award for Real Genius
- Chicago International Film Festival, Best Short Film for Bimbo
- Chicago International Film Festival, Best Short Film for More Than a School
- LA Femme International Film Festival, Maverick Award
- Method Fest, Forerunner Award
- Women in Film Award, Crystal Award

== Nominations ==
- Online Film & Television Association Award, Best Director for Introducing Dorothy Dandridge
- Emmy Award, Outstanding Directing for a Miniseries, Movie or a Special for Introducing Dorothy Dandridge
- DGA Award, Best Director for An American Girl: Chrissa Stands Strong
- DGA Award, Best Director for If These Walls Could Talk 2
- DGA Award, Best Director for Introducing Dorothy Dandridge
- CableACE Award, Best Director for Crazy in Love
- Chicago Film Critics Association Award, Best Director for Rambling Rose

== Filmography ==
=== Film ===
Year	Title	Director	Writer	Producer	Notes
1976	Not a Pretty Picture	Yes	Yes	Yes	
1983	Valley Girl	Yes	No	No	
1984	City Girl	Yes	Story	Yes	
1984	Joy of Sex	Yes	No	No	
1985	Real Genius	Yes	No	No	
1988	Plain Clothes	Yes	No	No	
1991	Rambling Rose	Yes	No	No	
1993	Lost in Yonkers	Yes	No	No	
1994	Angie	Yes	No	No	
1995	Three Wishes	Yes	No	No	
1997	Out to Sea	Yes	No	No	
2004	The Prince & Me	Yes	No	No	
2006	Material Girls	Yes	No	No	
2019	I'll Find You	Yes	No	No	

=== Television ===
Year	Title	Episodes
1986	Sledge Hammer!	"Under the Gun"
1986	The Twilight Zone	"Night of the Meek"
1986	The Twilight Zone	"Quarantine"
1986	The Twilight Zone	"Shelter Skelter"
2001	Masterpiece	"The Pounder Heart"
2001	Leap Years	"Pilot"
2002	Sex and the City	"A Vogue Idea"
2002	Sex and the City	"I Heart New York"
2003	Hidden Hills	"The Concert"
2005	Huff	"All the Kings Horses"
2006	Related	"Not Without My Daughter"
2006	CSI: Crime Scene Investigation	"Living Legend"
2006	CSI: Crime Scene Investigation	"Redrum"
2006	CSI: Crime Scene Investigation	"Take my life Please"
2006	CSI: Crime Scene Investigation	"Fracked"
2006	CSI: Crime Scene Investigation	"Maid Man"
2007	Shark	"Porn Free"
2007	Weeds	"Shit Highway"
2007	Psych	"Truer Lies"
2013	Cult	"The Good Fight"
2013	The Glades	"Glade-iators!"
2014	Killer Women	"Warrior"
2014	The Night Shift	"Blood Brothers"
2014	Madam Secretary	"Passage"
2016	Angie Tribeca	"The Famous Ventriloquist Did It"
2018	Siren	"Showdown"

=== TV movies ===
Year	Title	Notes
1989	Trenchcoat in Paradise	
1991	Bare Essentials	
1992	Crazy in Love	
1999	Introducing Dorothy Dandridge	
2000	If These Walls Could Talk 2	Segment "1972"
2001	The Flamingo Rising	
2004	12 Days of Christmas Eve	
2009	An American Girl: Chrissa Stands Strong	
2009	Tribute	

== See also ==
- List of female film and television directors
- List of LGBT-related films directed by women
