= Luke Mably =

English actor

Luke Mably is an English actor.

== Career ==
Mably portrayed White in the thriller Exam under the direction of Stuart Hazeldine. He had a lead role in the 2010 supernatural drama television series The Gates. He also played Prince/King Edvard in The Prince & Me.

In 2011, Mably portrayed alcoholic civilian neurosurgeon Dr. Simon Hill on the Global Canadian-British medical drama, Combat Hospital.

== Filmography ==
Year	Title	Role
2001	Uprising	Zachariah Artenstein
2002	28 Days Later	Clifton
2003	4.37	Jay
2004	The Prince & Me	Prince Edvard/Eddie Williams
2005	Spirit Trap	Tom
2005	Colour Me Kubrick	Rupert Rodnight
2006	The Prince & Me 2: The Royal Wedding	King Edvard/Eddie
2006	Deceit	Brian
2007	Save Angel Hope	Henry
2009	Exam	White
2009	Star Crossed	Alex Pierce
2015	Rise of the Footsoldier Part II	Shawn
2016	Chosen	Sonson
2018	Gutterpunks	Nigel Mayne
2020	Break	Terry
2021	The Ghost Writer	Gilliger Graham
2025	Fuze	Lieutenant Colonel Headley

=== Television ===
Year	Title	Role
1999	Holby City	Paul Ripley (3 eps)
1999–2002	Dream Team	Scott Lucas (84 eps)
2000	In the Beginning	Isaac (Younger) (TV-mini series)
2002	EastEnders	Ryan
2007	Kingdom	Mark Larsen
2007	Blue Murder	Dr Fraser McKee
2007	Who Gets the Dog? aka Divorce	Hugo Delaney-Jones (TV movie)
2009	Maggie Hill	Ben Emerson (TV movie)
2010	The Gates	Dylan Radcliff (13 eps)
2011	Combat Hospital	Dr. Simon Hill (13 eps)
2015	NCIS: New Orleans	James Lathom
2019	Seal Team	Sergeant Major Nigel Wickham
2021	Silent Witness	Jed Fletcher
2025	MobLand	DS Ivan Fisk (7 eps)
