= List of awards and nominations received by Renée Zellweger =

Renée Zellweger awards and nominations
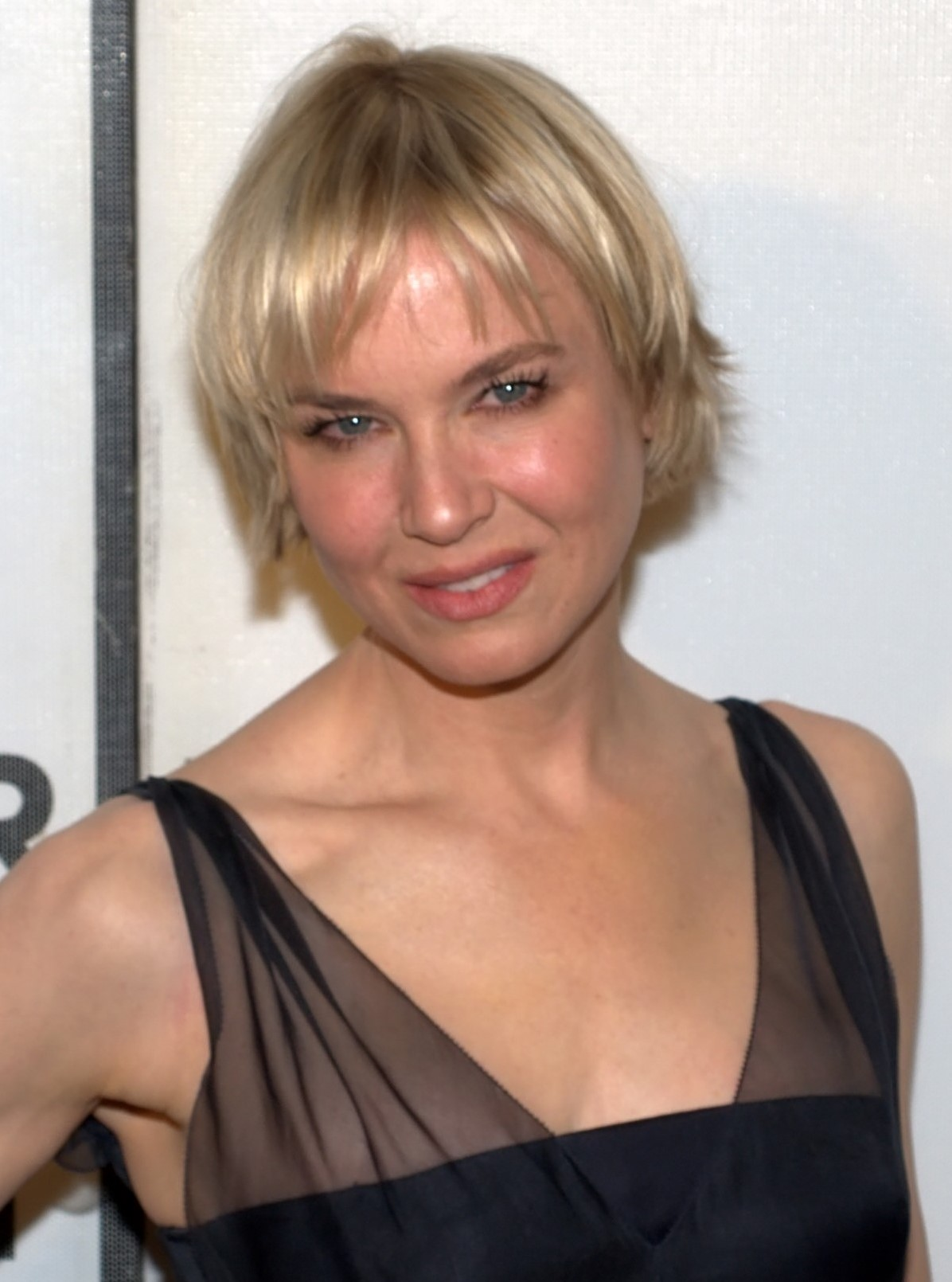
- Zellweger at the 2010 Tribeca Film Festival
Awards and nominations
Award	Wins	Nominations
Academy Awards	2	4
BAFTA Awards	2	4
Emmy Awards	0	1
Golden Globe Awards	4	7
Grammy Awards	0	1
Screen Actors Guild Awards	4	6

Totals (Note: Certain award groups do not simply award one winner. They acknowledge several different recipients, have runners-up, and have third place. Since this is a specific recognition and is different from losing an award, runner-up mentions are considered wins in this award tally. For simplification and to avoid errors, each award in this list has been presumed to have had a prior nomination.)
- Wins: 67
- Nominations: 202

The following is a list of awards and nominations received by American actress Renée Zellweger. She has received two Academy Awards, two British Academy Film Awards, five Critics' Choice Awards, four Golden Globes and four Screen Actors Guild Awards, in addition to a nomination for a Grammy Award and a Primetime Emmy Award.

In 1994, Zellweger gained recognition for her dark comedy romantic crime film Love and a .45, earning a nomination for the Independent Spirit Award for Best Debut Performance. In 1996, she portrayed Novalyne Price in the independent biographical film The Whole Wide World and a lovestruck single mother in the biographical sports film Jerry Maguire, receiving respective nominations for the Independent Spirit Award for Best Female Lead and Screen Actors Guild Award for Outstanding Performance by a Female Actor in a Supporting Role. She also won her first Critics' Choice Movie Award and National Board of Review Award for her performance in the latter.

Zellweger has received seven Golden Globe nominations, with her first five coming consecutively between 2000 and 2004. Her titular leading roles in the comedy films Nurse Betty (2000) and Bridget Jones's Diary (2001) as well as her portrayal of Roxie Hart in the period musical crime film Chicago (2002) earned her three consecutive nominations for Best Actress in a Motion Picture – Musical or Comedy, winning for the first and last of these. Her performance in the period war drama Cold Mountain (2003) earned her a nomination for Best Supporting Actress – Motion Picture, which she won. She reprised her portrayal of Bridget Jones in the sequel Bridget Jones: The Edge of Reason (2004), which earned her a fourth nomination for Best Actress in a Motion Picture – Musical or Comedy. She was nominated again in the category for titular leading role in the biographical drama Miss Potter (2006) and was later nominated in Best Actress in a Motion Picture – Drama for her portrayal of Judy Garland in the biographical drama Judy (2019), which she won. She is one of the few actors to win in all three film acting categories at the Golden Globes.

Zellweger has received four nominations at the Academy Awards. She was nominated twice consecutively in Best Actress for Bridget Jones's Diary (2001) and Chicago (2002), the latter of which won her the Screen Actors Guild Awards for Outstanding Performance by a Female Actor in a Leading Role and Outstanding Performance by a Cast in a Motion Picture and Critics' Choice Movie Award for Best Acting Ensemble. She won Best Supporting Actress and Best Actress for her performances in Cold Mountain (2003) and Judy (2019), which also earned her the respective BAFTA, Critics' Choice, Golden Globe and Screen Actors Guild Awards, with the latter also winning her the Independent Spirit Award and National Board of Review Award.

Zellweger also earned nominations for the Grammy Award for Best Traditional Pop Vocal Album for the soundtrack of Judy and Primetime Emmy Award for Outstanding Television Movie for producing the fourth Bridget Jones film, Mad About the Boy (2025). The latter also garnered her nominations for both the Critics' Choice Television Award for Best Actress in a Movie/Miniseries and Best Movie Made for Television, winning the latter.

== Major associations ==
=== Academy Awards ===
Year	Nominated work	Category	Result	Ref.
2002	Bridget Jones's Diary	Best Actress	Nominated	
2003	Chicago	Best Actress	Nominated	
2004	Cold Mountain	Best Supporting Actress	Won	
2020	Judy	Best Actress	Won	

=== British Academy Film Awards ===
Year	Nominated work	Category	Result	Ref.
2002	Bridget Jones's Diary	Best Actress in a Leading Role	Nominated	
2003	Chicago	Best Actress in a Leading Role	Nominated	
2004	Cold Mountain	Best Actress in a Supporting Role	Won	
2020	Judy	Best Actress in a Leading Role	Won	

=== Emmy Awards ===
Primetime Creative Arts Emmy Awards
Year	Nominated work	Category	Result	Ref.
2025	Bridget Jones: Mad About the Boy	Outstanding Television Movie (Note: As executive producer.)	Nominated	

=== Golden Globe Awards ===
Year	Nominated work	Category	Result	Ref.
2001	Nurse Betty	Best Actress in a Motion Picture – Musical or Comedy	Won	
2002	Bridget Jones's Diary	Best Actress in a Motion Picture – Musical or Comedy	Nominated	
2003	Chicago	Best Actress in a Motion Picture – Musical or Comedy	Won	
2004	Cold Mountain	Best Supporting Actress – Motion Picture	Won	
2005	Bridget Jones: The Edge of Reason	Best Actress in a Motion Picture – Musical or Comedy	Nominated	
2007	Miss Potter	Best Actress in a Motion Picture – Musical or Comedy	Nominated	
2020	Judy	Best Actress in a Motion Picture – Drama	Won	

=== Grammy Awards ===
Year	Nominated work	Category	Result	Ref.
2021	Judy	Best Traditional Pop Vocal Album	Nominated	

=== Screen Actors Guild Awards ===
Year	Nominated work	Category	Result	Ref.
1997	Jerry Maguire	Outstanding Performance by a Female Actor in a Supporting Role in a Motion Picture	Nominated	
2002	Bridget Jones's Diary	Outstanding Performance by a Female Actor in a Leading Role in a Motion Picture	Nominated	
2003	Chicago	Outstanding Performance by a Female Actor in a Leading Role in a Motion Picture	Won	
2003	Chicago	Outstanding Performance by an Ensemble Cast in a Motion Picture	Won	
2004	Cold Mountain	Outstanding Performance by a Female Actor in a Supporting Role in a Motion Picture	Won	
2020	Judy	Outstanding Performance by a Female Actor in a Leading Role in a Motion Picture	Won	

== Other associations ==
=== Atlanta Film Critics Circle ===
Year	Nominated work	Category	Result
2019	Judy	Best Lead Actress	Won

=== AACTA International Awards ===
Year	Nominated work	Category	Result
2019	Judy	Best International Lead Actress – Cinema	Nominated

=== AARP's Movies For Grownups Awards ===
Year	Nominated work	Category	Result
2019	Judy	Best Actress	Won

=== American Comedy Awards ===
Year	Nominated work	Category	Result
2000	Nurse Betty	Funniest Leading Actress in a Motion Picture	Nominated

=== Alliance of Women Film Journalists ===
Year	Nominated work	Category	Result
2001	Bridget Jones's Diary	Special Mention Award	Won
2019	Judy	Best Actress	Nominated
2019	Judy	Most Daring Performance	Nominated

=== Austin Film Critics Association ===
Year	Nominated work	Category	Result
2019	Judy	Best Actress	Nominated

=== Awards Circuit Community Awards ===
Year	Nominated work	Category	Result
1996	Jerry Maguire	Best Supporting Actress	Runner-up
2002	Chicago	Best Actress	Nominated
2002	Chicago	Best Cast	Nominated
2003	Cold Mountain	Best Supporting Actress	Won
2003	Cold Mountain	Best Cast	Nominated
2019	Judy	Best Actress	Won

=== British Independent Film Awards ===
Year	Nominated work	Category	Result
2019	Judy	Best Actress in a British Independent Film	Won

=== Blockbuster Entertainment Awards ===
Year	Nominated work	Category	Result
1996	Jerry Maguire	Favorite Supporting Actress – Comedy/Romance	Won
2000	Me, Myself & Irene	Favorite Actress – Comedy/Romance	Nominated

=== Capri Hollywood International Film Festival ===
Year	Nominated work	Category	Result
2019	Judy	Best Actress	Won

=== Central Ohio Film Critics Association ===
Year	Nominated work	Category	Result
2003	Cold Mountain	Best Supporting Actress	Won

=== Chicago Film Critics Association ===
Year	Nominated work	Category	Result
1996	Jerry Maguire & The Whole Wide World	Most Promising Actress	Nominated
2002	Chicago	Best Actress	Nominated
2003	Cold Mountain	Best Supporting Actress	Nominated
2019	Judy	Best Actress	Nominated

=== Critics' Choice Awards ===
Year	Nominated work	Category	Result
1997	Jerry Maguire	Best Movie Breakthrough Performance	Won
2002	Bridget Jones's Diary	Best Actress	Nominated
2003	Chicago	Best Cast	Won
2004	Cold Mountain	Best Supporting Actress	Won
2020	Judy	Best Actress	Won
2026	Bridget Jones: Mad About the Boy	Best Movie Made for Television	Nominated
2026	Bridget Jones: Mad About the Boy	Best Actress in a Limited Series or Movie Made for Television	Nominated

=== Dallas–Fort Worth Film Critics Association ===
Year	Nominated work	Category	Result
2000	Nurse Betty	Best Actress	4th place
2001	Bridget Jones's Diary	Best Actress	3rd place
2002	Chicago	Best Actress	2nd place
2003	Cold Mountain	Best Supporting Actress	Won
2019	Judy	Best Actress	2nd place

=== Detroit Film Critics Society ===
Year	Nominated work	Category	Result
2019	Judy	Best Actress	Nominated

=== Dorian Awards ===
Year	Nominated work	Category	Result
2019	Judy	Film Performance of the Year – Actress	Won

=== Dublin Film Critics Circle ===
Year	Nominated work	Category	Result
2019	Judy	Best Actress	4th place

=== Empire Awards ===
Year	Nominated work	Category	Result
2001	Bridget Jones's Diary	Best Actress	Nominated
2005	Cinderella Man	Best Actress	Nominated

=== Florida Film Critics Circle ===
Year	Nominated work	Category	Result
2019	Judy	Best Actress	Nominated

=== Georgia Film Critics Association ===
Year	Nominated work	Category	Result
2019	Judy	Best Actress	Nominated

=== Goldene Kamera ===
Year	Nominated work	Category	Result
2010	—N/a	Best International Actress	Won

=== Hasty Pudding Theatricals ===
Year	Nominated work	Category	Result
2009	—N/a	Woman of the Year	Won

=== Hollywood Critics Association ===
Year	Nominated work	Category	Result
2020	Judy	Best Actress	Won

=== Houston Film Critics Society ===
Year	Nominated work	Category	Result
2019	Judy	Best Actress	Won

=== IndieWire Critics Poll ===
Year	Nominated work	Category	Result
2019	Judy	Best Actress	3rd place

=== Independent Spirit Awards ===
Year	Nominated work	Category	Result
1994	Love and a .45	Best Debut Performance	Nominated
1996	The Whole Wide World	Best Female Lead	Nominated
2019	Judy	Best Female Lead	Won

=== Kansas City Film Critics Circle ===
Year	Nominated work	Category	Result
2000	Nurse Betty	Best Actress	Nominated
2001	Bridget Jones's Diary	Best Actress	Nominated
2002	Chicago	Best Actress	Won
2003	Cold Mountain	Best Supporting Actress	Won
2019	Judy	Best Actress	Won

=== London Film Critics' Circle ===
Year	Nominated work	Category	Result
2000	Nurse Betty	Actress of the Year	Nominated
2019	Judy	Actress of the Year	Won

=== Mar del Plata International Film Festival ===
Year	Nominated work	Category	Result
1996	The Whole Wide World	Best Actress	Won

=== MTV Movie & TV Awards ===
Year	Nominated work	Category	Result
1996	Jerry Maguire	Best Breakthrough Performance in a Movie	Nominated
2002	Bridget Jones's Diary	Best Kiss in a Movie (shared with Colin Firth)	Nominated

=== Music City Film Critics Association ===
Year	Nominated work	Category	Result
2019	Judy	Best Actress	Nominated

=== National Board of Review ===
Year	Nominated work	Category	Result
1996	Jerry Maguire	Breakthrough Performance	Won
2019	Judy	Best Actress	Won

=== National Society of Film Critics ===
Year	Nominated work	Category	Result
1996	Jerry Maguire	Best Supporting Actress	2nd place

=== New York Film Critics Circle ===
Year	Nominated work	Category	Result
1998	One True Thing & A Price Above Rubies	Best Actress	runner-up

=== North Carolina Film Critics Association ===
Year	Nominated work	Category	Result
2019	Judy	Best Actress	Nominated

=== Online Film Critics Society ===
Year	Nominated work	Category	Result
2002	Chicago	Best Cast	Nominated
2003	Cold Mountain	Best Supporting Actress	Nominated
2019	Judy	Best Actress	Nominated

=== Online Association of Female Film Critics ===
Year	Nominated work	Category	Result
2019	Judy	Best Actress	Nominated

=== Palm Springs International Film Festival ===
Year	Nominated work	Category	Result
2020	Judy	Desert Palm Achievement Award	Won

=== Phoenix Film Critics Society ===
Year	Nominated work	Category	Result
2000	Nurse Betty	Best Actress	Nominated
2002	Chicago	Best Actress	Nominated
2002	Chicago	Best Cast	Nominated
2003	Cold Mountain	Best Supporting Actress	Nominated
2019	Judy	Best Actress	Won

=== Russian Guild of Film Critics ===
Year	Nominated work	Category	Result
2003	Chicago	Best Foreign Actress	Nominated

=== San Diego Film Critics Society ===
Year	Nominated work	Category	Result
2000	Nurse Betty	Best Actress	Nominated
2003	Cold Mountain	Best Supporting Actress	Won
2019	Judy	Best Actress	Nominated

=== Santa Barbara International Film Festival ===
Year	Nominated work	Category	Result
2020	Judy	American Riviera Award	Won

=== Satellite Awards ===
Year	Nominated work	Category	Result
1996	Jerry Maguire	Best Supporting Actress in a Motion Picture	Nominated
2000	Nurse Betty	Best Actress in a Motion Picture	Won
2001	Bridget Jones's Diary	Best Actress in a Motion Picture	Nominated
2002	White Oleander	Best Supporting Actress in a Motion Picture	Nominated
2002	Chicago	Best Actress in a Motion Picture	Nominated
2020	Judy	Best Actress in a Motion Picture	Nominated

=== Saturn Awards ===
Year	Nominated work	Category	Result
2006	Miss Potter	Best Film Lead Actress	Nominated

=== Seattle Film Critics Society ===
Year	Nominated work	Category	Result
2019	Judy	Best Actress	Nominated

=== Southeastern Film Critics Association ===
Year	Nominated work	Category	Result
2003	Cold Mountain	Best Supporting Actress	Won

=== St. Louis Film Critics Association ===
Year	Nominated work	Category	Result
2005	Cinderella Man	Best Supporting Actress	Nominated
2019	Judy	Best Actress	Runner-up

=== Teen Choice Awards ===
Year	Nominated work	Category	Result
2001	Bridget Jones's Diary	Choice Chemistry (shared with Hugh Grant)	Nominated
2002	Chicago	Choice Movie Liar	Nominated
2004	Bridget Jones: The Edge of Reason	Choice Movie Blush Scene (Bridget lands in a pig pen)	Nominated
2004	Bridget Jones: The Edge of Reason	Choice Movie Rockstar Moment (for singing "Like a Virgin")	Nominated

=== Telluride Film Festival ===
Year	Nominated work	Category	Result
2019	—N/a	Silver Medallion	Won

=== Texas Film Awards ===
Year	Nominated work	Category	Result
2011	—N/a	Texas Film Hall of Fame	Won

=== Toronto Film Critics Association ===
Year	Nominated work	Category	Result
2019	Judy	Best Actress	Nominated

=== Visual Effects Society ===
Year	Nominated work	Category	Result
2004	Shark Tale	Outstanding Performance by an Animated Character in an Animated Motion Picture	Nominated

=== Washington D.C. Area Film Critics Association ===
Year	Nominated work	Category	Result
2002	White Oleander	Best Supporting Actress	Nominated
2003	Cold Mountain	Best Supporting Actress	Nominated
2019	Judy	Best Actress	Nominated

=== Women Film Critics Circle ===
Year	Nominated work	Category	Result
2019	Judy	Best Actress	Runner-up

=== Women in Film Crystal + Lucy Awards ===
Year	Nominated work	Category	Result
2007	—N/a	Crystal Award	Honored
