= Same Kind of Different as Me (film) =

2017 film by Michael Carney

- Theatrical release poster
- Directed by: Michael Carney
- Screenplay by: Ron Hall; Alexander Foard; Michael Carney
- Based on: Same Kind of Different as Me by Denver Moore; Ron Hall; Lynn Vincent
- Produced by: Cale Boyter; Ron Hall; Stephen D. Johnston; Darren Moorman; Mary Parent
- Starring: Greg Kinnear; Renée Zellweger; Djimon Hounsou; Olivia Holt; Jon Voight
- Cinematography: Don Burgess
- Edited by: Eric A. Sears
- Music by: John Paesano
- Production companies: Paramount Pictures; Disruption Entertainment
- Distributed by: Pure Flix Entertainment
- Release date: October 20, 2017
- Running time: 119 minutes
- Country: United States
- Language: English
- Budget: $6.5 million
- Box office: $6.4 million

Same Kind of Different as Me is a 2017 American Christian drama film directed by Michael Carney, in his feature directorial debut, and written by Ron Hall, Alexander Foard and Michael Carney. It is based on the 2006 book by Hall, Denver Moore and Lynn Vincent. The film stars Greg Kinnear, Renée Zellweger, Djimon Hounsou, Olivia Holt, Jon Voight, and Stephanie Leigh Schlund. The film was released on October 20, 2017, by Pure Flix Entertainment. The film received mixed reviews but still made $6.4 million in cinemas against a total budget of $6.5 million including marketing and advertising.

== Plot ==
Ron Hall, a successful art dealer, comes to the home of Julio, a man he previously sold a painting to. Julio allows him to stay so he can write a book about his life and a life-changing event he experienced.

Two years earlier, Ron admits to his wife Debbie that he had an affair. Although very upset, she gives him another chance, but only if he makes up for his selfishness by helping her out at the local homeless shelter.

Initially, Ron is cynical about this and is anxious to get out. They both notice a rather violent member of the community and Debbie convinces him to offer his friendship to him. The man is grateful and introduces himself as Denver. Over time, Ron and Debbie develop a heartwarming and inspiring friendship with him.

The couple even invite Denver over to spend the night. Denver reveals his life story to them: he grew up in the care of his grandmother who died in a fire that consumed their home. He soon left and became a sharecropper on a plantation where he was attacked by the KKK for having a white friend and talking to a white woman.

Eventually, Denver fled the plantation and came to a town where he was arrested for attempted robbery. In jail, he killed a small group of prisoners when they attacked him. Ron and Debbie forgive him for his actions which he deeply appreciates. It is soon revealed that Debbie has terminal cancer.

Ron and Debbie invite Denver to spend the holidays with their family including Ron's mother Tommye and alcoholic father Earl whom Ron does not get along with. Earl further sours their relationship when he insults both Denver and Debbie, causing Ron to sever ties with him. This pains Denver, who never had a father and thinks there is a good man inside Earl.

Debbie says her final goodbyes to her children, Regan and Carson. She then tells Ron to have happiness with whomever he wants. Debbie tells him where she wants to be buried. Later, both Ron and Denver share a dance with Debbie. Not long after, she dies.

After the funeral, Ron stops visiting Denver. Back in the present, Ron leaves Julio's house and goes to Denver where they have a happy reunion. Denver suggests Ron visit Earl. At his parents' house, Ron finds a much happier Earl who has given up drinking and made up with Tommye who thanks Ron. Ron and Denver go camping near Debbie's grave and reminisce about her.

In closing titles, it is revealed Ron finished his book with Denver's help and the two travel cross-country sharing their story and getting funds for other homeless shelters.

== Cast ==
- Greg Kinnear as Ron Hall
- Renée Zellweger as Deborah Hall
- Djimon Hounsou as Denver Moore
- Jon Voight as Earl Hall
- Olivia Holt as Reagan Hall
- Austin Filson as Carson Hall
- Geraldine Singer as Tommye Hall
- Daniel Zacapa as Julio Larraz
- Dana Gourrier as Willow
- Thomas Francis Murphy as Chef Jim
- Ann Mahoney as Clara
- Theodus Crane as Tiny
- David Dino Wells Jr. as Mister
- Pedro Lucero as Killer
- Mary Hunter Johnston as Little Girl
- Lucky Johnson as Thug (Clara's Pimp)
- David Jensen as Homeless Man #1
- Trey McGriff as Homeless Man #2
- Michael Southworth as Homeless Man #3
- Ashton Cotton as Denver (Boy)
  - Bradford Whalen as Denver (Young Adult)
- Tonea Stewart as Big Mama
- Stephanie Leigh Schlund as C.C.
- Lara Grice as Bobby's mother
- Mykel Shannon Jenkins as B.B.
- Nyles Julian Steele as Chook
- David Jensen as Bum
- Kenda Benwar as Janet
- Ty Parker as Bobby
- John Newberg as Hank
- Calvin Williams as Uncle James

== Production ==
On October 20, 2014, Renée Zellweger joined the cast to play Deborah. On October 28, 2014, Greg Kinnear, Djimon Hounsou and Jon Voight joined the cast. On November 7, 2014, Olivia Holt joined the cast to play Regan Hall. Principal photography began on October 27, 2014, and ended on December 19, 2014.

== Release ==
The film was originally scheduled to be released on April 29, 2016, but was pushed back to February 3, 2017. On December 30, 2016, the film was pushed back to October 20, 2017, and was acquired by Pure Flix Entertainment. The film was released on DVD and Blu-ray on February 20, 2018.

== Reception ==
On review aggregator website Rotten Tomatoes, the film has an approval rating of 44% based on nine reviews and an average rating of 5.8/10. On Metacritic, which assigns a weighted average rating, the film has a score of 47 out of 100 based on seven critics, indicating "mixed or average reviews".
