= Renée Zellweger =

American actress (born 1969)

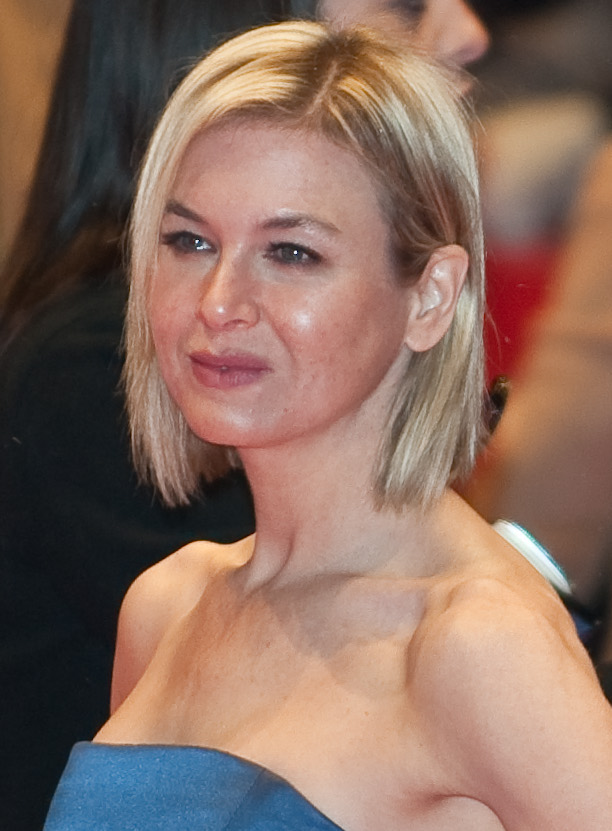
- Zellweger in 2010
- Born: Renée Kathleen Zellweger; April 25, 1969 (age 57); Katy, Texas, U.S.
- Education: University of Texas at Austin (BA)
- Occupation: Actress
- Years active: 1992–present
- Spouse: Kenny Chesney (m. 2005; ann. 2005)
- Awards: Full list

Renée Kathleen Zellweger (Note: Pronunciation of "Renée Zellweger": /rəˌneɪ ˈzɛlwɛɡər/, rə-NAY ZEL-weg-ər) (born April 25, 1969) is an American actress. Her accolades include two Academy Awards, two British Academy Film Awards, and four Golden Globe Awards.

Born and raised in Texas, Zellweger studied English literature at the University of Texas at Austin. Initially aspiring for a career in journalism, she was drawn to acting following her brief work on stage while in college. Following minor roles in Dazed and Confused (1993) and Reality Bites (1994), her first starring role came with the slasher film The Return of the Texas Chainsaw Massacre (1995). She rose to prominence with starring roles in the romantic comedy Jerry Maguire (1996), the drama One True Thing (1998), and the black comedies Me, Myself & Irene and Nurse Betty (both 2000), winning a Golden Globe Award for the last of these.

For her portrayal of Bridget Jones in the romantic comedy Bridget Jones's Diary (2001) and Roxie Hart in the musical Chicago (2002), Zellweger gained consecutive nominations for the Academy Award for Best Actress. She won the Academy Award for Best Supporting Actress for playing a loquacious farmer in the war film Cold Mountain (2003). She starred in the sports biographical film Cinderella Man (2005). She reprised her role as Jones in the sequel Bridget Jones: The Edge of Reason (2004) and, following a career hiatus, in Bridget Jones's Baby (2016). In 2019, Zellweger starred in her first major television role in the Netflix series What/If, and portrayed Judy Garland in the biopic Judy, winning the Academy Award for Best Actress. She has since starred as Pam Hupp in the NBC crime miniseries The Thing About Pam (2022) and played Jones again in Bridget Jones: Mad About the Boy (2025).

== Early life ==
Renée Kathleen Zellweger was born on April 25, 1969, in Katy, Texas. Her father, Emil Erich Zellweger, is from the Swiss town of Au, St. Gallen. He was a mechanical and electrical engineer who worked in the oil-refining business. Her mother, Kjellfrid, is Norwegian of Kven and Sámi descent. Kjellfrid grew up in Ekkerøy near the town Vadsø in the northern part of Norway. She was a nurse and midwife who moved to the United States to work as a governess for a Norwegian family in Texas. Referring to her religious background, Zellweger has described herself as being raised in a family of "lazy Catholics and Episcopalians".

Zellweger attended Katy High School, where she was a cheerleader and was active in athletics, participating in soccer and powderpuff football. In 1986, her academic paper, "The Karankawas and Their Roots", won third place in the first-ever Houston Post High School Natural Science Essay Contest. After graduating from high school, she enrolled at the University of Texas at Austin, where she majored in English literature with the intention of pursuing a career in teaching or journalism. While in college, she worked as a cocktail waitress at a strip club in Austin to fund her education. To fulfill a fine arts credit required for her degree, she enrolled in a drama elective, which sparked her interest in acting. She graduated in 1992 with a Bachelor of Arts.

In her junior year, she began getting small parts as an actor, and earned her Screen Actors Guild card for doing a Coors Light commercial. Also while in college, she did "a bit part ... as a local hire" in the Austin-filmed horror-comedy film My Boyfriend's Back, playing "the girl in the beauty shop, maybe two lines. But the beauty shop [scene] got cut." Her first job after graduation was working in a beef commercial, while simultaneously auditioning for roles around Houston.

== Career ==
=== 1992–1995: Early roles ===
While still in Texas, Zellweger appeared in several independent and low-budget films. One was A Taste for Killing (1992), followed by a role in the ABC miniseries Murder in the Heartland (1993). Also in 1993, she had an uncredited role in Dazed and Confused. In 1994, she appeared in Reality Bites, the directorial debut of Ben Stiller, and in the biographical film 8 Seconds, directed by John G. Avildsen. Her first main role in a movie came with the 1995 horror film The Return of the Texas Chainsaw Massacre, alongside Matthew McConaughey, playing a teenager who leaves a prom early with three friends who get into a car accident, which leads to their meeting a murderous family, led by the iconic Leatherface. While the film went unnoticed, Joe Leydon for Variety magazine lauded Zellweger, calling her "the most formidable scream queen since Jamie Lee Curtis went legit."

In her next film, the crime comedy Love and a .45 (1994), Zellweger played a woman who plans a robbery with her boyfriend. Although the film received a limited release in theaters, Marc Savlov of Austin Chronicle applauded the main cast saying they were "all excellent in their roles" and noted that "Zellweger's character – all squeals and caged sexuality – seems a bit too close to Juliette Lewis' Mallory Knox (of Natural Born Killers) to be as fresh as it should be". The part earned her an Independent Spirit Award for Best Debut Performance. She subsequently relocated to Los Angeles, a move she had postponed several times because she believed she lacked the talent and experience to be a competitive actor in that city. She would next appear in the coming-of-age drama Empire Records (1995). Rotten Tomatoes' consensus was: "Despite a terrific soundtrack and a strong early performance from Renee Zellweger, Empire Records is mostly a silly and predictable teen dramedy."

=== 1996–2000: Breakthrough ===
Zellweger came to wider recognition through her role in Jerry Maguire (1996), playing a single mother and the romantic interest of a glossy sports agent (Tom Cruise). The film grossed over US$273 million worldwide. It was Cruise who chose her to play his love interest and later credited her with "revealing the core humanity of the movie". Roger Ebert, acknowledging Zellweger's and Cruise's chemistry, wrote: "The film is often a delight, especially when Cruise and Zellweger are together on the screen. He plays Maguire with the earnestness of a man who wants to find greatness and happiness in an occupation where only success really counts. She plays a woman who believes in this guy she loves, and reminds us that true love is about idealism." For her performance, Zellweger was nominated for the Screen Actors Guild Award for Outstanding Performance by a Female Actor in a Supporting Role.

In the religious drama A Price Above Rubies (1998), Zellweger starred as a young woman who finds it difficult to conform to the restrictions imposed on her by the community. The film flopped at the box office, but Zellweger was applauded by some critics such as Ebert, who wrote that she gave a "ferociously strong performance". That same year, she also starred in the drama One True Thing, opposite William Hurt and Meryl Streep. She played a woman, based on author Anna Quindlen, forced to put her life on hold in order to care for her mother, who is dying of cancer. One True Thing took in a modest US$23 million in the US, but had a favorable critical response; Variety magazine's Todd McCarthy stated about Zellweger, "Projecting gravity and impatience that she hasn't shown before, Zellweger is outstanding as the smart young woman who resents the interruption to her life's momentum but ends up growing in ways she never would have expected."

After playing the female lead opposite Chris O'Donnell in the romantic comedy The Bachelor (1999), Zellweger starred in the Farrelly brothers comedy Me, Myself & Irene (2000), with Jim Carrey, as a woman on the run for what she believes is a false accusation set up by her mob-connected ex-boyfriend. It was a commercial success, grossing US$149 million worldwide.

In the black comedy Nurse Betty (2000), directed by Neil LaBute and starring Morgan Freeman, Zellweger played a Kansas waitress who suffers a nervous breakdown after witnessing her husband's murder. San Francisco Chronicle found the actress to be "a performer who emanates kindness and a pure heart", and Variety remarked: "Few actresses can convey the kind of honesty and humanity that Zellweger does here — it's hard to imagine the film without her dominant, thoroughly credible performance". She won her first Golden Globe Award for Best Actress – Motion Picture Musical or Comedy, but she was in the bathroom when future co-star Hugh Grant announced her name. She later protested: "I had lipstick on my teeth!"

=== 2001–2007: Bridget Jones and worldwide recognition ===
In 2001, Zellweger was cast in the lead role of Bridget Jones, opposite Hugh Grant and Colin Firth, in the British romantic comedy Bridget Jones's Diary, based on the 1996 novel of the same name by Helen Fielding. The casting of Zellweger came amid much controversy since she was neither British nor plump, and did not smoke. During casting, Zellweger was told she was too thin to play the cherubic, chain-smoking Bridget, so she quickly embarked on gaining the required weight (20 pounds) and learning to speak in an English accent while she smoked herbal cigarettes. In addition to receiving dialect coaching to fine-tune her accent, part of Zellweger's preparations involved spending three weeks working undercover in a "work experience placement" for British publishing firm Picador in Victoria, London. Her portrayal of Jones led Stephen Holden of The New York Times to comment, "Ms. Zellweger accomplishes the small miracle of making Bridget both entirely endearing and utterly real." The role earned her a second Golden Globe Award nomination for Best Actress – Motion Picture Musical or Comedy, and her first Academy Award and BAFTA Award nominations for Best Leading Actress. Bridget Jones's Diary was a major commercial success, earning US$281 million worldwide.

Zellweger took on the role of a former actress serving as a foster mother, alongside Michelle Pfeiffer, in the drama White Oleander (2002), for which she received a Satellite Award nomination for Best Supporting Actress – Drama. She also portrayed Roxie Hart in the 2002 musical film Chicago, directed by Rob Marshall and co-starring Catherine Zeta-Jones, Richard Gere, Queen Latifah, and John C. Reilly. The film won Best Picture at the 75th Academy Awards. Writing for The Daily Telegraph, Tim Robey labeled Chicago the "best screen musical [since 1972's Cabaret]", and the San Francisco Chronicle commented, "Zellweger is a joy to watch, with marvelous comic timing and, in her stage numbers, a commanding presence". She earned her second Academy Award and BAFTA Award nominations for Best Leading Actress, winning her second Golden Globe Award for Best Actress – Motion Picture Musical or Comedy and the Screen Actors Guild Award for Outstanding Performance by a Female Actor in a Leading Role.

In 2003, following Chicago, Zellweger starred with Ewan McGregor in the little-seen romantic comedy Down with Love, as a woman advocating female independence in the 1950s and early 1960s, and appeared in Anthony Minghella's war drama Cold Mountain, opposite Nicole Kidman and Jude Law, playing a woman who helps a farmer following her father's death. The film garnered several award nominations and wins for its actors; Zellweger won the award for Best Supporting Actress at the 76th Academy Awards, the 61st Golden Globe Awards, the 10th Screen Actors Guild Awards, and the 57th British Academy Film Awards.

In 2004, Zellweger provided her voice for the DreamWorks Animation film Shark Tale, and reprised her title role in Bridget Jones: The Edge of Reason, which made US$262 million around the globe and earned her a fourth Golden Globe Award for Best Actress – Motion Picture Musical or Comedy nomination. In 2005, she played the wife of world heavyweight boxing champion James J. Braddock in Ron Howard's drama Cinderella Man, opposite Russell Crowe and Paul Giamatti. In his review for the film, David Ansen of Newsweek, wrote that the actress "has an uncanny ability to make us swallow even the most movie-ish moments". On May 24, 2005, Zellweger received a star on the Hollywood Walk of Fame for her contributions to the motion picture industry.

Zellweger portrayed author Beatrix Potter in the biographical comedy Miss Potter, with Emily Watson and Ewan McGregor. She also served as an executive producer as she wanted to get more involved in the production. William Arnold of Seattle Post-Intelligencer concluded that Zellweger "strikes just the right chord of inspiration, eccentricity and uncompromising artistic drive." For her portrayal, she earned her sixth nomination for the Golden Globe Award (and her fifth one in the category of Best Actress – Musical or Comedy). In 2007, Zellweger lent her voice to the animated family comedy Bee Movie and was awarded the Women in Film Crystal award.

=== 2008–2014: Career fluctuations and hiatus ===
With George Clooney in his directorial venture, the period comedy Leatherheads (2008), about the early years of professional American football, Zellweger portrayed a Chicago Tribune newspaper reporter. The film received largely mixed reviews and made US$13.5 million in its opening weekend, described as "disappointing" by website Box Office Mojo. MTV.com praised the actress for "displaying an unexpected gift for drawling sarcasm", but Kevin Williamson for website Jam! criticized her role, remarking that she, "as the kind of lippy heroine epitomized by Rosalind Russell, is miscast in a role that demands snark, not sleepy-eyed sweetness". In the western Appaloosa (2008), Zellweger played a beguiling widow opposite Ed Harris and Viggo Mortensen. The film grossed US$20 million at the North American box office. Zellweger produced the made-for-television feature Living Proof, starring Harry Connick Jr., about the true story of Denny Slamon. It was co-produced by Craig Zadan and Neil Meron, and premiered in October 2008 on Lifetime Television.

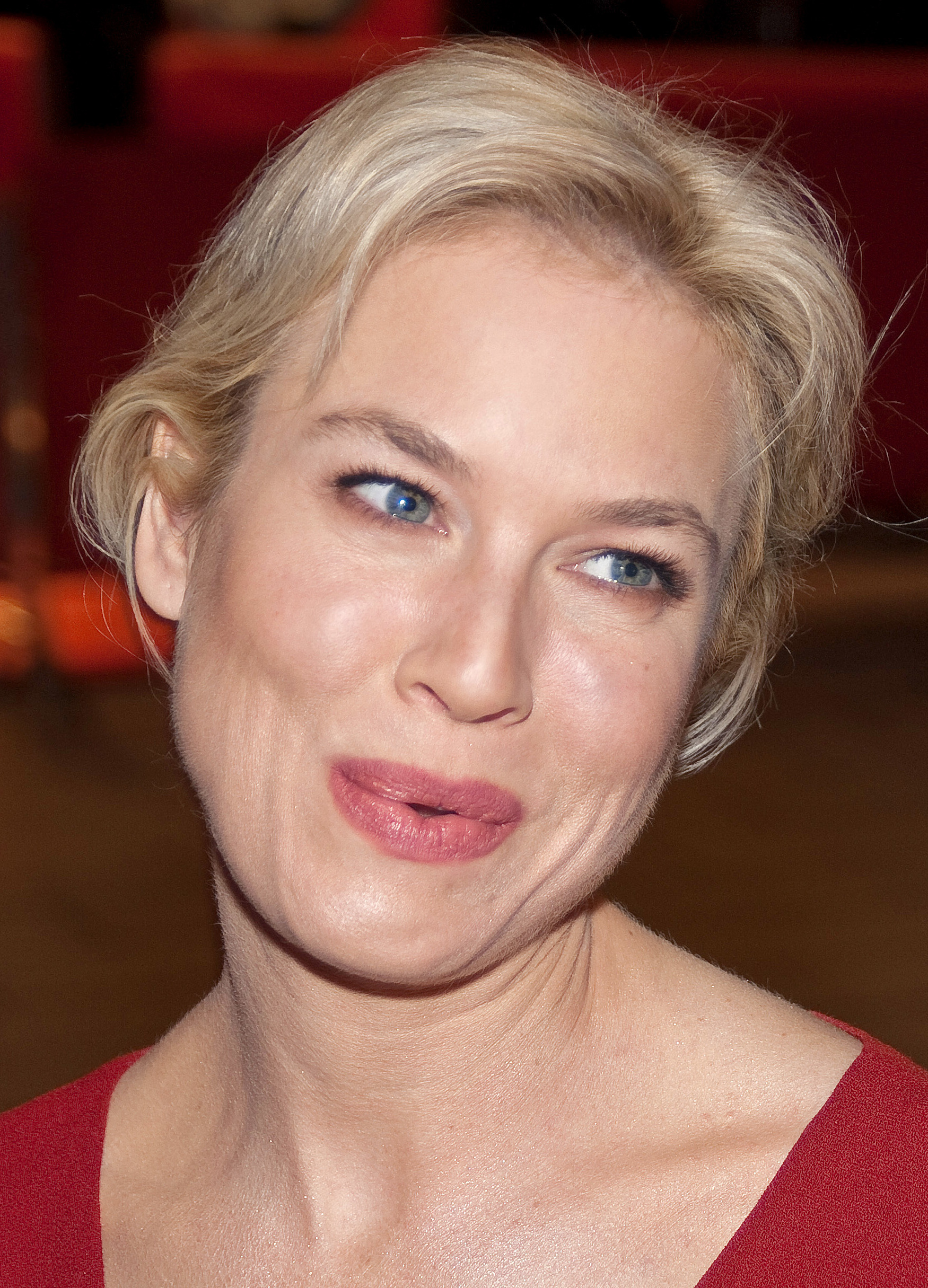
Zellweger at the 2009 Berlin International Film Festival

Her next film was the 2009 comedy New in Town, in which she played a Miami high-powered consultant adjusting to her new life in a small Minnesota town. The movie rated poorly with reviewers and made a lackluster US$16 million in its domestic theatrical run. Peter Bradshaw of The Guardian stated that her "rabbity, dimply pout – surely the strangest facial expression in Hollywood – simpers and twitches out of the screen in this moderate girly flick that adheres with almost religious fanaticism to the feelgood romcom handbook". In 2009, she also provided her voice for a supporting character in DreamWorks' animated film Monsters vs. Aliens, and starred as the mother of actor George Hamilton in the comedy My One and Only, which despite being distributed for a limited release to certain parts of the United States only. Bill Gray, of Entertainment Weekly felt that she played her part "to her strengths", and reviewer Mick LaSalle found her performance to be a "standout".

Zellweger took on the role of a social worker assigned to a mysterious girl in Case 39, a supernatural thriller she had filmed in 2006. The title had a lengthy post-production and was not released in theaters in the United States until 2010. It was universally panned by critics and only earned US$5.3 million in its opening weekend, leading Indiewire to write that Zellweger "faces an [u]ncertain [f]uture" as she was in "an unforgiving industry that doles out few juicy roles for women over 40." The road drama My Own Love Song, in which she played a former singer suffering from paralysis, was screened at the 2010 Tribeca Film Festival, and released for DVD.

After My Own Love Song was released, Zellweger took a four-year hiatus from screen acting, as she found the time to "go away and grow up a bit". Reflecting on this period of time in a July 2016 interview with British Vogue, she explained: "I was fatigued and wasn't taking the time I needed to recover between projects, and it caught up with me [...] I got sick of the sound of my own voice". In 2013, Zellweger co-created and executive produced Cinnamon Girl, an original drama series set in the Hollywood movie and music scenes of the late 1960s and early 1970s, but the Lifetime network passed on the pilot. That same year, she was considered for a supporting role in the film August: Osage County alongside Andrea Riseborough but the role ultimately went to Juliette Lewis.

=== 2014–present: Resurgence and Judy ===
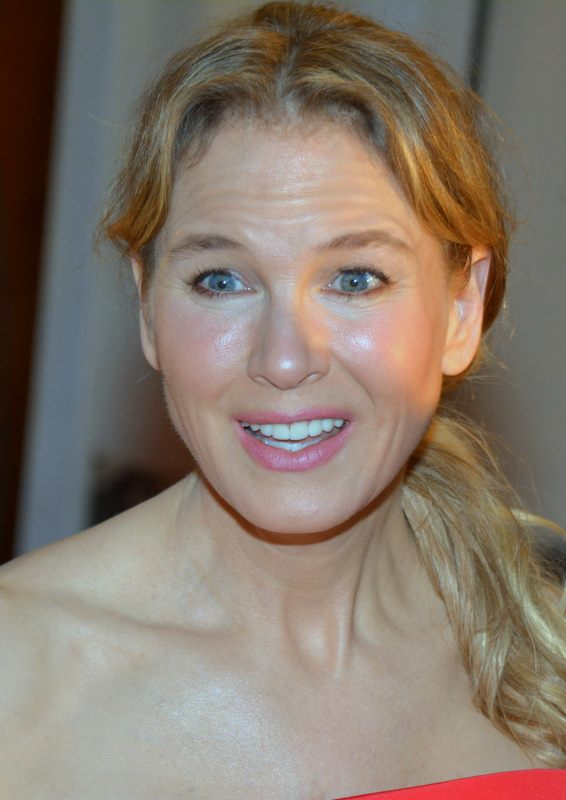
Zellweger at the French premiere of Bridget Jones's Baby in 2016

Following a four-year hiatus from acting, Zellweger took on the pivotal role of Loretta Lassiter, an abused, yet devious wife. She plays the mother of a teenage son who is accused of murdering his wealthy father in a courtroom crime drama, The Whole Truth, directed by Courtney Hunt and with Keanu Reeves ostensibly playing her son's defense lawyer. Principal photography of the film, which is set in New Orleans, commenced in July 2014. The film was released following extensive post production, in the US during 2016.

Zellweger made her trilogy comeback, opposite Colin Firth and Patrick Dempsey in the romantic comedy Bridget Jones's Baby (2016), the third Bridget Jones franchise, portraying Jones as single and in her forties discovering that she is pregnant and must figure out who the father is. The film was met with a positive response by critics and grossed US$211.9 million worldwide. Village Voice found the movie to be "the warmest and most satisfying of the series" and concluded that Zellweger's "wise, light-hearted performance anchors this happy reunion, a surprising and refreshing gift from a creative well that seemed to have run dry".

In Same Kind of Different as Me (2017), a film adaptation of the autobiographical book by the same name, Zellweger starred with Djimon Hounsou, Olivia Holt and Jon Voight, as the wife of an art dealer whose struggling relationship is changed for the better by a homeless man. The film received mixed reviews from critics and was a moderate commercial success. The Wrap, nevertheless, remarked: "Zellweger, in fact, delivers a gentle, thoughtful, yet headstrong performance as the wife who digs in her heels to get human decency out of the people she cares for the most". She played the friend of a New York City singer who gets a life-changing medical diagnosis in the independent drama Here and Now (2018), opposite Sarah Jessica Parker. Dana Schwartz of Entertainment Weekly praised the appearance of Zellweger, describing the film as "heightened by the magnetic Renée Zellweger, barely concealing her suburban rage behind a cheerfully swirled glass of wine."

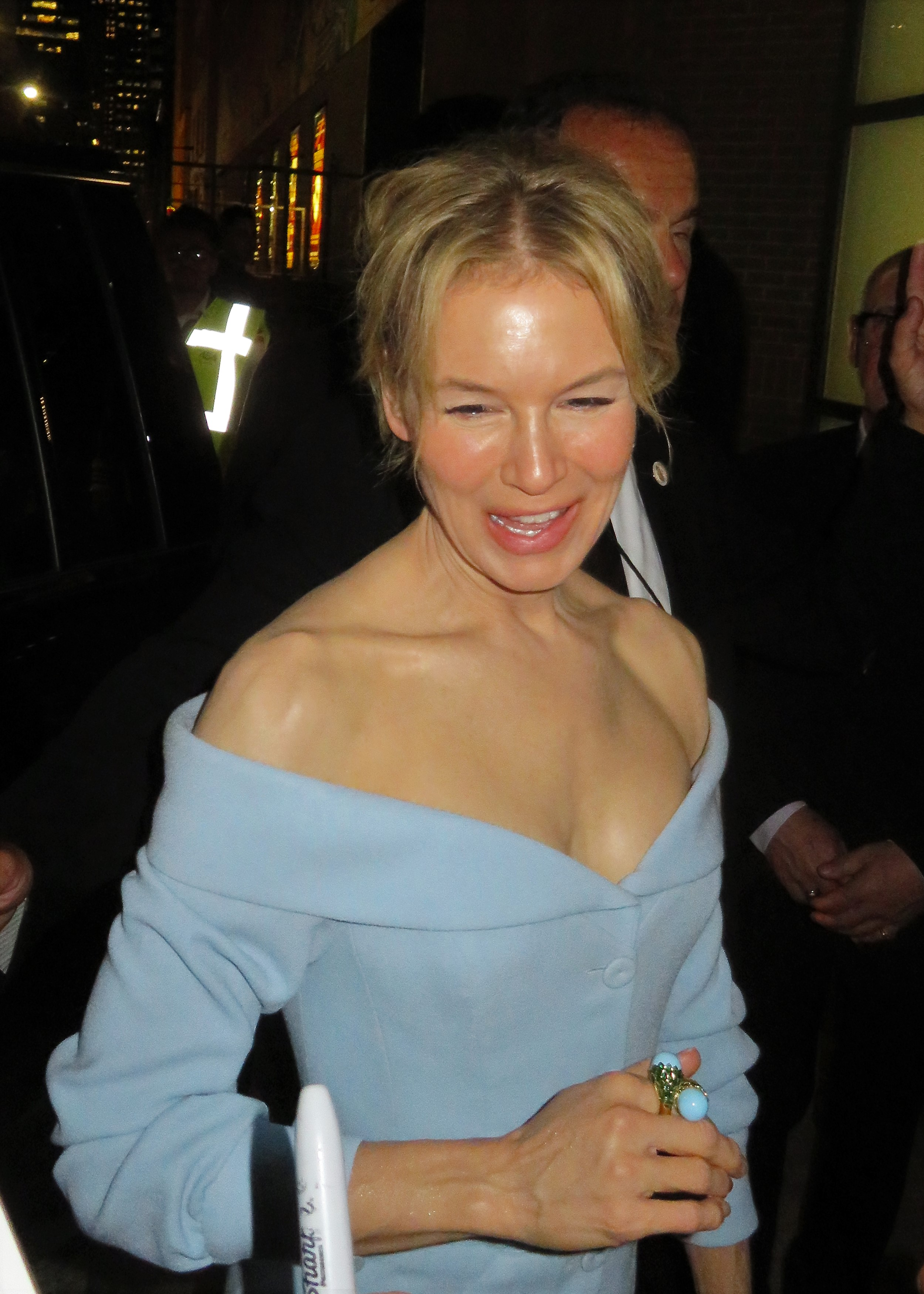
Zellweger attending a screening of Judy at the 2019 Toronto International Film Festival

Zellweger obtained her first major television role when she was cast as Anne Montgomery, a mysterious venture capitalist, in the Netflix thriller miniseries What/If (2019). Although the show received mixed reviews from critics, Zellweger's performance was praised, with Haider Rifaat of The Express Tribune writing, "Not to forgo the incredible acting prowess of Zellweger, who impeccably embraces the character of Anne. Subtle gestures, symbolic interaction and character development are some commendable aspects that intensify the actors' performances."

Her next role was that of Judy Garland in 2019's biographical drama Judy. Based on the West End and Broadway play End of the Rainbow, the film chronicles the last years of Garland's life, shortly before her death in 1969. Zellweger performed her own vocals in the film and her songs had to be performed in front of a live audience. Judy premiered to positive reviews at the Telluride Film Festival, and certain critics considered it to be the finest performance of her career. It also screened at the Toronto International Film Festival on September 10, 2019. Zoe Gahan of Vanity Fair found her "witty, sharp and devastating in the title role" and added that "it is hard to tell where Garland stops and Zellweger starts". Peter Travers of Rolling Stone opined, "Zellweger performs miracles playing Judy Garland: singing her heart out, baring her bruised soul and acting with a ferocity that ultimately rises to a state of grace." For her portrayal of Garland, Zellweger won numerous awards and accolades, including the Golden Globe Award, Screen Actors Guild Award, BAFTA Award and Academy Award. Zellweger's win made her just the seventh actress to win an Oscar in both acting categories and the fourth to win Best Actress after Best Supporting Actress. The film's soundtrack additionally earned her a Grammy Award nomination for Best Traditional Pop Vocal Album.

Two and a half years later, in 2022, Zellweger took on her first starring role in network television in the NBC crime drama miniseries The Thing About Pam. She starred as Pam Hupp, who was involved in the 2011 murder of Betsy Faria. The part required her to wear face and body prosthetics, which took 80 minutes to apply. The series and her performance received mixed reviews from critics. IndieWire's Ben Travers called her performance "exaggerated", while John Doyle of The Globe and Mail said that she "brings an equal amount of vinegary exuberance to the work".

Zellweger played Jones again in the sequel Bridget Jones: Mad About the Boy, which released in 2025. In the same year, she joined the cast of Hulu's Only Murders in the Building for its fifth season, in the role of Camila White.

== Public image ==
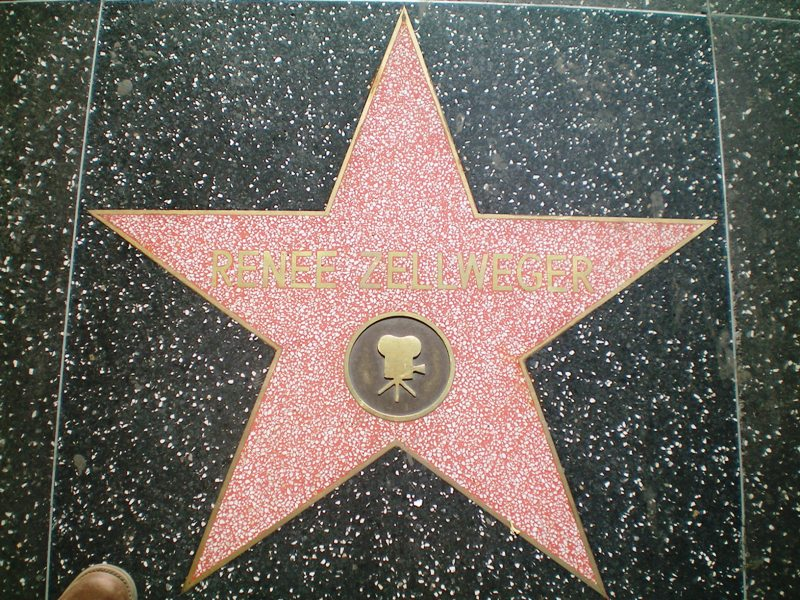
Zellweger's star on the Hollywood Walk of Fame

Zellweger has appeared on the covers and photo shoots of several magazines throughout her career; she appeared on the September 1997 cover of Vanity Fair, and in subsequent years, the list has grown to include Vogue, Detour, Allure and Harper's Bazaar. Zellweger often draws attention for her style at award ceremonies and red carpet events, specifically for her frequent use of dresses designed by Carolina Herrera, a close friend who has worked with the actress for over fifteen years after they met at a Costume Institute gala. She is also a frequent attendee at New York Fashion Week, among other fashion events.

In April 1997, Vanity Fair named her part of "Hollywood's Next Wave of Stars". She was placed on E!'s "Top 20 Entertainers of 2001" list and was chosen by People magazine as one of the 50 most beautiful people in the world in 2003. She also ranked number 72 in the "Top 100 Celebrities" list made by Forbes in 2006, and the following year, she was placed at 20 among "the 20 richest women in entertainment", by the magazine.

Following her performance on Jerry Maguire, Israeli singer songwriter Ariel Horowitz wrote, composed and performed a song called "Renee" in 2001, after watching the film. Horowitz said he was stunned by her performance. The song tells the fantasy in which he meets Zellweger, they fall in love and return to live in Israel, and she becomes a local movie star. The song was one of the most popular songs in Israel in 2002.

After Zellweger attended the 21st annual Elle Women in Hollywood Awards in October 2014, there was media and social commentary that she was hardly recognizable, which prompted speculation that she had undergone cosmetic surgery. Zellweger responded, "Perhaps I look different. Who doesn't as they get older?! Ha. But I am different. I'm happy."

== Personal life ==
From 1999 to 2000, Zellweger was engaged to Jim Carrey. In 2003, she had a brief relationship with musician Jack White. In May 2005, Zellweger married singer Kenny Chesney. Four months later, Zellweger obtained an annulment.

From 2009 to 2011 she was in a relationship with Bradley Cooper, after having met on the set of Case 39 which was filmed in 2006.

She was previously in a relationship with musician Doyle Bramhall II. In June 2021, Zellweger began dating English television presenter Ant Anstead whom she met filming Celebrity IOU: Joyride.

== Activism ==
Zellweger took part in the 2005 HIV prevention campaign of the Swiss Federal Office of Public Health.

Zellweger is one of the patrons for gender equality foundation The GREAT Initiative; in 2011 she visited Liberia with the charity. In April 2011, she collaborated with Tommy Hilfiger to design a handbag to raise money and awareness for the Breast Health Institute. "Because of the experiences of close friends and family members who have had to endure and battle the challenges of breast cancer, I am a passionate supporter of breast health education and charitable causes", Zellweger stated about joining the campaign.

== Awards and nominations ==
Among her numerous accolades for her acting work, Zellweger has received two Academy Awards, two BAFTA Awards, four Critics' Choice Movie Awards, four Golden Globe Awards, an Independent Spirit Awards, four Screen Actors Guild Awards, a British Independent Film Awards, and awards from the London Film Critics Circle, National Board of Review, National Society of Film Critics, New York Film Critics Circle, and Santa Barbara International Film Festival. Zellweger is only the fourth actress, after Meryl Streep, Jessica Lange, and Cate Blanchett, to win Best Actress after winning Best Supporting Actress and the seventh actress to win in both categories after Ingrid Bergman, Maggie Smith, Helen Hayes, Streep, Lange, and Blanchett.

== Filmography ==
=== Film ===
Year	Title	Role	Notes
1993	My Boyfriend's Back	—N/a	Deleted scenes
1993	Dazed and Confused	Nesi White	
1994	Reality Bites	Tami	
1994	8 Seconds	Prescott Buckle Bunny	
1994	Love and a .45	Starlene Cheatham	
1995	The Return of the Texas Chainsaw Massacre	Jennifer / Jenny	
1995	Empire Records	Gina	
1995	The Low Life	Poet	
1996	The Whole Wide World	Novalyne Price	
1996	Jerry Maguire	Dorothy Boyd	
1997	Deceiver	Elizabeth	
1998	A Price Above Rubies	Sonia Horowitz	
1998	One True Thing	Ellen Gulden	
1999	The Bachelor	Anne Arden	
2000	Me, Myself & Irene	Irene P. Waters	
2000	Nurse Betty	Betty Sizemore	
2001	Bridget Jones's Diary	Bridget Jones	
2002	White Oleander	Claire Richards	
2002	Chicago	Roxie Hart	
2003	Down with Love	Barbara Novak	
2003	Cold Mountain	Ruby Thewes	
2004	Shark Tale	Angie	Voice
2004	Bridget Jones: The Edge of Reason	Bridget Jones	
2005	Cinderella Man	Mae Braddock	
2006	Miss Potter	Beatrix Potter	Also executive producer
2007	Bee Movie	Vanessa Bloome	Voice
2008	Leatherheads	Lexie Littleton	
2008	Appaloosa	Allie French	
2009	New in Town	Lucy Hill	
2009	Monsters vs. Aliens	Katie	Voice
2009	My One and Only	Anne Deveraux	
2009	Case 39	Emily Jenkins	
2010	My Own Love Song	Jane	
2016	Bridget Jones's Baby	Bridget Jones	
2016	The Whole Truth	Loretta	
2017	Same Kind of Different as Me	Deborah Hall	
2018	Here and Now	Tessa	
2019	Judy	Judy Garland	
2025	Bridget Jones: Mad About the Boy	Bridget Jones	Also executive producer
TBA	A Woman in the Sun	Claire Keating	Filming, also producer

=== Television ===
Year	Title	Role	Notes
1992	A Taste for Killing	Mary Lou	Television film
1993	Murder in the Heartland	Barbara Von Busch	Miniseries; uncredited
1994	Shake, Rattle and Rock!	Susan Doyle	Television film
2001	King of the Hill	Tammy Duvall (voice)	Episode: "Ho, Yeah!"
2008	Living Proof	—N/a	Television film; executive producer
2019	What/If	Anne Montgomery	Main cast
2022	The Thing About Pam	Pam Hupp	Limited series; also executive producer
2025	Only Murders in the Building	Camila White	Recurring guest role

== Discography ==
- Chicago: Music from the Miramax Motion Picture (2002)
- Judy (2019)

== See also ==
- List of actors with Academy Award nominations
- List of actors with two or more Academy Awards in acting categories
- List of actors with two or more Academy Award nominations in acting categories
