= Tarantinoesque film =

Film style

A Tarantinoesque film refers to a movie that uses the style of director Quentin Tarantino. These films often feature stylized and intense violence, non-linear narratives, awareness of film history through references, dark or satirical undertones, and crisp dialogue.

== History ==
In 1994, Pulp Fiction, the second feature by Tarantino, was his breakout success, and it had an impact on 1990s cinema. It helped draw wider attention to independent and international films while a wave of imitators followed. As audiences were attracted to this type of storytelling, studios started to produce similar movies as well. Many of these imitations leaned heavily on violence and pop culture nods but many lacked the visual style and distinctive dialogue that defined Tarantino's work. At the same time, the film's success opened doors for more unconventional projects movies that studios might have previously overlooked but now saw as potentially profitable.

On the phenomenon, Tarantino said "I'm flattered by all those guys, but every time people start writing me off because of them, I come up with a new movie, and they go, 'Oh, that's how it's supposed to sound.' A case can be made that I re-created the gangster film and set forth the next higher subgenre that other directors followed, and there were some good films that came out." Tarantino considered it a 90s phenomenon, particularly with The Usual Suspects, Eight Heads in a Duffel Bag, and Two Days in the Valley. Love and a .45 was his favorite, with him describing it as "very close to True Romance, Natural Born Killers, and Reservoir Dogs all combined." He also praised Lucky Number Slevin and Too Many Ways to Be No. 1, while The Usual Suspects was his least favorite.

In 2018, the Oxford Dictionary of English added Tarantinoesque to their repertoire, describing the word as "resembling or imitative of the films of Quentin Tarantino; characteristic or reminiscent of these films. Tarantino's films are typically characterized by graphic and stylized violence, non-linear storylines, cineliterate references, satirical themes, and sharp dialogue."

== Partial list of Tarantinoesque films ==
- 8 Heads in a Duffel Bag (1997)
- Americana (2023)
- Bad Times at the El Royale (2018)
- Boat Story (2023)
- Flypaper (1998)
- Revengeance (2016)
- Freeway (1996)
- Get Shorty (1995)
- Go (1999)
- Grosse Pointe Blank (1997)
- Keys to Tulsa (1997)
- Lock, Stock and Two Smoking Barrels (1998)
- London Calling (2025)
- Love and a .45 (1994)
- Lucky Number Slevin (2006)
- Mayhem (2017)
- Suicide Kings (1997)
- The Boondock Saints (1999)
- The Usual Suspects (1995)
- The Way of the Gun (2000)
- They Will Kill You (2026)
- Things to Do in Denver When You're Dead (1995)
- Too Many Ways to Be No. 1 (1997)
- Truth or Consequences, N.M (1997)
- Two Days in the Valley (1996)
- U-Turn (1997)

== See also ==
- List of works by Quentin Tarantino
