= Judy (soundtrack) =

Soundtrack album by Renée Zellweger
- Released: September 27, 2019
- Genre: Soundtrack
- Length: 39:31
- Label: Decca

Singles from Judy
- 1. "Over the Rainbow" Released: August 20, 2019; 2. "Get Happy" Released: September 24, 2019

Judy is a soundtrack by Renée Zellweger for the film of the same name. It was released on September 28, 2019, by Decca Records. The album features songs performed by Zellweger in character as Judy Garland from the film along with duets with Sam Smith and Rufus Wainwright. The album received a nomination for the Grammy Award for Best Traditional Pop Vocal Album, with Zellweger as the recipient.

== Track listing ==
No.	Title	Writer(s)	Length
1.	"By Myself"	Arthur Schwartz; Howard Dietz	4:14
2.	"Get Happy" (with Sam Smith)	Harold Arlen; Ted Koehler	2:52
3.	"For Once in My Life"	Ron Miller; Orlando Murden	3:00
4.	"Zing Went the Strings"	James F. Hanley	3:22
5.	"You Made Me Love You"	James V. Monaco; Joseph McCarthy	2:29
6.	"Talk of the Town"		3:42
7.	"Come Rain or Come Shine"	Arlen; Johnny Mercer	3:44
8.	"Have Yourself a Merry Little Christmas" (with Rufus Wainwright)	Hugh Martin; Ralph Blane	2:58
9.	"The Trolley Song"	Martin; Blane	2:29
10.	"The Man That Got Away"	Arlen; Ira Gershwin	4:21
11.	"San Francisco"	Bronislaw Kaper; Walter Jurmann; Gus Kahn	2:45
12.	"Over the Rainbow"	Arlen; Yip Harburg	3:35
Total length:			39:31

== Charts ==
Chart (2019)	Peak position
Scottish Albums (OCC)	35
