= Nurse Betty =

2000 American black comedy film

- Theatrical release poster
- Directed by: Neil LaBute
- Screenplay by: John C. Richards; James Flamberg
- Story by: John C. Richards
- Produced by: Steve Golin; Gail Mutrux
- Starring: Morgan Freeman; Renée Zellweger; Chris Rock; Greg Kinnear; Aaron Eckhart; Crispin Glover; Pruitt Taylor Vince
- Cinematography: Jean-Yves Escoffier
- Edited by: Joel Plotch; Steven Weisberg
- Music by: Rolfe Kent
- Production companies: Gramercy Pictures; PolyGram Filmed Entertainment (uncredited); Intermedia; Pacifica Film; Propaganda Films; ab'-strakt pictures
- Distributed by: USA Films (United States); Summit Entertainment (International)
- Release dates: May 11, 2000 (Cannes); September 8, 2000
- Running time: 105 minutes
- Country: United States
- Language: English
- Budget: $25 million
- Box office: $29.4 million

Nurse Betty is a 2000 American black comedy film directed by Neil LaBute and starring Renée Zellweger as the title character, a small town, Kansas waitress who suffers a nervous breakdown after witnessing her husband's torture murder, and starts obsessively pursuing her favorite television soap opera character (Greg Kinnear), while in a fugue state. Morgan Freeman and Chris Rock play the hitmen who killed her husband and subsequently pursue her to Los Angeles.

The film premiered at the 2000 Cannes Film Festival on May 11, 2000. The film was released on September 8, 2000 by USA Films in the United States, with Summit Entertainment releasing in other territories. The film won the Cannes Film Festival Award for Best Screenplay. For her performance, Zellweger won the Golden Globe Award for Best Actress – Motion Picture Musical or Comedy. The film was also a commercial success.

== Plot ==
In the small Kansas town of Fair Oaks, diner waitress Betty Sizemore is a fan of the soap opera A Reason to Love. She has no idea that her husband Del, a car salesman, is having a sexual affair with another woman, his secretary. She also doesn't know that her husband supplements his income by selling drugs. When Betty calls to ask about borrowing a Buick LeSabre for her birthday, Del tells her to take a different car. She manages to get the Buick's key and drives off, unaware that a large stash of drugs is hidden in the trunk. Two hitmen, Charlie and Wesley, come to Betty and Del's house. Charlie threatens to scalp Del if he doesn't reveal where the drugs are, and Del reveals that he has hidden the drugs in the trunk of a Buick; Wesley then scalps Del after misunderstanding Charlie's silent communication. The appalled Charlie shoots Del dead. Betty witnesses the murder and enters a fugue state, assuming the identity of a character in A Reason to Love who is a nurse.

That evening, Sheriff Eldon Ballard, local reporter Roy Ostery, and several policemen examine the crime scene while Betty calmly packs a suitcase. She seems nonchalant about the murder, even with the investigation going on right in her house. At the police station, a psychiatrist examines her. Betty spends the night at her friend's house, sleeping in a child's bedroom. In the middle of the night, she gets into the LeSabre and drives off. She stops at a bar in Williams, Arizona, where the bartender talks about her vacation in Rome; Betty tells her that she was once engaged to a famous surgeon (describing the lead character from A Reason to Love). Meanwhile, the two hitmen are in pursuit, having learned that Betty saw Del's killing, and having realized that she probably has the car with the drugs. As they search, Charlie's heart begins to soften towards Betty, to Wesley's consternation.

In Los Angeles, Betty tries to get a job as a nurse while looking for her long-lost "ex-fiancé". She is turned down because she has no resume or references, but when she saves a young shooting victim's life with a technique she learned from the show, the hospital offers her a job in the pharmacy but forbids her to touch any more patients. Despite her position, Betty becomes popular with patients and their families. She ends up living with Rosa, the older sister of the young man she helped earlier, in gratitude for saving his life. Rosa is also a legal secretary and offers to help Betty find her surgeon boyfriend. She learns from a colleague that "David" is a soap opera character, and goes to the pharmacy window to confront Betty. Thinking her friend is jealous, Betty is impervious to the revelation.

Betty's lawyer supplies tickets to a charity function where George McCord, the actor portraying David, will be appearing. Betty meets George at the function. George is inclined to dismiss her as an over-imaginative fan, but something about her compels him to talk to her. He begins to think that Betty is an actress determined to get a part in A Reason to Love, so he decides to play along. After three hours of her "staying in character", he takes her home. George begins falling in love with Betty, and he and his producer decide to bring her onto the show as a new character: Nurse Betty. When Betty arrives on set, she falls out of her fantasy world and into real life. After two failed takes, she realizes that she is on a set and that the people she thought were real are just characters. George confronts her and Betty walks out.

Back at Rosa's house, Betty is telling her roommate what happened when the two hitmen walk in and take Betty and Rosa hostage at gunpoint. Charlie and Wesley tie up the two women and are subsequently interrupted by Roy and Sheriff Ballard, who have also tracked down Betty. A standoff ensues until Ballard pulls a gun from an ankle holster and shoots Wesley dead, who is revealed to be Charlie's son. Charlie decides not to kill Betty and commits suicide in the bathroom. George apologizes to Betty and offers her a job on the show, while Roy and Rosa become a couple. Betty appears in 63 episodes of A Reason to Love and takes a vacation in Rome. Betty later plans to pursue nursing as a career.

== Cast ==
- Morgan Freeman as Charlie
- Renée Zellweger as Betty Sizemore
- Chris Rock as Wesley
- Greg Kinnear as George McCord (Dr. David Ravell)
- Aaron Eckhart as Del Sizemore
- Tia Texada as Rosa Hernandez
- Crispin Glover as Roy Ostery
- Pruitt Taylor Vince as Sheriff Eldon Ballard
- Allison Janney as Lyla Branch
- Kathleen Wilhoite as Sue Ann Rogers
- Elizabeth Mitchell as Chloe Jensen
- Harriet Sansom Harris as Ellen
- Sheila Kelley as Joyce
- Sung-Hi Lee as Jasmine
- Steven Gilborn as Blake
- Christopher McDonald (deleted scene) as Duane Cooley

== Reception ==
=== Critical reception ===
Nurse Betty received very positive reviews from critics and has a rating of 83% on Rotten Tomatoes based on 131 reviews with an average rating of 7.2/10. The consensus states "Quirky in the best sense of the word, Nurse Betty finds director Neil LaBute corralling a talented cast in service of a sharp, imaginative script." On Metacritic, the film has a weighted average score of 69 out of 100, based on 34 critics, indicating "generally favorable reviews".

Roger Ebert awarded the film three stars out of four, praising its depth but noting its emotional ambiguity: "Nurse Betty is one of those films where you don't know whether to laugh or cringe, and find yourself doing both."

=== Box office ===
The film opened at #2 at the North American box office making $7.1 million USD in its opening weekend, behind The Watcher. The film eventually grossed $29.4 million at the US box office before generating more than $33 million from US home video rental, and turning a substantial profit.

=== Awards ===
- American Comedy Awards:
  - Funniest Actress in a Motion Picture (Renée Zellweger)
- Black Reel Awards:
  - Best Actor (Morgan Freeman)
  - Best Supporting Actor (Chris Rock)
- British Independent Film Awards:
  - Best Foreign Film – English Language
- Cannes Film Festival:
  - Best Screenplay (James Flamberg and John C. Richards)
- Edgar Allan Poe Awards:
  - Best Motion Picture
- Golden Globe Awards:
  - Best Actress – Motion Picture Musical or Comedy (Renée Zellweger)
- Image Awards:
  - Outstanding Supporting Actor in a Motion Picture (Morgan Freeman)
- London Film Critics:
  - Actress of the Year (Renée Zellweger)
- Satellite Awards:
  - Best Actress – Motion Picture Musical or Comedy (Renée Zellweger)
  - Best Picture – Musical or Comedy
  - Best Supporting Actor – Musical or Comedy (Morgan Freeman)
