= Judy (film) =

2019 film by Rupert Goold

- Theatrical release poster
- Directed by: Rupert Goold
- Screenplay by: Tom Edge
- Based on: End of the Rainbow by Peter Quilter
- Produced by: David Livingstone
- Starring: Renée Zellweger; Finn Wittrock; Jessie Buckley; Rufus Sewell; Michael Gambon
- Cinematography: Ole Bratt Birkeland
- Edited by: Melanie Oliver
- Music by: Gabriel Yared
- Production companies: Pathé; BBC Films; Ingenious Media; Calamity Films
- Distributed by: 20th Century Fox (United Kingdom); Pathé Distribution (France and Switzerland); LD Entertainment; Roadside Attractions (United States)
- Release dates: 30 August 2019 (Telluride); 27 September 2019 (United States); 2 October 2019 (United Kingdom)
- Running time: 118 minutes
- Countries: United Kingdom; United States; France
- Language: English
- Budget: $10 million
- Box office: $46 million

Judy is a 2019 biographical drama film based on the life of American entertainer Judy Garland. Directed by Rupert Goold, it is an adaptation of the Olivier- and Tony-nominated West End and Broadway play End of the Rainbow by Peter Quilter. The film stars Renée Zellweger, Jessie Buckley, Finn Wittrock, Rufus Sewell, and Michael Gambon.

The film follows Garland's career during the last year of her life, when she relocated her stage career to England, coupled with flashbacks of her childhood, most prominently the shooting of her part as Dorothy Gale in The Wizard of Oz (1939), her most famous film role. After some initial success in a run of sell-out concerts at the Talk of the Town in London, her efforts eventually stop making progress and even start to worsen as her health deteriorates.

Judy premiered at the 46th Telluride Film Festival on 30 August 2019, and was released in the United States on 27 September 2019, and in the United Kingdom on 2 October 2019. The film received generally positive reviews, with Zellweger's performance garnering widespread acclaim. For her portrayal of Garland, Zellweger won the Academy Award for Best Actress, as well as the Golden Globe Award, SAG Award, BAFTA Award and Critics' Choice Movie Award.

== Plot ==
In 1939, 16-year-old Judy Garland is told by Metro-Goldwyn-Mayer studio head Louis B. Mayer on the set of The Wizard of Oz, that she has a gift other girls do not. Her singing talent is nearly unmatched while she is able to surpass the success of Shirley Temple as a Hollywood child star. As her career takes off, Judy is forced by a ruthless studio minder to take amphetamines against her will and one such instance occurs during her date with Mickey Rooney. She is even denied permission to sleep due to her demanding schedule. When Judy protests that she is exhausted, Mayer emotionally and physically intimidates her to keep her in line.

In her forties, Judy has been performing with Lorna and Joey, her two children from her marriage to Sidney Luft, her third husband. Later, the trio try to check into their hotel but are turned away for previous nonpayment. Because of this, Judy is forced to return home to Sidney, who has since divorced her.

At a party, Judy meets nightclub owner Mickey Deans and they become friends. In 1968, she is told by her agent that she has an opportunity for a series of engagements in England, but that the U.S. reception to her has cooled due to her unreliability and moodiness. She decides to embark for England, leaving Lorna and Joey with Sidney, while promising that she will make enough money to buy a house for the three of them.

While in England, substance abuse keeps Judy from performing reliably. She also has an onstage flashback to Mayer molesting her by luring her to a secluded place and rubbing her chest. She is late to her London premiere and assistants are called upon to check on her health and fix her make-up. The fans are enthusiastic and her performance is excellent.

Judy meets Dan and Stan, two adoring gay fans, at the stage door on her way out and joins them for a late-night snack at their flat. They bond over their difficulties, and she sings "Get Happy" while Dan plays the piano. Deans comes to London on a surprise visit, which cheers her up. She still has trouble making her stage performances on time because of substance abuse and anxiety.

Her sponsoring British agent has Judy examined by a voice specialist. She says she had a tracheotomy following a suicide attempt two years earlier, which weakened her voice. The doctor diagnoses physical and mental exhaustion, which requires rest for recovery. Her relationship with Deans is a support to her personal life, and they marry, making him her fifth husband.

She still thinks about Lorna and Joey and suffers from being separated from them. They, however, are happy in school in California. Meanwhile, Mickey fails to secure a lucrative restaurant franchise deal for Judy, which means she must stay in England to make ends meet. At her next performance, Judy is heckled when she shows up drunk and passes out onstage. Her singing engagement is terminated but she returns for a final night on stage, where she asks to perform one last song. She breaks down while singing "Over the Rainbow" but recovers with the encouragement of supportive fans and is able to complete the performance. She asks, "You won't forget me, will you?" to the audience, who applaud before she ends her performance by saying, "Promise you won't." Judy dies six months later, in summer 1969, aged 47.

== Cast ==
- Renée Zellweger as Judy Garland
  - Darci Shaw as young Judy
- Jessie Buckley as Rosalyn Wilder
- Finn Wittrock as Mickey Deans, Judy's 5th husband
- Rufus Sewell as Sidney Luft, Judy's 3rd husband
- Michael Gambon as Bernard Delfont
- Royce Pierreson as Burt Rhodes
- Andy Nyman as Dan
- Daniel Cerqueira as Stan
- Gemma-Leah Devereux as Liza Minnelli, Judy's daughter with 2nd husband Vincente Minnelli
- Bella Ramsey as Lorna Luft, Judy & Sidney's daughter
- Lewin Lloyd as Joey Luft, Judy & Sidney's son
- Gus Barry as Mickey Rooney, Judy's boyfriend
- Richard Cordery as Louis B. Mayer
- Phil Dunster as Ben
- Arthur McBain as Askith
- John Dagleish as Lonnie Donegan
- David Rubin as Noel
- Fenella Woolgar as Margaret Hamilton

== Production ==
Principal photography began on 19 March 2018, in London. Filming locations included West London Film Studios. Pinewood Studios, Hackney Empire and Tring Park School for the Performing Arts. According to the film's costume designer Jany Temime, the production budget was $10 million and shot for seven weeks.

=== Music ===
The soundtrack for the film was released on 28 September 2019 by Decca Records. It features twelve of Garland's most popular tracks performed by Zellweger, including several that were featured in the movie, as well as duets with Sam Smith and Rufus Wainwright.

== Release ==
The film had its world premiere at the Telluride Film Festival on 30 August 2019. It also screened at the Toronto International Film Festival on 10 September 2019. It was theatrically released in the United States on 27 September 2019, by Roadside Attractions and LD Entertainment, and in the United Kingdom on 2 October 2019, by 20th Century Fox, Pathé's British Distributor.

== Reception ==
=== Box office ===
The film grossed $24.3 million in the United States and Canada, and $18.9 million in other territories, for a worldwide total of $43.2 million.

The film made $2.9 million in its opening weekend, from 461 theatres, finishing seventh at the box office; 60% of its audiences was female, while 79% were over the age of 35. It expanded to 1,458 theatres the following weekend and made $4.6 million, finishing sixth, before making $3.2 million in its third weekend, returning to seventh place.

=== Critical response ===
On review aggregator Rotten Tomatoes, the film holds an approval rating of 82% based on 339 reviews, with an average rating of 7/10. The website's consensus reads, "Led by a deeply committed performance from Renée Zellweger, Judy captures the waning days of a beloved performer with clear-eyed compassion." On Metacritic, it has a weighted average score of 66 out of 100, based on 46 critics, indicating "generally favorable" reviews. Audiences polled by CinemaScore gave it an average grade of "A−" on an A+ to F scale.

Zellweger garnered much critical acclaim for her performance in the title role, with several critics labelling her a frontrunner to win the Academy Award for Best Actress, which she would later go on to win. Peter Travers of Rolling Stone called her portrayal of Garland "the performance of the year", while Zoe Gahan of Vanity Fair wrote, "a stellar stage-stomping performance. It is hard to tell where Garland stops and Zellweger starts... Go and see this film. Laugh and weep, bawl your eyes out—she deserves every tear." Eric Kohn of IndieWire gave the film a "C", stating that "Zellweger inhabits the role of the jaded, soul-searching musical icon reasonably well within a dreary and unremarkable saga that finds her grappling with her past, contending with pill-popping addictions and a broken family. It's a familiar story that Judy struggles to freshen up, at least until Zellweger takes the mic."

Monica Castillo of RogerEbert.com gave the film two out of four stars; though she praised how it contextualized Garland's abusive childhood, she criticized Goold's direction and Zellweger's performance, stating that "there are spots in the movie where Zellweger's affected manners become too distracting and overshadow everything else around her...Try as she might, Zellweger's Judy never goes beyond an impression of the multi-talented artist; her all-caps version of acting fails to allow the role to feel natural."

== Accolades ==
Award	Date of ceremony	Category	Recipient(s)	Result	Ref.
AACTA Awards	3 January 2020	Best International Actress	Renée Zellweger	Nominated	
AARP's Movies For Grownups Awards	11 January 2020	Best Actress	Renée Zellweger	Won	
AARP's Movies For Grownups Awards	11 January 2020	Best Time Capsule	Judy	Nominated	
Academy Awards	9 February 2020	Best Actress	Renée Zellweger	Won	
Academy Awards	9 February 2020	Best Makeup and Hairstyling	Jeremy Woodhead	Nominated	
British Academy Film Awards	2 February 2020	Best Actress in a Leading Role	Renée Zellweger	Won	
British Academy Film Awards	2 February 2020	Best Costume Design	Jany Temime	Nominated	
British Academy Film Awards	2 February 2020	Best Makeup and Hair	Jeremy Woodhead	Nominated	
British Independent Film Awards	1 December 2019	Best Actress	Renée Zellweger	Won	
British Independent Film Awards	1 December 2019	Best Cinematography	Ole Bratt Birkeland	Nominated	
British Independent Film Awards	1 December 2019	Best Costume Design	Jany Temime	Nominated	
British Independent Film Awards	1 December 2019	Best Make Up & Hair Design	Jeremy Woodhead	Won	
British Independent Film Awards	1 December 2019	Best Production Design	Kave Quinn	Nominated	
Casting Society of America	30 January 2020	Studio or Independent – Drama	Fiona Weir and Alice Searby	Nominated	
Critics' Choice Movie Awards	12 January 2020	Best Actress	Renée Zellweger	Won	
Critics' Choice Movie Awards	12 January 2020	Best Hair and Makeup	Judy	Nominated	
Detroit Film Critics Society	9 December 2019	Best Actress	Renée Zellweger	Nominated	
Detroit Film Critics Society	9 December 2019	Breakthrough Performance	Jessie Buckley	Nominated	
GLAAD Media Awards	19 March 2020	Outstanding Film – Wide Release	Judy	Nominated	
Golden Globe Awards	5 January 2020	Best Actress in a Motion Picture – Drama	Renée Zellweger	Won	
Grammy Awards	14 March 2021	Best Traditional Pop Vocal Album	Judy – Renée Zellweger	Nominated	
Hollywood Critics Association	9 January 2020	Best Actress	Renée Zellweger	Nominated	
Hollywood Critics Association	9 January 2020	Best Hair and Makeup	Judy	Nominated	
Hollywood Film Awards	3 November 2019	Hollywood Actress Award	Renée Zellweger	Won	
Houston Film Critics Society	2 January 2020	Best Actress	Renée Zellweger	Won	
Independent Spirit Awards	8 February 2020	Best Female Lead	Renée Zellweger	Won	
London Film Critics Circle	30 January 2020	Actress of the Year	Renée Zellweger	Won	
National Board of Review	8 January 2020	Top 10 Independent Films	Judy	Won	
National Board of Review	8 January 2020	Best Actress	Renée Zellweger	Won	
Palm Springs International Film Festival	2 January 2020	Desert Palm Achievement Award	Renée Zellweger	Won	
San Diego Film Critics Society	9 December 2019	Best Actress	Renée Zellweger	Runner-up	
San Diego Film Critics Society	9 December 2019	Breakthrough Artist	Jessie Buckley	Nominated	
Santa Barbara International Film Festival	16 January 2020	American Riviera Award	Renée Zellweger	Won	
Satellite Awards	19 December 2019	Best Actress – Motion Picture Drama	Renée Zellweger	Nominated	
Satellite Awards	19 December 2019	Best Costume Design	Jany Temime	Nominated	
Screen Actors Guild Awards	19 January 2020	Outstanding Performance by a Female Actor in a Leading Role	Renée Zellweger	Won	
St. Louis Film Critics Association	15 December 2019	Best Actress	Renée Zellweger	Nominated	
Washington D.C. Area Film Critics Association	8 December 2019	Best Actress	Renée Zellweger	Nominated	
