= Love and a .45 =

- Theatrical release poster
- Directed by: C.M. Talkington
- Written by: C.M. Talkington
- Produced by: Darin Scott
- Starring: Gil Bellows; Renée Zellweger; Rory Cochrane
- Cinematography: Tom Richmond
- Edited by: Bob Ducsay
- Music by: Tom Verlaine; The Reverend Horton Heat
- Production company: Trimark Pictures
- Distributed by: Trimark Pictures
- Release date: November 23, 1994
- Running time: 102 minutes
- Country: United States
- Language: English
- Box office: $35,200

Love and a .45 is a 1994 American independent black comedy romantic crime film written and directed by C.M. Talkington, starring Gil Bellows and Renée Zellweger. It co-stars Rory Cochrane, Jeffrey Combs, Jace Alexander, Michael Bowen, Jack Nance, Ann Wedgeworth, Peter Fonda, and Wiley Wiggins.

Set in rural Texas, the film follows a criminal and his girlfriend who plan a convenience store robbery to pay off debts to local gangsters. A friend of the criminal ropes him into a bigger heist that goes wrong, leading the couple to flee to Mexico while becoming media sensations for their crime spree.

Zellweger shared that she first learned about the project while working on Texas Chainsaw Massacre 4, when Matthew McConaughey was being considered for a role in the film. After McConaughey set the script aside, Zellweger picked it up, was captivated by the character Starlene, expressed interest in the part which led to her casting. Bellows, who was cast as Watty, expressed his admiration for the character, despite Watty's profession.

While Gil Bellows, Renée Zellweger, Rory Cochrane, and the rest of the cast received high praise for their performances, the film itself received mixed to positive reviews. Bellows brought depth and charm to Watty, making him both engaging and sympathetic, while Zellweger added raw intensity to her role. Cochrane’s wild portrayal of Billy injected chaotic energy into the film. Despite some criticism of the visual style and familiar story elements, the film was applauded for its fast pace, witty dialogue, and energetic action sequences, which kept it engaging and entertaining throughout.

Love and a .45 was categorized among the wave of "Tarantino-esque" films that followed the style of director Quentin Tarantino, who had a recent breakthrough. Tarantino himself considers it the best film of that wave.

== Plot ==
A young couple in love — Watty Watts (Bellows) and Starlene (Zellweger) — are planning a convenience store robbery. The next day, they are paid a visit by Creepy Cody (Alexander) and Dinosaur Bob (Combs), collectors for a local mobster whom Watty has borrowed money from to buy an engagement ring for Starlene. They inform Watty that he must get the money very soon. This is followed by a visit by Watts' drug-addicted former prison buddy, Billy Mack Black (Cochrane), who has a plan for a big score. Against the wishes of Starlene, Watty goes along with the plot and the robbery turns deadly when Billy shoots and kills the stoned clerk.

Following the murder, Billy pulls his gun on Watty and forces him to go to a restaurant to eat breakfast, where Billy pulls his gun on Watty again. Fearing for his life, Watty attacks Billy with a fork and escapes. He then returns to his trailer and Starlene. He asks her to marry him and tells her they have to flee to Mexico. They are then paid a visit by two police officers, who try to kill them as revenge for the murder and robbery. Starlene manages to shoot one of the officers, who accidentally shoots the other one, and the couple escape.

They then make their way toward Mexico pursued by Billy Mack, Bob and Creepy and the police. The two are romanticized in the crime-obsessed media and become celebrities. On the way they stop in to see Starlene's parents, Thaylene (Wedgeworth) and Vergil (Fonda), who are later found by Billy, Bob and Creepy, leading to a violent showdown in which all are killed except Billy.

Billy catches up with Watty and Starlene and the three of them cross into Mexico together. There the three engage in a showdown in which Starlene eventually kills Billy by injecting him with an overdose of high-powered speed.

The two lovers take some liquid LSD given to them by Starlene's father and drive off into the sunset to start a new life.

== Cast ==
- Gil Bellows as Watty Watts
- Renée Zellweger as Starlene Cheatham
- Rory Cochrane as Billy Mack Black
- Jeffrey Combs as Bob "Dinosaur Bob"
- Jace Alexander as Cody "Creepy Cody"
- Michael Bowen as Ranger X
- Jack Nance as Justice Thurman
- Ann Wedgeworth as Thaylene Cheatham
- Peter Fonda as Vergil Cheatham
- Wiley Wiggins as Young Clerk

== Production ==
Zellweger explained that she found out about the project while Matthew McConaughey was being considered for the role, while filming Texas Chainsaw Massacre 4. According her McConaughey left the script aside, she picked it up, read it and fell in love with the character of Starlene. It led her to start crashing readings of the script and director Talkington hired her for the part.

Talkington explained that the company making the film was reluctant to hire her and said “I had to threaten to walk off the movie to get the company to cast Renee. So it was a big risk — I mean, they were like, ‘We’re not gonna cast her,’ and I’m like, ‘You’re gonna cast her or we’re walking off the movie.’ So we kind of won and they cast her."

Bellows who was cast as Watty said "I loved him from the moment I read the first page of the script, in spite of his profession, he is really a noble character. "I think he does know the difference between good and bad, right and wrong. By and large his justifications are those I would embrace in my own life - other than armed robbery."

== Reception ==
Kevin Thomas of the Los Angeles Times liked it and said it was "fast, violent and funny." He added that "C.M. Talkington's Love and a .45 sends up the gun-toting lovers-on-the-run genre with a gleeful wit, nonstop energy and a refreshing honesty." His final consensus is the film "is a comic book, not to be taken seriously, yet Talkington's people are real, well-drawn, even though they're caricatures. Talkington not only has style but also a terrific way with actors, giving them the confidence to go over the top while having fun doing so".

Neil Davidson in his article published in the Red Deer Advocate explained he liked it. He said that Watty is "played to perfection by Bellows." Davidson thinks the film is "quite a journey, wonderfully written and painstakingly filmed by the 27-year-old director from Texas."

Todd McCarthy of Variety found it uneven. Of the pros he said the "pic is striking for seeming to be not only about, but actually of, the sleazy criminal milieu it depicts. Dialogue is lively and performances mostly sharp, including Bellows as the philosophical small-time criminal and Jeffrey Combs and Jace Alexander as the maniacal hit men. Model Zelwegger is pretty much standard-issue leading lady for this sort of thing. By far the highlight is Cochrane’s crazed performance as the scumbag Billy." He felt that what holds the film back is the "addition to its less than compelling schema and central relationship, is its utter lack of visual style. At a time when most pictures feature form almost at the expense of content, this one has an utterly undesigned look that’s virtually distinctive in its blandness. Climax, which also reflects the influence of Tarantino by way of Hong Kong actioners, is rather blah."

Marc Savlov of The Austin Chronicle gave it two star and a half out of five. He felt the movie was affected by the poor timing with the release of Natural Born Killers and Kalifornia. He also felt that there was clear influence from Sugarland Express, Thelma and Louise, and Reservoir Dogs. Hence he concluded "there's not a whole lot here we haven't seen before." As a final consensus and on the positive side he said "Talkington keeps the film moving at roughly the speed of Speed, bathing the shots with eerie gels and utilizing various skewed camera angles to keep things interesting. Bellows, Zellweger, and Cochrane are all excellent in their roles (particularly Bellows), though Zellweger's character -- all squeals and caged sexuality -- seems a bit too close to Juliette Lewis' Mallory Knox (of Natural Born Killers) to be as fresh as it should be. (And, since Love & a .45 wrapped long before Stone's film was released, it seems that's just a case of lousy timing.) Gory, spastic fun, Love & a .45 is a broken roller-coaster ride of Texas trouble. It's not anything you haven't seen before, but it might remind you why you liked those other movies in the first place."

On the review aggregator website Rotten Tomatoes, 71% of 7 critics' reviews are positive. Metacritic, which uses a weighted average, assigned the film a score of 49 out of 100, based on 11 critics, indicating "mixed or average" reviews.

While Talkington explained that he didn’t draw any inspiration from director Quentin Tarantino, who had recently risen to fame, and noted that he wrote the first draft in the early 1990s, Love and a .45 was still labeled as part of the wave of "Tarantino-esque" films that followed. Among these so-called "Tarantino-esque" films, Tarantino himself considered Love and a .45 the best, stating, "Love and a .45 was really good. It was very close to True Romance, Natural Born Killers, and Reservoir Dogs all combined. That might be the only film that guy ever made, but he had a gift for really funny dialogue." On Tarantino's respect of the film Talkington said that if he "wants to think that I’m his greatest imitator, then I’m honored because that’s a great compliment from him. The fact that he keeps talking about my film that I made 21 years ago in major interviews blows my mind! I mean would it blow your mind? I mean 20 years later to still remember it? I mean it blows my mind. And it means a lot to me."

== Accolades ==
- Nominated: Independent Spirit Award for Best Actress in a film debut (Renée Zellweger)

== See also ==
- Tarantinoesque film
