= Same Kind of Different as Me =

2006 book by Ron Hall, Denver Moore, and Lynn Vincent

Same Kind of Different As Me: A Modern-Day Slave, an International Art Dealer, and the Unlikely Woman Who Bound Them Together
- Author: Ron Hall, Denver Moore, Lynn Vincent
- Publication date: June 2006

Same Kind of Different As Me: A Modern-Day Slave, an International Art Dealer, and the Unlikely Woman Who Bound Them Together, published in June 2006, is a book co-written by Ron Hall and Denver Moore, with Lynn Vincent, telling about Hall's and Moore's intersecting life journeys. It was published by Thomas Nelson. Moore grew up as a sharecropper on a plantation in Red River Parish, Louisiana. He lived through years of hardship and homelessness but changed both his and others' lives after meeting Hall, who was volunteering at a shelter.

== Plot synopsis ==
Ron Hall is a rich international art dealer in Texas. Although not enjoying the same paycheck size as that of his clients', he is invited into their sphere. He and his wife Deborah have two children, Reagen and Carson—the first of which, once she hit high school, "shunned anything that smacked of wealth, and yearned to be a freedom fighter in South Africa." After an affair that Ron has, he and Deborah attend marriage counseling and forge a strong bond. So much so, that when Deborah decides to help out at a homeless shelter, Ron agrees to go, hopeful that Deborah will change her mind. Soon, Ron gets excited about it too—and, not without Deborah's urging, forms a friendship with Denver, a man whom all homeless people and people on the streets are terrified of. This book is a chronology of their friendship, Deborah's battle with cancer, and how the love of God is at work, changing lives.

== Popularity and reviews ==
The book was #11 on the January 9, 2009 The New York Times Best Seller list for paperback non-fiction. It has shipped a total of at least 300,000 copies.

== Characters ==
- Denver Moore, a homeless man who "by his wisdom [he] saved the city" (Ecclesiastes 9:15)
- Ron Hall, an international art dealer
- Deborah Hall, wife of Ron Hall, spiritual woman (like Proverbs 31), and minister to the homeless/poor
- Mary Ellen Davenport, friend to the Halls
- Sister Bettie, spiritual woman and minister to the homeless/poor
