= 2019 Movieguide Awards =

Annual American movie and television awards

The 2019 Movieguide Awards ceremony honored the best films and television of 2018.

== Winners and nominees ==
Winners are listed first, highlighted in boldface, and indicated with a double dagger (‡).

**Epiphany Prize for Most Inspiring Movie** - Honoring movies that are wholesome, spiritually uplifting and inspirational	**Epiphany Prize for Most Inspiring TV Program**
**I Can Only Imagine**‡; God's Not Dead: A Light in Darkness; The Grinch; Paul, Apostle of Christ; Unbroken: Path to Redemption	**When Calls the Heart: "The Greatest Christmas Blessing"**‡; Billy Graham: An Extraordinary Journey; Marvel's Agents of S.H.I.E.L.D.: Episode 5.22: "The End"; Daredevil: Episode 3.13: "A New Napkin"; Medal of Honor: Episode 4: "Hiroshi Hershey Miyamura"; Elvis Presley: The Searcher: Part I and Part II; A Shoe Addict's Christmas; Manifest: Pilot Episode
**Faith and Freedom Award for Movies** - Honoring movies that promote positive American values	**Faith and Freedom Award for TV**
**Little Pink House**‡; Ant-Man and the Wasp; Chappaquiddick; Paddington 2; Incredibles 2; Jurassic World: Fallen Kingdom	**Medal of Honor: Episode 4: "Hiroshi Hershey Miyamura"**‡; Daredevil: Episode 3.13: "A New Napkin"; Little Women; Manifest: Pilot Episode; Marvel's Agents of S.H.I.E.L.D.: Episode 5.22: "The End"
**Best Movie for Families**	**Best Movie for Mature Audiences**
**The Grinch**‡; God's Not Dead: A Light in Darkness; I Can Only Imagine; Incredibles 2; Mary Poppins Returns; Paddington 2; Paul, Apostle of Christ; Peter Rabbit; Ralph Breaks the Internet; Spider-Man: Into the Spider-Verse	**Chappaquiddick**‡; Ant-Man and the Wasp; Jurassic World: Fallen Kingdom; Little Pink House; Mission: Impossible – Fallout; A Quiet Place; Skyscraper; Solo: A Star Wars Story; Unbroken: Path to Redemption; Won't You Be My Neighbor?
**Grace Award for Most Inspiring Performance for Movies**	**Grace Award for Most Inspiring Performance for TV**
**Jim Caviezel - Paul, Apostle of Christ**‡; **James Faulkner - Paul, Apostle of Christ**‡ (Note: Jim Caviezel won the award, and shared it with James Faulkner); David A.R. White - God's Not Dead: A Light in Darkness; Dennis Quaid - I Can Only Imagine; J. Michael Finley - I Can Only Imagine; Merritt Patterson - Unbroken: Path to Redemption; Samuel Hunt - Unbroken: Path to Redemption; John Krasinski - A Quiet Place; Emily Blunt - A Quiet Place	**Jean Smart - A Shoe Addict's Christmas**‡; Emily Watson - Little Women; Henry Simmons - Marvel's Agents of S.H.I.E.L.D.: Episode 5.22: "The End"; Chloe Bennet - Marvel's Agents of S.H.I.E.L.D.: Episode 5.22: "The End"; Joanne Whalley - Daredevil: Episode 3.13: "A New Napkin"; Candace Cameron Bure - A Shoe Addict's Christmas; Lori Loughlin - When Calls the Heart: "The Greatest Christmas"
