= Akshay Khanna (British actor) =

- Education: University of Bristol
- Years active: 2020–present

Akshay Khanna is a British actor. His films include Red, White & Royal Blue and Polite Society (both 2023). On television, he is known for his roles in the BBC One series Chloe (2022), the Paramount+ series The Doll Factory (2023) and the Apple TV+ series Murderbot (2025–). He also has a voice role in the animated series Avatar: Seven Havens (2026–).

== Early life and education ==
Akshay Khanna graduated from the University of Bristol in 2018 with a Bachelor of Science in economics and management. He then completed a two-year professional acting foundational course at Bristol Old Vic Theatre School.

== Career ==
Upon completing his drama school course, Khanna appeared in the Greenwich Theatre productions of The Wolves of Willoughby Chase and The Secret Love Life of Ophelia. Khanna made his television debut in 2021 with guest appearances in episodes of the ITV crime dramas Grace and Grantchester. He also began working with Big Finish Productions on a number of Doctor Who audio dramas.

In 2022, Khanna had his first prominent television role as Anish in the BBC One and Amazon Prime thriller miniseries Chloe. He starred alongside Harry Lloyd in The Narcissist at Chichester Festival Theatre. The following year, Khanna made his feature film debut in the action comedy Polite Society as Salim and the Amazon Prime film adaptation of Red, White & Royal Blue. Also in 2023, Khanna portrayed a fictionalised version of Pre-Raphaelite painter Dante Gabriel Rossetti in the Paramount+ gothic period drama The Doll Factory.

The following year, Khanna starred as SC Zil Ahmed opposite Simone Kessell in the Stan crime drama Critical Incident, for which he put on an Australian accent. He has upcoming roles in the film Row with Sophie Skelton and Bella Dayne and the Apple TV+ series Murderbot. He voiced the character Commander Karthik in the 2026 animated series Avatar: Seven Havens.

== Filmography ==
Key
†	Denotes films that have not yet been released

=== Film ===
Year	Title	Role	Notes
2023	Polite Society	Salim	
2023	Red, White & Royal Blue	Shaan Shrivistava	Amazon film
2024	Touch	Philip	
2025	Row	Daniel	

=== Television ===
Year	Title	Role	Notes
2021	Grace	Josh Sayed	Episode: "Dead Simple"
2021	Grantchester	Josh	1 episode
2022	Chloe	Anish	Miniseries
2023	The Doll Factory	Rossetti	Main role
2024	Critical Incident	Senior Constable Zilficar 'Zil' Ahmed	Main role
2025	Andor	Selko	Episode: "Welcome to the Rebellion"
2025–present	Murderbot	Ratthi	Main role
2026–present	Avatar: Seven Havens	Karthik (voice)	Main role
2026	Number 10 †	TBA	Upcoming

=== Video games ===
Year	Title	Role	Notes
2020	Unknown 9: Awakening	Azad	
2023	Diablo IV	Additional voices	

== Stage ==
Year	Title	Role	Notes
2020	The Wolves of Willoughby Chase	James / Simon	Greenwich Theatre
2020	The Secret Love Life of Ophelia	Hamlet	Greenwich Theatre
2022	The Narcissist	Aide	Chichester Festival Theatre

== Audio ==
Year	Title	Role	Notes
2021	The Ninth Doctor Adventures: Planet of the Dead	Sacristan Hinge	Big Finish Productions
2022	Doctor Who Unbound: Time Killers	Riffort	Big Finish Productions
2023	The Eighth of March: A Ghost of Alchemy	Doctor Rushton / Officer	Big Finish Productions
2023	Rose Tyler: The Good Samaritan	Rohan	Big Finish Productions
