= I Can Only Imagine 2 =

- Theatrical release poster
- Directed by: Andrew Erwin; Brent McCorkle
- Screenplay by: Brent McCorkle
- Based on: The life story of Bart Millard
- Produced by: Cindy Bond; Kevin Downes; Bart Millard; Daryl Lefever; Joshua Walsh
- Starring: John Michael Finley; Milo Ventimiglia; Sophie Skelton; Arielle Kebbel; Sammy Dell; Trace Adkins; Dennis Quaid
- Cinematography: Johnny Derango
- Edited by: John Puckett
- Music by: Brent McCorkle
- Production companies: Kingdom Story Company; LD Entertainment; Mission Pictures International; Kevin Downes Productions
- Distributed by: Lionsgate
- Release date: February 20, 2026
- Running time: 111 minutes
- Country: United States
- Language: English
- Budget: $18 million
- Box office: $18.7 million

I Can Only Imagine 2 is a 2026 American Christian biographical drama film directed by Andrew Erwin and Brent McCorkle, from a screenplay written by McCorkle. It is the sequel to I Can Only Imagine (2018).

I Can Only Imagine 2 was released in the United States by Lionsgate on February 20, 2026. The film received mixed reviews from critics and grossed $18.7 million against an $18 million budget.

== Plot ==
MercyMe's "I Can Only Imagine" becomes the most-played song in the history of Christian radio. Bart Millard, the band's lead singer, wins for Song of the Year at the 33rd GMA Dove Awards in 2002. He is married to Shannon and has five young children. Their first son Sam suffers a seizure and is diagnosed with Type 1 diabetes.

Ten years later, Bart closely monitors his son's blood sugar and Sam resents his parents for nagging him as he teaches himself how to play the guitar. MercyMe's manager Scott "Brick" Brickell informs the band they have been unexpectedly promoted as the headliners, replacing Audio Adrenaline who has pulled out. Scott selects Tim Timmons, a Christian musician, as the tour's opening act. Married to Hilary, Tim marks his wrist with an "X" as a symbol of gratitude towards God. He carries a hymn book as he aspires to write a song similar to "It Is Well with My Soul".

Scott tells Bart to bring Sam on tour, and much to Bart's surprise, Shannon agrees. As they tour, Bart struggles to write a new hit song. Tim befriends Sam and encourages him to perform. During their first concert, Tim's opening act fails to excite the audience. Scott tells him to inject more energy and personality into his act. In response, Tim selects Sam to play guitar during his act. During their next concert, Tim tells the audience the history behind the hymn "It Is Well with My Soul", explaining that Horatio Spafford wrote it after experiencing personal tragedy.

Midway through the tour, Sam collapses from low blood sugar, prompting Bart to remove him from the tour. Sam resents his father for preventing him from achieving his dream as a musician. Their argument triggers unhappy memories of Bart's own difficulties with his father. Bart goes to a nearby recording studio where Tim confesses he has been diagnosed with cancer and that his wife is pregnant. He grieves whether he will be alive to see his child. Tim hands Bart a demo recording of a song titled "Even If", and asks Bart to write new verses for it.

Bart goes into the garage, where he remembers bonding with his father as he played guitar outside at night on antique chairs. There, Bart finds his father's guitar. Bart then joins a group therapy session. When MercyMe goes back on tour, their bus breaks down. As they wait, Bart and Sam reconcile. Bart hands Sam his father's guitar. During their next concert, the band notices Tim is not on stage for his act, and they find him unconscious aboard the tour bus. Tim is rushed to the hospital where he regains consciousness. He is disappointed when he learns Bart hasn't listened to the demo recording.

Bart listens to the recording aboard the bus and writes the requested verses. For their last stop on tour, MercyMe performs at the Red Rocks concert venue. Before Bart closes out the concert, he spots Tim and Hilary in the audience. He performs the song "Even If" in tribute to Tim, who becomes deeply moved.

The song "Even If" becomes MercyMe's most successful song since "I Can Only Imagine". Tim beats his cancer prognosis and becomes a father to four children. Sam continues his musical career and performs under the name "Sam Wesley".

== Cast ==
- John Michael Finley as Bart Millard, the lead vocalist of MercyMe
- Milo Ventimiglia as Tim Timmons
- Sophie Skelton as Shannon Street Millard, Bart's wife. Madeline Carroll portrayed her in the previous film.
- Arielle Kebbel as Hilary Larson Timmons, Tim's wife
- Trace Adkins as Scott Brickell, MercyMe's manager
- Dennis Quaid as Arthur Millard, Bart's late redeemed father
- Sammy Dell as Sam Millard, Bart & Shannon's first son
  - Jagger Amor as Young Sam Millard
- Mark Furze as Nathan Cochran, the bassist of MercyMe
- Ezra Prōch as Robbie Shaffer, the percussionist of MercyMe. Cole Marcus portrayed his in the previous film.
- Jason Burkey as Mike Scheuchzer, the guitarist of MercyMe
- Aaron Benward as Barry Graul, the other guitarist of MercyMe
- Anjelah Johnson-Reyes as Dr. Ramirez
- Island Austin as Gracie Millard, Bart & Shannon's first daughter
- Jake Johnston as Charlie Millard, Bart & Shannon's second son
- Isabella Moon as Sophie Millard, Bart & Shannon's second daughter
- Luke Vollrath as Miles Millard, Bart & Shannon's third son

== Production ==
In December 2024, it was announced that a sequel to I Can Only Imagine (2018) was in the works, directed by Andrew Erwin and Brent McCorkle, from a screenplay written by McCorkle. John Michael Finley, Trace Adkins, and Dennis Quaid would reprise their roles from the original film, while Sophie Skelton, Milo Ventimiglia, Arielle Kebbel, Joshua Bassett, and Sammy Dell joined the cast. Principal photography occurred in Nashville, Tennessee. The production budget was $18 million, more than twice as expensive as its predecessor's $7 million.

== Release ==
I Can Only Imagine 2 was released in the United States by Lionsgate on February 20, 2026. It was previously scheduled to release on March 20, 2026.

== Reception ==
On the review aggregator website Rotten Tomatoes, 60% of 25 critics' reviews are positive, with an average rating of 5.8/10. The website's consensus reads: "Lifted greatly by Milo Ventimiglia's warm, engaging performance, I Can Only Imagine 2 retreads a familiar story, yet still manages to uplift and emotionally resonate." Metacritic, which uses a weighted average, assigned the film a score of 43 out of 100, based on five critics, indicating "mixed or average" reviews. Audiences polled by CinemaScore gave I Can Only Imagine 2 a rare average grade of "A+" on an A+ to F scale, the same as its predecessor, and making I Can Only Imagine the third film series to have received an A+ CinemaScore for every installment, after the original Star Wars trilogy and The Incredibles.

The Roys Report shared the background to the story, detailing how, although the film purports to be "based on a true story", the central story of songwriter Tim Timmons writing the song at a piano in response to his cancer journey never actually happened. Instead, Christian musician Crystal Lewis wrote the song while facing personal tragedy and bankruptcy, well before she ever met Timmons.
