= Cookies and cream (disambiguation) =

Cookies and cream is an ice cream variety consisting of chocolate cookies in sweet cream or vanilla ice cream.

Cookies and cream may also refer to:

- Hershey's Cookies 'n' Creme, a candy bar
- Cookies & Cream (film), 2008
- Cookies 'n Cream (album), 2012, by Blanco and Yukmouth
- Cookie and Cream, the title characters of the video game The Adventures of Cookie & Cream
