= Uptown (2009 film) =

- Poster artwork by J. Lynn Menzel
- Directed by: Brian Ackley
- Written by: Brian Ackley; Meissa Hampton; Chris Riquinha
- Produced by: Princeton Holt; Brian Ackley
- Starring: Chris Riquinha; Meissa Hampton; Derek McAllister; Deirdre Herlihy
- Music by: Dayva Segal; Rosemary's Garden
- Production company: One Way or Another Productions
- Distributed by: Celebrity Video Distribution
- Release date: August 19, 2009 (Deep Fried Film Festival)
- Running time: 75 minutes
- Country: United States
- Language: English

Uptown is a 2009 independent drama film written and directed by Brian Ackley as his debut feature film, and the second film in the One Way or Another Productions' "Naked Series".

== Plot ==
Ben (Chris Riquinha), an aspiring filmmaker, is an unmarried man living in New York. He enjoys the single life but feels his life is missing something. He meets Isabel (Meissa Hampton), a woman unhappy in her marriage who is seeking intimacy. The bond between the two grows as they have repeated liaisons "uptown".

== Cast ==
- Chris Riquinha as Ben
- Meissa Hampton as Isabel
- Deirdre Herlihy as Beth
- Derek M. McAllister as Kasheem

== Production ==
Uptown was shot in an 8-day period with 2 cameras, using only available light and "stolen" Manhattan locations, including scenes that take place in Central Park. After a 2-week production hiatus, it was discovered that one of the cameras had been damaged, rendering everything that was shot on it as unusable. Only a few of those "lost" scenes were reshot.

Actor Chris Riquinha states that he previously worked with producer Princeton Holt on Holt's earlier film Cookies & Cream and that it was Holt who recommended him to writer/director Brian Ackley.

According to the production company, after Uptown won several festival awards, and while the film was still in the festival circuit, the film was picked up for distribution.

== Recognition ==
The film was noted for its strong performances and its cinematography, although there was no specific cinematographer credited.

=== Critical response ===
Dave Nusair of Online Film Critics Society grants that while the director "generally does a nice job of capturing the awkwardness that's part and parcel with new relationships", the film itself "has been suffused with a pervasively uneventful atmosphere that ultimately proves oppressive." He points out that the director's low-key approach "wouldn't be quite so problematic had he managed to transform either of the central characters into fully-fleshed out, thoroughly compelling figures", and that his inability to do so ensured "that it becomes impossible to work up any interest or enthusiasm in Ben and Isabel's tentative romance," due to the "relentlessly superficial nature of their conversations". And toward sound quality, Nusair makes note that the director's use of actual locations drowned out much of the dialog.

Conversely, The Independent Critic wrote that the in many such films, there is a tendency for a new filmmaker to "plunge headfirst into the depths of human emotion", but that "[w]isely, Brian Ackley avoids this potential temptation." He notes that "it is with intelligence, gentleness, grace and simplicity that Uptown explores the very real worlds" of its two protagonists, and also comments on the "similarly intelligent and patient performances from the film's leads."

James Wegg found that "Brian Ackley's first feature is a beautifully crafted, superbly acted film that explores the symptoms, realities and emotions of a doomed but unstoppable relationship." He wrote that the "opening third of the film is a masterpiece of shotmaking," and that "Riquinha and Hampton make an endearing couple who convincingly reveal themselves gradually," giving their characters an "established unshakeable credibility".

Pulpmovies offers positive commentarty on the film, writing "[n]othing is rushed, though, and the real strength of Uptown is in the utterly natural way in which the relationship between these two characters is handled. The film's writers wisely avoid excessively dramatic set-pieces preferring, instead, to allow a steadily deepening relationship between Ben and Isabel to follow its natural – and very believable – course. This approach gives the film a very gentle pace which director, Brian Ackley does a great job of handling in a nicely understated fashion." Noting that it was "very much an actors’ film", the complimented the work of the leads Chris Riquinha and Meissa Hampton, writing "[n]ot only do they bring their characters to life in a manner that is sympathetic and believable but both of their performances also feel frighteningly familiar."

Rogue Cinema wrote "Uptown is a cool little movie about men, women and the things we do when we're together. It's not a perfect movie, there are long stretches of conversation and walking that I felt a bit bored by, but overall, once you're drawn into the situation between these two star-crossed lovers, it'll have you wanting a happy ending."

Author David Schleicher wrote that the film was "well paced and nicely shot, offering that director Brian Ackley "embraces the low-budget aesthetics of indie films. There's nothing like filming in NYC, and Ackley takes full advantage of the natural setting," and that the filmmaker crafted "a meaningful and real film reminiscent of the early works of Richard Linklater and Nicole Holofcener." He praised the writing of the director and the two leads, commenting "The trio of writers have a sharp ear for realistic dialogue. There's barely a false note to be found in Uptown, and the characters feel like people you know or want to know." He summarized his review by writing "Ackley and his stars have made a compellingly real film about real people in a real predicament. Authentic and honest without resorting to gritty gimmicks or generic clichés that sometimes plague indie films of this ilk, Uptown is a true find."

Moving Arts Film Journal makes special note of the film being shot "guerrilla style with a skeleton crew in only nine days in various locations around New York City and New Jersey," and that "a sizable portion of the dialogue is improvised and Hollywood clichés are deliberately spurned in the pursuit of honesty." They compliment the results when writing, "The result is an original piece of work that portends an uncommon maturity in the filmmaker," and acknowledge that its low budget is revealed by "its production values, particularly in its cinematography and sound design," but that such may be forgiven by a viewer "as long as a human core is powerful enough to shine through," concluding "Luckily, Uptown has that core and delivers an intelligent, unique and honest narrative."

== Release ==
Uptown was released on both DVD and internet television on July 20, 2010.

=== Festivals ===
- 2009 New Filmmakers Spring Series NYC, Anthology Film Archives, Official Selection
- 2009 Blue November Film Festival, Seattle, Washington
- 2009 Outhouse Film Festival, Baton Rouge, Louisiana - Best Leading Actress (Meissa Hampton)
- 2009 Twin Rivers Media Festival, Asheville, North Carolina Honorable Mention Award
- 2009 Deep Fried Film Festival, United Kingdom, Official Selection
- Sonic Cinema "Favorite Film of 2009"
