= Row (film) =

2025 British survival thriller film

- Theatrical release poster
- Directed by: Matthew Losasso
- Written by: Matthew Losasso; Nick Skaugen
- Produced by: Nick Skaugen
- Starring: Bella Dayne; Sophie Skelton; Akshay Khanna; Nick Skaugen; Mark Strepan; Tam Dean Burn
- Cinematography: Zoran Veljkovic
- Edited by: Matthew Losasso
- Production company: Immortal Elements
- Distributed by: Kaleidoscope Film Distribution
- Release dates: 21 June 2025 (Raindance); 5 September 2025 (United Kingdom)
- Running time: 118 minutes
- Country: United Kingdom
- Language: English

Row is a 2025 British survival thriller film directed by Matthew Losasso in his feature debut, from a screenplay he co-wrote with Nick Skaugen. It stars Bella Dayne as the apparent sole survivor of a failed transatlantic rowing record attempt, with Sophie Skelton, Akshay Khanna, Skaugen, Mark Strepan and Tam Dean Burn in supporting roles. The film was shot in Caithness, Scotland.

Row had its world premiere at the 33rd Raindance Film Festival in London in June 2025, where it won the award for Best UK Feature. It was released in cinemas in the United Kingdom in September 2025 by Kaleidoscope.

== Plot ==
Megan, a member of a four-person crew attempting to set a record for rowing across the Atlantic from Newfoundland, washes ashore on the Orkney island of Hoy in a bloodstained rowing boat, the only survivor of the voyage. While recovering in hospital, she recounts the journey to DCI MacKelly, a detective investigating the disappearance of her crewmates, Lexi, Daniel and Mike. Suffering from fractured memories of the ordeal, she must piece together what happened at sea in order to prove her innocence.

== Cast ==
- Bella Dayne as Megan
- Sophie Skelton as Lexi
- Akshay Khanna as Daniel
- Nick Skaugen as Mike
- Mark Strepan as Adam
- Tam Dean Burn as DCI MacKelly

== Production ==
In August 2023, it was reported that Sophie Skelton, Bella Dayne, Akshay Khanna and Mark Strepan had been cast in Row, the feature directorial debut of Matthew Losasso, and that filming was due to begin in Scotland the following month. Skaugen produced the film with Matt Schichter as line producer, and production designer Alex Jones Nash oversaw the construction of a water tank at the ocean's edge so that scenes could be filmed to appear as if on the open sea. The production company was Immortal Elements, Skaugen's British company, and Zoran Veljkovic served as deputy producer.

Filming took place in and around Dunnet in Caithness. Interiors were shot at the House of the Northern Gate, and the boat sequences were filmed at sea off the coast and in a water tank built in a field beside the sea. Scenes set on Hoy were filmed from the Caithness coast. The shoot lasted five weeks, with some elements filmed on a sound stage. Veljkovic was the film's cinematographer. Losasso also edited the film.

== Release ==
In November 2024, Kaleidoscope Film Distribution acquired worldwide sales rights to the film ahead of the American Film Market, and also held distribution rights for the United Kingdom and Ireland. Row had its world premiere at the 33rd Raindance Film Festival on 21 June 2025, at the Vue Piccadilly cinema in London.

The film was released in cinemas in the United Kingdom on 5 September 2025. According to Box Office Mojo, it grossed $547 from five cinemas in its opening weekend. It was released on DVD and digital platforms in the UK on 29 September 2025. The film was later added to Prime Video in the United Kingdom and Ireland.

== Reception ==
On the review aggregator website Rotten Tomatoes, 58% of 12 critics' reviews are positive.

Leslie Felperin of The Guardian gave the film three out of five stars, describing it as "a twisty if murky chiller". She praised Dayne's performance and wrote that "the effects are very impressive, especially when the boat is storm tossed on waves the size of whales", but noted "a few stumbles in the motivational logic" and a "somewhat unreasonably long running time". She concluded that the film "pulls together surprisingly well, thanks in part to the ensemble's intense chemistry, striking cinematography and especially fine use of sound and score."

Jennie Kermode of Eye for Film found the story "somewhat over-egged", arguing that the number of complications meant "tension doesn't get the time to build as it should", but wrote that "the capable actors all work hard and acquit themselves well" and that "the boat makes a fascinating set and Losasso uses it well." Andrew Murray of The Upcoming wrote that the film's "ill-conceived narrative structure undermines everything that this feature gets right". Robert W. Monk of Flickering Myth called it "an effective and gripping psychological thriller". Reviewing the film at its Raindance premiere for Horror DNA, Joel Harley described it as "a valiant attempt at reinventing the 'stuck in a stupid place or things' film".

== Accolades ==
Award	Date of ceremony	Category	Recipient(s)	Result	Ref.
Raindance Film Festival	June 2025	Best UK Feature	Row	Won	
Raindance Film Festival	June 2025	Best Director of a UK Feature	Matthew Losasso	Nominated	
Raindance Film Festival	June 2025	Best Performance in a UK Feature	Bella Dayne	Nominated	
Raindance Film Festival	June 2025	Best UK Cinematography	Zoran Veljkovic	Nominated	
