= Critical Incident =

Australian television series

- Genre: Drama
- Directed by: Neil Sharma; Daniel Nettheim
- Starring: Akshay Khanna; Zoe Boe; Roxie Mohebbi; Hunter Page-Lochard; Jackson Heywood; Erik Thomson; Simone Kessell; Zindzi Okenyo; Heidi May
- Country of origin: Australia
- Original language: English
- No. of seasons: 1
- No. of episodes: 6

Production
- Executive producers: Cailah Scobie; Debbie Lee; Amanda Duthie
- Producer: Bree-Ann Sykes
- Production company: Matchbox Pictures

Original release
- Network: Stan
- Release: 12 August 2024

Critical Incident is an Australian television drama series for Stan, released on 12 August 2024. Produced by Matchbox Productions, the series follows an investigation into a critical incident when Senior Constable Zil Ahmed pursues a suspect, and in the confusion and chaos a bystander is injured. Zil must deal with the fallout and investigation into the events that transpired and those that follow.

== Plot ==
While on patrol for a suspect who injured an officer the night before, Senior Constable Zil Ahmed pursues Dalia, but in the confusion and chaos of a busy train station a bystander is injured. An investigation is launched into the "critical incident". Ahmed must deal with the fallout of the investigation with Edith Barcelos, leading the critical incident investigation. There is mounting public pressure and internal pressure for answers. Ahmed wants to pin something on Dalia. Dalia herself becomes embroiled in the underworld she was trying to escape.

== Cast ==
- Akskay Khanna as Senior Constable Zil Ahmed
- Zoe Boe as Dalia Tun
- Roxie Mohebbi as Senior Constable Sandra Ali
- Hunter Page-Lochard as Ty Egan
- Jackson Heywood as Senior Constable Greg Hall
- Jai Waetford as Hayden Broadis
- Simone Kessell as Edith Barcelos
- Erik Thomson as Trevor Latt
- Zindzi Okenyo as Ivy Tsuma
- Heidi May as Cassie Milton
- Oliver Ackland as Senior Constable Peter Emery
- Josef Ber as Hugh Horvat
- Gerry Sont as Vic Kaczmarek
- CJ Bloomfield as Christian
- Richard Brancatisano as Theo Leon

== Episodes ==
| Episode | Title | Date | Ref |
|---|---|---|---|
| 1 | Run | 12 August 2024 | |
| 2 | Strip | 12 August 2024 | |
| 3 | Resist | 12 August 2024 | |
| 4 | Vindicate | 12 August 2024 | |
| 5 | Descend | 12 August 2024 | |
| 6 | Strike | 12 August 2024 | |

== Production ==
On 13 March 2024, the series received funding from Screen Australia. It was created on written by Sarah Bassiuoni executive produced by Sheila Jayadev, both of whom are former criminal lawyers. Jayadev, who is of Indian descent, previously worked on the film Ali's Wedding (2016) and the series Stateless (2020) and House of Gods (2024), and Bassiuoni was a co-writer on House of Gods. Some recently-retired police officers acted as consultants on the series.

The series was filmed in and around the areas of Western Sydney, including Blacktown, Granville, Parramatta, and Greenacre.

== Release and reception ==
The series was released on Stan on 12 August 2024.

Reviews were mixed but mostly positive. Anthony Morris of ScreenHub gave the series four and half stars out of five and said it was "ahead of the pack", Isabella Ross, writing in Mamamia, called the series "a new crime drama that'll have you hooked immediately", and a "must-watch". She praised the casting, and said that it "finally reflect these conversations [about policing and juvenile crime] on screen — which has rarely been done before". Eliza Janssen wrote "This clear-eyed and uniquely Australian show is deft in how it visits those moments, and those helplessly human characters, that change the course of fate in between blinks". Craig Mathieson of The Sydney Morning Herald gave it 3.5 stars, writing "this six-part limited series delivers what new talent should: a sense of the here and now". Nathan Jolly wrote in Mumbrella "It's a nuanced take on what could have been a heavy-handed morality tale".

Stephen Gaunson wrote in The Conversation that Critical Incident "joins a long and impressive list of local crime dramas from streaming platforms"; however, despite its "compelling aesthetic as the backdrop... the story itself misses some key opportunities to engage in more in-depth discussions about the role (and justification) of policing in diverse communities". Luke Buckmaster of The Guardian rated the show two out of five stars, criticising the more "frustrating than suspenseful" plot.
