= Meissa Hampton =

American actress, writer and director

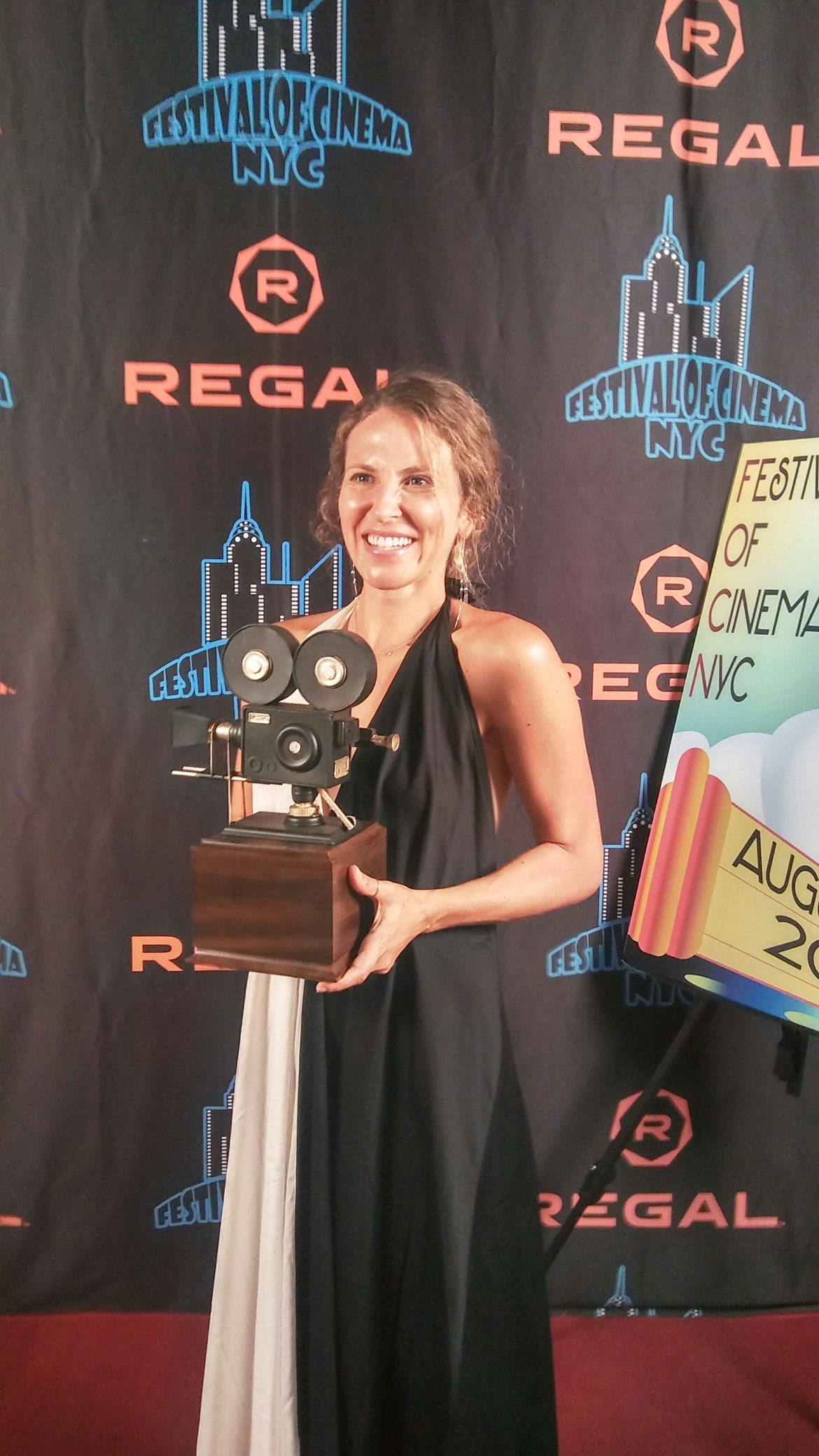
- Born: Silver Spring, Maryland, U.S.
- Education: James Madison University, Brooklyn College, Stella Adler Studio of Acting, MIT, Harvard University
- Occupations: Actress; writer; director
- Years active: 2003–present

Meissa Hampton is an American independent film actress, writer, director and activist. She has published a book of poetry is a contributing writer for the Guardian, and received a Ford Scholarship. She is currently a Resident Artist at MIT in Cambridge, Massachusetts. Her film projects have screened internationally in festivals and on television. She has received 12 Best Actress awards from domestic and international independent film festivals. She formed One Pair of Shoes Productions to direct and produce A Social Cure, a feature-length documentary about the HIV/AIDS epidemic in South Africa. In 2015 she authored a petition the Screen Actors Guild to address the gender inequities that were fueling sexual harassment and assault in the Entertainment industry. She founded the Actors Alliance for Gender Equity in Media and the website $#!% People say to actresses which provides an anonymous forum for performers to share their stories of harassment and assault in the industry. She has been cited and interviewed about her activism by The Guardian and The Independent. In 2017, after Harvey Weinstein was indicted for sexual assault and rape, she wrote an article for the Guardian.

== Early life ==
Hampton was born in Silver Spring, Maryland. She grew up in Gaithersburg and Rockville, Maryland just north of Washington DC. Her parents are Jean and Norman Hampton. Her Brother is Chris Hampton. Her half-brother is Jonathan Stipkala. She studied classical piano and dance. She was a competitive swimmer medaling at the All-Met Conference for the Maryland/Washington/Virginia region and was a downhill snow skier. She was voted "most unique" in school superlatives. She co-founded an editorial magazine (the Zoilus”) and was president of her freshman class at Gaithersburg High School. She attended James Madison University and Brooklyn College, where she studied in the Honors College under the Ford Colloquium. She studied English Literature, Film and Theater. She also won an award from the Academy of American Poets for poetry composition, performed slam poetry throughout NYC and published the poetry chapbook “One Pair of Shoes” in 2008. She lived in Paris before returning to New York to continue her theatre studies at Stella Adler Studio of Acting in NYC, then MIT and Harvard University.

== Career ==
Hampton was first seen internationally when she starred in “Should I Stay or Should I Go,” part of VH-1's "Lyrically Speaking" series of short films, which won a ProMax World Gold Award. She co-wrote the Feature Film “Uptown” with her co-star and director. Of her performance in Uptown, The Independent Critic said “Hampton is a revelation. She is stellar as the lost and lonely soul she portrays.” Her acting career has been focused on independent film. She has starred in over 30 films worldwide.

She worked briefly for New York Women in Film and Television, a non-profit organization promoting women in media with which she is still affiliate. In 2003 she joined The Screen Actors Guild and also worked as a model. She had parallel careers in film and marketing prior to 2010, founding and operating a small experiential marketing company in NYC.

She was a founding member of The Indies Lab, a collection of NYC artists. She later founded the Urban Artists collective with several colleagues.

She starred in the indie features "Things I Don't Understand," which won Best Narrative Feature at the Indie Spirit awards, and in "Looking for the Jackalope" with Michael Leydon Campbell and Stephen Root. Her subsequent projects were honored in independent film festivals in Bucharest, Montreal and throughout the U.S.

In 2012 she formed the production company “One Pair of Shoes” to direct and produce "A Social Cure," a feature-length documentary shot in South Africa. She also formed the nonprofit company “A Social Cure, Inc.” to develop outreach programs for civic-minded media.

In 2014 she was awarded an Artist's Residency at MIT in Cambridge, Massachusetts, where she worked for five years with the Open Documentary Lab, part of the MIT Media Lab.

== Activism ==
In 2014 she began to speak out about the gender inequities in the Media industry. She built a website called $#!% People say to actresses that asks performers to anonymously contribute their stories of harassment and assault in the industry.

In early 2015 Hampton authored a petition to SAG-AFTRA asking them to form a targeted committee that could review and address the gender inequities faced by its members including sexual harassment and assault.

She formed the Actors Alliance for Gender Equity in Media with the support of NYWIFT and the intent to promote gender equity issues in the industry. She was interviewed on issues of sexual harassment and assault against performers by the Guardian in an article citing what is known as the “casting couch.” She was the only actress interviewed in that article that was willing to provide her name.

The Membership First Party of SAG-AFTRA offered support to Hampton's efforts, and issued a call to action spearheaded by Rosanna Arquette that cited Hampton's petition and prior efforts

She joined the Women's Media Summit in 2018 where she was asked to head the Legal Action committee with Film Director and activist Maria Giese

== Personal life ==
Hampton lives in Brooklyn. She is unmarried and has one child and a boxer dog.

== Awards and recognitions ==
- Artist's Residency, Massachusett's Institute for Technology (MIT)
- Ford Scholarship
- Tuch Award for Scholastic achievement
- Academy of American Poets
- Best Lead Actress – Festival of Cinema, NYC 2019
- Best Lead Actress – Austin Independent Film Festival 2018
- Best Lead Actress Nomination – Bucharest ShortCut Cinefest 2018
- Best Supporting Actress – First Run Film Festival
- Lead Actress Award – IndieFest
- Lead Actress Award – IndieFest
- Best Actress – OutHouse Film Festival, LA
- Best Actress – NYC PictureStart Film Festival
- Best Leading Actress – Judge's award NYC Film Race
- Best Leading Actress – Audience Award NYC Film Race
- Best Actress in a lead – Movie Making Madness, NYC
- Promax World Gold Award – as lead actress in VH1 promo “Should I Stay or Should I go?”

== Filmography ==
=== Filmography ===
Year	Title	Role	Notes
2005	The Better Born	Her	
2005	The Fight Within	Sonya Netti	
2006	The Riverbank	Heather	
2006	Lost and Found	Sarah	
2006	Shadows of the Evening	Sarah	
2007	Fortunes of War	Sarah	
2007	Modern Times	Jessica	
2008	Overheard in NY	Female Customer	
2008	Definitely Maybe	Featured	Feature Film
2008	In Search of Mr. Ey	Actress	Feature Film
2009	Uptown	Isabel	Feature Film
2009	Mariah	Anne	
2009	Union	Angela	
2011	The Wind	Laura Simmonds	
2011	The Instant Messenger Mission	Queen Satowi	Feature Film
2012	Things I Don't Understand	Gabby Hunt	Feature Film
2012	What Is	Melora	
2013	My Brother Jack	Renee	Feature Film
2015	Lulu	her	
2016	White Paper Bag	Dr. Olivia Stanton	
2016	Looking For the Jackalope	Jennifer Lewis	Feature Film
2017	Treasure Map	Sarah Taylor	
2018	Full Moon And High Tide in The Ladies Room	Babe Egan	
2019	A Social Cure	Director	Feature Film
2020	Few of Many	Joanna	
2022	Blood Bond	Doctor Gloria Feinsten	Feature Film
2025	Last Act	Maureen	Episodic series
