= Tam Dean Burn =

Scottish actor (born 1958)

- Born: 1958 (age 67–68); Leith, Edinburgh, Scotland
- Education: Queen Margaret University
- Occupation: Actor
- Political party: Communist Party of Great Britain

Thomas Dean Burn (born 1958) is a Scottish actor who has played a wide range of roles on stage and screen; on television, he played multiple roles on long-running detective series Taggart, Retro in youth sci-fi thriller Life Force, and gangster Thomas McCabe in BBC Scotland's soap opera River City. Burn currently performs as a featured lead singer alongside Scars.

== Education and family ==
He attended Craigmount High School and trained in Acting at the School of Drama at Edinburgh’s Queen Margaret University. He is the brother of drummer Russell Burn, of Edinburgh band The Fire Engines. Both played together in the band The Dirty Reds.

== Politics ==
In the 1992 General Election, he contested the Glasgow Central seat, standing for the Communist Party of Great Britain (PCC). He received 106 votes, 0.4% of all votes cast, and finished last.

== Acting career ==
His theatrical roles include being the narrator of the 2009 play Year of the Horse, about artist Harry Horse. He starred on stage in Irvine Welsh's Headspace, in 1997. In 2016 he played Captain Edgar in August Strindberg's Dance of Death at the Citizens Theatre, Glasgow. In 2018 he narrated Tommy Smith's jazz version of Peter and the Wolf by Sergei Prokofieff with text specially adapted by Liz Lochhead. The Scottish National Jazz Orchestra recorded the piece live on 24 February 2018 at Queen's Hall, Edinburgh, Scotland. Since 2006, Burn has been the authentic 'Leither' voice narrating the audiobook versions of 18 of Irvine Welsh’s books.

== Charity work ==
He is also involved in work for young people. In 2014, he toured Scotland by bicycle, reading all 195 of Julia Donaldson's stories to children. He has campaigned to protect the Children's Wood in Kelvinside, Glasgow from property developers.

== 2019 stabbing ==
In March 2019, Burn was stabbed during an assault after appearing at an event at the Scottish Poetry Library in Edinburgh. He was hospitalised at Edinburgh Royal Infirmary but discharged on the same day; albeit he has a permanent scar as a result of the attack.

== Theatre ==
Year	Title	Role	Company	Director	Notes
1990	Hardie and Baird: The Last Days	John Baird	Traverse Theatre, Edinburgh	Ian Brown	play by James Kelman
2024	Three Words for Forest	Various	The Dear Green Bothy	Deirdre Heddon	a play drawing on interviews with forestry practitioners

== Filmography ==
Year	Title	Role	Notes
1983	Local Hero	Roddy	
1995	3	The Elder	
1996	The Leading Man	Henry	
1998	The Acid House	Alec	(segment "A Soft Touch")
1999	Miss Julie	Servant	
1999	Mauvaise Passe	Naked Husband	
2002	Doctor Sleep	Gas Man	
2003	Skagerrak	Dr. Meisling	
2003	Young Adam	Black Street Barman	
2011	Perfect Sense	Husband at Grave	
2011	War Horse	Medic in Trench	
2012	Shell	Trucker	
2012	Riot on Redchurch Street	Jerry Graff	
2013	City of Tales	The Officer	
2016	Moon Dogs	Davey	
2018	Outlaw King	John Macdougall of Argyll	
2018	Only You	Mike	
2019	The Victim		TV series
2025	Row	DCI MacKelly	
