= Saturn Award for Best Supporting Actress on Television =

Annual US television award

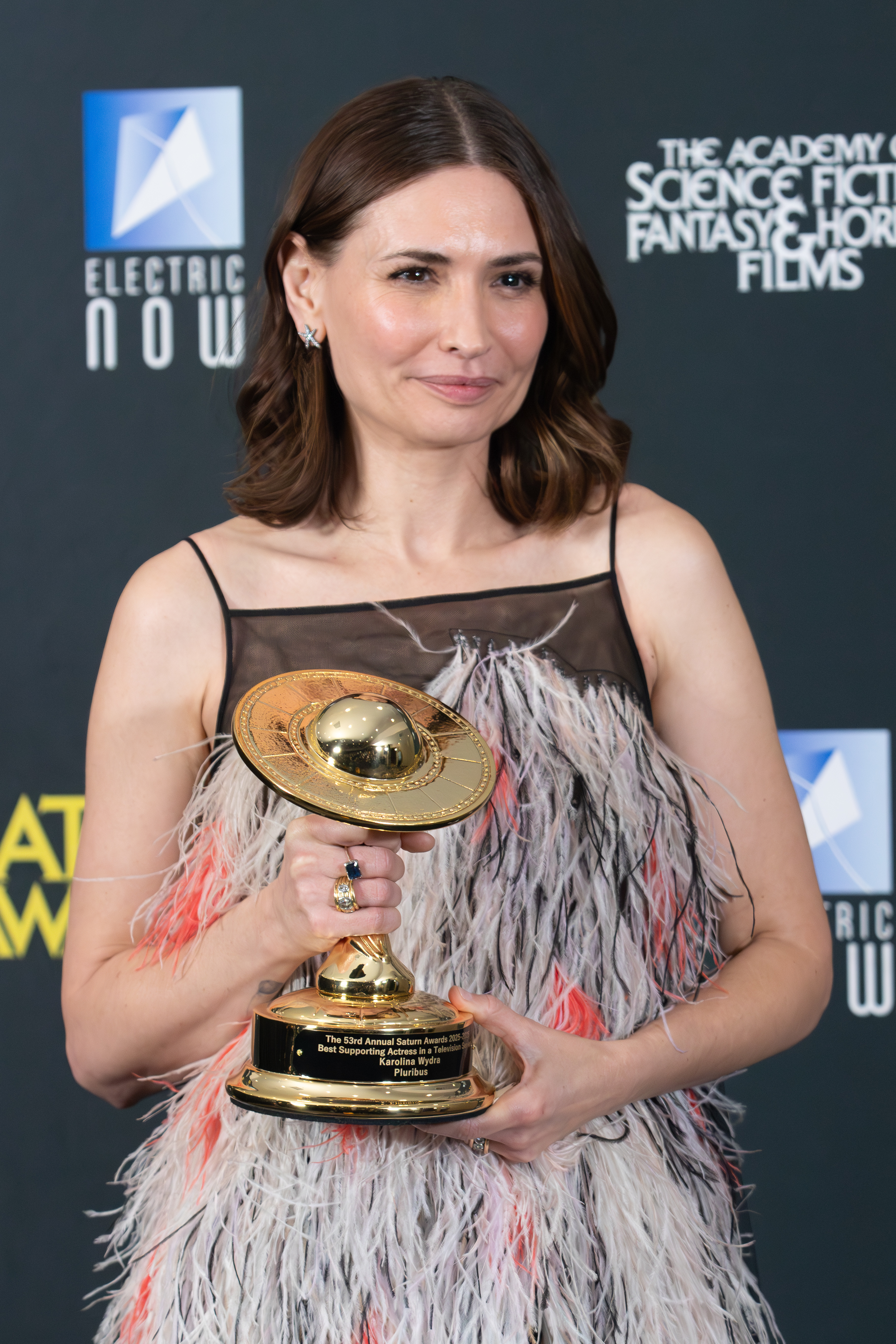
- The 2024/2025 recipient: Karolina Wydra
- Awarded for: Best performance of the year by a female in a supporting role in a genre television series
- Country: United States
- Presented by: Academy of Science Fiction, Fantasy and Horror Films
- First award: 1999
- Currently held by: Karolina Wydra for Pluribus (2024/2025)
- Website: www.saturnawards.org

The Saturn Award for Best Supporting Actress on Television is presented annually by the Academy of Science Fiction, Fantasy and Horror Films, honoring the work of actresses in science fiction, fantasy, and horror fiction on television.

The Walking Dead holds the record for the most wins in the category with six (from 18 total nominations), with four different actresses receiving the award, including Danai Gurira and Melissa McBride who, along with Star Trek actress Jeri Ryan, are the only people to have won the award twice. Laurie Holden was the first actress from the series to receive the award, and Lauren Cohan currently holds the network/cable version of the award. Emily Kinney and Tovah Feldshuh also received nominations.

As of the 47th Saturn Awards in 2022, the award is known as Best Supporting Actress in a Network or Cable Television Series and features a sister category: Saturn Award for Best Supporting Actress in a Streaming Television Series.

(NOTE: Year refers to year of eligibility, the actual ceremonies are held the following year.).

The winners are listed in bold.

== Winners and nominees ==
=== 1990s ===
Year	Actress	Television Program	Network	Character
1999 **(26th)**	**Justina Vail**	**Seven Days**	**UPN**	**Dr. Olga Vukavitch**
1999 **(26th)**	Charisma Carpenter	Angel	The WB	Cordelia Chase
1999 **(26th)**	Virginia Hey	Farscape	Sci-Fi	Pa'u Zotoh Zhaan
1999 **(26th)**	Heather Matarazzo	Now and Again	CBS	Heather Wiseman
1999 **(26th)**	Jeri Ryan	Star Trek: Voyager	UPN	Seven of Nine
1999 **(26th)**	Amanda Tapping	Stargate SG-1	Showtime	Samantha Carter

=== 2000s ===
Year	Actress	Television Program	Network	Character
2000 **(27th)**	**Jeri Ryan**	**Star Trek: Voyager**	**UPN**	**Seven of Nine**
2000 **(27th)**	Alyson Hannigan	Buffy the Vampire Slayer	The WB	Willow Rosenberg
2000 **(27th)**	Katherine Heigl	Roswell	The WB	Isabel Evans
2000 **(27th)**	Juliet Landau	Angel	The WB	Drusilla
2000 **(27th)**	Amanda Tapping	Stargate SG-1	Showtime	Samantha Carter
2000 **(27th)**	Michelle Trachtenberg	Buffy the Vampire Slayer	The WB	Dawn Summers
2001 **(28th)**	**Jolene Blalock**	**Enterprise**	**UPN**	**Sub-Commander T'Pol**
2001 **(28th)**	Gigi Edgley	Farscape	Sci-Fi	Chiana
2001 **(28th)**	Annabeth Gish	The X-Files	Fox	Monica Reyes
2001 **(28th)**	Alyson Hannigan	Buffy the Vampire Slayer	The WB	Willow Rosenberg
2001 **(28th)**	Amanda Tapping	Stargate SG-1	Showtime	Samantha Carter
2001 **(28th)**	Michelle Trachtenberg	Buffy the Vampire Slayer	The WB	Dawn Summers
2002 **(29th)**	**Alyson Hannigan**	**Buffy the Vampire Slayer**	**UPN**	**Willow Rosenberg**
2002 **(29th)**	Amy Acker	Angel	The WB	Winifred "Fred" Burkle
2002 **(29th)**	Jolene Blalock	Enterprise	UPN	Sub-Commander T'Pol
2002 **(29th)**	Heather Donahue	Taken	Sci-Fi	Mary Crawford
2002 **(29th)**	Dakota Fanning	Taken	Sci-Fi	Allie Keys
2002 **(29th)**	Michelle Trachtenberg	Buffy the Vampire Slayer	UPN	Dawn Summers
2003 **(30th)**	**Amy Acker**	**Angel**	**The WB**	**Winifred "Fred" Burkle**
2003 **(30th)**	Jolene Blalock	Star Trek: Enterprise	UPN	Sub-Commander T'Pol
2003 **(30th)**	Charisma Carpenter	Angel	The WB	Cordelia Chase
2003 **(30th)**	Victoria Pratt	Mutant X	Syndicated	Shalimar Fox
2003 **(30th)**	Katee Sackhoff	Battlestar Galactica (miniseries)	Sci-Fi	Lt. Kara "Starbuck" Thrace
2003 **(30th)**	Amanda Tapping	Stargate SG-1	Sci-Fi	Samantha Carter
2004 **(31st)**	**Amanda Tapping**	**Stargate SG-1**	**Sci-Fi**	**Major/Lt. Col. Samantha Carter**
2004 **(31st)**	Amy Acker	Angel	The WB	Winifred "Fred" Burkle / Illyria
2004 **(31st)**	Erica Durance	Smallville	The WB	Lois Lane
2004 **(31st)**	Torri Higginson	Stargate Atlantis	Sci-Fi	Dr. Elizabeth Weir
2004 **(31st)**	Samantha Mathis	Salem's Lot	TNT	Susan Norton
2004 **(31st)**	Sonya Walger	The Librarian: Quest for the Spear	TNT	Nicole Noone
2005 **(32nd)**	**Katee Sackhoff**	**Battlestar Galactica** (TV series)	**Sci-Fi**	**Lt. Kara "Starbuck" Thrace**
2005 **(32nd)**	Catherine Bell	The Triangle	Sci-Fi	Emily Patterson
2005 **(32nd)**	Claudia Black	Stargate SG-1	Sci-Fi	Vala Mal Doran
2005 **(32nd)**	Erica Durance	Smallville	The WB	Lois Lane
2005 **(32nd)**	Allison Mack	Smallville	The WB	Chloe Sullivan
2005 **(32nd)**	Michelle Rodriguez	Lost	ABC	Ana Lucia Cortez
2006 **(33rd)**	**Hayden Panettiere**	**Heroes**	**NBC**	**Claire Bennet**
2006 **(33rd)**	Gabrielle Anwar	The Librarian: Return to King Solomon's Mines	TNT	Emily Davenport
2006 **(33rd)**	Jennifer Carpenter	Dexter	Showtime	Debra Morgan
2006 **(33rd)**	Ali Larter	Heroes	NBC	Niki Sanders / Jessica Sanders
2006 **(33rd)**	Allison Mack	Smallville	The CW	Chloe Sullivan
2006 **(33rd)**	Elizabeth Mitchell	Lost	ABC	Juliet Burke
2007 **(34th)**	**Summer Glau**	**Terminator: The Sarah Connor Chronicles**	**Fox**	**Cameron Phillips**
2007 **(34th)**	**Elizabeth Mitchell**	**Lost**	**ABC**	**Juliet Burke**
2007 **(34th)**	Jaimie Alexander	Kyle XY	Freeform	Jessi
2007 **(34th)**	Jennifer Carpenter	Dexter	Showtime	Debra Morgan
2007 **(34th)**	Jaime Murray	Dexter	Showtime	Lila Tournay
2007 **(34th)**	Hayden Panettiere	Heroes	NBC	Claire Bennet
2008 **(35th)**	**Jennifer Carpenter**	**Dexter**	**Showtime**	**Debra Morgan**
2008 **(35th)**	Summer Glau	Terminator: The Sarah Connor Chronicles	Fox	Cameron Phillips
2008 **(35th)**	Yunjin Kim	Lost	ABC	Sun Kwon
2008 **(35th)**	Elizabeth Mitchell	Lost	ABC	Juliet Burke
2008 **(35th)**	Hayden Panettiere	Heroes	NBC	Claire Bennet
2008 **(35th)**	Katee Sackhoff	Battlestar Galactica (TV series)	Sci-Fi	Captain Kara "Starbuck" Thrace
2009 **(36th)**	**Julie Benz**	**Dexter**	**Showtime**	**Rita Morgan**
2009 **(36th)**	Morena Baccarin	V	ABC	Anna
2009 **(36th)**	Gina Bellman	Leverage	TNT	Sophie Devereaux
2009 **(36th)**	Jennifer Carpenter	Dexter	Showtime	Debra Morgan
2009 **(36th)**	Elizabeth Mitchell	Lost	ABC	Juliet Burke
2009 **(36th)**	Hayden Panettiere	Heroes	NBC	Claire Bennet

=== 2010s ===
Year	Actress	Television Program	Network	Character
2010 **(37th)**	**Lucy Lawless**	**Spartacus: Blood and Sand**	**Starz**	**Lucretia**
2010 **(37th)**	Morena Baccarin	V	ABC	Anna
2010 **(37th)**	Gina Bellman	Leverage	TNT	Sophie Devereaux
2010 **(37th)**	Jennifer Carpenter	Dexter	Showtime	Debra Morgan
2010 **(37th)**	Laurie Holden	The Walking Dead	AMC	Andrea
2010 **(37th)**	Beth Riesgraf	Leverage	TNT	Parker
2011 **(38th)**	**Michelle Forbes**	**The Killing**	**AMC**	**Mitch Larsen**
2011 **(38th)**	Lauren Ambrose	Torchwood: Miracle Day	Starz	Jilly Kitzinger
2011 **(38th)**	Jennifer Carpenter	Dexter	Showtime	Debra Morgan
2011 **(38th)**	Frances Conroy	American Horror Story: Murder House	FX	Moira O'Hara
2011 **(38th)**	Lana Parrilla	Once Upon a Time	ABC	Evil Queen / Regina Mills
2011 **(38th)**	Beth Riesgraf	Leverage	TNT	Parker
2012 **(39th)**	**Laurie Holden**	**The Walking Dead**	**AMC**	**Andrea**
2012 **(39th)**	Jennifer Carpenter	Dexter	Showtime	Debra Morgan
2012 **(39th)**	Sarah Carter	Falling Skies	TNT	Margaret
2012 **(39th)**	Anna Gunn	Breaking Bad	AMC	Skyler White
2012 **(39th)**	Jessica Lange	American Horror Story: Asylum	FX	Sister Jude Martin
2012 **(39th)**	Beth Riesgraf	Leverage	TNT	Parker
2013 **(40th)**	**Melissa McBride**	**The Walking Dead**	**AMC**	**Carol Peletier**
2013 **(40th)**	Kathy Bates	American Horror Story: Coven	FX	Madame Delphine LaLaurie
2013 **(40th)**	Sarah Carter	Falling Skies	TNT	Margaret
2013 **(40th)**	Gwendoline Christie	Game of Thrones	HBO	Brienne of Tarth
2013 **(40th)**	Michelle Fairley	Game of Thrones	HBO	Catelyn Stark
2013 **(40th)**	Elizabeth Mitchell	Revolution	NBC	Rachel Matheson
2014 **(41st)**	**Melissa McBride**	**The Walking Dead**	**AMC**	**Carol Peletier**
2014 **(41st)**	Emilia Clarke	Game of Thrones	HBO	Daenerys Targaryen
2014 **(41st)**	Jenna Coleman	Doctor Who	BBC America	Clara Oswald
2014 **(41st)**	Caroline Dhavernas	Hannibal	NBC	Dr. Alana Bloom
2014 **(41st)**	Lexa Doig	Continuum	Syfy	Sonya Valentine
2014 **(41st)**	Emily Kinney	The Walking Dead	AMC	Beth Greene
2015 **(42nd)**	**Danai Gurira**	**The Walking Dead**	**AMC**	**Michonne**
2015 **(42nd)**	Gillian Anderson	Hannibal	NBC	Dr. Bedelia Du Maurier
2015 **(42nd)**	Tovah Feldshuh	The Walking Dead	AMC	Deanna Monroe
2015 **(42nd)**	Calista Flockhart	Supergirl	CBS	Cat Grant
2015 **(42nd)**	Lena Headey	Game of Thrones	HBO	Cersei Lannister
2015 **(42nd)**	Melissa Leo	Wayward Pines	Fox	Pamela "Pam" Pilcher
2015 **(42nd)**	Melissa McBride	The Walking Dead	AMC	Carol Peletier
2016 **(43rd)**	**Candice Patton**	**The Flash**	**The CW**	**Iris West**
2016 **(43rd)**	Kathy Bates	American Horror Story: Roanoke	FX	Agnes Mary Winstead; Thomasin 'The Butcher' White
2016 **(43rd)**	Danai Gurira	The Walking Dead	AMC	Michonne
2016 **(43rd)**	Melissa McBride	The Walking Dead	AMC	Carol Peletier
2016 **(43rd)**	Thandie Newton	Westworld	HBO	Maeve Millay
2016 **(43rd)**	Adina Porter	American Horror Story: Roanoke	FX	Lee Harris
2016 **(43rd)**	Evan Rachel Wood	Westworld	HBO	Dolores Abernathy
2017 **(44th)**	**Rhea Seehorn**	**Better Call Saul**	**AMC**	**Kimberly "Kim" Wexler**
2017 **(44th)**	Odette Annable	Supergirl	The CW	Samantha Arias / Reign
2017 **(44th)**	Dakota Fanning	The Alienist	TNT	Sara Howard
2017 **(44th)**	Danai Gurira	The Walking Dead	AMC	Michonne
2017 **(44th)**	Melissa McBride	The Walking Dead	AMC	Carol Peletier
2017 **(44th)**	Candice Patton	The Flash	The CW	Iris West
2017 **(44th)**	Adina Porter	American Horror Story: Cult	FX	Beverly Hope
2017 **(44th)**	Krysten Ritter	The Defenders	Netflix	Jessica Jones
2018/2019 **(45th)**	Network/Cable			
2018/2019 **(45th)**	**Danai Gurira**	**The Walking Dead**	**AMC**	**Michonne**
2018/2019 **(45th)**	Gwendoline Christie	Game of Thrones	HBO	Brienne of Tarth
2018/2019 **(45th)**	Lena Headey	Game of Thrones	HBO	Cersei Lannister
2018/2019 **(45th)**	Melissa McBride	The Walking Dead	AMC	Carol Peletier
2018/2019 **(45th)**	Rhea Seehorn	Better Call Saul	AMC	Kimberly "Kim" Wexler
2018/2019 **(45th)**	Sophie Skelton	Outlander	Starz	Brianna Randall
2018/2019 **(45th)**	Sophie Turner	Game of Thrones	HBO	Sansa Stark
2018/2019 **(45th)**	Streaming			
2018/2019 **(45th)**	**Maya Hawke**	**Stranger Things**	**Netflix**	**Robin Buckley**
2018/2019 **(45th)**	Elliot Page (Note: Credited as Ellen Page; The Umbrella Academy premiered before Page came out as transgender.)	The Umbrella Academy	Netflix	Vanya Hargreeves
2018/2019 **(45th)**	Victoria Pedretti	The Haunting of Hill House	Netflix	Eleanor "Nell" Crain Vance
2018/2019 **(45th)**	Parker Posey	Lost in Space	Netflix	June Harris/Dr. Smith
2018/2019 **(45th)**	Taylor Russell	Lost in Space	Netflix	Judy Robinson
2018/2019 **(45th)**	Sissy Spacek	Castle Rock	Hulu	Ruth Deaver
2018/2019 **(45th)**	Deborah Ann Woll	Daredevil	Netflix	Karen Page
2019/2020 **(46th)**	**Danielle Panabaker**	**The Flash**	**The CW**	**Dr. Caitlin Snow / Killer Frost**
2019/2020 **(46th)**	Natasia Demetriou	What We Do in the Shadows	FX	Nadja
2019/2020 **(46th)**	Cynthia Erivo	The Outsider	HBO	Holly Gibney
2019/2020 **(46th)**	Melissa McBride	The Walking Dead	AMC	Carol Peletier
2019/2020 **(46th)**	Colby Minifie	Fear The Walking Dead	AMC	Virginia
2019/2020 **(46th)**	Sophie Skelton	Outlander	Starz	Brianna Randall
2019/2020 **(46th)**	Tessa Thompson	Westworld	HBO	Charlotte Hale

=== 2020s ===
Year	Actress	Television Program	Network	Character
2021/2022 **(50th)**
2021/2022 **(50th)**	Network/Cable			
2021/2022 **(50th)**	**Lauren Cohan**	**The Walking Dead**	**AMC**	**Maggie Greene**
2021/2022 **(50th)**	Emmanuelle Chriqui	Superman & Lois	The CW	Lana Lang
2021/2022 **(50th)**	Janina Gavankar	Big Sky	ABC	Ren
2021/2022 **(50th)**	Julia Jones	Dexter: New Blood	Showtime	Angela Bishop
2021/2022 **(50th)**	Melissa McBride	The Walking Dead	AMC	Carol Peletier
2021/2022 **(50th)**	Danielle Panabaker	The Flash	The CW	Caitlin Snow/Killer Frost
2021/2022 **(50th)**	Sophie Skelton	Outlander	Starz	Brianna Fraser
2021/2022 **(50th)**	Streaming			
2021/2022 **(50th)**	**Moses Ingram**	**Obi-Wan Kenobi**	**Disney+**	**Reva Sevander / Third Sister**
2021/2022 **(50th)**	Patricia Arquette	Severance	Apple TV+	Harmony Cobel
2021/2022 **(50th)**	Danielle Brooks	Peacemaker	HBO Max	Leota Adebayo
2021/2022 **(50th)**	Jess Bush	Star Trek: Strange New Worlds	Paramount+	Christine Chapel
2021/2022 **(50th)**	Nell Tiger Free	Servant	Apple TV+	Leanne Grayson
2021/2022 **(50th)**	Kathryn Hahn	WandaVision	Disney+	Agatha Harkness / Agnes
2021/2022 **(50th)**	Aleyse Shannon	Leverage: Redemption	Amazon Freevee	Breanna Casey
2022/2023 **(51st)**	**Jeri Ryan**	**Star Trek: Picard**	**Paramount+**	**Seven of Nine**
2022/2023 **(51st)**	Jess Bush	Star Trek: Strange New Worlds	Paramount+	Christine Chapel
2022/2023 **(51st)**	Celia Rose Gooding	Star Trek: Strange New Worlds	Paramount+	Nyota Uhura
2022/2023 **(51st)**	Genevieve O'Reilly	Andor	Disney+	Mon Mothma
2022/2023 **(51st)**	Katee Sackhoff	The Mandalorian	Disney+	Bo-Katan Kryze
2022/2023 **(51st)**	Sophie Skelton	Outlander	Starz	Brianna "Bree" Randall Fraser
2022/2023 **(51st)**	Rebecca Wisocky	Ghosts	CBS	Henrietta "Hetty" Woodstone
2023/2024 **(52nd)**	**Cristin Milioti**	**The Penguin**	**Max**	**Sofia Falcone**
2023/2024 **(52nd)**	Jennifer Connelly	Dark Matter	Apple TV+	Daniela Dessen
2023/2024 **(52nd)**	Jennifer Jason Leigh	Fargo	FX	Lorraine Lyon
2023/2024 **(52nd)**	Pollyanna McIntosh	The Walking Dead: The Ones Who Live	AMC	Jadis Stokes/Anne
2023/2024 **(52nd)**	Elizabeth Saunders	From	MGM+	Donna Raines
2023/2024 **(52nd)**	Anna Sawai	Monarch: Legacy of Monsters	Apple TV+	Cate Randa
2023/2024 **(52nd)**	Rebecca Wisocky	Ghosts	CBS	Henrietta "Hetty Woodstone
2024/2025 **(53rd)**	**Karolina Wydra**	**Pluribus**	**Apple TV+**	**Zosia**
2024/2025 **(53rd)**	Christina Chong	Star Trek: Strange New Worlds	Paramount+	La'an Noonien Singh
2024/2025 **(53rd)**	Denise Gough	Andor	Disney+	Dedra Meero
2024/2025 **(53rd)**	Jennifer Holland	Peacemaker	HBO Max	Emilia Harcourt
2024/2025 **(53rd)**	Julianne Nicholson	Paradise	Hulu	Samantha "Sinatra" Redmond
2024/2025 **(53rd)**	Genevieve O'Reilly	Andor	Disney+	Mon Mothma
2024/2025 **(53rd)**	Uma Thurman	Dexter: Resurrection	Paramount+	Charley Brown

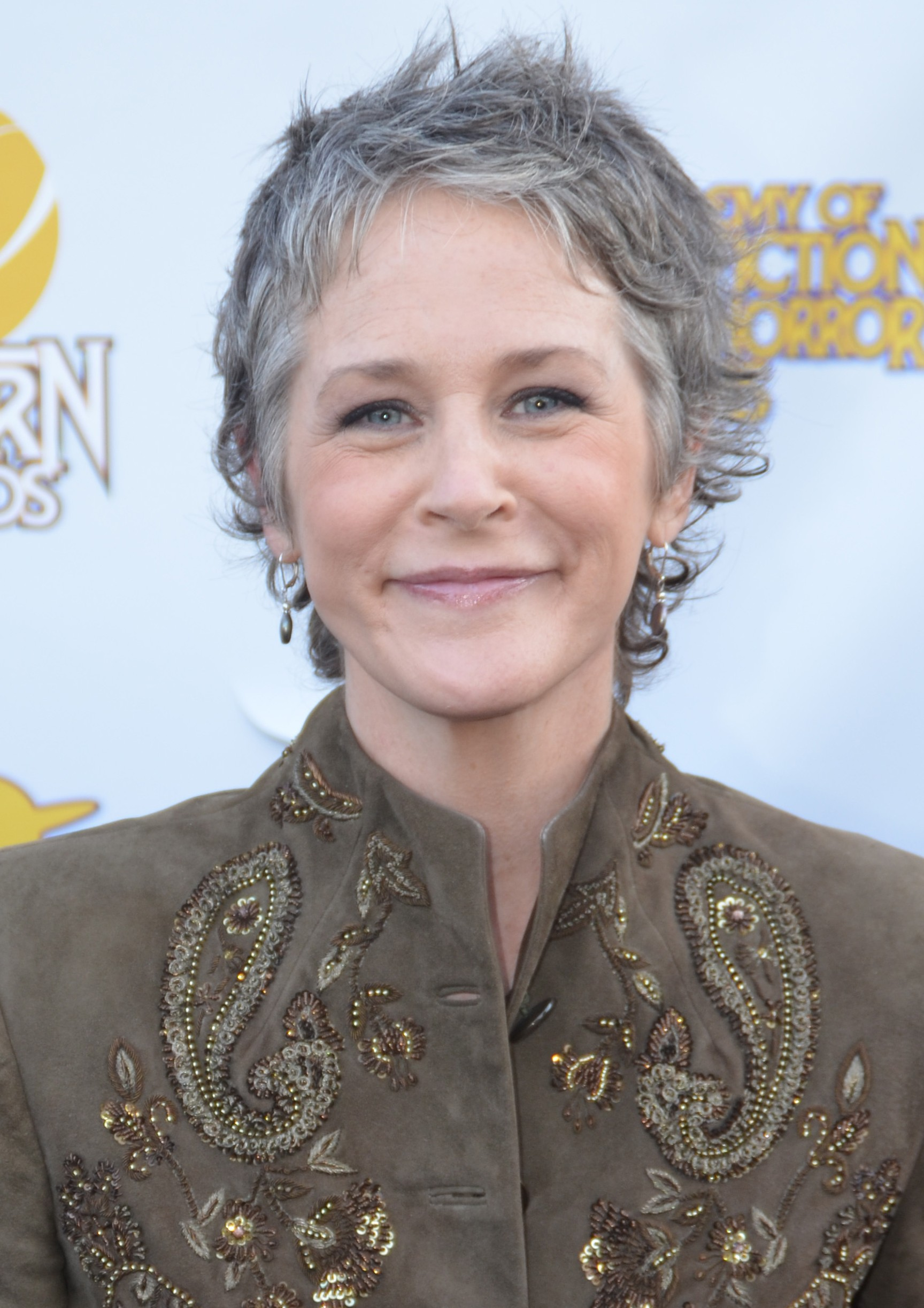
Melissa McBride, the only consecutive two-time winner in the category and holds the record for most nominations for an actress with eight total.

== Multiple nominations ==
8 nominations

- Melissa McBride

7 nominations

- Jennifer Carpenter

5 nominations

- Elizabeth Mitchell
- Amanda Tapping

4 nominations

- Danai Gurira
- Hayden Panettiere
- Katee Sackhoff
- Sophie Skelton

3 nominations

- Amy Acker
- Jolene Blalock
- Alyson Hannigan
- Candice Patton
- Beth Riesgraf
- Jeri Ryan
- Michelle Trachtenberg

2 nominations

- Morena Baccarin
- Kathy Bates
- Gina Bellman
- Charisma Carpenter
- Sarah Carter
- Gwendoline Christie
- Erica Durance
- Dakota Fanning
- Summer Glau
- Lena Headey
- Laurie Holden
- Allison Mack
- Danielle Panabaker
- Adina Porter
- Rhea Seehorn

== Multiple wins ==
2 wins

- Danai Gurira
- Melissa McBride (consecutive)
- Jeri Ryan

== See also ==
- Saturn Award for Best Supporting Actress in Streaming Presentation
