= Jason Burkey =

American actor

- Born: Jason Burkey; 1985 (age 40–41); St. Charles, Illinois, U.S.
- Education: Taylor University
- Occupation: Actor
- Years active: 2009–present

Jason Burkey (born 1985) is an American actor.

== Filmography ==
=== Film ===
Year	Title	Role	Notes
2010	The Trial	Prisoner	Uncredited
2011	Losers Take All	Peter	
2011	October Baby	Jason	
2011	23rd Psalm: Redemption	Sam	
2012	For the Glory	Kurt	
2012	The 10 Commandments of Chloe	Brandon	
2014	Coffee Shop	Kevin	
2014	Moms' Night Out	Disc jockey	
2015	Woodlawn	Insurance customer	
2018	I Can Only Imagine	Mike Scheuchzer	
2019	The Art of Self-Defense	Alex	
2020	Fearless Faith	Colton	
2021	Stars Fell on Alabama	Bryce Dixon	
2023	The Beanie Bubble	Blaine	

=== Television ===
Year	Title	Role	Notes
2009	Alumni	Zack	Television film
2014	The Summers Sisters	Drew	Television film
2015	Hindsight	Courtney	3 episodes
2015	Complications	Young man	Episode: "Relapse"
2015	Born Again Virgin	Set PA	Episode: "Extra"
2015	Being Mary Jane	Justin	2 episodes
2015	Your Worst Nightmare	Officer Brian Lewis	Episode: "While She Was Sleeping"
2016–2018	The Walking Dead	Kevin	5 episodes
2017	Shots Fired	Robbie Platt	Episode: "Hour Nine: Come to Jesus"
2017	Nashville	Dan Moran	Episode: "The Night Before (Life Goes On)"
2017	Halt and Catch Fire	Cater waiter #1	Episode: "Ten of Swords"
2017	Road Less Traveled	Spencer	Television film
2018	The Gifted	Nate	Episode: "3 X 1"
2018	Atlanta	Peter Savage	Episode: "Sportin' Waves"
2018	The Originals	David	Episode: "Between the Devil and the Deep Blue Sea"
2018	The Haves and the Have Nots	Officer Willis	Episode: "The Damned Defibrillator"
2018–2019	The Resident	Cody Coleman	4 episodes
2018	Country Christmas Album	Mike	Television film
2019–2020	The Oval	Secret Service Agent Lee	4 episodes
2020	Messiah	Military assistant	Episode: "God Is Greater"
2020	You Can't Take My Daughter	David	Television film
2020	Doom Patrol	Specs	Episode: "Space Patrol"
2020	Miracle on Christmas	James	Television film
2020	My Sweet Holiday	Alex	Television film
2021	Genius: Aretha	Time reporter	Episode: "Unforgettable"
2021	Dopesick	Todd Baumgarten	Episode: "The 5th Vital Sign"
2021–2022	Ordinary Joe	Darren	4 episodes
2022	Bull	Steve Davis	Episode: "Family Matters"
2024	Blue Bloods	Kyle	Episode: "Two of a Kind"
