= The End (Agents of S.H.I.E.L.D.) =

- Agents of S.H.I.E.L.D. episode
- Episode no.: Season 5 Episode 22
- Directed by: Jed Whedon
- Written by: Jed Whedon; Maurissa Tancharoen
- Cinematography by: Allan Westbrook
- Editing by: Eric Litman
- Original air date: May 18, 2018
- Running time: 43 minutes

Guest appearances
- Adrian Pasdar as Glenn Talbot; Lola Glaudini as Polly Hinton; Peter Mensah as Qovas; Lexy Kolker as young Robin Hinton; Jeff Ward as Deke Shaw

Episode chronology
← Previous "The Force of Gravity"	Next → "Missing Pieces"
- Agents of S.H.I.E.L.D. season 5

"The End" is the twenty-second episode and season finale of the fifth season of the American television series Agents of S.H.I.E.L.D. Based on the Marvel Comics organization S.H.I.E.L.D., it follows Phil Coulson and his team of S.H.I.E.L.D. agents as they confront Glenn Talbot. It is set in the Marvel Cinematic Universe (MCU) and acknowledges the franchise's films. The episode was written by Jed Whedon and Maurissa Tancharoen, and directed by Jed Whedon.

The show was expected to be cancelled after the fifth season, so the episode was planned and written as the series finale. However, in May 2018, a 13-episode sixth season was confirmed, and a seventh season of the same length was announced in November.

Clark Gregg reprises his role as Coulson from the film series, starring alongside Ming-Na Wen, Chloe Bennet, Iain De Caestecker, Elizabeth Henstridge, Henry Simmons, and Natalia Cordova-Buckley. "The End" originally aired on ABC on May 18, 2018, and was watched by 1.88 million viewers within a week.

== Plot ==
The team argues about the usage of the Centipede serum until Melinda May destroys the Odium vial. Deke Shaw advises Daisy Johnson to help unite the team and settle their differences. Under coercion, Robin Hinton informs Glenn Talbot of a gravitonium deposit in Chicago, to which he commandeers Qovas's ship. Johnson chooses Alphonso "Mack" Mackenzie to lead S.H.I.E.L.D. and he coordinates the team as they evacuate as many civilians as possible. Jemma Simmons provides Phil Coulson with the Centipede serum, but he refuses to take it and discreetly hides it in Johnson's gauntlets while convincing her to face Talbot alone. Johnson attempts to appeal to Talbot's patriotism, but Talbot attacks and attempts to absorb her.

Discovering the serum, Johnson injects herself with it and uses her enhanced abilities to blast Talbot into space, thus changing the timeline. While rescuing Polly Hinton and Robin from Qovas' ship, Leo Fitz is mortally wounded by falling debris. May and Mack stay by his side as he dies. Simmons resolves to find the present version of Fitz, who is in stasis aboard Enoch's ship. After bidding his fellow agents farewell, Coulson is accompanied by May as he leaves S.H.I.E.L.D. to spend his last days in Tahiti.

== Production ==
=== Writing ===
At the end of February 2018, the writers were planning the end of the pod, and were planning for the final episode to be able to serve as both a season and series finale, with some elements that could be adjusted based on whether the series was renewed for a sixth season or not. Jed Whedon added, "we're ready for if this is the end. We're definitely going to make it rewarding either way." The season ends with the agents having to make a choice between Phil Coulson's life or saving the world, which was "where we were always going" when the showrunners were plotting out the season. By killing Fitz in "The End", but revealing there was another still in space journeying to the future, Jeffrey Bell noted it helped solve "the one time loop problem we had". Whedon explained when deciding when to bring the characters back to the present, it was discussed to have them return to the diner where they were taken, but Fitz would still be there, so the group was brought back after Fitz left to avoid that problem, which "became this great opportunity. What we realized is the thing that would weirdly have the most impact, one of the most painful things that you can experience, could be then experienced and then, not brought back, but a loophole could be revealed."

The showrunners spoke to not including a bonus scene at the end of "The End" to tease what would come, Maurissa Tancharoen said, "We felt like it needed to end in Tahiti. To take away from that would be wrong." Bell added, "It's also, emotionally, about the two senior members of the team, who in a sense have retired to Tahiti, and there they are watching the future of S.H.I.E.L.D. fly off into a new adventure... It felt like a nice, succinct ending." Coulson's journey was always meant to end at Tahiti, something the showrunners revealed was decided since the start of the series. Whedon explained, "We thought it was a beautiful image... It's one of the things where you don't overthink it. We latched onto that and went, 'That will be great.' It's an emotional thing for him. We even heard from Mike Peterson that this was something he always wanted. Our big mystery in episode 1 was, "Never been to Tahiti." He doesn't know, and he can never know. And here he is, finding some sort of peace on that beach. We love that image and we were solid on it all the way."

=== Casting ===
Main cast members Clark Gregg, Ming-Na Wen, Chloe Bennet, Iain De Caestecker, Elizabeth Henstridge, and Henry Simmons return from previous seasons as Phil Coulson, Melinda May, Daisy Johnson / Quake, Leo Fitz, Jemma Simmons, and Alphonso "Mack" Mackenzie, respectively. Before the 2017 New York Comic Con, it was revealed that Natalia Cordova-Buckley had been promoted to series regular for the season, after recurring in the past two seasons as Elena "Yo-Yo" Rodriguez. Also in the episode, Adrian Pasdar recurs as Glenn Talbot, who becomes the supervillain Graviton; Lola Glaudini as Polly Hinton; Lexy Kolker as young Robin Hinton; Peter Mensah portrays the alien Qovas; and Jeff Ward recurs as Deke Shaw, a character from the future.

=== Music ===
Despite the increase of synthesizers, Bear McCreary kept his established symphonic writing and characters themes "as the foundation of the score". He felt the balance he looked to achieve between the synthesizers and classic orchestra was "epitomized" in his score for "The End".

=== Marvel Cinematic Universe tie-ins ===
"The End" takes place during the events of Avengers: Infinity War (2018) and the episode makes a few references to the film, mostly from Talbot, who plans to join the Avengers to stop Thanos. Bell also spoke to not directly referencing the end of Infinity War in "The End", by not showing any of the characters killed as a result of the Blip caused by Thanos. He said "Part of what happened was, they changed the release date... we move at a different schedule than they do and so suddenly everything was a week earlier, and so we had to make some adjustments and that's how we end up with our story." Whedon continued, "the other thing is that there's certain story points that are so – there would really be no way for us to address it and keep our show intact. Given that there's another movie coming out, and there's gonna be constant repercussions of their universe, so what we felt was that the safe play for our story, and for the integrity of our universe, was to operate outside of it."

== Release ==
"The End" was first aired in the United States on ABC on May 18, 2018. The episode, along with the rest of the fifth season, began streaming on Netflix in the United States on June 17, 2018.

== Reception ==
=== Ratings ===
On its airdate, "The End" was watched by 1.88 million American viewers and it was watched by 3.34 million viewers total.

=== Critical response ===
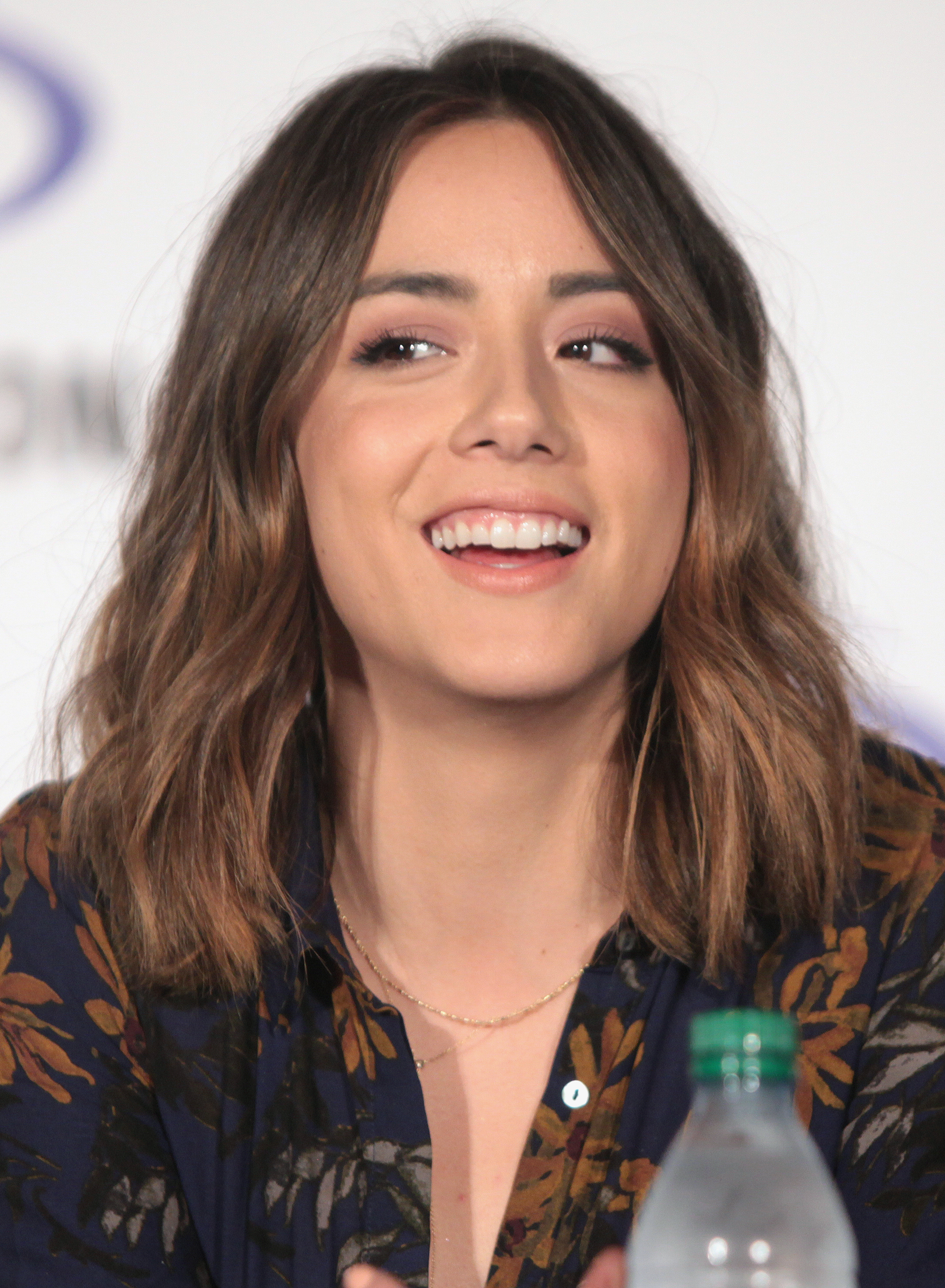
Chloe Bennet received praise for her performance as Daisy Johnson.

Matt Fowler of IGN praised the episode, saying the finale "delivered some really powerful moments" and was "a fitting, temporary end". Fowler also said, "When the show comes back, they'll most likely find a way to have Coulson be around, or come back. Fitz too. I'm not a huge fan of the retro-undoing of big dramatic beats. As it all stands now though, with only this episode to go by, "The End" was a formidable and fitting close out. The Coulson/Daisy relationship is one of the best things this series has coddled and cultivated over the years so it was grand to see that "I love you" farewell at the end, as Phil left to "retire" on the beaches of (actual) Tahiti with May. Also, making it so that Mack was the new team leader and not Daisy, as we'd been trained to think would happen, was a quirky swerve." Marc Buxton of Den of Geek gave the episode mixed reviews, claiming "It kind of seems like this week's finale was filmed way before the order came for season six because "The End" provides just that, a full circle ending. But there is another season, there are more threats and horrors that await, there is a post Avengers 4 world that will need saving, and there is a brave man in stasis who is loved by his brave wife very much."

David Rouben of FanSided said, "Agents of S.H.I.E.L.D. has been preparing us for Coulson's death ever since the 100th episode, which makes Fitz's untimely demise arguably even worse. It's the worst outcome imaginable for Simmons, since it happened right after they got married and before they could've had kids. It makes the cliffhanger for season 6 even more unbearable, though you have to wonder if this episode was scripted to be the series finale."
