= I Can Only Imagine (film) =

2018 film directed by Erwin Brothers

- Theatrical release poster
- Directed by: Erwin Brothers
- Screenplay by: Jon Erwin; Brent McCorkle
- Story by: Alex Cramer; Jon Erwin; Brent McCorkle
- Based on: The life story of Bart Millard
- Produced by: Cindy Bond; Kevin Downes; Daryl Lefever; Mickey Liddell; Pete Shilaimon; Raymond Harris; Joe Knopp
- Starring: J. Michael Finley; Madeline Carroll; Trace Adkins; Priscilla Shirer; Cloris Leachman; Dennis Quaid
- Cinematography: Kristopher Kimlin
- Edited by: Andrew Erwin; Brent McCorkle
- Music by: Brent McCorkle
- Production companies: LD Entertainment; Erwin Brothers Entertainment; Kevin Downes Productions; Mission Pictures International
- Distributed by: Lionsgate; Roadside Attractions
- Release date: March 16, 2018
- Running time: 110 minutes
- Country: United States
- Language: English
- Budget: $7 million
- Box office: $86 million

I Can Only Imagine is a 2018 American Christian biographical drama film directed by the Erwin Brothers and written by Alex Cramer, Jon Erwin, and Brent McCorkle, based on the story behind the group MercyMe's song of the same name, one of the best-selling Christian singles of all time. The film stars J. Michael Finley as Bart Millard, the lead singer who wrote the song about his relationship with his father Arthur Millard (Dennis Quaid). Madeline Carroll, Trace Adkins, Priscilla Shirer, and Cloris Leachman also star.

I Can Only Imagine was released in the United States on March 16, 2018. It was a box office success, grossing $86 million worldwide against a production budget of $7 million, earning more than twelve times its budget. It is the fifth highest-grossing music biopic and sixth highest-grossing Christian film of all-time in the United States. At the 2018 Dove Awards, the film won "Inspirational Film of the Year". A sequel, I Can Only Imagine 2, was released on February 20, 2026.

== Plot ==
Ten-year-old Bart Millard lives with his mother Adele and abusive father Arthur in Texas. One day, Bart's mother drops him off at a Christian camp, where Bart meets Shannon Street. Upon his return from camp, Bart finds that his mother has left and movers are removing her belongings. Bart angrily confronts Arthur, who denies that his abusiveness was the reason she left.

Years later, in high school, Bart and Shannon are dating. Bart plays football to please Arthur, but is injured, breaking both ankles and ending his career. The only elective with openings is music class, so he reluctantly signs up. Initially, Bart is assigned to be a sound technician, but after overhearing him singing, the director casts him in the lead role in the school production of Oklahoma!. Bart overcomes his reluctance and gives an impressive performance, but does not tell Arthur, who finds out the night of the show when he happens to see a flyer for the show in a diner. Arthur suddenly collapses in pain, and finds out he has cancer, which he hides from Bart. The following morning, Bart fights with Arthur, who smashes a plate over his head. At church, Shannon sees the blood and presses Bart to open up, but he responds by breaking up with her, and leaves town to seek his fortune in the city.

Bart joins a band in need of a singer, and convinces Christian music producer Scott Brickell to manage the band and secure a showcase in Nashville. Bart surprises Shannon and invites her to tour with the band, and is confused when Shannon flatly refuses. In Nashville, Brickell introduces Bart to established artists Amy Grant and Michael W. Smith, but is unable to convince record executives to sign the band, who do not believe the band, now performing as "MercyMe", is good enough. Devastated, Bart quits the band, but Brickell thinks that Bart needs to resolve issues in his personal life, so Bart reconciles with the band and asks them to wait for him, and leaves to return home.

Bart returns home late at night, and is confused to find that Arthur has prepared breakfast for him the next morning. Arthur claims to have become a Christian, but Bart is skeptical and refuses to forgive him, and leaves. In anger and despair, Arthur smashes his old Jeep, which he had asked Bart to help him restore. Bart attempts to drive away in Arthur's pickup, but discovers his father's terminal cancer diagnosis, and returns to Arthur. Bart forgives his father, and the two form a deep bond, but Arthur soon dies of his illness.

After Arthur's funeral, Bart rejoins the band and writes "I Can Only Imagine", and also calls Shannon and apologizes to her for the first time since their breakup. Brickell sends the demo tape to several artists, including Grant, who, deeply moved by the song, asks to record it herself as her next single, and Bart, who just wants the song to be heard, accepts. On stage, Grant begins the song, but can't bring herself to sing it, and calls Bart on stage from the audience to sing it himself. After Bart's performance, he sees his father in the audience smiling and clapping. The audience gives an enthusiastic ovation, and he reunites with Shannon, who was also in attendance. The band releases the song as their first single, achieving success on both Christian and mainstream radio.

== Cast ==
- J. Michael Finley as Bart Millard, the lead vocalist of MercyMe
  - Brody Rose as young Bart Millard
- Madeline Carroll as Shannon Street, Bart's girlfriend
  - Taegan Burns as young Shannon Street
- Trace Adkins as Scott Brickell, MercyMe's manager
- Priscilla C. Shirer as Mrs. Fincher, Bart's teacher
- Cloris Leachman as Meemaw Leona Millard, Bart's paternal grandmother
- Dennis Quaid as Arthur Millard, Bart's abusive father
- Tanya Clarke as Adele Millard, Bart's mother
- Jason Burkey as Mike Scheuchzer, the guitarist of MercyMe
- J.R. Cacia as Rusty
- Nicole DuPort as Amy Grant
- Jake B. Miller as Michael W. Smith
- Mark Furze as Nathan Cochran, the bassist of MercyMe
- Randy McDowell as Jim Bryson, the keyboardist of MercyMe
- Cole Marcus as Robbie Shaffer, the percussionist of MercyMe
- Gianna Simone as Dr. Avondale
- Kevin Downes as Singleton
- Delilah as Herself
- Bart Millard as Radio Host

== Production ==
The film was announced in December 2016. Dennis Quaid joined the cast in January 2017. Broadway actor J. Michael Finley, who sang all the songs in the movie, makes his film debut as Bart Millard. The same month, it was announced that the film was slated for release in the spring of 2018. In August 2017, Lionsgate and Roadside Attractions signed on as distributors for the film for a nationwide release in the United States.

== Reception ==
=== Box office ===
I Can Only Imagine grossed $83.4 million in the United States and Canada and $1.8 million in other territories, for a worldwide total of $85.2 million, against a production budget of $7 million. It is the highest-grossing independent film of 2018.

I Can Only Imagine was released on March 16, 2018, alongside Tomb Raider and Love, Simon, and was originally projected to gross $2–4 million from 1,620 theaters in its opening weekend. However, after making $6.2 million on its first day (including $1.3 million from Thursday night previews), weekend estimates were increased to $14 million. It ended up grossing $17.1 million, exceeding expectations and finishing third at the box office behind Black Panther and Tomb Raider. 67% of the opening weekend audience was female while 80% was over the age of 35. It was the fourth best-ever opening for a faith-based film, following The Passion of the Christ ($83.8 million), Son of God ($25.6 million) and Heaven Is for Real ($22.5 million). In its second weekend the film was added to 624 additional theaters and dropped just 19% to $13.8 million, again finishing third. It was added to another 395 venues and finished fourth in its third weekend, making $10.4 million (including $3 million on Easter Sunday).

The film has been translated and distributed in several countries, including China, according to co-director Jon Erwin:

I find it very interesting that in the same year that China actually restricted ... Christianity, they paid for "I Can Only Imagine". ... They paid for the right to translate it and distribute it to their people. That's happened in over 100 countries around the world with our films.

=== Critical response ===
On review aggregator Rotten Tomatoes, the film holds an approval rating of 69% based on 32 reviews, with an average rating of 5.8/10. The website's critical consensus reads, "I Can Only Imagine's message will have the most impact among Christian audiences, but overall, its performances and storytelling represent a notable evolution in faith-based cinema." However, on Metacritic, the film has a weighted average score of 30 out of 100, based on eight critics, indicating "generally unfavorable" reviews. Audiences polled by CinemaScore gave the film a rare average grade of "A+" on an A+ to F scale.

The Arizona Republic's James Ward gave the film 4 stars out of 5 and wrote, "Too often faith-based films—say anything with Kirk Cameron or the terrible God's Not Dead series—tend to preach to the choir or hector their audience. The Erwins' films—I Can Only Imagine definitely among them—are more inclusive, charitable of spirit and hopeful, all qualities that are always appreciated, be they rooted in Christian faith or otherwise." David Ehrlich of IndieWire gave the film a "C−" saying: "There's a reason why all of these movies are so amateurishly made; why they all end with links to religious websites; why they all look like they were shot on an iPhone by a Walmart-brand Janusz Kaminski who lit each interior like the white light of heaven was streaming through every window... Art can be affirmation, but affirmation cannot be art."

Faith-based reviewers mostly gave the movie positive reviews. Megan Basham of World magazine called Quaid "the real workhorse" and added that he "bears the heavy load of convincingly giving us both a monster and a repentant dad longing to connect with his son. Quaid impresses on both counts." Michael Foust of the Southern Baptist Texan gave the film 5 out of 5 stars and wrote, "The screenplay is gripping, the soundtrack is perfect, and the performances by Quaid and Finley had me squirming, laughing and crying."

=== Home media ===
The film was released on iTunes and Google Play on June 5, 2018, and on DVD and Blu-ray on June 12, 2018. I Can Only Imagine was the no. 1 film in DVD sales and rentals for the weeks ending June 17 and June 24, 2018. As of February 2020, I Can Only Imagine has earned $24 million in home media sales.

== Awards and nominations ==
Award	Date of ceremony	Category	Recipients	Result
K-LOVE Fan Awards	May 27, 2018	Film Impact	I Can Only Imagine	Won
Dove Awards	October 16, 2018	Inspirational Film of the Year	I Can Only Imagine	Won
People's Choice Awards	November 11, 2018	The Family Movie of 2018	I Can Only Imagine	Nominated
27th Annual Movieguide Awards	February 8, 2019	Best Movie For Families	I Can Only Imagine	Nominated
27th Annual Movieguide Awards	February 8, 2019	Epiphany Prize for Most Inspiring Movie	I Can Only Imagine	Won
27th Annual Movieguide Awards	February 8, 2019	Grace Award for Movies	Dennis Quaid and J. Michael Finley, for their roles in I Can Only Imagine	Nominated
9th Annual Guild of Music Supervisors Awards	February 13, 2019	Best Music Supervision for Film Budgeted Under $10 Million	Kevin Edelman and Ben Sokoler – I Can Only Imagine	Nominated
Plugged In Movie Awards 2019	February 22, 2019	Best Christian Movie – Audience's Choice	I Can Only Imagine	Won

== Sequel ==
In December 2024, a sequel was announced to be in development. Directed by Brent McCorkle and Andrew Erwin, from a script written by McCorkle, the story will follow the continued life events of Bart Millard. John Michael Finley will reprise the main role, while Dennis Quaid and Trace Adkins would return respectively as Arthur Millard and Scott Brickell. Milo Ventimiglia will also feature in the cast as Tim Timmons. The project will be a joint-venture production between Lionsgate and Kingdom Story Company. Kevin Downes, Erwin, Cindy Bond, Millard, Daryl Lefever and Joshua Walsh serve as producers.

== See also ==
- Kingdom Story Company
- I Still Believe (film)
