= Sophie Skelton =

British actress (born 1994)

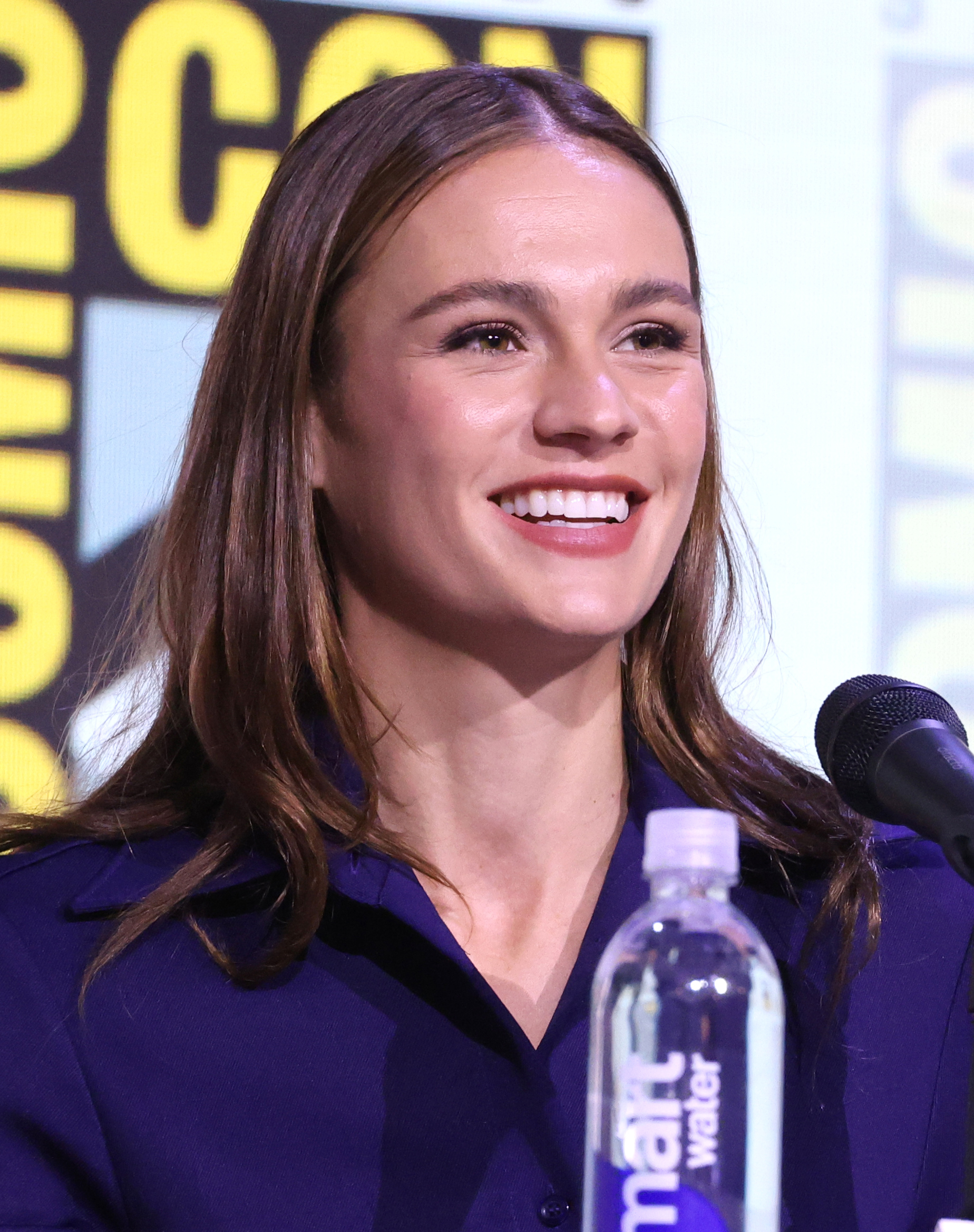
- Skelton in 2025
- Born: Sophie Alexandra Skelton; 7 March 1994 (age 32); Woodford, Stockport, England
- Occupation: Actress
- Years active: 2008–present

Sophie Alexandra Skelton (born 7 March 1994) is an English actress. She is best known for her role as Brianna MacKenzie in the Starz drama series Outlander.

== Early life ==
Skelton was born and raised in Woodford, Stockport, the daughter of entrepreneurial children's toy inventors. She began dancing at the age of three, eventually training in ballet at the Royal Academy in London, before moving into musical theater and stage productions. Her first professional television role, in series two of the British crime drama DCI Banks (2012), was a two-episode stint as schoolgirl Becca Smith.

Skelton attended Stockport Grammar School, completing her A-levels in 2012. She was going to study English Literature at King's College London the following year but ended up turning down her offer to pursue acting instead.

== Career ==
In 2013, Skelton guest-starred as Esme Vasquez-Jones in series one of CBBC's award-winning children's drama The Dumping Ground. That same year, she went on to portray Nikki Boston's (Heather Peace) estranged daughter Eve in the ninth series of BBC One's school-based drama series, Waterloo Road, and Yasmin Carish in a series thirteen episode of the long running medical series Doctors.

Transitioning into feature films, Skelton's first role was in 2014's The War I Knew. She portrayed Margaret in director Ian Vernon's tale of a WWII paratrooper lost behind enemy lines.

2015 saw a return to episodic television for Skelton. She again appeared in the BBC series Doctors, portraying Ellen Singleton in the series sixteen episode "Revenge". Next, she guest starred in a series nine episode of ITV's period crime drama Foyle's War. Later that year, Skelton appeared in a twelve-episode stint as Sofia Matthews on So Awkward, CBBC's sitcom revolving around three socially awkward school-age friends, and a two episode guest starring role as Gemma Holt on BBC One's medical drama Casualty.

Skelton's first leading film role was in Charlotte Stente Nielsen's 2016 fantasy-horror short Blackbird. Her breakout role, in the British fantasy action-adventure series Ren: The Girl with the Mark, came later that year. She won Best Lead Actress at the Hyperdrive Sci-Fi and Fantasy Film Festival for her role in the series. 2016 also saw Skelton cast in the role of Brianna Fraser in the Starz TV series Outlander. The role, opposite Scottish actor Richard Rankin as Roger MacKenzie is recurring, becoming a main cast member from Season 4 onwards, and will continue throughout their story arc as outlined in Diana Gabaldon's genre-bending book series.

In 2017, Skelton portrayed Jess in Christopher Menaul's film Another Mother's Son, the true story of Louisa Gould, a widow living in Nazi-occupied Jersey during WWII. From there she went on to star in Day of the Dead: Bloodline (2017), a remake of the 1985 George A. Romero zombie film and alongside Nicolas Cage in the bank heist film #211 (2018), based upon the real-life "Battle of North Hollywood" in 1997.

She played Lexi in Row (2025). She played Shannon Street in I Can Only Imagine 2 (2026).

== Filmography ==
=== Film ===
Year	Title	Role	Notes
2014	The War I Knew	Margaret	
2016	Blackbird	Rose	Short film
2017	Another Mother's Son	Jess	
2017	Day of the Dead: Bloodline	Zoe Parker	
2018	211	Lisa MacAvoy	
2022	Stalker	Rose Hepburn	
2025	Row	Lexi	
2026	I Can Only Imagine 2	Shannon Street	

=== Television ===
Year	Title	Character	Production	Notes
2012	DCI Banks	Becca Smith	ITV	2 episodes
2013	The Dumping Ground	Esme Vasquez-Jones	CBBC	Episode: "Esme"
2013−2014	Waterloo Road	Eve Boston	BBC One	2 episodes
2013, 2015	Doctors	Yasmin Carish / Ellen Singleton	BBC	2 episodes
2015	Foyle's War	Student Jane	ITV	Episode: "Trespass"
2015	So Awkward	Sofia Matthews	CBBC	Recurring role, 12 episodes
2015	Casualty	Gemma Holt	BBC One	2 episodes
2016	Ren: The Girl with the Mark	Ren	Online	Series regular, 5 episodes
2016–2026	Outlander	Brianna Fraser	STARZ	Main role (season 2– season 8) 60 episodes
2023	Castlevania: Nocturne	Julia Belmont (voice)	Netflix	Episode: "A Common Enemy in Evil"

== Awards and nominations ==
Year	Award	Category	Nominated work	Result
2016	Hyperdrive Festival Award	Best Leading Actress	Ren	Won
2016	Jury Award	Best Actress	Ren	Nominated
2016	International Online Web Fest	Best Actress	Ren	Nominated
2019	Saturn Awards	Best Supporting Actress on Television	Outlander	Nominated
2021	Saturn Awards	Best Supporting Actress on Television	Outlander	Nominated
2022	Saturn Awards	Best Supporting Actress in a Network or Cable Television Series	Outlander	Nominated
