= John Michael Finley =

American actor and singer

- Born: John Michael Finley; August 10, 1988 (age 38); Jonesboro, Arkansas, U.S.
- Education: Roosevelt University (Chicago College of Performing Arts)
- Occupations: Actor, singer
- Years active: 2010s–present
- Spouse: Elizabeth Doran (m. 2017)

John Michael Finley (born August 10, 1988) is an American actor and singer. He is known for portraying Bart Millard in the 2018 film I Can Only Imagine and the 2026 sequel I Can Only Imagine 2. He has appeared on Broadway, in London’s West End, in the Australian production of The Book of Mormon, and in numerous Chicago-area theatres. He is a member of the Actors' Equity Association.

== Early life and education ==
Finley was born in Jonesboro, Arkansas, and raised in Lebanon, Missouri. He began singing and acting in junior high school and performed in school and community theatre. He later studied musical theatre at the Chicago College of Performing Arts at Roosevelt University, earning a BFA.

== Career ==
=== Early Chicago theatre ===
Finley launched his professional career in Chicago, performing in productions at the Lyric Opera of Chicago, Paramount Theatre, Marriott Theatre, Drury Lane Theatre, Writers' Theatre, Court Theatre, and the Mercury Theatre. His early roles included parts in Carousel, Camelot, Sweeney Todd, Grease, Hair, James Joyce's The Dead, and A Little Night Music.

=== Broadway, West End, and international stage ===
Finley moved to New York City in 2015. He made his Broadway debut in the ensemble of Les Misérables, where he understudied the role of Jean Valjean.

He later joined the Broadway company of The Book of Mormon as the standby for Elder Cunningham. His performance with the production led to West End and Australian engagements in the same role.

=== Film ===
Finley gained widespread recognition for his film debut portraying Bart Millard in the 2018 biographical drama I Can Only Imagine, which earned notable box office results for its budget.

He reprised the role in I Can Only Imagine 2, released February 20, 2026, with Dennis Quaid and Trace Adkins returning.

Finley has also appeared in other faith-based and historical films, including:

- Faith of Angels (2024), portraying John Skinner, a man whose knowledge of a mine aids in rescuing a lost child.
- Love, Courage and the Battle of Bushy Run (2024), in which he portrayed Captain John Graham.

=== Other work ===
Finley has discussed themes of faith, loss, and community in interviews related to his film work, particularly Faith of Angels.

== Personal life ==
Finley married Elizabeth Doran on December 2, 2017. He has a baritone singing voice and is a fan of the St. Louis Cardinals. He is also a member of the Actors' Equity Association.

== Selected filmography ==
- I Can Only Imagine (2018) – Bart Millard
- Faith of Angels (2024) – John Skinner
- Love, Courage and the Battle of Bushy Run (2024) – Captain John Graham
- I Can Only Imagine 2 (2026) – Bart Millard

== Selected theatre credits ==
- Les Misérables (Broadway) – ensemble; understudy for Jean Valjean
- The Book of Mormon (Broadway) – standby for Elder Cunningham
- The Book of Mormon (West End) – Elder Cunningham
- The Book of Mormon (Australia) – Elder Cunningham
- Carousel – Lyric Opera of Chicago
- Sweeney Todd – Drury Lane Theatre
- Camelot – Marriott Theatre
- Hair – Paramount Theatre
- Grease – Paramount Theatre
- James Joyce's The Dead – Court Theatre
- A Little Night Music – Writers' Theatre
