= Bella Dayne =

German actress (born 1988)

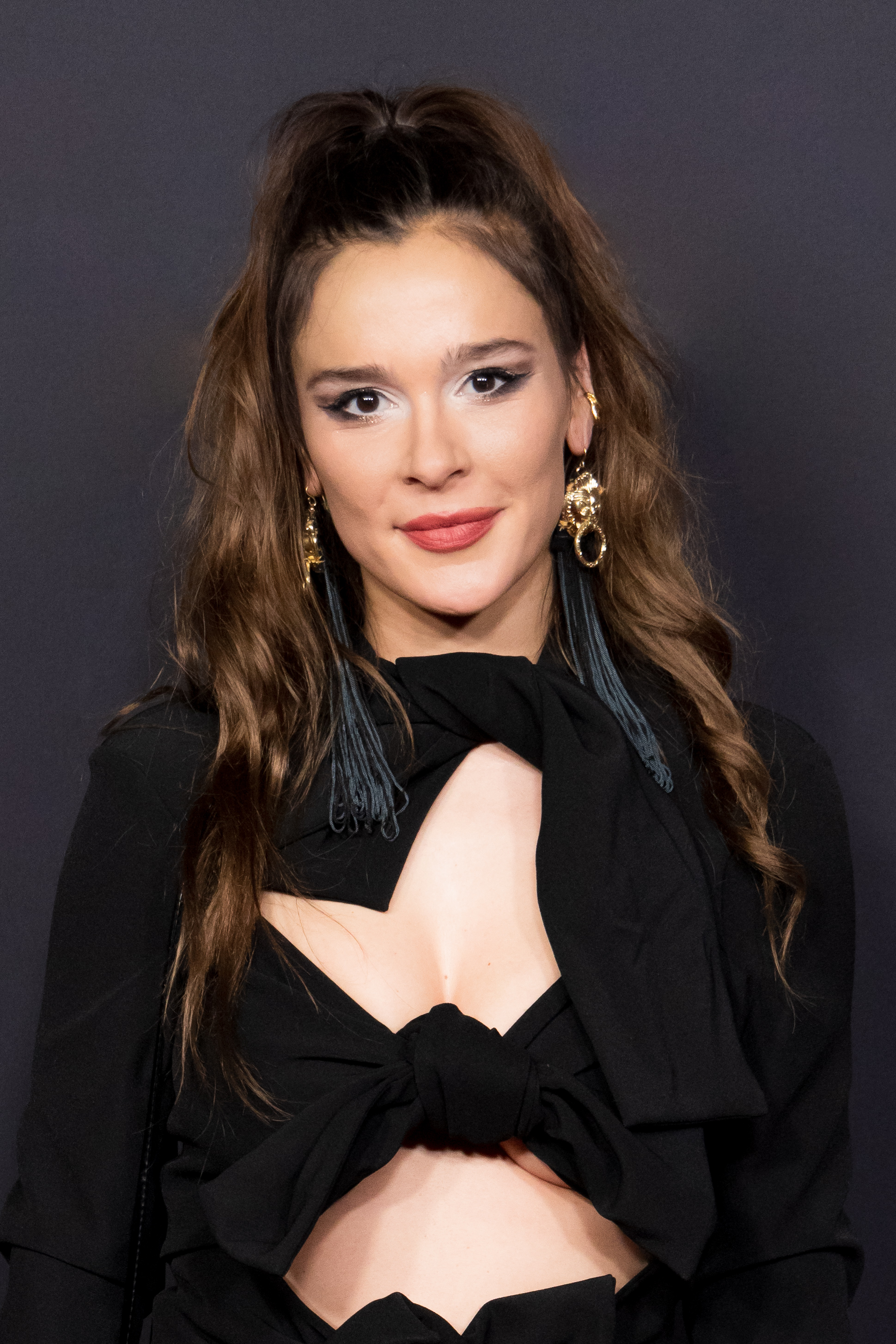
- Dayne in 2024
- Born: Isabelle Knispel; 8 January 1988 (age 38); East Berlin, East Germany
- Occupation: Actress
- Years active: 2009–present
- Partner: Louis Hunter (2017–2024)

Bella Dayne (born Isabelle Knispel, 8 January 1988), is a German actress. Her credits include the television series Plebs, Humans and the BBC/Netflix miniseries Troy: Fall of a City, in which she portrayed Helen of Troy. In 2020 she was cast in the role of Red Spear in the Netflix original show Cursed.

== Early life and career ==
Dayne was born and raised in Berlin. In 2004, at the age of 16, she took part in the Miss East Germany contest.

In 2006, while still in school, she won the Miss Germany competition. She moved to New York City, attending the Stella Adler Studio of Acting. Dayne has also lived in Los Angeles, where she had three jobs simultaneously until she was able to support herself from acting alone. She is known for her role as Astrid in the AMC show Humans, and as Helen of Troy in Troy: Fall of a City, a BBC/Netflix coproduction. Other notable roles are the French-Canadian, Eliette, in Showtime's miniseries Guerrilla and the fierce Guinevere in the TV show Cursed.

== Filmography ==
=== Film ===
Year	Title	Role	Notes
2012	Yellow	Ashley	
2016	Don't Hang Up	Payton	
2017	Sex Guaranteed	Zade	
2021	Kepler X-47	Chrystal	SF short film (11:47) - Director and producer, Erin Li
2023	Girl You Know It's True	Milli	
2024	Bad Director	Grete	

=== Television ===
Year	Title	Role	Notes
2012	American Horror Story	Patsy	1 episode
2014	The Goldbergs	Fanny	1 episode
2015	Person of Interest	Anna Mueller	1 episode
2016	Plebs	Delphine	8 episodes
2016	The Man in the High Castle	Monika	1 episode
2016–2018	Humans	Astrid	Recurring; 10 episodes
2017	Guerrilla	Eliette	2 episodes
2018	Troy: Fall of a City	Helen of Troy	Lead; 8 episodes
2018	Trust	Talitha Getty	2 episodes
2020	Cursed	Red Spear	6 episodes
2022	Tatort: Das Mädchen, das allein nach Haus’ geht	Julie Bolschakow	1 episode
2025	Splinter Cell: Deathwatch	Freya Niemeyer	Voice

=== Web ===
Year	Title	Role	Notes
2011	Level 26: Dark Revelations	Maria	Episode: "Cyber-bridge Four"

=== Video games ===
Year	Title	Role	Notes
2017	Call of Duty: WWII	Camille "Rousseau" Denis	
