= Cookies & Cream (film) =

- Cookies & Cream theatrical poster
- Directed by: Princeton Holt
- Written by: Princeton Holt
- Produced by: Princeton Holt; Brian Ackley
- Starring: Jace Nicole; Ardie Fuqua; Naama Kates; Brian Ackley
- Edited by: Hector Maldonado
- Music by: Damon Dorsey
- Production company: One Way or Another Productions
- Distributed by: Celebrity Video Distribution
- Release date: November 22, 2008
- Running time: 90 minutes
- Country: United States
- Language: English

Cookies & Cream is a 2008 American independent drama film written and directed by Princeton Holt, as his first feature length narrative film.

== Synopsis ==
A single mother accepts an adult entertainment job in order to take care of her daughter and herself. The film examines the effect her choices have on her relationships and on her.

== Cast ==
- Jace Nicole as Carmen
- Ardie Fuqua as Jonathan
- Naama Kates as Jodie
- Brian Ackley as Dylan
- Chris Riquinha as Butch
- Jaylon Nicole Carey-Williams as Candace
- Danny Doherty as Woodrow
- Omar Hernandez as Roderick
- Shannone Holt as Leslie
- Derek M. McAllister as James
- Kent Sutton as Mike

== Production ==
The film was written in 6 days and shot in 24, largely because nearly half of the film had to be reshot when the original cinematographer quit the production after several disagreements with the rest of the production crew. Cinematographer duties were shared with members of the production cast and crew, which explains the fact that there is no individual cinematographer is credited. The film's lead actress Jace Nicole stated that due to her friendship with writer/director Holt, and she having worked with him on his 2006 short film Phish, she did not have to audition for her role as Carmen.

== Reception ==
=== Critical response ===
Salt Lake City Weekly offered that the film was "more thinky than sexy", and Boise Weekly noted it as one of the many "award winning independent films" to screen at the Idaho International Film Festival.

The Independent Critic wrote that the film "is a decidedly different cinematic beast", in its dealing with how a mother maintains her work in the adult industry in order to provide for herself and her daughter. In praising the film, they wrote that the film does not portray stereotypes, and that it is "an intelligent, thoughtful, strange and wonderful film featuring a divinely nuanced and balanced performance." They made note of it not being stereotypical, and compared the film to other non-traditional films such as Kevin Smith's Zack & Miri Make a Porno and Paul Thomas Anderson's Boogie Nights. They summarized that writer/director Princeton Holt "has constructed a creative and intelligent dialogue about a world in which few of us have actual knowledge but most of us are willing to offer opinions. Flying in the face of stereotypes, Holt neither over-sympathizes nor embellishes".

The Critic's Word reviewer made note of this being the first feature film of Princeton Holt. He wrote that as a "character driven piece", the film may at first glance "look and feel like an X-rated skin flick to the viewing eye", but that initial impression is dispelled as the film quickly reveals itself to be "a touching film with a lot of depth and an incredible sense of weight within its story." But he also noted that the film was not without its problems, the first being the "film’s deluge which felt a little drowned out at times and a little like gap fillers for the most part, but nothing too harmful that would seriously hurt the film in any real way though," and the second being the film's audio dubbing which was "off" in certain parts. He also commented that while the pacing might have been too slow for some viewers, it managed to "tell a very adequate story about a young woman living life in its whole realism form." Speaking toward the writer/director, the reviewer wrote "Holt is a breath of fresh air and projects an [sic] unique and somewhat uncanny style of filmmaking that reminded me of the late 80s and early 90s of filmmaking". He also commended the cast when writing "most of the cast did an equally fair job in their performances." In summation he noted that he first viewed the film with low expectations, and was surprised that "the film came out very enjoyable and was a terrific experience."

Sonic Cinema reviewer noted the film's "first scene seems like one of those cheesy online videos you find on certain websites," and also made note of the film's poor ADR, writing there were "few times (a lot of times, in fact) when it threw me out of the movie." But he also made note that "after that introduction, this movie finds its’ [sic] heart". He wrote that the film reminded him "a lot of Zack and Miri Make a Porno, for some obvious reasons, and others not so obvious," offering that "Holt has made an intelligent and compassionate drama" centered on the protagonist's dilemma.

Rogue Cinema also noted how the film's opening minutes created an expectation that it would be a different type of film than what it later revealed. The reviewer wrote that while it might be "a tale about the pornography industry and essentially how it reflects upon the love lives of its performers', that if viewers were expecting an adult industry film, it would leave them disappointed. He complimented the project by writing the film was "Full of fantastic performances from everyone in the cast, a magnificent musical score that creates something dynamic and dramatic from out of nowhere and a very strikingly visual film. It is a very elaborate and poignant look at love that doesn't offer a lot of answers for its questions but it does stay in your mind well after seeing it."

== Release ==
The film premiered in several cities at regional film festivals around the world, and was picked up for distribution within a year of its festival premiere. It was released on DVD on July 20, 2010.

=== Festivals ===
- 2009 New Filmmakers Summer Series NYC, Anthology Film Archives, Official Selection
- 2009 Deep Fried Film Festival, United Kingdom, Official Selection
- 2009 Idaho International Film Festival, Boise, Idaho, Official Selection
- 2009 Birmingham Black International Film Festival, United Kingdom, Official Selection
- 2009 Red Wasp Film Festival, Bryan, TX, Official Selection
- 2009 Outhouse Film Festival, Baton Rouge, LA, Official Selection
- 2009 Sexy International Film Festival, New York City
- 2009 Favorite Film (Sonic Cinema)
- 2009 Favorite Performance - Jace Nicole (Sonic Cinema)
