= List of Lionsgate films (2020–2029) =

This is a list of films produced and/or distributed by Lionsgate Films from 2020 to the present day. Since 1997, about 400 films have been released. As of November 2017, Lionsgate's films grossed approximately $8.2 billion.

== Released ==
Release date	Film	Notes
January 10, 2020	Inherit the Viper	North and Latin American distribution only
January 17, 2020	Intrigo: Death of an Author	North American co-distribution with Grindstone Entertainment Group only
February 25, 2020	Norm of the North: Family Vacation	Direct-to-video; co-production with Splash Entertainment and Assemblage Entertainment
March 13, 2020	I Still Believe	co-production with Kingdom Story Company
May 22, 2020	Survive the Night	co-distribution with Grindstone Entertainment Group only
June 9, 2020	Think Like a Dog	distribution only; produced by M-Star International
June 16, 2020	2 Minutes of Fame	
June 30, 2020	Force of Nature	North American co-distribution with Grindstone Entertainment Group only
August 28, 2020	Rogue	co-distribution with Grindstone Entertainment Group only
September 4, 2020	Guest House	co-distribution with Grindstone Entertainment Group only
September 18, 2020	Antebellum	co-production with QC Entertainment
October 16, 2020	Alone	co-distribution with Grindstone Entertainment Group only
November 20, 2020	Viy 2: Journey to China	co-distribution with Grindstone Entertainment Group only
November 20, 2020	Run	produced by Summit Entertainment and Search Party Productions; distributed by Hulu
December 8, 2020	Smiley Face Killers	North American co-distribution with Grindstone Entertainment Group only
December 11, 2020	Wander Darkly	North American distribution only; produced by ShivHans Pictures and 51 Entertainment
December 15, 2020	Dragon Soldiers	co-distribution with Grindstone Entertainment Group only
December 18, 2020	Fatale	North American, UK, Irish and French distribution under Summit Entertainment only; produced by Hidden Empire Film Group
January 22, 2021	Born a Champion	North American co-distribution with Grindstone Entertainment Group only
January 23, 2021	Adverse	North American co-distribution with Grindstone Entertainment Group only
February 12, 2021	Barb and Star Go to Vista Del Mar	co-production with Gloria Sanchez Productions
February 12, 2021	Fear of Rain	North and Latin American distribution only; produced by Zero Gravity Management
February 19, 2021	Silk Road	North American distribution only; produced by Piccadilly Pictures, High Frequency Entertainment, Perfect Season Productions and Mutressa Movies
March 5, 2021	Chaos Walking	co-production with Quadrant Pictures, Allison Shearmur Productions and 3 Arts Entertainment
March 12, 2021	Dark Web: Cicada 3301	distribution only; produced by Grindstone Entertainment Group
March 19, 2021	The Courier	US, UK and Irish co-distribution with Roadside Attractions only; produced by FilmNation Entertainment, 42 and SunnyMarch
March 30, 2021	The Toll	distribution only; produced by 4AM Films
April 9, 2021	Voyagers	US distribution under Summit Entertainment only; produced by AGC Studios, Fibonacci Films, Freecss Films, Ingenious Media, Thunder Road Films and Nota Bene Films
April 23, 2021	Vanquish	North and Latin American co-distribution with Grindstone Entertainment Group only
April 30, 2021	The Virtuoso	North American, UK and Irish distribution only; produced by 120 dB Films, Double Dutch International and Nazz Productions
May 7, 2021	Above Suspicion	US distribution only; produced by 50 Degrees Entertainment, White Knight Pictures, Colleen Camp Productions and Bold Films
May 14, 2021	Spiral: From the Book of Saw	co-production with Twisted Pictures
May 28, 2021	Endangered Species	co-distribution with Grindstone Entertainment Group only
June 4, 2021	Flashback	co-distribution with Grindstone Entertainment Group only
June 11, 2021	Rock Dog 2: Rock Around the Park	Direct-to-video; produced by Splash Entertainment
June 16, 2021	Hitman's Wife's Bodyguard	US, UK and Irish distribution under Summit Entertainment only; produced by Millennium Media, Nu Boyana Film Studios, Campbell Grobman Films, Film i Väst and Filmgate Films
July 16, 2021	Die in a Gunfight	North American distribution only; produced by Align, Culmination Productions, Jobro Productions and Digital Ignition Entertainment
July 23, 2021	Midnight in the Switchgrass	distribution only; produced by Emmett Furla Oasis Films and The Pimienta Film Co.
August 20, 2021	Habit	co-distribution with Grindstone Entertainment Group only
August 20, 2021	The Protégé	US distribution only; co-production with Millennium Media, Ingenious Media, Fourteen Films, I Road Productions and Campbell Grobman Films
September 3, 2021	The Gateway	North American co-distribution with Grindstone Entertainment Group only
September 10, 2021	Catch the Bullet	co-distribution with Grindstone Entertainment Group only
September 17, 2021	Lady of the Manor	distribution only; produced by Hungry Bull Productions and Digital Caviar
September 28, 2021	C.I.Ape	
October 1, 2021	The Jesus Music	distribution only; produced by Kingdom Story Company, K-Love Films and Southland Studios
October 15, 2021	Needle in a Timestack	distribution only; produced by Bron Studios, Pacific Northwest Pictures and Ember20
October 22, 2021	Warning	North American co-distribution with Grindstone Entertainment Group only
November 5, 2021	Dangerous	distribution only; produced by Benaroya Pictures, Mind's Eye Entertainment and Falconer Pictures
November 19, 2021	Dhamaka	co-production with RSVP Movies, Ram Madhvani Films, Lotte Entertainment, and Globalgate Entertainment; distributed by Netflix
November 19, 2021	Zeros and Ones	North and Latin American co-distribution with Grindstone Entertainment Group only
December 10, 2021	Wrath of Man	UK, Irish and Indian distribution only; produced by Miramax and Toff Guy Films; co-distributed by Prime Video in the UK and Ireland
December 25, 2021	American Underdog	North American distribution only; co-production with Kingdom Story Company
December 28, 2021	The Gardener	North American co-distribution with Grindstone Entertainment Group
January 14, 2022	Shattered	North American co-distribution with Grindstone Entertainment Group only
February 4, 2022	Moonfall	North American distribution under Summit Entertainment only; produced by Huayi Brothers, Tencent Pictures, Centropolis Entertainment, Street Entertainment and AGC Studios
March 22, 2022	Pinocchio: A True Story	Russian film, Direct-to-video
April 22, 2022	The Unbearable Weight of Massive Talent	co-production with Saturn Films and Burr! Productions
April 29, 2022	Fortress: Sniper's Eye	North and Latin American co-distribution with Grindstone Entertainment Group only
May 6, 2022	Escape the Field	North American, UK and Irish distribution only; produced by Anacapa Pictures
May 13, 2022	Private Property	
May 27, 2022	Zero Contact	North American co-distribution with Grindstone Entertainment Group only
June 17, 2022	Mid-Century	North American co-distribution with Grindstone Entertainment Group only
July 1, 2022	Hot Seat	North and Latin American co-distribution with Grindstone Entertainment Group only
July 15, 2022	1Up	produced by BuzzFeed Studios; distributed by Amazon Studios
August 12, 2022	Fall	US distribution only; produced by Tea Shop Productions and Capstone Studios
September 2, 2022	Wire Room	North and Latin American co-distribution with Grindstone Entertainment Group only
September 13, 2022	Clerks III	distribution only; produced by View Askew Productions
September 30, 2022	The Good House	North American co-distribution with Roadside Attractions only; produced by DreamWorks Pictures, Participant, Reliance Entertainment, FilmNation Entertainment and Faliro House
October 21, 2022	Detective Knight: Rogue	distribution only; produced by Emmett/Furla Oasis and Buffalo 8 Productions
October 28, 2022	Prey for the Devil	co-production with Gold Circle Films
November 18, 2022	Lamborghini: The Man Behind the Legend	North American co-distribution with Grindstone Entertainment Group only
December 9, 2022	Detective Knight: Redemption	distribution only; produced by Emmett/Furla Oasis and Buffalo 8 Productions
December 30, 2022	Alice, Darling	distribution outside Canada only; produced by Babe Nation Films, Elevation Pictures, Ontario Creates and Castelletto Films
January 13, 2023	Plane	North and Latin American, UK, Irish and Indian distribution only; produced by MadRiver Pictures, Olive Hill Media, Di Bonaventura Pictures and G-BASE
January 20, 2023	Detective Knight: Independence	distribution only; produced by Emmett/Furla Oasis and Buffalo 8 Productions
January 24, 2023	Rock Dog 3: Battle the Beat	Direct-to-video; produced by Splash Entertainment
January 27, 2023	Shotgun Wedding	produced by Summit Entertainment, Mandeville Films, Nuyorican Productions, and Maximum Effort; distributed by Amazon Studios
February 24, 2023	Jesus Revolution	North American distribution only; co-production with Kingdom Story Company
March 3, 2023	Operation Fortune: Ruse de Guerre	US distribution only; produced by Miramax, STXfilms and Toff Guy
March 24, 2023	John Wick: Chapter 4	distribution only; produced by Summit Entertainment, Thunder Road Pictures, and 87Eleven Productions
April 28, 2023	Are You There God? It's Me, Margaret.	co-production with Gracie Films
April 28, 2023	Sisu	North American distribution only; produced by Stage 6 Films, Subzero Film Entertainment and Good Chaos
May 5, 2023	One Ranger	distribution only; produced by Renegade Entertainment
May 26, 2023	About My Father	co-production with Depth of Field
June 16, 2023	The Blackening	North American distribution only; produced by MRC, The Story Company, Tracy Yvonne Productions, Artists First and Catchlight Studios
July 7, 2023	Joy Ride	co-production with Point Grey Pictures and Red Mysterious Hippo
July 21, 2023	Cobweb	co-production with Point Grey Pictures and Vertigo Entertainment
August 4, 2023	Corner Office	US co-distribution with Grindstone Entertainment Group only
August 25, 2023	Retribution	North American and Indian co-distribution with Roadside Attractions only; produced by StudioCanal, The Picture Company, Ombra Films, TF1 Films Production and Studio Babelsberg
September 22, 2023	Expend4bles	North American, UK and Irish distribution only; produced by Millennium Media, Templeton Media, Grobman Films
September 29, 2023	Saw X	co-production with Twisted Pictures
October 6, 2023	Desperation Road	North American co-distribution with Grindstone Entertainment Group only
October 13, 2023	Dear David	distribution only; produced by BuzzFeed Studios
November 3, 2023	The Marsh King's Daughter	US co-distribution with Roadside Attractions only; produced by STXfilms, Black Bear Pictures and Anonymous Content
November 10, 2023	Manodrome	North American co-distribution with Grindstone Entertainment Group only
November 17, 2023	The Hunger Games: The Ballad of Songbirds & Snakes	co-production with Color Force and About:Blank
December 1, 2023	Silent Night	North American distribution only; produced by Capstone Global, Thunder Road Films, Capstone Studios and A Better Tomorrow Films
January 19, 2024	Sunrise	North American co-distribution with Grindstone Entertainment Group only
January 26, 2024	Miller's Girl	co-production with Good Universe and Point Grey Pictures
February 2, 2024	Scrambled	co-distribution with Roadside Attractions; only; produced by Megamix
February 23, 2024	Ordinary Angels	North American distribution only; co-production with Vertigo Entertainment, Stampede Ventures and Kingdom Story Company
March 8, 2024	Imaginary	co-production with Blumhouse Productions and Tower of Babble
March 15, 2024	Arthur the King	US distribution only; produced by eOne Films, Tucker Tooley Entertainment, Canton Entertainment and Municipal Pictures
April 5, 2024	Strictly Confidential	North and Latin American co-distribution with Grindstone Entertainment Group only
April 12, 2024	Damaged	North and Latin American co-distribution with Grindstone Entertainment Group only
April 19, 2024	The Ministry of Ungentlemanly Warfare	US distribution only; produced by Black Bear Pictures, Jerry Bruckheimer Films and Toff Guy
April 26, 2024	Boy Kills World	US, Latin American and Indian co-distribution with Roadside Attractions only; produced by Nthibah Pictures, Raimi Productions, Capstone Studios, Vertigo Entertainment and Hammerstone Studios
April 26, 2024	Dancing Village: The Curse Begins	US distribution only; produced by MD Pictures
April 26, 2024	Unsung Hero	North American distribution only; co-production with Kingdom Story Company and Candy Rock Entertainment
May 17, 2024	The Strangers: Chapter 1	distribution only; produced by Fifth Element Productions, Stream Media, Sherborne Media and LipSync
May 17, 2024	You Can't Run Forever	North American co-distribution with Grindstone Entertainment Group only
May 28, 2024	The Legend of Catclaws Mountain	distribution only; produced by Magic Arrow Films
June 7, 2024	Longing	US co-distribution with Grindstone Entertainment Group only
June 14, 2024	Latency	co-distribution with Grindstone Entertainment Group only
June 18, 2024	A Stork's Journey 2	
June 21, 2024	Blackwater Lane	North American co-distribution with Grindstone Entertainment Group only
June 28, 2024	Reunion	co-distribution with Republic Pictures only; produced by Spyglass Media Group, Artists Road and Unique Features
July 4, 2024	Kill	North American, UK and Irish co-distribution with Roadside Attractions only; produced by Dharma Productions and Sikhya Entertainment
July 5, 2024	Boneyard	distribution only; produced by Flix Financial, Dream Team Productions and Busy Day Productions
July 19, 2024	The Abandon	distribution only; produced by Mill House Motion Pictures
July 19, 2024	Clear Cut	co-distribution with Grindstone Entertainment Group only
July 31, 2024	The Duel	co-distribution in North and Latin America, the UK, Ireland, Australia, New Zealand and South Africa with Grindstone Entertainment Group only
August 9, 2024	Borderlands	distribution only; produced by Summit Entertainment, Arad Productions, Picturestart, Gearbox Studios and 2K
August 16, 2024	Crescent City	North American co-distribution with Grindstone Entertainment Group only
August 23, 2024	The Crow	US distribution only; produced by FilmNation Entertainment, Hassell Free Productions, The Electric Shadow Company, Davis Films, Pressman Film and 30West
August 23, 2024	Greedy People	North American, Indian and Filipino distribution excluding airlines only; produced by Limelight and Boies Schiller Entertainment
August 30, 2024	1992	US distribution only; produced by Kodiak Pictures, Trident Films, Sumatra Films and Death Row Pictures
September 6, 2024	Continue	co-distribution with Grindstone Entertainment Group only
September 13, 2024	The Killer's Game	US distribution only; produced by Mad Chance Productions, Endurance Media, Dogbone Entertainment, K.Jam Media and LipSync
September 20, 2024	Bagman	distribution only; produced by Temple Hill Entertainment
September 20, 2024	Never Let Go	distribution only; produced by Summit Entertainment, 21 Laps Entertainment and HalleHolly
September 27, 2024	Amber Alert	distribution only; produced by Hungry Bull Productions and Bluefields Entertainment
September 27, 2024	Megalopolis	North American theatrical distribution only; produced by American Zoetrope
October 4, 2024	White Bird	co-production with Participant, Kingdom Story Company, Mandeville Films and 2DUX² Productions
October 29, 2024	Amityville: Where the Echo Lives	co-distribution with Grindstone Entertainment Group only
November 8, 2024	The Best Christmas Pageant Ever	co-production with Kingdom Story Company, Lumenas Studios and FletChet Entertainment
November 8, 2024	Small Things Like These	North American, U.K. and Irish distribution only; produced by Artists Equity and Big Things Films; co-distributed in North America by Roadside Attractions
November 22, 2024	Armor	co-distribution with Grindstone Entertainment Group only
December 13, 2024	Dirty Angels	US, UK and Irish distribution only; produced by Millennium Media, Signature Pictures and Nu Boyana Film Studios
January 10, 2025	Den of Thieves 2: Pantera	distribution only; produced by eOne Films, Tucker Tooley Entertainment, and G-BASE
January 17, 2025	Alarum	co-distribution with Grindstone Entertainment Group only
January 17, 2025	Wish You Were Here	North American co-distribution with Grindstone Entertainment Group only
January 24, 2025	Flight Risk	co-production with Hammerstone Studios, Icon Productions and Davis Entertainment
January 31, 2025	Like Father Like Son	co-distribution with Grindstone Entertainment Group only
February 21, 2025	The Unbreakable Boy	co-production with Kingdom Story Company
March 7, 2025	F*** Marry Kill	distribution only; produced by BuzzFeed Studios
April 4, 2025	Freaky Tales	distribution only; produced by eOne Films and MACRO
April 11, 2025	Gunslingers	co-distribution with Grindstone Entertainment Group only
April 29, 2025	Big Freaking Rat	co-distribution with Grindstone Entertainment Group only
May 1, 2025	Another Simple Favor	co-production with Metro-Goldwyn-Mayer, Feigco Entertainment, Bron Studios and Creative Wealth Media; distributed by Amazon MGM Studios
May 2, 2025	The Surfer	North American co-distribution with Roadside Attractions only; produced by Tea Shop Productions, Arenamedia, Lovely Productions and Gramercy Park Media
May 9, 2025	Shadow Force	co-production with Made With Love Media, Simpson Street and Indian Meadows Productions
May 16, 2025	A Breed Apart	distribution only; produced by Curmudgeon Films, and Daro Film Distribution
May 16, 2025	Hurry Up Tomorrow	distribution only; produced by Manic Phase and Live Nation Productions
June 6, 2025	Ballerina	distribution only; produced by Summit Entertainment, Thunder Road Films and 87North Productions
June 13, 2025	Diablo	North American co-distribution with Grindstone Entertainment Group only; produced by Ágora Films, Film Mode Entertainment, Wonder Street and Buffalo 8 Productions
June 20, 2025	Everything's Going to Be Great	distribution only; produced by eOne Films, Amaze Film & Television, and Screen Arcade
June 27, 2025	Off the Grid	North American co-distribution with Grindstone Entertainment Group only; produced by Latigo Films, Eyevox Entertainment, Lady Bacardi Media, March On Productions, and Red Sea Media
July 25, 2025	The Home	US co-distribution with Roadside Attractions only; produced by Miramax, BlockFilm and Man in a Tree
August 1, 2025	She Rides Shotgun	US distribution only; produced by Fifth Season, Makeready, Waypoint Entertainment, and Super Frog
August 15, 2025	Americana	distribution only; produced by Bron Studios, Saks Picture Company, Rhea Films, Hercules Film Fund and Creative Wealth Media
September 5, 2025	Twinless	US co-distribution with Roadside Attractions only; produced by Republic Pictures, Permut Presentations and TPC
September 12, 2025	The Long Walk	co-production with Vertigo Entertainment and About:Blank
September 26, 2025	The Strangers – Chapter 2	distribution only; produced by Fifth Element Productions and Frame Film
October 10, 2025	Kiss of the Spider Woman	North American and Indian distribution only; produced by Artists Equity, Mohari Media, Nuyorican Productions, Josephson Entertainment, Tom Kirdahy Productions and 1000 Eyes; co-distributed with Roadside Attractions and LD Entertainment in North America
October 10, 2025	Fairyland	US co-distribution with Willa only; produced by American Zoetrope
October 17, 2025	Good Fortune	co-production with Garam Films, Oh Brudder Productions, Keep Your Head and Yang Pictures
October 29, 2025	Anniversary	co-distribution with Roadside Attractions only; produced by Fifth Season, Chockstone Pictures, Churchill Films and Metropolitan Films International
November 7, 2025	I Wish You All the Best	distribution only; produced by Ace Entertainment and TeaShop Films
November 14, 2025	Now You See Me: Now You Don't	distribution only; produced by Summit Entertainment and Secret Hideout
December 5, 2025	Kill Bill: The Whole Bloody Affair	distribution only; produced by A Band Apart
December 12, 2025	Dust Bunny	co-distribution with Roadside Attractions only
December 19, 2025	The Housemaid	co-production with Hidden Pictures and Pretty Dangerous Pictures
January 9, 2026	Greenland 2: Migration	US distribution only; produced by STXfilms, Anton, Thunder Road Films and G-BASE Film Production
January 16, 2026	Killer Whale	North American co-distribution with Grindstone Entertainment Group only; produced by Jaggi Entertainment and Head Gear Films
February 6, 2026	The Strangers – Chapter 3	distribution only; produced by Fifth Element Productions and Frame Film
February 20, 2026	I Can Only Imagine 2	co-production with Kingdom Story Company, LD Entertainment, Mission Pictures International, Kevin Downes Productions and Erwin Brothers Entertainment
February 20, 2026	The Dreadful	North American co-distribution with Grindstone Entertainment Group only; produced by Black Magic, Redwire Pictures/Tunnel and Storyboard Media
March 6, 2026	War Machine	co-production with Hidden Pictures, Range Media Partners and Huge Film; distributed by Netflix
March 13, 2026	The Gates	distribution only; produced by Indy Entertainment, Core 4 Films and Rebellium Films
March 20, 2026	Do Not Enter	co-production with Suretone Pictures
April 10, 2026	Beast	North American co-distribution with Grindstone Entertainment Group only; produced by ONE Championship
April 24, 2026	Michael	North American, Russian and Japanese distribution only; co-production with Universal Pictures, GK Films, and Optimum Productions
May 29, 2026	Power Ballad	North American, U.K. and Irish distribution only; produced by Likely Story, 30West, Screen Ireland and Treasure Entertainment
June 12, 2026	The Furious	distribution outside China and Hong Kong only; produced by Edko Films and XYZ Films
July 29, 2026	The Devil's Mouth	co-production with Thunder Road Films; distributed by Amazon MGM Studios
August 21, 2026	Mutiny	North American distribution only; produced by MadRiver Pictures and Punch Palace Productions
August 26, 2026	Toxic	English-language distribution and North American co-distribution with Prime Media only; produced by KVN Productions and Monster Mind Creations
September 2, 2026	Fall 2: Deadpoint	North American co-distribution with Grindstone Entertainment Group only; co-production with Tea Shop Productions, Capstone Pictures, and Flawless Productions Inc.
October 2, 2026	Beware Boiúna	North American distribution only; produced by Constantin Film and JB Pictures
November 20, 2026	The Hunger Games: Sunrise on the Reaping	co-production with Color Force

== Upcoming ==
Release date	Film	Notes	Production status
December 4, 2026	Above the Below	co-production with Future Artists Entertainment	Completed
February 5, 2027	Karoshi	co-production with 87Eleven Entertainment	Completed
March 26, 2027	Day Drinker	distribution only; produced by Thunder Road Films and Infinitum Nihil	Post-production
May 6, 2027	The Resurrection of the Christ: Part One	co-production with Icon Productions	Post-production
June 4, 2027	John Rambo	co-production with Millennium Media, Templeton Media, Bonfire Legend, and AGBO	Post-production
September 24, 2027	Blair Witch Project	co-production with Blumhouse Atomic and Divide/Conquer	Pre-production
December 17, 2027	The Housemaid's Secret	co-production with Hidden Pictures and Pretty Dangerous Pictures	Pre-production
May 25, 2028	The Resurrection of the Christ: Part Two	co-production with Icon Productions	Post-production

=== Undated films ===
Release date	Film	Notes	Production status
2026	Golden State Killer	US co-distribution with Grindstone Entertainment Group only	Completed
2027	47 Meters Down: The Wreck	North American distribution only; produced by Allen Media Group and Tea Shop Productions	Post-production
2027	The Best Is Yet to Come	co-production with MRC, Gidden Media and Chapter 2	Post-production
2027	Caine	co-production with Thunder Road Films and 87Eleven Entertainment	Post-production
2027	A Head Full of Ghosts	co-production with Team Downey, The Allegiance Theater, and Fifth Season	Post-production
2027	Monkey Quest	co-production with Toei Animation and Sola Digital Arts	Post-production
2027	Orphans	international distribution only; produced by Dark Castle Entertainment, Eagle Vision and Gnosis Moving Pictures	Post-production
2027	Untitled home invasion thriller film	co-production with Midnight Pictures	Post-production
2027	The Jesus Generation	co-production with Kingdom Story Company and Forrest Frank	Pre-production
TBA	Portrait of God	co-production with Ghost House Pictures, Monkeypaw Productions and NAT20 Films	Pre-production
TBA	Fairytale of New York	distributed by Netflix; co-production with FlynnPictureCo. and Templeton Media	Pre-production
TBA	Naruto	North American distribution only; co-production with Sony Pictures, Arad Productions and Hisako	Pre-production
TBA	Unforgettable		Pre-production
TBA	Saw	co-production with Blumhouse Atomic	Pre-production
TBA	Michael 2	distribution only; co-production with Universal Pictures, GK Films, and Optimum Productions	Pre-production
TBA	Untitled animated John Wick prequel film	co-production with Thunder Road Films, 87North Productions, and Point Grey	Pre-production
TBA	Wet	co-production with Fifth Season, 193 and Linden Entertainment	Pre-production
TBA	Mommy's Home	co-production with Anonymous Content and Mångata	Pre-production
TBA	My Jesus	co-production with Kingdom Story Company and Capitol Christian Music Group	Filming

=== In development ===
Film	Notes
48 Hours in Vegas	co-production with Lord Miller
All of Her	co-production with Metronome Film Company and Nine Muses Entertainment
Big Bad	co-production with Hidden Pictures
Boxman	co-production with 42 and Range Media Partners
Carry Me to My Grave	co-production with 12:01 Films
The Correspondent	co-production with Hidden Pictures
The Death Roll	co-production with Barnstorm and Chasing Epic Pictures
Fascinating Rhythm	co-production with Fifth Season
Free Agents	co-production with Hidden Empire Film Group
The Girl Who Loved Tom Gordon	co-production with Vertigo Entertainment
John Wick: Chapter 5	distribution only; produced by Summit Entertainment, Thunder Road Films and 87North Productions
The Last Witch Hunter 2	co-production with Grindstone Entertainment Group and One Race Films
Leprechaun	co-production with Koulest Productions
Loose Cannons	co-production with 87North Productions
Magic	co-production with Raimi Productions and Vertigo Entertainment
Monopoly	co-production with Hasbro Entertainment, eOne Films and LuckyChap Entertainment
The Professionals	co-production with 87North Productions and Mandalay Pictures
Outlast	co-production with Red Barrels
Rabbids	co-production with Ubisoft Film & Television, Mandeville Films and Stoopid Buddy Stoodios
Rats!	co-production with FiveTen Productions and Fishbach Productions
The Reckoner	co-production with AGBO and Estuary Films
Renegotiate	co-production with CineMachine and Range Media Partners
Ride or Die	co-production with Ugly Baby and Original Film
Riders of Justice	co-production with 21 Laps Entertainment
Run the Night	co-production with Hidden Pictures and Barry Linen
Streets of Rage	co-production with Sega Sammy Group, Story Kitchen and Escape Artists
Sunflower	co-production with Bread & Circuses Entertainment
The Survival List	
Tortures of the Damned	co-production with Ghost House Pictures
Untitled American Psycho remake	co-production with Frenesy Film Company and Pressman Film
Untitled fourth Now You See Me film	distribution only; produced by Summit Entertainment and Secret Hideout
Untitled The Blackening sequel	co-production with MRC
Undercover	co-production with Mandeville Films
Wayland	co-production with Genre Films and Freckle Films
West Pointer	
