= Jesus Revolution =

2023 film directed by Jon Erwin and Brent McCorkle

- Theatrical release poster
- Directed by: Jon Erwin; Brent McCorkle
- Screenplay by: Jon Gunn; Jon Erwin
- Based on: Jesus Revolution by Greg Laurie; Ellen Santilli Vaughn
- Produced by: Kevin Downes; Jon Erwin; Andrew Erwin; Daryl Lefever; Josh Walsh; Jerilyn Esquibel; Katelyn Botsch; Bekah Hubbell
- Starring: Joel Courtney; Jonathan Roumie; Kimberly Williams-Paisley; Anna Grace Barlow; Kelsey Grammer
- Cinematography: Akis Konstantakopoulos
- Edited by: John Pucket
- Music by: Brent McCorkle
- Production company: Kingdom Story Company
- Distributed by: Lionsgate
- Release dates: February 15, 2023 (TCL Chinese Theatre); February 24, 2023 (United States)
- Running time: 120 minutes
- Country: United States
- Language: English
- Budget: $15 million
- Box office: $54.3 million

Jesus Revolution is a 2023 American Christian drama film directed by Jon Erwin and Brent McCorkle. Based on the autobiographical book of the same name co-written by Greg Laurie, the film follows the teenage Laurie (Joel Courtney), Christian hippie Lonnie Frisbee (Jonathan Roumie), and pastor Chuck Smith (Kelsey Grammer) as they take part in the Jesus movement in California during the late 1960s. Anna Grace Barlow and Kimberly Williams-Paisley also star.

The film was theatrically released in the United States by Lionsgate on February 24, 2023. Although it received mixed reviews from critics, the film grossed $54 million worldwide against a production budget of $15 million.

== Plot ==
In 1968, the stern yet respected Southern California pastor Chuck Smith realizes his church, Calvary Chapel, is slowly dying and he is unable to connect with the younger, live-free hippie generation of teens and young adults. His daughter, Janette, gives a ride to a colorful hippie hitchhiker named Lonnie Frisbee, who says he is traveling around and telling people about the ministry of Jesus. Smith, at first suspicious of Frisbee, eventually warms up to him and welcomes him to his church and his home. To the dismay of Chuck and his wife, more hippies soon arrive at the Smith house. After Lonnie introduces Chuck to a newly-formed band called Love Song, and the group performs a song in his living room, Chuck develops a new attitude toward the young people. He and Lonnie end up joining forces and start a successful movement to evangelize hippies and other youth.

Meanwhile, high-school student Greg Laurie runs away from his Junior Reserve Officers' Training Corps class and joins a girl named Cathe and her friends, who "turn him on" to drugs at a Janis Joplin concert. At the concert, Timothy Leary is seen preaching the value of LSD for self-discovery. However, Greg sees that various hippies are dangerously irresponsible; at one point, Cathe's sister gets sick from a drug overdose. When watching a movie, Cathe gets angry at Greg for not caring about the dangers of drugs and ends their friendship. They reconcile the next day, with Cathe telling Greg she found Lonnie's church and he should attend with her. After getting baptized at Pirates Cove, Greg and Cathe find solace at Smith's and Frisbee's church, though Cathe's establishment and conservative parents are not enthusiastic about Greg.

The ministry explodes in popularity, being seen as a "Jesus Revolution" and the young attendees as "Jesus freaks". Christian conversions and group baptisms in the Pacific Ocean follow as membership at Calvary Chapel grows to such proportions that services have to be held outside under a large tent. Time magazine does a cover story on the movement in 1971, and both Lonnie and Chuck are featured on Kathryn Kuhlman's weekly television show. Lonnie and his wife, Connie, start having difficulties in their marriage, and Lonnie believes Chuck is trying to diminish his contribution to their joint ministry. Lonnie eventually leaves for Florida with Connie after increasing disagreement with Chuck. Before Lonnie's departure, Greg offers to take over a ministry branch of Calvary chapel in Riverside. He eventually marries Cathe and becomes a pastor of his own church, which becomes Harvest Fellowship. At the end of the film, the credits reveal that Smith and Frisbee reconciled and both are remembered as founders of and leaders in the widespread Jesus movement that started at Calvary Chapel.

== Cast ==
- Joel Courtney as Greg Laurie
  - Jackson Robert Scott as young Greg Laurie
- Jonathan Roumie as Lonnie Frisbee
- Kimberly Williams-Paisley as Charlene Laurie, Greg's mother
- Anna Grace Barlow as Cathe Martin, Greg's love interest
- Kelsey Grammer as Chuck Smith
- Nic Bishop as Dick
- Nicholas Cirillo as Charlie
- Ally Ioannides as Janette Smith, Chuck and Kay's daughter
- Julia Campbell as Kay Smith, Chuck's wife
- Mina Sundwall as Dodie
- DeVon Franklin as Josiah
- Charlie Morgan Patton as Connie Frisbee, Lonnie's wife
- Jolie Jenkins as Pilar
- Shaun Weiss as Vietnam Vet

== Production ==
The film was announced in June 2018, with Jon Erwin and Jon Gunn writing the screenplay, Gunn directing, and Greg Laurie, Kevin Downes, and the Erwin Brothers producing. Jim Gaffigan and Joel Courtney signed on in the lead roles in June 2020, although Kelsey Grammer eventually replaced Gaffigan. Filming occurred in Mobile, Alabama, in March 2022, with several other scenes being shot on-location in California.

== Release ==
The film had its premiere at the TCL Chinese Theatre in Los Angeles on February 15, 2023, and was theatrically released in the United States on February 24, 2023, by Lionsgate. The film was released internationally, starting in Singapore on March 23, 2023, with Indonesia, Australia, New Zealand, and other countries set for release in the subsequent months.

=== Home media ===
Jesus Revolution was released for VOD on April 11, 2023, followed by a Blu-ray and DVD release on April 25, 2023.

== Reception ==
=== Box office ===
In the United States and Canada, Jesus Revolution was released alongside Cocaine Bear, and was initially projected to gross $6–7 million from 2,475 theaters in its opening weekend. The film made $7 million on its first day (including $3.3 million from previews from the days leading up to its release), raising weekend estimates to $14 million. It went on to debut with $15.8 million, finishing in third place. In its second weekend it made $8.7 million, continuing to outperform expectations, finishing in fifth place. In its third and fourth weekends the film made $5.1 million and $3.5 million, respectively, to pass $40 million and briefly become the highest-grossing Lionsgate movie since 2019. The film eventually passed $50 million.

=== Critical response ===
The film received mixed reviews from critics. On the review aggregator website Rotten Tomatoes, 54% of 58 critics' reviews are positive, with an average rating of 5.8/10. The website's consensus reads: "Jesus Revolution fumbles an opportunity to bring fascinating real-life history vibrantly to life, but deserves credit for avoiding the preachiness common to faith-based films." Metacritic, which uses a weighted average, assigned the film a score of 46 out of 100, based on 7 critics, indicating "mixed or average" reviews. Audiences surveyed by CinemaScore gave the film an average grade of "A+", giving director Jon Erwin the most films to earn the grade (following 2015's Woodlawn, 2018's I Can Only Imagine and 2021's American Underdog). Those polled by PostTrak gave it a 97% positive score, with 89% saying they would definitely recommend the film.

Joshua Encinias of MovieMaker attributed its positive reception among audiences to "high production values and a storyline that works even if you don't care about Christianity." Rahul Malhotra and Simbiat Ayoola of Collider noted that Christian media is an "underserved audience", that "the production company did its due diligence to create buzz", and "despite mixed critical reviews, Jesus Revolution has proven to be rather popular with its target demographic." Michael Foust of Crosswalk gave it 5 out of 5 stars, writing that "although the script carries the film, the cast makes it believable." Noting that Jonathan Roumie is best known for his portrayal of Jesus in The Chosen, Foust added, "it doesn't take long to put that in the back of your mind and imagine him as Frisbee."

Dennis Harvey of Variety gave the film a positive review, saying the film is "polished and persuasive without getting too preachy." In another review, James Berardinelli said that "Jesus Revolution takes a fascinating period of American history – the hippie movement and its associated fallout within the Christian community – and transforms it into a bland, TV movie-of-the-week experience." Film Threat writer Alan Ng gave the film an 8/10, saying, "I associate three things with faith-based films: bad acting, an outrageous, overly positive message, and a shoe-horned sermon. Thankfully, this film avoids all three elements." Nell Minow of RogerEbert.com gave the film 2 stars, pointing out that the film skips details like one of its real-life characters' substance abuse and homosexuality, and quoted Jack Kornfield saying "after the ecstasy comes the laundry." Kathy Schiffer of the National Catholic Register noted, "If you're old enough to remember the 1960s and '70s, you'll find Lionsgate's upbeat new film Jesus Revolution to be a walk down memory lane... As a mainstream Christian film, it focuses on a feel-good faith message, which is more than welcome amid today's culture."

== Awards and nominations ==
Award	Date of ceremony	Category	Recipients	Result
Dove Awards	October 17, 2023	Inspirational Film of the Year	Jesus Revolution	Won
Movieguide Awards	March 7, 2024	Best Movie for Mature Audiences	Jesus Revolution	Won
