= Greg Laurie =

American author and pastor (born 1952)

Pastor Greg Laurie
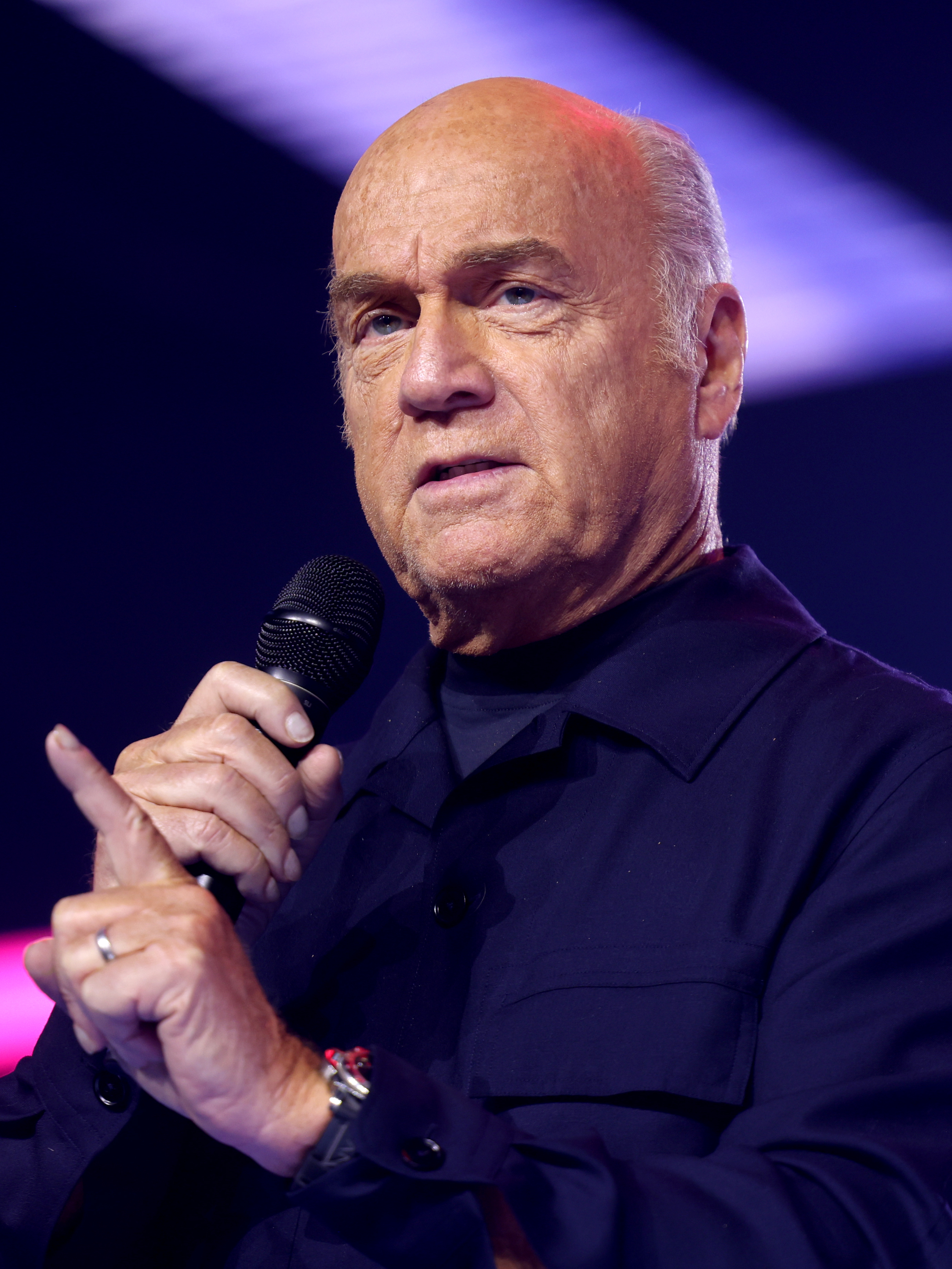
- Laurie in 2025
- Born: December 10, 1952 (age 73); Long Beach, California, U.S.
- Occupations: Christian pastor, evangelist, author, law enforcement chaplain
- Employer: Harvest Christian Fellowship
- Known for: Harvest Crusades
- Title: Senior Pastor
- Spouse: Cathe Martin (m. 1974)
- Children: 2
- Website: www.harvest.org

Greg Laurie (born December 10, 1952) is an American evangelical pastor, evangelist, and Christian author, who as of July 2026 had continued to lead his congregation and serve as a crusade leader, in the role of senior pastor of Harvest Christian Fellowship, Riverside, California. He also is the founder of Harvest Crusades. Laurie is also the subject of the 2023 film Jesus Revolution, which tells the story of how he converted to Christianity and got his start in ministry in the midst of the Jesus movement.

== Early life and education ==
Greg Laurie was born in 1952, in Long Beach, California. He was raised by a single mother who was married seven times in total. He worked as a newspaper boy for the Daily Pilot in Orange County, California. Laurie was not raised in the Christian faith or a church environment; in 1970, when Laurie was 17 years old (while attending Newport Harbor High School), he became a Christian as a result of the ministry of evangelist Lonnie Frisbee, in a period when the Jesus Movement was exploding in Southern California.

== Career ==
=== Harvest Christian Fellowship ===
In 1973, Laurie began a home Bible study in Riverside, California, an opportunity given to him, at age 20, to lead 30 people under the mentorship of Calvary Chapel pastor Chuck Smith. The group quickly grew in size, and Laurie founded the Harvest Christian Fellowship in that same year, in Riverside, where, as of March 2013 (40 years later), he still served as senior pastor. In 1990, Laurie founded the Harvest Crusades, an organization that hosts large-scale evangelistic events around the U.S. As David Olson noted on the occasion of the organization's 25th anniversary crusade at Angel Stadium of Anaheim, California, the organization began its "Harvest America" program in 2012, in which "people from across the country [can] watch a crusade live in a church or other venue via high-quality Internet streams and satellite feeds".

==== HCF affiliation ====
As of June 2017, Harvest Christian Fellowship was maintaining its ties with "the Calvary Chapel association of evangelical churches". In June of that year, Harvest "officially joined the Southern Baptist Convention" (SBC) under Laurie's leadership, after a first-time, 2017 collaborative participation in the "Crossover Phoenix" evangelistic event of the SBC's North American Mission Board. Also noted in reporting was the fact that two days after Harvest America held a large - and what it considered a very successful - crusade at the University of Phoenix Stadium, the SBC began its 2017 annual meeting in Phoenix as well. As Samual Smith noted in reporting in the Christian Post, the reason for the decision by Laurie and the leadership at Harvest to affiliate with SBC was "to... work toward the ultimate [common] goals of 'national revival' and a 'great awakening'. Even with the new affiliation, Lurie "vowed to continue working with Christians from 'nearly every other denomination'".

=== Harvest at Home ===
When all California churches were forced temporarily to shut their doors because of COVID-19, Harvest Christian Fellowship and Greg Laurie started the online church program "Harvest at Home".

On Palm Sunday 2020, then-president Trump tweeted that he would be watching Harvest at Home, and the webcast saw record viewership that week, with over 1,300,000 people tuning in to watch.

On October 5, 2020, Laurie revealed that he had contracted COVID-19, and released a statement saying, "Unfortunately, the coronavirus has become very politicized. I wish we could all set aside our partisan ideas and pull together to do everything we can to defeat this virus and bring our nation back."

=== Other ministry responsibilities ===
In 2013, Laurie served as the Honorary Chairman of the National Day of Prayer Task Force. President Donald Trump selected Pastor Laurie as one of several evangelical church leaders to participate in the National Prayer Service hosted at the Washington National Cathedral following the presidential inauguration of 2017.

In 2017, Greg Laurie organized a movement titled "The Year of Good News". Multiple church leaders signed the letter he penned to initiate the movement. One paragraph of the letter reads, "In a time of fake news, distracting news, divisive news, disorderly news, and, sometimes, depressing news, we - as Christians and as leaders - want to recommit ourselves to making sure that the Good News of Jesus cuts through it all. We call upon Christians in America to make 2017 'The Year of Good News.'"

As of 2006, Laurie was serving on the board of directors for the Billy Graham Evangelistic Association. As of this date, it was being reported that Laurie had served as a chaplain for the Newport Beach Police Department for over 25 years. As of 2013, Laurie was serving as chaplain for the Costa Mesa Police Department.

== Controversy ==
In September 2025, lawsuits were filed against Laurie and Harvest Christian Fellowship alleging sexual abuse at an orphanage in Romania that the church had sponsored, allegations that included child rape and sex trafficking. Without denying that the abuse had taken place, the church responded, e.g., in a statement to Christianity Today, that the legal action was a "misplaced lawsuit wrongly target[ing] Harvest and our pastor"; calling the allegations "serious and disturbing", the church statement argued that "the target... should be the alleged perpetrator, not our church", and further argued that the lawsuits aimed at sensationalising the matter, constituting "a form of financial extortion". The law firm that had filed the lawsuits, representing the alleged victims of the abuse, responded with a rebuttal of the church's statement.

== Media ==
=== Published works ===
As of 2024 Laurie has written more than 70 books.

==== Works authored ====
- Laurie, Greg; Kopp, David (1999). The Upside Down Church. Carol Stream, IL: Tyndale House. ISBN 9780842378123.
- Laurie, Greg (2003). Wrestling with God: Prayer That Never Gives Up. LifeChange Books. Colorado Springs, CO: Penguin-Multnomah. ISBN 9781590528945.
- —— (2004). Every Day with Jesus: First Steps for New Believers. Carol Stream, IL: Tyndale House. ISBN 1414300751.
- —— (2005). Losers and Winners, Saints and Sinners: How to Finish Strong in the Spiritual Race. New York, NY: Warner Faith. ISBN 0446500151.
- ——; Vaughn, Ellen Santilli (2008). Lost Boy: My Story. Riverside, IL: Allen David-Kerygma. ISBN 9780830745784. Note, David Allen Books-Kerygma Publishing appear to be the publishing arm of Greg Laurie's ministry, and is thus (apart from other evidence, is located to Riverside, CA; explore at this, and this link regarding this conclusion. (No other address appears on their published works, and no authoritative entries appear for this publisher at standard publishing sources.)
- —— (2011). Let God Change Your Life: How to Know and Follow Jesus. Colorado Springs, CO: David C. Cook. ISBN 9781434702074.
- —— (2014). As It Is in Heaven: How Eternity Brings Focus to What Really Matters. Colorado Springs, CO: Tyndale-NavPress. ISBN 9781612915692.
- —— (2017). Steve McQueen: The Salvation of an American Icon. Austin, TX: Greenleaf Book Group-American Icon Press. ISBN 9781946891051.
- ——; Vaughn, Ellen (2018). Jesus Revolution: How God Transformed an Unlikely Generation and how He Can Do It Again Today. Grand Rapids, MI: Baker. ISBN 9780801075940.
- ——; Terrill, Marshall (2019). Johnny Cash: The Redemption of An American Icon. Washington, DC: Regnary-Salem. ISBN 9781621579809.
- ——; Libby, Larry (2020). World Changers: How God Uses Ordinary People to do Extraordinary Things. Grand Rapids, MI: Baker. ISBN 9780801075957.
- —— (2022). Lennon, Dylan, Alice and Jesus. Washington, DC: Regnary-Salem. ISBN 9781684513154. Note, Google Books indicates the Publisher as Simon & Schuster, at odds with the publisher appearing in the front material excerpt provided (which clearly presents Regnary-Salem).
- —— (2023). Heaven's Light Breaking: A 25 Day Advent Devotional. Brentwood, TN: Forefront-K-Love. ISBN 9781954201484.

==== Works edited ====
- Laurie, Greg, ed. (2000). The Seeker's Bible: New Testament: New Living Translation. Carol Stream, IL: Tyndale House. ISBN 0842339280.

=== Films ===
Laurie's 2018 autobiographical book, Jesus Revolution, written with Ellen Vaughn, was adapted as a feature film in 2023. The film, also titled Jesus Revolution, was produced by Kingdom Story Company and Lionsgate, and presents the story of how Laurie and his wife Cathe came to faith during the Jesus Movement in Southern California.

Laurie has produced or written several films, including;

- Lost Boy. (2010)
- Hope for Hurting Hearts.(2013)
- Steve McQueen: American Icon. (2019)
- A Rush of Hope. (2020)
- Johnny Cash: The Redemption of an American Icon. (2022)
- Jesus Revolution (2023).

=== Other media ===
Laurie's sermons are featured on the syndicated half-hour daily radio program, A New Beginning, broadcast on over 1,100 stations worldwide. A New Beginning is also featured as a Christian podcast, available on iTunes.

Laurie has also a guest commentator at WorldNetDaily, and as of this date, appeared regularly in a weekly television program called GregLaurie.tv on the Trinity Broadcasting Network (TBN).

== Awards and recognition ==
Laurie's The Upside Down Church (1999, co-authored with David Kopp, see Published works), won a Gold Medallion Book Award in the "Christian ministry" category in 2000.

As of 2023, Laurie and his National Day of Prayer organisation were reporting that he had been given two honorary doctorates, from Biola University and from Azusa Pacific University.

== Personal life ==
As of 2024, Laurie resided in Newport Beach, California, with his wife, Catherine (Cathe). They have two sons, Christopher and Jonathan, and five grandchildren.

On July 24, 2008, Christopher was killed at the scene of a car accident on eastbound Riverside Freeway in Corona, California; he was 33 years old.
