= Zachary Levi =

American actor (born 1980)

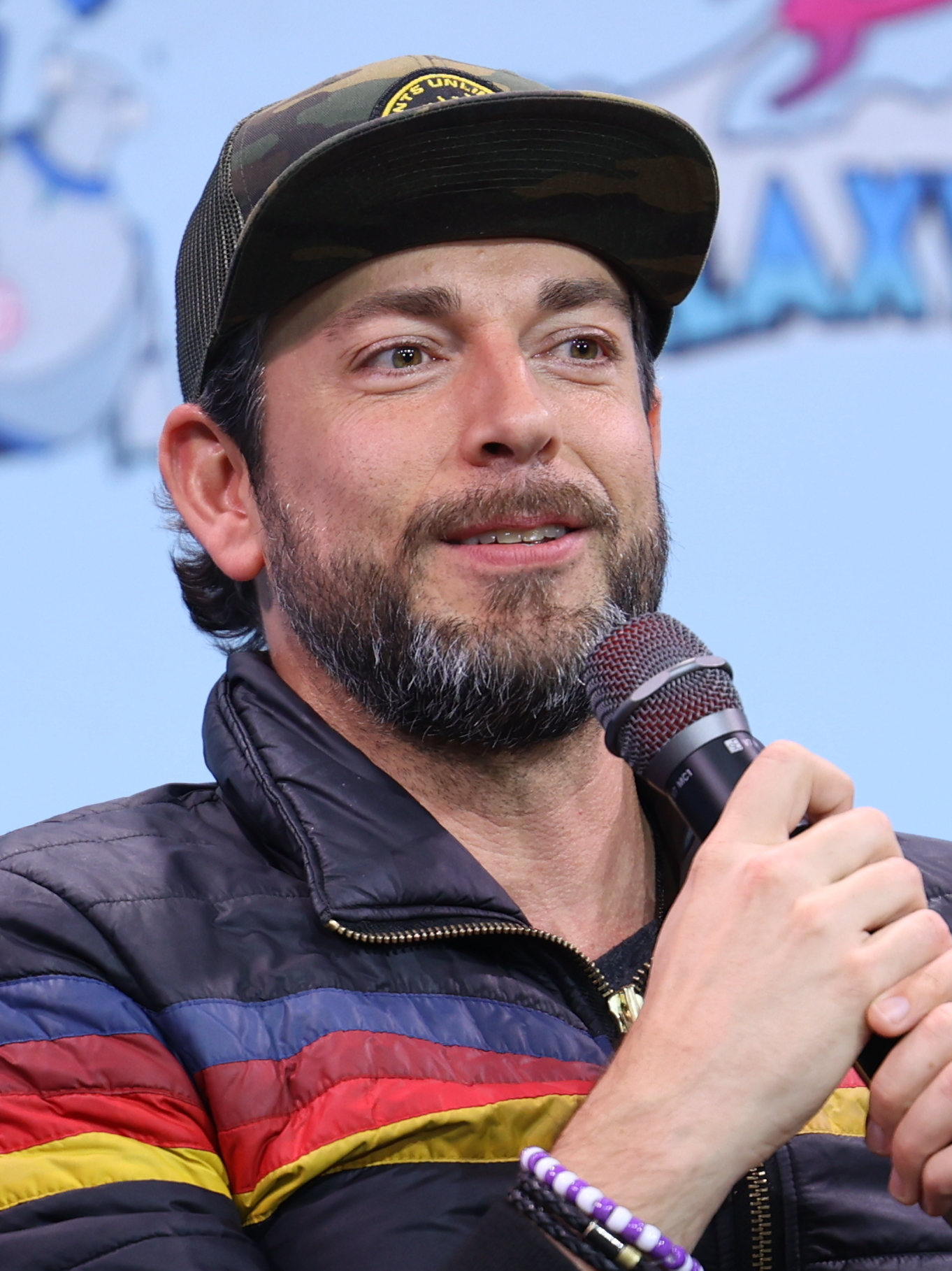
- Levi at the 2024 GalaxyCon Columbus
- Born: Zachary Levi Pugh; September 29, 1980 (age 46); Lake Charles, Louisiana, U.S.
- Occupation: Actor
- Years active: 2001–present
- Spouse: Missy Peregrym (m. 2014; div. 2015)
- Partner: Maggie Keating
- Children: 1

Zachary Levi Pugh (/pjuː/ PEW; born September 29, 1980) is an American actor. He starred as Kipp Steadman in the sitcom Less Than Perfect (2002–2006), Chuck Bartowski in the action comedy series Chuck (2007–2012), and as the title character in the superhero film Shazam! (2019) and its 2023 sequel.

He voiced Flynn Rider in the 2010 Disney animated musical fantasy film Tangled, in which he performed "I See the Light" with Mandy Moore. The song won a Grammy Award for Best Song Written for Visual Media. He reprised the voice role in the 2012 short film Tangled Ever After and in the 2017 television series Rapunzel's Tangled Adventure. He also appeared as Fandral in the superhero films Thor: The Dark World (2013) and Thor: Ragnarok (2017).

Levi starred as Georg Nowack in the 2016 Broadway revival of She Loves Me, for which he received a Tony Award nomination.

== Early life ==
Levi was born in Lake Charles, Louisiana, the son of Susan Marie Pugh (née Hoctor, 1950–2015) and Darrell Alton Pugh (1946–2023). Zachary is of English, Welsh, and German descent. While he was a child, he and his family moved to several states before returning to their home in Ventura, California, where he attended Buena High School for four years. He began acting on stage at the age of six, performing lead roles in regional productions including Grease, The Outsiders, Oklahoma!, Oliver!, The Wizard of Oz, and Big River at the Ojai Art Center in Ojai, California.

== Career ==
=== Acting ===
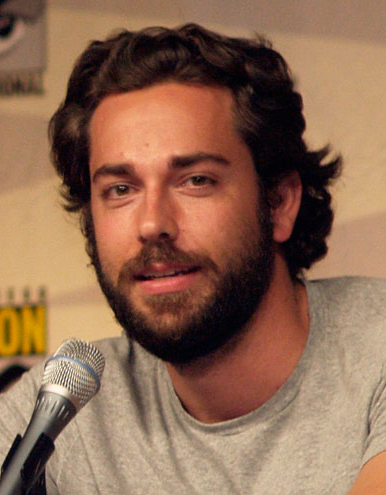
Levi speaking at the 2009 San Diego Comic-Con

Levi first appeared in the Showtime/Goosehead.com series, Whatever, as a teenage boy, Ben. He was credited as Zachary Pugh. The series was produced by Ashley Powers and released in 2000. Levi was next seen in the FX television film Big Shot: Confessions of a Campus Bookie. He played Kipp Steadman on the ABC sitcom Less than Perfect. He also portrayed a potential boyfriend of Charisma Carpenter's character, Jane, in the then-ABC Family television film See Jane Date. Levi was slated to be a lead in an ABC pilot called Three for the 2004/2005 television season, but the show was not picked up.

He landed the starring role in Chuck in 2007. Levi and his Chuck co-star Yvonne Strahovski were both nominated for Best Action Actor and Actress Choice TV Series for the Teen Choice Awards 2010 where they both won and presented. In the summer of 2008, he was named one of Entertainment Weekly's Top Thirty People Under Thirty. He later starred in the film Alvin and the Chipmunks: The Squeakquel in the lead role as Dave's cousin Toby Seville. He starred in the 2010 Disney-animated feature film Tangled, which is based on the popular fairy tale Rapunzel. He voices Flynn Rider, a bandit who finds refuge in Rapunzel's tower. He provided narration in the 2011 film Under the Boardwalk: The Monopoly Story, a documentary about the game of Monopoly. Levi hosted the 2011 Spike Video Game Awards.

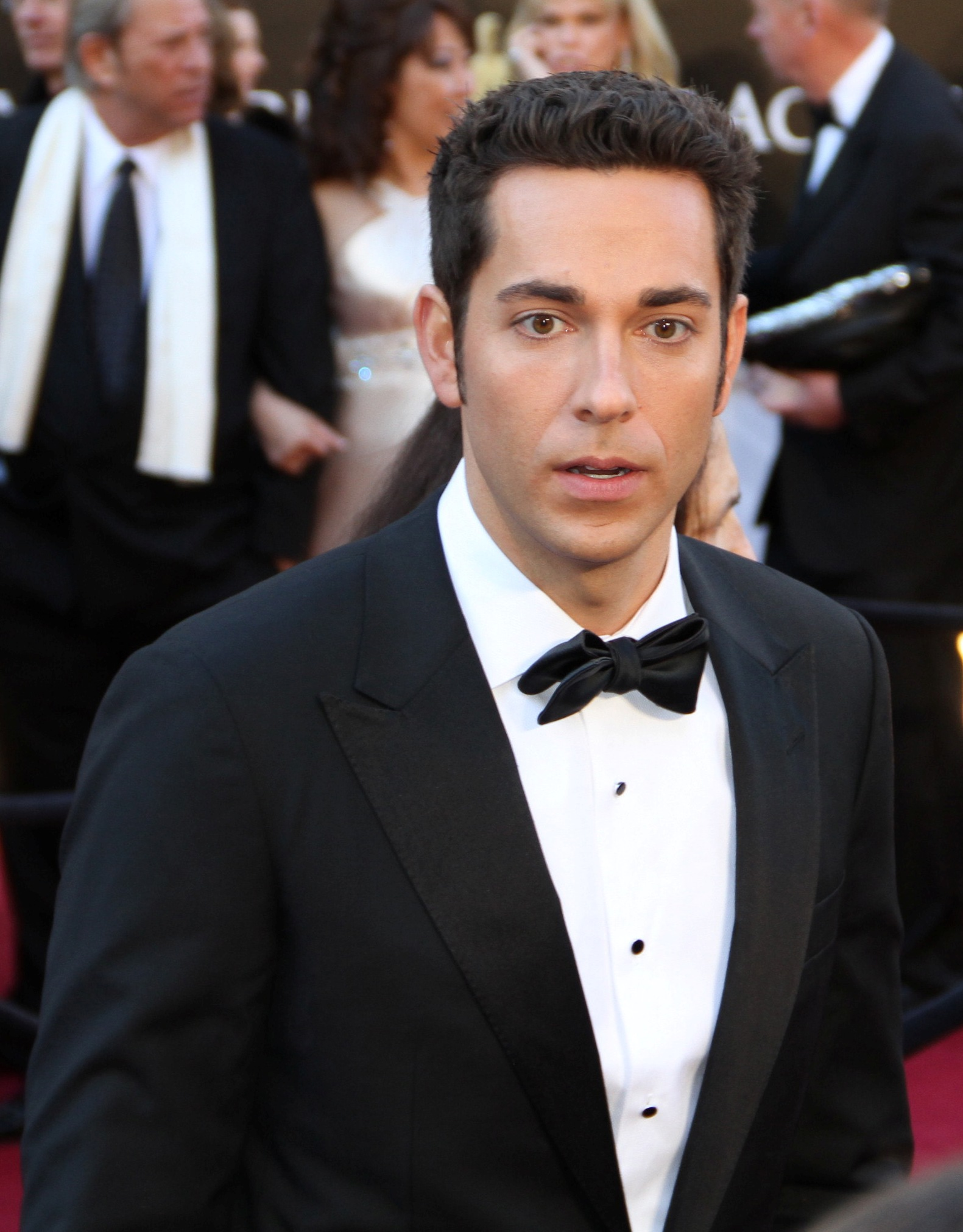
Levi at the 83rd Academy Awards in February 2011

BuddyTV ranked Levi as #97 on its list of "TV's Sexiest Men of 2011". He landed the male lead in the 2012 TV pilot Let It Go, which would have aired on Fox, but was not picked up. He hosted the web documentaries Tomb Raider The Final Hours, going behind the scenes of the new Tomb Raider game. He was originally to portray Fandral in Thor, but had to drop out due to scheduling conflicts with Chuck. He did play the role in the sequels, Thor: The Dark World (2013), after original actor Josh Dallas had scheduling conflicts of his own, and briefly in Thor: Ragnarok (2017). Levi made his Broadway debut in a production of the musical comedy First Date in August 2013.

In January 2015, it was announced that Levi would be a lead member of the cast of NBC's 13-episode miniseries Heroes Reborn as Luke Collins. The show was not picked up for a second season. He also guest-starred as Abraham Lincoln in the Hulu original series Deadbeat.

Levi joined the cast of the Broadway revival of She Loves Me in the lead role of Georg, alongside Laura Benanti as Amalia. It opened at Studio 54 on March 17, 2016, after previews on February 19, 2016, for a limited engagement through June 12. The run was later extended through July 10, when it closed. The production received high critical praise, receiving 5 Stars from The Guardian and was selected as a Critics' Pick for The New York Times. Levi was nominated for a Tony Award for Best Performance by an Actor in a Leading Role in a Musical for his performance. Critics praised Levi's performance of Georg, noting that his portrayal is "suave and handsome at times, disarmingly nebbishy at others," and that he "[exudes] sweet modesty and just a pinch of hauteur." The production had a historic livestreamed performance on June 30, 2016, with Levi and the cast participating in the first livestreamed show in Broadway history.

In 2017, Levi reprised his role as Flynn Rider in a Disney Channel original film titled Tangled: Before Ever After. The television movie continues the story as a regular series titled Rapunzel's Tangled Adventure, which lasted for three seasons, premiering on March 24, 2017, and concluding March 1, 2020. The series is based on the 2010 film Tangled and features the returning voices of Mandy Moore and Levi. In 2018, Levi appeared as Dr. Benjamin Ettenberg, a love interest for the main character, Miriam 'Midge' Maisel, in the second season of The Marvelous Mrs. Maisel. With the series' other principal cast members, Levi won the Screen Actors Guild Award for Outstanding Performance by an Ensemble in a Comedy Series at SAG's January 2019 awards ceremony.

In 2019, Levi starred as the main character in New Line Cinema and Warner Bros.' superhero comedy feature film Shazam!, an entry in the DC Extended Universe franchise. In the film, Levi's Shazam character (also known as Captain Marvel) is the superpowered alter-ego of a teenaged boy, Billy Batson (played by Asher Angel), who retains his childish personality in his adult form similar to the 1988 20th Century Fox comedy Big.

After a nearly two-year hiatus from acting, Levi starred in a supporting role in Kevin Macdonald's 2021 legal drama, The Mauritanian. Levi also played the role of Kurt Warner in the biographical sports drama American Underdog that same year. In 2023, he reprised his role as Billy Batson in Shazam! Fury of the Gods, played the character of Terrence Tango-Torrez in Spy Kids: Armageddon opposite Gina Rodriguez and voiced Rocky in Chicken Run: Dawn of the Nugget, replacing Mel Gibson. In 2024, Levi starred in the film adaptation of Harold and the Purple Crayon, playing a grown-up version of the titular character. In 2025, Levi portrayed the author Scott LeRette, the father of a child with osteogenesis imperfecta, in The Unbreakable Boy. Also in 2025, Levi portrayed the character of Bert Smith, a charming, silver-tongued, and opportunistic wildcatter who initially appears self-centered but undergoes a transformation. He is an intelligent and resourceful hustler who becomes an unlikely ally to Sarah Rector, ultimately being changed by her strong faith and determination to protect her land in the film Sarah's Oil. In late 2025, he played the character of Nick Schuyler in the drama movie Not Without Hope. In early 2026, Zachary Levi hosted a four-part docu-drama on Fox Nation. The series chronicles the biblical story of David, focusing on his rise from shepherd to king, the battle with Goliath, and his journey as a flawed, human leader, aiming to highlight themes of faith, redemption, and divine love.

=== Music ===
In April 2010, Katharine McPhee released a preview of a music video to cinemas for her single "Terrified". Levi and McPhee have a duet on the song (which was re-recorded; the original album version features Jason Reeves) and appears in the music video singing with McPhee. On May 3, 2010, the song was previewed on the Entertainment Weekly website and made available for purchase on iTunes. The full video premiered May 7, 2010, on the music video website Vevo. Levi financed Kendall Payne's album Grown after she was dropped by her label, Capitol Records.

On the soundtrack of the film Tangled, Levi sings "I See the Light" (with costar Mandy Moore) and "I've Got a Dream". For the film receiving a Oscar for Best Original Song nomination, Levi and Moore performed "I See the Light" at the 83rd Academy Awards. Levi has also been a guest member of Band from TV, a band made up of actors from various American television shows. On December 21, 2023, Levi performed Jolly Holiday from the 1964 film Mary Poppins on the primetime CBS special Dick Van Dyke: 98 Years of Magic.

=== Producing ===
Levi launched a production company called Wyldwood Productions in 2020. Director Zach Ramelan directed two narrative short films for the studio in 2020: Freelancer in February and The Statement starring Levi in May. In 2023, the studio co-produced the sixty-second episode of The FilmUp Podcast which is about Levi's life, career, and future plans. Wyldwood released its first theatrical feature film, Sarah's Oil, in partnership with Metro-Goldwyn-Mayer in 2025.

== Personal life ==
Levi at San Diego Comic-Con referencing his time on Broadway, July 2014

Levi is a sports car and motorcycle enthusiast, and owns a 2009 Nissan GT-R. He is an avid gamer, having first played Super Mario Bros., and appreciates video games for their ability to provide interactive stories. He lives near Austin, Texas. In September 2010, Levi started his own company, The Nerd Machine. He participated in the Celebrity All Star Game at NBA All Star Weekend 2011, playing for the team coached by Magic Johnson.

On June 16, 2014, Canadian actress Missy Peregrym announced that she and Levi had married in Maui, Hawaii. They filed for divorce in April 2015, with the separation date listed in court documents as December 3, 2014. In December 2024, Levi announced that his girlfriend Maggie Keating was expecting their child. Their son was born in April 2025.

Levi has been open about his struggles with mental health and suicidal thoughts, both on social media and in his 2022 memoir Radical Love.

In April 2026, Levi was present at the 2026 White House Correspondents' Dinner shooting.

=== Religion ===
Levi grew up as a Christian. In a 2003 interview with Relevant Magazine, he said that he gets his "peace, comfort, love and talents" from his faith.

Throughout his career, Levi has been mistaken as Jewish. Early in his career, a Hollywood agent persuaded him to change his name saying, "A guy named Zach Pugh would not be going far in Hollywood," which led him to drop his last name. In a 2013 interview with New York Post, Levi said he has no Jewish ancestry. In 2016, he revealed that he had been turned down for a number of roles because casting directors mistakenly thought he was "too Jewish" for the part.

In 2018, he said, "I'm very spiritual, but not particularly religious." While avowing belief in God, he said, "[Religion] is, in my opinion, very destructive to what I believe the true heart and spirit and essence of who God is." In a 2021 interview with The Christian Post, he said working on the film American Underdog bolstered his Christian faith, and in getting to work on this project, "it feels like God's fingerprints were all over it."

=== Politics ===
Levi identifies as a libertarian. During the 2016 presidential election, he encouraged his fans to vote for neither Donald Trump nor Hillary Clinton. In the 2024 election, Levi endorsed Robert F. Kennedy Jr. After Kennedy withdrew his candidacy, Levi endorsed Trump at a "Reclaim America Tour" stop in Dearborn, Michigan. In a 2024 episode of The Rubin Report, Levi expressed fear he might face rejection from Hollywood as a result of his endorsement but concluded, "What is it to gain the whole world and lose your soul in the process?" In May 2025, Levi followed up on his fear and stated there have been actors that have directly told him or his management team that they will no longer work with him due to his public support for Trump.

In a 2022 episode of the podcast The Joe Rogan Experience, Levi described Canadian psychologist Jordan Peterson as "one of the deepest thinkers I've ever heard break down human behavior" who "has a lot of integrity." In January 2023, he agreed with an online post that said, "Do you agree or not, that Pfizer is a real danger to the world?", leading to allegations of echoing anti-vaccine sentiment. He also implied that his former She Loves Me co-star Gavin Creel's death from cancer was caused by the COVID-19 vaccine, which led to heavy criticism of Levi by their former cast-mate Laura Benanti, as well as many other Broadway stars.

In May 2026, Levi endorsed Republican representative Thomas Massie for re-election. In October that same year, Levi endorsed Republican Ken Paxton for U.S. senate in Texas.

=== Philanthropy ===
In 2008, Levi attended the 7th Annual Comedy for a Cure benefit and donated personal belongings to an auction for Tuberous Sclerosis Alliance. In 2010, he spoke at an Anti-Defamation League awards ceremony to denounce LGBT bullying. He joined Stand Up to Cancer charity drives in 2008, 2010 and 2019. Beginning in 2008, he has continued to raise money for Operation Smile to help children with cleft lip and cleft palate receive surgery they need.

In 2020, the Chuck cast performed a table read of the episode "Chuck Versus the Beard" to support Feeding America's COVID-19 Response Fund, raising $31,000 for food banks. In 2022, Levi helped raise funds to support displaced Ukrainian families through Convoy of Hope. In 2023, he allowed AdoptUSKids.org to use his likeness on billboards and in TV spots to promote awareness for foster care and adoption in the United States.

== Filmography ==
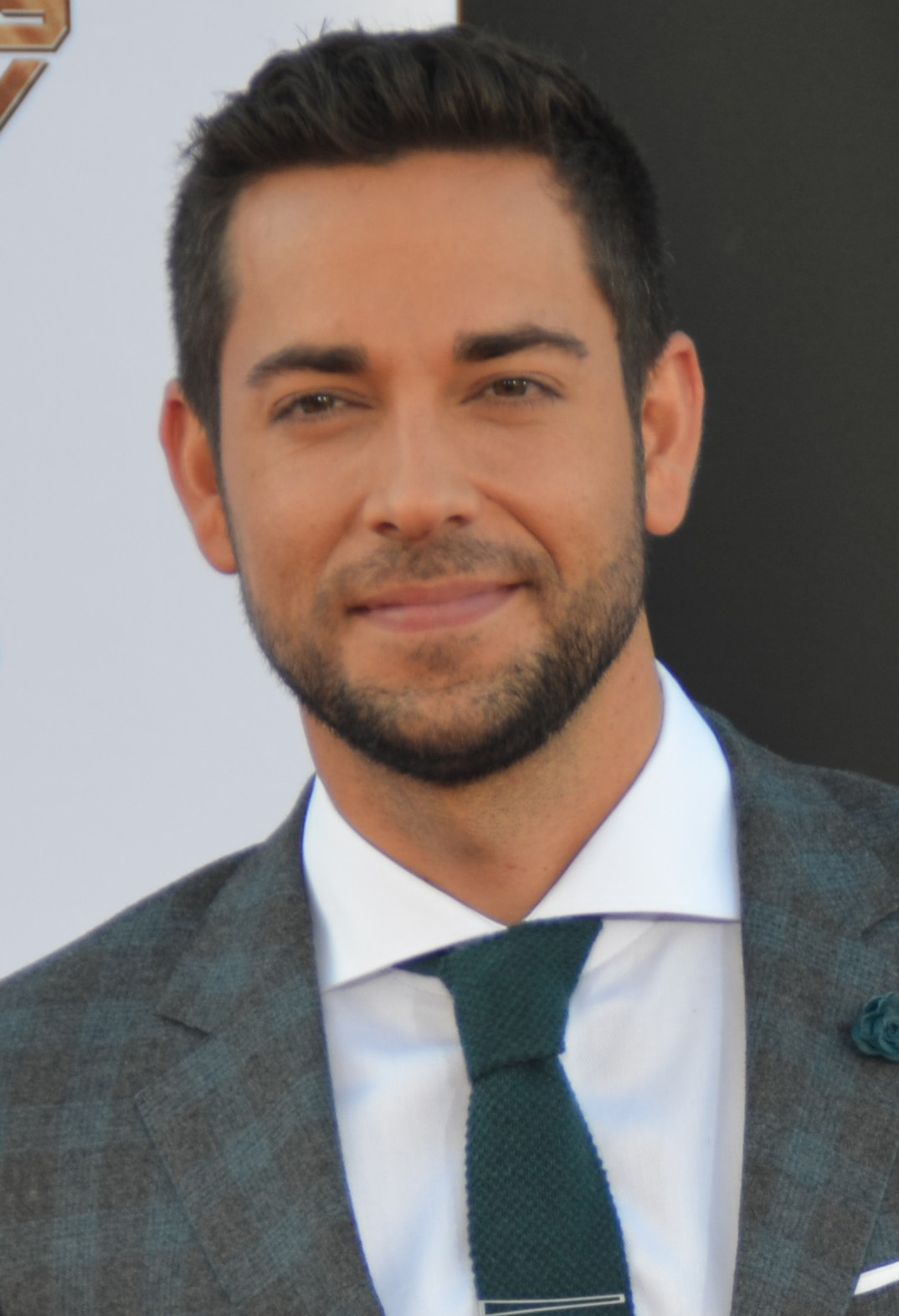
Levi at the premiere of Guardians of the Galaxy in July 2014

=== Film ===
Zachary Levi's film roles
Year	Title	Role	Notes
2006	Big Momma's House 2	Kevin	
2007	Spiral	Berkeley	Also executive producer
2008	Wieners	Ben	
2008	An American Carol	Lab Tech 1	
2008	Shades of Ray	Ray Rehman	
2009	Stuntmen	Troy Ratowski	
2009	Alvin and the Chipmunks: The Squeakquel	Toby Seville	
2010	Tangled	Eugene "Flynn Rider" Fitzherbert	Voice role
2011	Under the Boardwalk: The Monopoly Story	Narrator	
2012	Tangled Ever After	Eugene "Flynn Rider" Fitzherbert	Voice role
2013	Thor: The Dark World	Fandral	
2016	Apex: The Story of the Hypercar	Narrator	
2016	She Loves Me	Georg Nowack	Filmed production of musical play
2017	Thor: Ragnarok	Fandral	
2017	The Star	Joseph (voice)	
2018	Office Uprising	Adam Nusbaum	
2018	Blood Fest	Himself	Cameo
2019	Shazam!	William "Billy" Batson / Shazam	
2021	The Mauritanian	Neil Buckland	
2021	American Underdog	Kurt Warner	
2022	Apollo 10 1/2: A Space Age Childhood	Kranz	
2022	Teddy's Christmas	Teddy	English voice role
2022	Night at the Museum: Kahmunrah Rises Again	Larry Daley / Laa	Voice role, replacing Ben Stiller
2023	Shazam! Fury of the Gods	William "Billy" Batson / Shazam	
2023	Spy Kids: Armageddon	Terrence Tango-Torrez	
2023	Chicken Run: Dawn of the Nugget	Rocky	Voice role, replacing Mel Gibson
2024	Harold and the Purple Crayon	Harold	
2025	The Unbreakable Boy	Scott LeRette	
2025	Not Without Hope	Nick Schuyler	
2025	Sarah's Oil	Bert Smith	Also producer
2026	The Fix	Tucker	Also executive producer
2026	Angel and the Badman	Quirt Evans	Also executive producer

=== Television ===
Zachary Levi's television roles
Year	Title	Role	Notes
2001	Untitled Sisqo Project	Michael Golden	Unsold TV pilot
2002	Big Shot: Confessions of a Campus Bookie	Adam	Television film
2002–2006	Less than Perfect	Kipp Steadman	Main role, 81 episodes
2003	See Jane Date	Grant Asher	Television film
2004	The Division	Todd	2 episodes
2004	Curb Your Enthusiasm	Bellman	Episode: "Opening Night"
2005	Brody & Friends	Zac	Episode: "The Hollywood Lifestyle"
2006	Worst Week of My Life	Nick	Unsold pilot
2007	Imperfect Union	Clark	Television film
2007–2012	Chuck	Chuck Bartowski	Lead role, 91 episodes; also director of 3 episodes
2011	Team Unicorn	Young Lover	Episode: "Alien Beach Crashers"
2011	2011 Spike Video Game Awards	Host	Also consulting producer
2011	Vietnam in HD	Karl Marlantes	Voice role, 6 episodes
2012	4 Points	Himself	Episode: "Zachary Levi"
2012–2022	Robot Chicken	Various characters / Shazam	Voice role, 4 episodes
2013	Remember Sunday	Gus	Television film
2014–2015	Hollywood Game Night	Himself	2 episodes
2015	Deadbeat	Abraham Lincoln	Episode: "The Emancipation Apparition"
2015	Heroes Reborn	Luke Collins	Main role, 13 episodes
2015	Geeks Who Drink	Himself	Host, also executive producer
2015–2016	Telenovela	James McMahon	Recurring role, 5 episodes
2016	The $100,000 Pyramid	Himself	Episode: "Zachary Levi vs. Teri Polo"
2017	Tangled: Before Ever After	Eugene "Flynn Rider" Fitzherbert	Television film, voice role
2017	Alias Grace	Jeremiah Pontelli	Miniseries
2017	Psych: The Movie	Billy McGoldrick	Television film
2017–2020	Rapunzel's Tangled Adventure	Eugene "Flynn Rider" Fitzherbert / Prince Horace	Main voice role, 56 episodes
2018–2019	The Marvelous Mrs. Maisel	Dr. Benjamin Ettenberg	Recurring role, 8 episodes
2022	Who Do You Think You Are?	Himself	Guest
2022	Family Guy	Seymour	Voice role, episode: "Hard Boiled Meg"
2023	The Masked Singer	Himself	Guest, episode: "DC Superheroes Night"
2026	David: King of Israel	Himself	Host/Narrator, 4 episodes
TBA	Gabriel and the Guardians	Mikha’el	Also serves as Executive producer

=== Video games ===
Zachary Levi's video game roles
Year	Title	Role	Notes
2010	Halo: Reach	Trooper 4	Voice role
2010	Fallout: New Vegas	Arcade Gannon	Voice role
2010	Tangled: The Video Game	Eugene "Flynn Rider" Fitzherbert	Voice role
2013	Tomb Raider	Himself	Voice role
2018	Lego DC Super-Villains	Billy Batson / Shazam	Voice role, Shazam! DLC Level Pack
2019	Kingdom Hearts III	Eugene "Flynn Rider" Fitzherbert	Voice role
2020	Grounded	Dr. Wendell Tully	Voice role
2022	Disney Dreamlight Valley	Eugene "Flynn Rider" Fitzherbert	Voice role

=== Internet ===
Zachary Levi's internet roles
Year	Title	Role	Notes
2000	Whatever	Ben	5 episodes; credited as Zachary Pugh
2011	The Guild	Himself	1 episode (5.8)
2011–2016	NerdHQ	Host	San Diego Comic Con Special
2012	Video Game High School	Ace	3 episodes
2013	Tiny Commando	Tiny Commando	7 episodes
2019	Good Mythical Morning	Himself	1 episode

== Theater ==
Year	Title	Role	Notes
2013–2014	First Date	Aaron	Longacre Theatre, Broadway
2016	She Loves Me	Georg Nowack	Studio 54, Broadway
2016	Sunday in the Park with George	Jules / Bob Greenberg	New York City Center, Off-Broadway
2023	Gutenberg! The Musical!	The Producer	James Earl Jones Theatre, Broadway; One night cameo

== Discography ==
- "Terrified" (2010) – Performed by Katharine McPhee featuring Zachary Levi
- "I See the Light" (2010) – Performed by Levi and Mandy Moore for the film Tangled
- First Date (Original Broadway Cast Recording)
- She Loves Me (2016 Broadway Cast Recording)

=== Live performances ===
On February 27, 2011, Levi performed "I See the Light" with Mandy Moore at the 83rd Academy Awards. On June 12, 2016, he performed the title song from She Loves Me, as part of a medley presented on the 70th Tony Awards. He has also appeared live performing in various programs since he was a child.

== Awards and nominations ==
=== Accolades ===
List of awards and nominations received by Zachary LeviZachary Levi's awards from film roles
Year	Nominated work	Award	Result	Ref.
2010	Tangled	Broadcast Film Critics Association Award for Best Song	Nominated	
2010	Tangled	World Soundtrack Academy Award for Best Original Song Written Directly for a Film	Nominated	
2010	Tangled	Teen Choice Award for Choice Movie Voice	Nominated	
2016	She Loves Me	Tony Award for Leading Actor In A Musical	Nominated	
2019	Shazam!	MTV Movie & TV Award for Best Comedic Performance	Nominated	
2019	Shazam!	MTV Movie & TV Award for Best Hero	Nominated	
2019	Shazam!	Teen Choice Award for Choice Sci-Fi/Fantasy Movie Actor	Nominated	
2019	The Marvelous Mrs. Maisel	Screen Actors Guild Awards for Outstanding Performance by an Ensemble in a Comedy Series	Won	
2024	Harold and the Purple Crayon	Family Film Award for Outstanding Actor in a Feature Film	Nominated	
2025	Harold and the Purple Crayon	Golden Raspberry Award for Worst Actor	Nominated	
