= Harvest Crusades =

Evangelical Christian organisation

- Founded: 1990
- Founder: Greg Laurie
- Type: 501(c)(3)
- Headquarters: Los Angeles, United States
- Website: harvest.org

Harvest Crusades is an Evangelical Christian organization based in Los Angeles, United States, that organizes evangelistic conferences.

== History ==
The conference has its origins in a public evangelistic event in Los Angeles founded in 1990, by the senior pastor of Harvest Christian Fellowship, Greg Laurie. The event has been renamed Harvest Crusades.

In 2005, 100,000 people attended at the conference.

Harvest Crusades shifted to an online-only format in 2020 in response to the COVID-19 outbreak.

In 2022, 21,000 people attended at the conference in Boise, Idaho and 144,000 people online.
