= The Jesus Music =

- Theatrical release poster
- Directed by: Erwin Brothers
- Screenplay by: Jon Erwin
- Produced by: Brandon Gregory; Josh Walsh
- Cinematography: Kristopher Kimlin
- Edited by: Parker Adams; John Puckett
- Production companies: Kingdom Story Company; K-Love Films; Southland Studios
- Distributed by: Lionsgate
- Release date: October 1, 2021
- Running time: 108 minutes
- Country: United States
- Language: English
- Box office: $1 million

The Jesus Music is a 2021 American documentary film distributed by Lionsgate and directed by the Erwin brothers, detailing the history of contemporary Christian music as a musical and cultural phenomenon.

The film was released by Lionsgate on October 1, 2021. The Jesus Music was nominated for the GMA Dove Award for Inspirational Film/Series of the Year at the 2022 GMA Dove Awards.

== Synopsis ==
The film documents the history of contemporary Christian music, from its roots in the Jesus music of the 1970s, through the Christian rock and Christian metal eras of the 1980s and 1990s, into the rise of praise and worship music in the early 21st century. A number of prominent figures in Christian music are interviewed, including Amy Grant, Michael W. Smith, Steven Curtis Chapman, CeCe Winans, Toby McKeehan, Michael Tait, Kirk Franklin, Russ Taff, Lecrae, and Lauren Daigle.

== Promotion ==
An accompanying book, written by Marshall Terrill, was published alongside the release of the film. The film was screened for an audience of music industry personnel, including many of the artists interviewed in the film, in Nashville the week prior to its theatrical release.

== Reception ==
On the review aggregator website Rotten Tomatoes, 67% of 15 critics' reviews are positive. Audiences polled by CinemaScore gave the film an average grade of "A" on an A+ to F scale.
