= Kingdom Story Company =

American film and television studio

- Logo since 2019
- Formerly: Kingdom Studios (2019)
- Type: Film production
- Industry: Faith-based entertainment
- Founded: March 26, 2019; 7 years ago
- Founder: Erwin Brothers; Kevin Downes; Tony Young
- Headquarters: Nashville, Tennessee; Los Angeles, California
- Key people: Jon Erwin (CEO); Andrew Erwin (CCO); Kevin Downes (chief of production and distribution); Tony Young (chairman)
- Products: Motion pictures Television programming
- Owner: Lionsgate Studios; Erwin brothers Kevin Downes; Tony Young
- Website: www.kingdomstorycompany.com

Kingdom Story Company (formerly known as Kingdom Studios) is an American independent film and television studio in partnership with Lionsgate specializing in the production of Christian films. It was founded on March 26, 2019 by the Erwin Brothers (Jon and Andrew Erwin), Kevin Downes, and Tony Young and is based in Franklin, Tennessee.

== History ==
Kingdom was funded by profits from the Erwins' film I Can Only Imagine, which was released in early 2018 by Lionsgate, grossing more than $83 million at the domestic box office on a $7 million budget. Subsequent negotiations with Lionsgate culminated in a multi-year deal in which it was agreed that the Erwin Brothers and Kevin Downes would create faith-based feature films and television programming for the company. Lionsgate Motion Picture Group Chairman, Joe Drake, and Television Group Chairman, Kevin Beggs announced the agreement on August 9, 2018.

Kingdom Story Company was announced to have been launched on March 26, 2019, at the National Religious Broadcasters convention in Anaheim, California.

I Still Believe, Kingdom's first film project, began filming in the spring of 2019 and was released on March 13, 2020.

In September 2019, it was announced that Kingdom would be launching a television division, headed by The Big Bang Theory producer Mona Garcea.

After Kingdom acquired the film rights to NFL quarterback Kurt Warner's life story, interviews, and memoir, American Underdog: The Kurt Warner Story was announced in February 2020, and released on December 25, 2021.

In November of 2024, after Jon Erwin departed Kingdom Story Company to launch Wonder Project, it was announced that Kingdom Story Company and Lionsgate had renewed their first look deal for the third time, with the additional announcement that President and COO Brandon Gregory had been promoted to partner.

In September of 2025, Kevin Downes stepped down from Kingdom to pursue his own productions and producer Joshua Walsh was brought on as Chief Production Officer.

== Filmography ==
Kingdom Story Company intends to produce two faith-based films per year. I Still Believe, based on Jeremy Camp's life during his first wife's cancer battle, was Kingdom's first film to be theatrically released. This was followed by American Underdog and The Jesus Music in 2021, Johnny Cash: The Redemption Of An American Icon in 2022, and Jesus Revolution, which is based on the events surrounding the Jesus Movement. Ordinary Angels, starring Hillary Swank and Alan Ritchson released in February of 2024, with Unsung Hero releasing in April of that year produced in cooperation with Christian music group For King and Country. Dallas Jenkins (creator of The Chosen) then brought Barbara Robinson's story The Best Christmas Pageant Ever to life with Kingdom Story Company which released on November 7th, 2024.

In April of 2025, Kingdom Story Company began production on I Can Only Imagine 2, the sequel to their hit I Can Only Imagine. The movie was directed by Andrew Erwin and Brent McCorkle, earning a 4th A+ Cinema score for Erwin (one of 3 directors to have achieved this in their career). The sequel followed Bart Millard of MercyMe and newcomer Tim Timmons (portrayed by Milo Ventimiglia) to tell the story of the song "Even If".

=== Films ===
Film	Director(s)	Prospective year of release	References
I Still Believe	Erwin brothers	2020	
The Jesus Music	Erwin brothers	2021	
American Underdog	Erwin brothers	2021	
Jesus Revolution	Jon Erwin & Brent McCorkle	2023	
Ordinary Angels	Jon Gunn	2024	
Unsung Hero	Joel Smallbone and Richard Ramsey	2024	
White Bird	Marc Forster	2024	
The Best Christmas Pageant Ever	Dallas Jenkins	2024	
The Unbreakable Boy	Jon Gunn	2025	
Sarah's Oil	Cyrus Nowrasteh	2025	
I Can Only Imagine 2	Andrew Erwin and Brent McCorkle	2026	

== See also ==
- Great American Pure Flix
- Affirm Films
- Fox Faith
- Lightworkers Media
