= The Unbreakable Boy =

2025 film by Jon Gunn

- Theatrical release poster
- Directed by: Jon Gunn
- Written by: Jon Gunn
- Based on: The Unbreakable Boy: A Father's Fear, a Son's Courage, and a Story of Unconditional Love by Scott Michael LeRette and Susy Flory
- Produced by: Kevin Downes; Andrew Erwin; Jon Erwin; Jerilyn Esquibel; Peter Facinelli
- Starring: Zachary Levi; Meghann Fahy; Jacob Laval; Drew Powell; Patricia Heaton
- Cinematography: Kristopher Kimlin
- Edited by: Parker Adams
- Music by: Pancho Burgos-Goizueta
- Production companies: Kingdom Story Company; Unbreakable Boy LLC
- Distributed by: Lionsgate
- Release date: February 21, 2025
- Running time: 109 minutes
- Country: United States
- Language: English
- Box office: $7.5 million

The Unbreakable Boy is a 2025 American biographical drama film directed and written by Jon Gunn. It is based on the book The Unbreakable Boy: A Father's Fear, a Son's Courage, and a Story of Unconditional Love, authored by Scott Michael LeRette and Susy Flory, which is based on a true story. It stars Zachary Levi in the lead role alongside Meghann Fahy, Jacob Laval, Drew Powell, Gavin Warren, and Patricia Heaton.

Lionsgate announced a feature-length film based on the book in November 2020, with Gunn attached as writer and director. Filming began that same month in Oklahoma and wrapped in December.

Originally scheduled to be released in 2022, The Unbreakable Boy was delayed several times before being released in the United States by Lionsgate on February 21, 2025. The film received mixed reviews from critics.

== Cast ==
- Zachary Levi as Scott LeRette, Austin's father.
- Meghann Fahy as Teresa LeRette, Austin's mother.
- Jacob Laval as Austin LeRette, a boy on the autism spectrum with brittle bone disease.
  - Roy Jackson Miller as young Austin
- Drew Powell as Joe, Scott's imaginary friend.
- Amy Acker as Lori, Teresa's sister and Austin and Logan's aunt.
- Patricia Heaton as Marcia
- Gavin Warren as Logan LeRette, Austin's younger brother.
- Pilot Bunch as Tyler
- Peter Facinelli as Preacher Rick
- Todd Terry as Dick
- Kevin Downes as Lyle

== Production ==
The Unbreakable Boy was announced on November 13, 2020, by the Erwin brothers. Four days later, it was announced that Zachary Levi would star in the film. Three days later, it was announced that Jacob Laval, Meghann Fahy, Peter Facinelli, Drew Powell, Pilot Bunch, and Patricia Heaton had joined the cast.

Filming began in Oklahoma during the COVID-19 pandemic in November 2020 and wrapped in late 2020. On November 29, 2021, it was announced that Pancho Burgos-Goizueta would score the film.

== Release ==
The Unbreakable Boy was initially scheduled to be released in the United States on March 18, 2022, but was pulled from Lionsgate's release schedule eight days before its release with no explanation or new release date. On January 24, 2024, after being undated for over two years, the film was given the release date of February 21, 2025.

On the day of its release, Downes revealed that the reason for the film's sudden withdrawal from release in 2022 was that the filmmakers wanted to save it "just for the right time", citing the political division within the United States at the time as a primary factor.

== Reception ==
=== Box office ===
In the United States and Canada, The Unbreakable Boy was released alongside The Monkey and was projected to gross $2–3 million from 1,687 theaters in its opening weekend. The film made $850,000 on its first day. It debuted to $2.4 million, finishing eighth at the box office. In its second weekend, the film made $1.3 million. It dropped out of the box office top ten in its third weekend.

=== Critical response ===
On the review aggregator website Rotten Tomatoes, 48% of 42 critics' reviews are positive, with an average rating of 5.3/10. The website's consensus reads: "The Unbreakable Boy is amiable enough, but it sells its inspirational true story short by taking too many easy routes towards uplift." Metacritic, which uses a weighted average, assigned the film a score of 35 out of 100, based on six critics, indicating "generally unfavorable" reviews. Audiences polled by CinemaScore gave the film an average grade of "A" on an A+ to F scale, while those surveyed by PostTrak gave it a 90% overall positive score, with 81% saying they would "definitely recommend" it.
