= Harvest Christian Fellowship =

- Location: Riverside, California
- Country: United States
- Denomination: Non-denominational: Calvary Chapel Association; Southern Baptist Convention
- Website: harvest.church

History
- Founded: 1973
- Founder: Greg Laurie

Architecture
- Style: Contemporary/Modern

Administration
- Division: Calvary Chapel

Harvest Christian Fellowship is a Non-denominational Evangelical multi-site church based in Riverside, California, affiliated with the Calvary Chapel Association, and with the Southern Baptist Convention.

== History ==
Harvest Christian Fellowship was founded in 1973 by Greg Laurie, who has been the senior pastor since that time.

In 2009, it opened a new building, with a 5,000-seat auditorium, a gymnasium, and a High School.

In 2017, while remaining a member of the Calvary Chapel Association, the church partnered with the Southern Baptist Convention, after a request from Laurie, because of the important programs of national and international evangelization of the latter.

According to a church census released in 2022, it claimed a weekly attendance of 14,560 people and 4 campuses in different cities.

== Harvest Crusades ==
In 1990, Greg Laurie started holding his first public evangelistic event which would soon be called the Harvest Crusades.

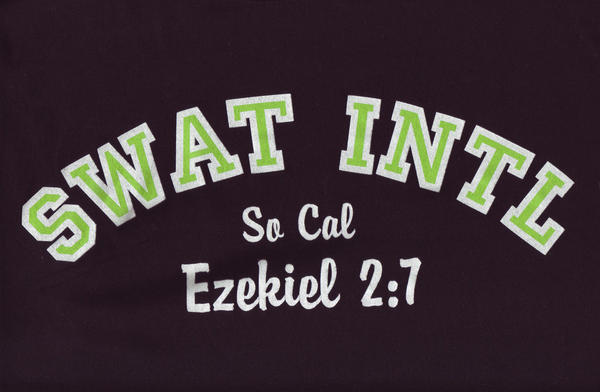
SWAT International T-shirt/Logo

== SWAT Team ==
SWAT stands for Students With A Testimony and is a group of high school and college aged youths to evangelize or conduct what they call "street-witnessing." The SWAT Team roams local streets inviting people to the event and sharing their faith.

== Complaints Against Harvest Riverside ==
Lawsuits were filed in September 2025 against former Harvest Riverside pastor Paul Havsgaard accusing him of severe abuse of children at a shelter in Romania where Havsgaard and other members of Harvest Riverside Church participated in missionary activities. The lawsuits also name the church’s founder and senior pastor, Greg Laurie, a well-known evangelist and author, as well as other senior church leaders, claiming they failed to prevent abuse.
