= Ordinary Angels (film) =

2024 film by Jon Gunn

- Theatrical release poster
- Directed by: Jon Gunn
- Screenplay by: Meg Tilly; Kelly Fremon Craig
- Produced by: Jon Berg; Roy Lee; Dave Matthews; Johnathan Dorfman; Sarah Johnson; David Beal; Kevin Downes; Jon Erwin; Andrew Erwin
- Starring: Hilary Swank; Alan Ritchson; Nancy Travis; Tamala Jones
- Cinematography: Maya Bankovic
- Edited by: Parker Adams
- Music by: Pancho Burgos-Goizueta
- Production companies: Vertigo Entertainment; Kingdom Story Company; Stampede Ventures
- Distributed by: Lionsgate Films
- Release date: February 23, 2024
- Running time: 118 minutes
- Country: United States
- Language: English
- Budget: $12–13 million
- Box office: $20.5 million

Ordinary Angels is a 2024 American drama film. Directed by Jon Gunn and written by Meg Tilly and Kelly Fremon Craig, it is based on true events that transpired during the 1994 North American cold wave. It stars Hilary Swank, Alan Ritchson, Nancy Travis, and Tamala Jones.

The film was theatrically released by Lionsgate on February 23, 2024. It received positive reviews from critics and has grossed $20 million.

== Plot ==
In 1994 Louisville, Kentucky, successful hairdresser and co-owner of a salon Sharon Stevens finds new purpose in life after reading about 5-year-old Michelle Schmitt. The girl who has just lost her mom urgently needs a liver transplant due to biliary atresia. Moved by Michelle's plight, Sharon attends the funeral, introduces herself to the grieving family and offers her help.

The previous night, Sharon had been out drinking and partying. Concerned about her behavior, her friend and salon co-owner Rose insists that she attend an Alcoholics Anonymous meeting. Although Sharon refuses to acknowledge her drinking problem at the meeting, she is profoundly affected when she later sees the news about the Schmitts. At the salon, she shares with Rose her newfound sense of purpose: to help the Schmitts and find meaning in her own life. Sharon organizes a 24-hour hair-a-thon to rally the community and raise funds to help Michelle's widower father Ed, pay off their mounting medical debts.

Meanwhile, Ed struggles with his financial burdens. When he returns home with only part of the groceries his mother Barbara requested, he confides in her about his overwhelming debt. Sharon soon arrives with the over $3,000 she raised for them, though it only covers half the cost of Michelle's last transfusion. Barbara invites her to dinner, where she gets to know the family better.

Upon discovering that the hospital bills total a staggering $400,000, the undeterred Sharon insists that Ed show her his finances. Despite his discomfort with accepting help, she is determined to support the family. Sharon accompanies Ed to a meeting where they secure 50 reroofing jobs from a company rebuilding after a tornado.

While Ed works tirelessly, Sharon canvasses the community, seeking donations from local businesses. One day, he returns home to find Barbara with a twisted ankle and Sharon bonding with the girls, applying makeup and spending time with them. Inspired by her connection with the Schmitt girls, Sharon seeks out her estranged, now-adult son, Derek. Although he remains hostile to her attempts at reconciliation, she continues to try to rebuild their relationship.

When Michelle's health takes a turn for the worse, Sharon steps in to help with the girls. She later persuades Ed to take them all roller-skating, secretly marking the occasion as a tribute to Derek's birthday, although she never explicitly mentions it. Sharon then meets with the hospital in a bid to eliminate Ed's debt.

As Michelle's condition deteriorates, the doctor informs them that she only has four to six weeks left and urgently needs a liver transplant. Now at the top of the donor list, Michelle requires immediate access to a plane to fly her to Omaha. Once again, Sharon uses her persuasive skills to secure the necessary transportation.

Sharon arranges for a TV news crew to visit Ed's home to raise additional funds, but Ed, valuing his privacy, angrily dismisses them. That evening, when Barbara leaves her in charge of the girls, Ed returns to find his daughter in a panic, fearing Sharon is dead. Realizing she is intoxicated, he asks her to leave and not return.

As Christmas passes, Sharon finally resolves to quit drinking, begins attending AA meetings earnestly, and leaves Derek a heartfelt goodbye message. Meanwhile, the story about Michelle finally airs on local news. In mid-January, as Louisville is hit by a major snowstorm, a liver becomes available for her, but she must reach Omaha within six hours.

Despite the airport being closed, Sharon persuades them to clear a runway and finds a pilot willing to brave the storm. Ed, meanwhile, plans a route to the airport, navigating around closed roads. When they encounter a fallen tree blocking their path, Ed uses a roadside emergency phone to relinquish the liver. However, a pickup truck arrives just in time to inform them of an alternate plan.

The news broadcast issues a call for a helicopter pilot, and a Vietnam War veteran volunteers. The town comes together to clear a space for the helicopter to land. In a moment of reconciliation, Derek arrives to help and makes amends with Sharon.

The operation, funded by donations, is a success. Michelle Schmitt grows up, goes on to graduate from college and marries a year later.

== Cast ==
- Hilary Swank as Sharon
- Alan Ritchson as Ed
- Emily Mitchell as Michelle
- Skywalker Hughes as Ashley
- Nancy Travis as Barbara
- Tamala Jones as Rose
- Drew Powell as Pastor Dave
- Nancy Sorel as Virginia
- Amy Acker as Theresa
- Dempsey Bryk as Derek

== Production ==
Dave Matthews pitched the story to Jon Berg who brought the story to Lionsgate who brought it to Kevin Downes and the team at Kingdom Story Company. In March 2022, the film was officially announced with Swank and Ritchson starring, with Jon Gunn directing and writing the most recent draft of the script with Jon Erwin. Meg Tilly and Kelly Fremon Craig contributed an earlier draft and received writing credit. Filming occurred in Winnipeg in April 2022 and Albany, New York, in June 2022.

== Release ==
Ordinary Angels was released theatrically by Lionsgate on February 23, 2024, and on-demand on March 26, 2024. The film was originally scheduled to be released on October 13, 2023, before the date was delayed to avoid competition with the concert film, Taylor Swift: The Eras Tour. Shortly after, Sony Pictures Releasing International acquired some international distribution rights under the Stage 6 Films label. It was released in the United Kingdom on April 26, 2024.

== Reception ==
=== Box office ===
In the United States and Canada, Ordinary Angels was released alongside Demon Slayer: Kimetsu no Yaiba – To the Hashira Training and Drive-Away Dolls, and was projected to gross $5–7 million from 2,800 theaters in its opening weekend. It ended up debuting to $6.5 million, finishing third at the box office. The film made $3.9 million in its second weekend (a drop of just 38%), finishing third.

=== Critical response ===
On the review aggregator website Rotten Tomatoes, 84% of 102 critics' reviews are positive, with an average rating of 6.6/10. The website's consensus reads: "With a dash of grace and circumstance, this sweet display of humanity is stabilized by Hilary Swank in a role that plays to the heartstrings of all Ordinary Angels." Metacritic, which uses a weighted average, assigned the film a score of 57 out of 100, based on 16 critics, indicating "mixed or average" reviews. Audiences surveyed by CinemaScore gave the film a rare grade of "A+" on an A+ to F scale.

Courtney Howard of Variety wrote, "In Swank's capable hands, the character's predictable arc is made formidable, conjuring sympathy and strength in spades. Plus, she brings a naturalism to the scenes shared with Mitchell and Hughes, rising stars in their own right, who efficiently deliver precociousness with the right amount of potency".
