= Jon Gunn =

American film director

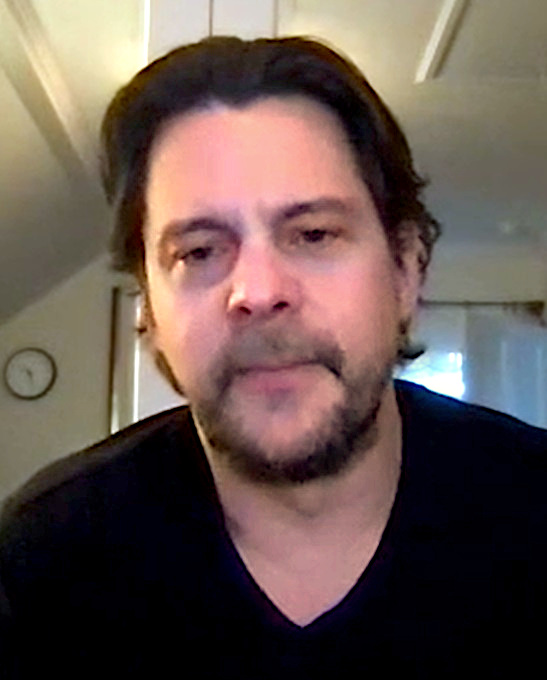
- Gunn in 2024
- Born: Jonathan Michael Gunn; United States
- Occupations: Director; Writer
- Writing career
- Period: 2000–present
- Genre: Drama

Jonathan Michael Gunn is an American independent film director and screenwriter known for his work on Christian films. His notable works include The Case for Christ (2017), Do You Believe? (2015), I Still Believe (2020), and House of David (2025), which he co-wrote.

== Filmography ==
Year	Title	Director	Writer	Producer	Editor	Notes
2000	Mercy Streets	Yes	Yes	Yes	Yes	
2004	My Date with Drew	Yes	No	Yes	Yes	Documentary film Co-directed with Brian Herzlinger and Brett Win; Also camera operator and still photographer
2009	Like Dandelion Dust	Yes	No	No	Uncredited	
2015	Do You Believe?	Yes	No	No	No	
2015	The Week	Yes	Yes	Yes	Yes	Co-directed with John W. Man; Also co-cinematographer and camera operator
2017	The Case for Christ	Yes	No	No	No	
2020	I Still Believe	No	Yes	Executive	No	
2021	American Underdog	No	Yes	Executive	No	
2023	Jesus Revolution	No	Yes	No	No	
2024	Ordinary Angels	Yes	No	No	No	
2025	The Unbreakable Boy	Yes	Yes	Executive	No	

== See also ==
- Directors with two films rated "A+" by CinemaScore
