= Erwin brothers =

American film directors and producers

Jon Erwin
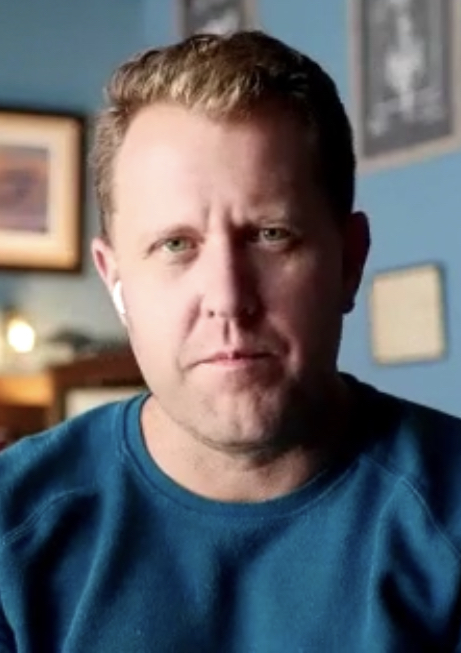
- Jon in 2021
- Born: May 19, 1982 (age 44); Birmingham, Alabama, U.S.
- Occupations: Film director, screenwriter, film producer

Andrew Erwin
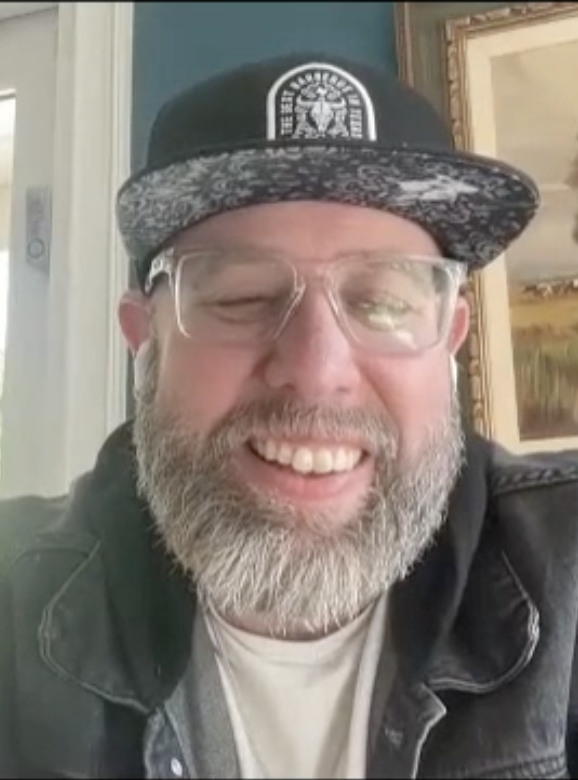
- Andrew in 2024
- Born: September 1, 1978 (age 47); Birmingham, Alabama, U.S.
- Occupations: Film director, screenwriter, film producer

Andrew and Jon Erwin, known as the Erwin Brothers, are American Christian film filmmakers known for such films as Woodlawn, October Baby, Moms' Night Out and I Can Only Imagine which have collectively grossed more than $150 million worldwide. They are the leaders and co-founders of the production company Kingdom Story Company.

== Early life ==
The Erwin brothers were born in Birmingham, Alabama. They are the children of Shelia Joyce and former state senator Hank Erwin and grandsons of Henry Eugene "Red" Erwin Sr., a Medal of Honor recipient and World War II veteran.

== Career ==
=== Early projects ===
After stopping their studies at a film school, the Erwin brothers produced The Cross and the Towers, a documentary about the steel cross found in the debris of the World Trade Center towers after September 11 attacks.

Jon Erwin served as second unit director for Alex and Stephen Kendrick's 2011 film Courageous. When asked by Alex in reference to his career, "[w]hat is your purpose?", Jon and Andrew conceived the idea for their first feature film, October Baby, a Christian pro-life drama which was released in 2011. The brothers went on to produce and direct several other faith-based films, including comedy Moms' Night Out (2014), and sports drama Woodlawn (2015).

=== Commercial breakthrough and Kingdom Story Company ===
Their 2018 music biopic I Can Only Imagine, became a surprise box-office hit with $17.1 million from 1,629 theaters during its debut weekend, and went on to become the most successful independent film of the year of 2018, as well as the third-highest grossing music biopic at the time of its release. Distributed by Lionsgate, made more in box office receipts than all of their previous films combined and is their most successful film to date, with $86 million in worldwide box office against a production budget of $7 million.

The success of I Can Only Imagine led to the founding of Kingdom Story Company, a subsidiary of Lionsgate founded by the Erwin brothers and frequent filmmaking collaborator Kevin Downes, specializing in Christian films. Some will be directed by the Erwins, while other movies will use newcomers and other veteran directors. Jon Erwin compared it to a "Christian Pixar" or "Christian Marvel". As Baptist Press put it, the company will specialize "in a specific area"—the faith-based genre—and be able to "work on multiple films at one time."

In early 2019, the Erwins revealed that their fifth film, I Still Believe, would be focusing on the life story of Christian musician Jeremy Camp. It was released on March 13, 2020.

In February 2020, Andrew Erwin related the Erwins' goal in filmmaking:

Our focus is still firmly rooted within the church, but it's focused out[.] ... And so our goal is to reach out beyond the church walls to engage a generation that's walking away from the church – as an introduction to Christianity.

— Andrew Erwin, in an interview with Christian Headlines

In 2021, they released The Jesus Music, a documentary about contemporary Christian music. They also released American Underdog, a biopic about NFL quarterback Kurt Warner. The film drew $27 million at the box office and was positively reviewed by critics.

In 2023, the brothers released Jesus Revolution, a drama about the life of the Christian men who sparked a countercultural movement in Southern California in the 1960s. Though it received mixed reviews, the film grossed $54 million on a budget of $15 million.

In 2024, they released Ordinary Angels, based on a true story during the 1994 North American cold wave. It received overwhelmingly positive reviews from critics and grossed $20 million on a $12 million budget.

=== The Wonder Project ===
In 2023, Jon Erwin founded a new studio called Wonder Project with former Netflix executive Kelly Hoogstraten "to create a trusted brand that serves the faith and values audience globally with movies and TV shows they didn’t know were possible." The new company received $100 million in seed funding from companies including Lionsgate and filmmaker Dallas Jenkins, who is a shareholder in the company. Their first project is House of David, a historical drama series which was released on Amazon Prime Video in 2025.

== Filmography ==
=== Jon Erwin ===
Year	Title	Director	Writer	Producer	Notes
2006	The Cross and the Towers	Yes	No	Yes	Documentary film Also cinematographer and editor
2011	October Baby	Yes	Yes	Yes	Also executive producer and cinematographer
2012	Fully Alive	Yes	No	No	
2014	Moms' Night Out	Yes	Yes	Yes	
2015	Woodlawn	Yes	Yes	Executive	
2017	Steve McQueen: American Icon	Yes	No	Yes	Documentary film
2018	I Can Only Imagine	Yes	Yes	Executive	
2020	I Still Believe	Yes	Yes	Yes	
2021	The Jesus Music	Yes	Yes	Executive	Documentary film
2021	American Underdog	Yes	Yes	Yes	
2023	Jesus Revolution	Yes	Yes	Yes	
2024	Ordinary Angels	No	No	Yes	
2024	The Best Christmas Pageant Ever	No	No	Yes	
2025	The Unbreakable Boy	No	No	Yes	
2025	Sarah's Oil	No	No	Yes	
2026	Young Washington	Yes	Yes	Yes	

=== Andrew Erwin ===
Year	Title	Director	Producer	Editor	Notes
2006	The Cross and the Towers	Yes	No	Yes	Documentary film
2008	Hearing Everett: The Rancho Sordo Mudo Story	No	No	Yes	Documentary film
2011	October Baby	Yes	Yes	Yes	Also story writer and executive producer
2012	Fully Alive	No	No	Yes	
2014	Moms' Night Out	Yes	Yes	Yes	
2015	Woodlawn	Yes	Executive	Yes	
2017	Steve McQueen: American Icon	No	Yes	No	Documentary film
2018	I Can Only Imagine	Yes	Executive	Yes	
2020	I Still Believe	Yes	Yes	No	
2021	The Jesus Music	Yes	Executive	No	Documentary film
2021	American Underdog	Yes	Yes	Yes	
2023	Jesus Revolution	No	Yes	No	
2024	Ordinary Angels	No	Yes	No	
2024	The Best Christmas Pageant Ever	No	No	Yes	
2025	The Unbreakable Boy	No	No	Yes	
2026	I Can Only Imagine 2	Yes	No	No	
