= CinemaScore =

Market research firm based in Las Vegas

- Type: Private
- Industry: Marketing research
- Founded: 1978; 48 years ago
- Founder: Ed Mintz
- Headquarters: Las Vegas, Nevada, U.S.
- Products: Movies ratings
- Website: cinemascore.com

CinemaScore is an American market research firm based in Las Vegas. It surveys film audiences to rate their viewing experiences with letter grades, reports the results, and forecasts box office receipts from the data.

== Background ==
Ed Mintz, who majored in math at the University of Wisconsin-Madison and founded dental billing software company Dentametics, with wife Rona attended The Cheap Detective in June 1978. He had read a positive review by a movie critic but disliked the film despite being a fan of Neil Simon, and heard another disappointed attendee wanting to hear the opinions of ordinary people, not critics. Mintz had not worked with polls or the entertainment industry, but decided to use his math and computer skills for a business surveying the opinions of hundreds of film viewers.

A Yom Kippur donation card with tabs inspired the survey cards given to audience members. The company conducts exit polls of audiences who have seen a film in theaters, asking them to rate the film and specifying what drew them to the film. Its results are published in Entertainment Weekly. CinemaScore also conducts surveys to determine audience interest in renting films on video, breaking the demographic down by age and sex and passing along information to video companies such as Fox Video Corporation.

After employees of Mintz's dental company tested the survey cards at theaters, polling began in 1979. CinemaScore at first reported its findings to consumers, including a newspaper column and a radio show. After 20th Century Fox approached the company in 1989, it began selling the data to studios instead. By the mid-1980s AMC Theatres used CinemaScore data when choosing films for its locations. A website was launched by CinemaScore in 1999, after three years' delay in which the president sought sponsorship from magazines and video companies. Brad Peppard was president of CinemaScore Online from 1999 to 2002. The website included a database of nearly 2,000 feature films and the audiences' reactions to them. Prior to the launch, CinemaScore results had been published in Las Vegas Review-Journal and Reno Gazette-Journal. CinemaScore's expansion to the Internet included a weekly email subscription for cinephiles to keep up with reports of audience reactions.

In 1999, CinemaScore was rating approximately 140 films a year, including 98–99% of major studio releases. For each film, employees polled 400–500 moviegoers in three of CinemaScore's 15 sites, which included the cities Las Vegas, Los Angeles, San Diego, Denver, Milwaukee, St. Louis, Dallas, Atlanta, Tampa, Phoenix, and Coral Springs.

In the summer of 2002, CinemaScore reported that the season had the biggest collective grade since 1995. In the summer of 2000, 25 out of 32 films received either an A or B grade. Twenty-six of the summer of 2001's 30 films got similar grades, while 32 of the summer of 2002's 34 films got similar grades, the latter being the highest ratio in a decade.

Since July 2014, CinemaScore reports its results also on Twitter.

Usually, to maintain comparable sample sizes, only films that open in more than 1,500 screens are polled and reported on CinemaScore's website and social media. The distributor of a film that opens in fewer screens can also contract with CinemaScore for a private survey, whose result would be disclosed only to the client. Some of these privately contracted surveys' results have nevertheless been publicly touted, such as the "A+" ratings for films including Courageous and A Question of Faith (both released by faith-based distributor Pure Flix Entertainment).

== Rating ==
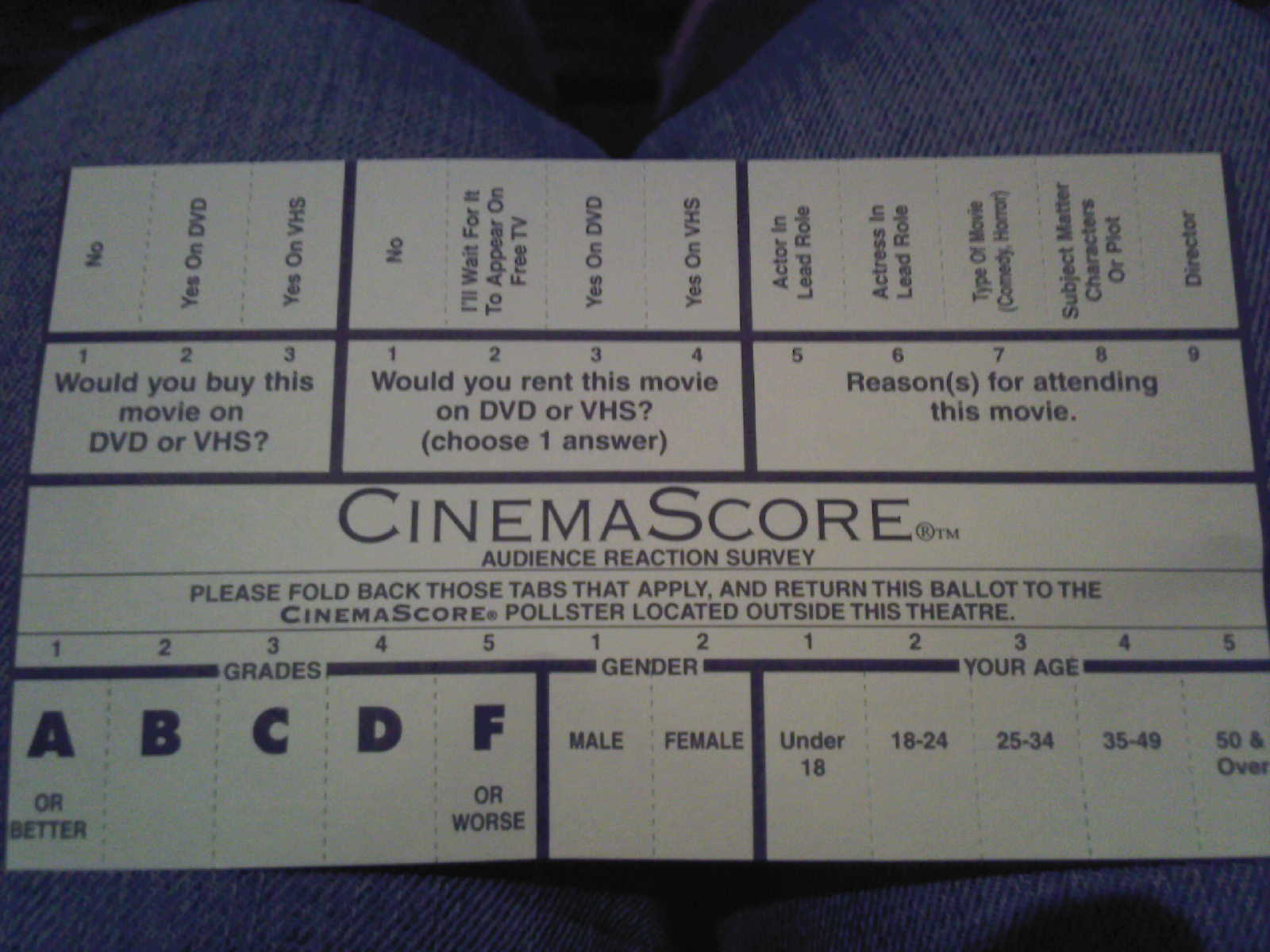
A CinemaScore survey card circa 2008

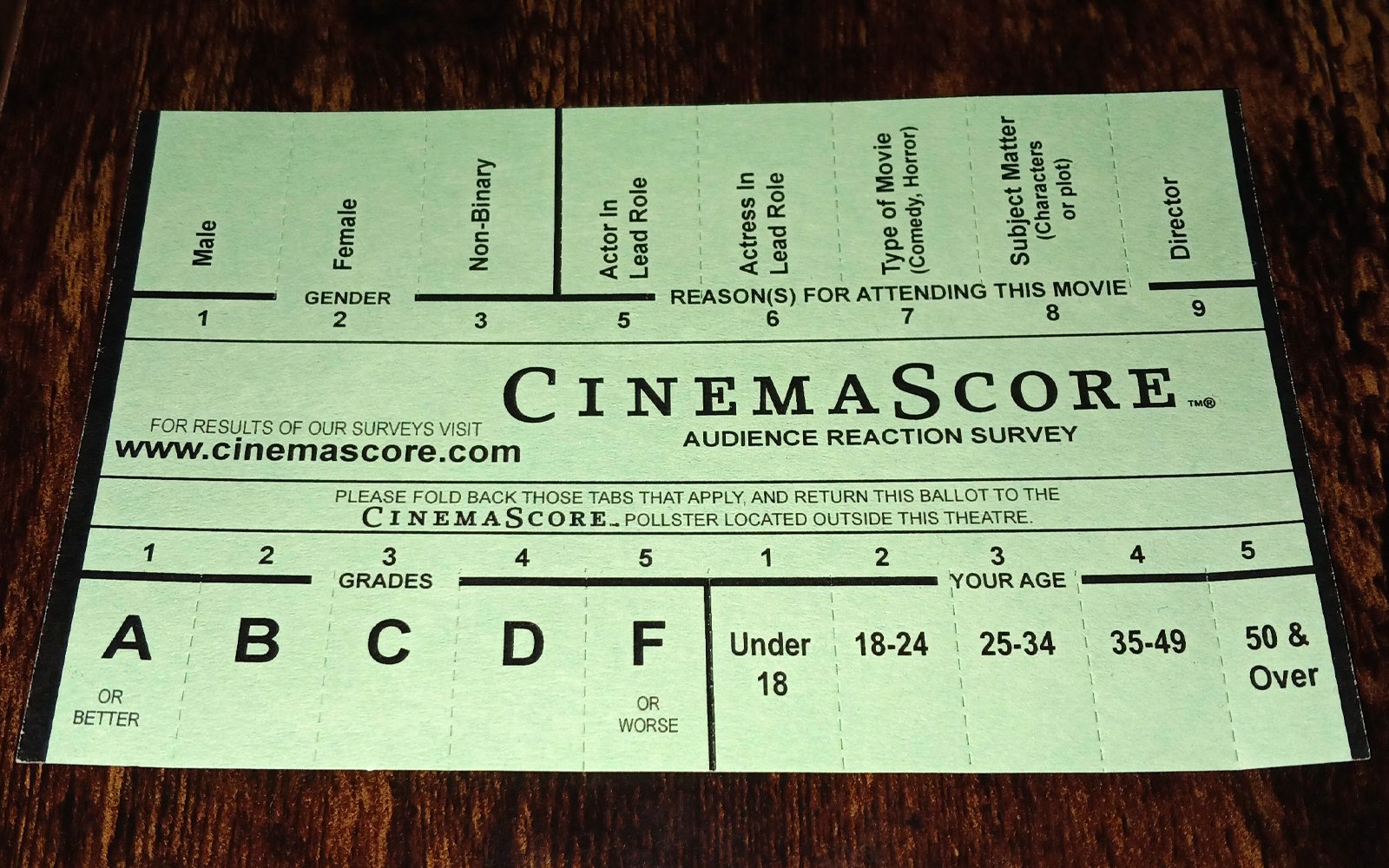
A CinemaScore survey card in 2026

CinemaScore describes itself as "the industry leader in measuring movie appeal". There are 35 to 45 teams of CinemaScore representatives present in 25 large cities across North America. Each Friday, representatives in five randomly chosen cities give opening-day audiences a small survey card. The card asks for age, gender, a grade for the film ("A", "B", "C", "D" or "F"), whether they would rent or buy the film on DVD or Blu-ray, why they chose the film and whether or not they felt the film lined up with its marketing. CinemaScore typically receives about 400 cards per film; the company estimates a 65% response rate and 6% margin of error.

An overall grade between "A+" and "F" is calculated as the average of the grades given by responders. In this case, grades other than "F" are qualified with a plus (high end), minus (low end) or neither (middle). The ratings are divided by gender and age groups (under 21, 21–34, 35 and up). Film studios and other subscribers receive the data at about 11 p.m. Pacific Time. CinemaScore publishes letter grades to the public on social media, and although the detailed data are proprietary, the grades become widely shared in news media and the film business. Subsequent advertisements for highly ranked films often cite their CinemaScore grades. Studios use the demographic data when marketing films. A studio might hope that a high grade helps the box office of a film with a disappointing opening weekend, or adjust a future film's marketing based on survey results for one with a similar demographic.

CinemaScore pollster Dede Gilmore reported the trend in 1993, "Most movies get easily a B-plus. I think people come wanting the entertainment. They have high expectations. They're more lenient with their grades. But as (moviegoers) do it more and more, they get to be stronger critics". In 1993, films that were graded with an A included Scent of a Woman, A Few Good Men and Falling Down. Films graded with a B included Sommersby and Untamed Heart. A C-grade film for the year was Body of Evidence. As opening-night audiences are presumably more enthusiastic about a film than ordinary patrons, a "C" grade from them is – according to the Los Angeles Times – "bad news, the equivalent of a failing grade". According to Ed Mintz, "A's generally are good, B's generally are shaky, and C's are terrible. D's and F's, they shouldn't have made the movie, or they promoted it funny and the absolute wrong crowd got into it". Horror films consistently score lower; The Conjuring's "A−" was the first time a horror film scored better than "B+". CinemaScore's Harold Mintz said that "An F in a horror film is equivalent to a B− in a comedy".

An "A+" typically predicts a successful box office. From 1982 to August 2011, only 52 films (about two a year) received the top grade, including seven Academy Award for Best Picture winners. From 2000 to January 2020, there were 53 movies with "A+". As of July 15, 2020, about 90 films have received "A+".

From 2004 to 2014, those rated "A+" and "A" had multiples of 4.8 and 3.6, respectively, while C-rated films' total revenue was 2.5 times their opening weekend. Ed Mintz cited Leonardo DiCaprio and Tom Cruise as the "two stars, it doesn't matter how bad the film is, they can pull (the projections) up". (DiCaprio's Shutter Island had a 3.1 revenue multiple despite a "C+" grade, and Cruise's Vanilla Sky had a 4 multiple with a "D-" grade.)

As of 2020, 22 films have received an "F" grade. Vulture wrote that besides horror,

Another type of movie features prominently on the list: let's call it "Misleading Auteurism". These are movies made by prominent, often Oscar-nominated directors that investigate risky and controversial subject matters and receive both praise and pans. But because of how the movie industry works — the name of a director alone not being enough to get most people to go see something — they tend to be marketed as more straight-ahead genre films, resulting in a whole bunch of misled and pissed-off audience members.

Vulture cited as examples of such F-graded films Steven Soderbergh's Solaris with George Clooney, Andrew Dominik's Killing Them Softly with Brad Pitt, and Darren Aronofsky's Mother! with Jennifer Lawrence.

In an essay for The Hollywood Reporter, Martin Scorsese strongly criticized this type of approach by writing: "The brutal judgmentalism that has made opening-weekend grosses into a bloodthirsty spectator sport seems to have encouraged an even more brutal approach to film reviewing. I'm talking about market research firms like CinemaScore [...]. They have everything to do with the movie business and absolutely nothing to do with either the creation or the intelligent viewing of film. The filmmaker is reduced to a content manufacturer and the viewer to an unadventurous consumer." Ed Mintz rejected being connected to Rotten Tomatoes, and defended CinemaScore methodology of polling select audiences on the opening night, to see if the film meets the expectations of the people who most want to see it. He further defended the accuracy of their data and the correlation to box office results.

CinemaScore's forecasts for box-office receipts based on the surveys are, according to the Los Angeles Times, "surprisingly accurate" as "most of [the company's] picks...are in the ballpark", in 2009 correctly predicting the success of The Hangover and the failure of Land of the Lost. Hollywood executives are divided on CinemaScore's accuracy. Rob Moore, formerly of Paramount Pictures, said Ed Mintz had an "absolute connection with the pulse of moviegoers". Jeff Goldstein of Warner Bros. described CinemaScore as "essential ... for the entertainment industry", and Dan Fellman of Warner said that the studio discontinued its own exit polling because of CinemaScore. Another Hollywood executive said "It's not always right, but it's a pretty good indicator. I rely on it". Another said that competitor PostTrak was "much better...more thorough and in-depth".

CinemaScore also conducted surveys for product placements, Anheuser-Busch, and Las Vegas casinos.

== List of "A+" films ==
As of November 2026, a total of 136 films have received an A+ rating from American audiences polled by CinemaScore.

Count	Title	Director	Year
1	Kramer vs. Kramer	Robert Benton	1979
2	The Black Stallion	Carroll Ballard	1979
3	The Empire Strikes Back	Irvin Kershner	1980
4	Fame	Alan Parker	1980
5	Ordinary People	Robert Redford	1980
6	The Elephant Man	David Lynch	1980
7	The Jazz Singer	Richard Fleischer	1980
8	Raiders of the Lost Ark	Steven Spielberg	1981
9	Superman II	Richard Lester	1981
10	This Is Elvis	Malcolm Leo	1981
10	This Is Elvis	Andrew Solt	1981
11	On Golden Pond	Mark Rydell	1981
12	E.T. the Extra-Terrestrial	Steven Spielberg	1982
13	Gandhi	Richard Attenborough	1982
14	Rocky III	Sylvester Stallone	1982
15	Return of the Jedi	Richard Marquand	1983
16	Star Trek IV: The Voyage Home	Leonard Nimoy	1986
17	The Princess Bride	Rob Reiner	1987
18	Die Hard	John McTiernan	1988
19	Dead Poets Society	Peter Weir	1989
20	Driving Miss Daisy	Bruce Beresford	1989
21	A Dry White Season	Euzhan Palcy	1989
22	Lean on Me	John G. Avildsen	1989
23	Lethal Weapon 2	Richard Donner	1989
24	When Harry Met Sally...	Rob Reiner	1989
25	Dances with Wolves	Kevin Costner	1990
26	Beauty and the Beast	Gary Trousdale	1991
26	Beauty and the Beast	Kirk Wise	1991
27	Terminator 2: Judgment Day	James Cameron	1991
28	Aladdin	John Musker	1992
28	Aladdin	Ron Clements	1992
29	A Few Good Men	Rob Reiner	1992
30	The Fugitive	Andrew Davis	1993
31	Homeward Bound: The Incredible Journey	Duwayne Dunham	1993
32	The Joy Luck Club	Wayne Wang	1993
33	Schindler's List	Steven Spielberg	1993
34	Forrest Gump	Robert Zemeckis	1994
35	Iron Will	Charles Haid	1994
36	The Lion King	Roger Allers	1994
36	The Lion King	Rob Minkoff	1994
37	Mr. Holland's Opus	Stephen Herek	1995
38	Soul Food	George Tillman Jr.	1997
39	Star Wars (1997 re-release)	George Lucas	1997
40	Titanic	James Cameron	1997
41	Mulan	Barry Cook	1998
41	Mulan	Tony Bancroft	1998
42	Music of the Heart	Wes Craven	1999
43	Toy Story 2	John Lasseter	1999
44	Finding Forrester	Gus Van Sant	2000
45	Remember the Titans	Boaz Yakin	2000
46	Monsters, Inc.	Pete Docter	2001
47	Antwone Fisher	Denzel Washington	2002
48	Drumline	Charles Stone III	2002
49	Harry Potter and the Chamber of Secrets	Chris Columbus	2002
50	Finding Nemo	Andrew Stanton	2003
51	The Lord of the Rings: The Return of the King	Peter Jackson	2003
52	The Passion of the Christ	Mel Gibson	2004
53	The Incredibles	Brad Bird	2004
54	The Polar Express	Robert Zemeckis	2004
55	Ray	Taylor Hackford	2004
56	Dreamer	John Gatins	2005
57	Diary of a Mad Black Woman	Darren Grant	2005
58	Cinderella Man	Ron Howard	2005
59	The Chronicles of Narnia: The Lion, the Witch and the Wardrobe	Andrew Adamson	2005
60	Akeelah and the Bee	Doug Atchison	2006
61	Why Did I Get Married?	Tyler Perry	2007
62	Up	Pete Docter	2009
63	The Blind Side	John Lee Hancock	2009
64	The King's Speech	Tom Hooper	2010
65	Tangled	Nathan Greno	2010
65	Tangled	Byron Howard	2010
66	Soul Surfer	Sean McNamara	2011
67	Courageous	Alex Kendrick	2011
68	Dolphin Tale	Charles Martin Smith	2011
69	The Help	Tate Taylor	2011
70	The Avengers	Joss Whedon	2012
71	Argo	Ben Affleck	2012
72	42	Brian Helgeland	2013
73	Instructions Not Included	Eugenio Derbez	2013
74	The Best Man Holiday	Malcolm D. Lee	2013
75	Frozen	Chris Buck	2013
75	Frozen	Jennifer Lee	2013
76	Mandela: Long Walk to Freedom	Justin Chadwick	2013
77	Lone Survivor	Peter Berg	2013
78	America: Imagine the World Without Her	Dinesh D'Souza	2014
78	America: Imagine the World Without Her	John Sullivan	2014
79	The Good Lie	Philippe Falardeau	2014
80	The Imitation Game	Morten Tyldum	2014
81	Selma	Ava DuVernay	2014
82	American Sniper	Clint Eastwood	2014
83	War Room	Alex Kendrick	2015
84	Un gallo con muchos huevos	Gabriel Riva Palacio Alatriste	2015
84	Un gallo con muchos huevos	Rodolfo Riva Palacio Alatriste	2015
85	Woodlawn	Erwin Brothers	2015
86	Miracles from Heaven	Patricia Riggen	2016
87	Queen of Katwe	Mira Nair	2016
88	Hidden Figures	Theodore Melfi	2016
89	Patriots Day	Peter Berg	2016
90	The Case for Christ	Jon Gunn	2017
91	Girls Trip	Malcolm D. Lee	2017
92	A Question of Faith	Kevan Otto	2017
93	Wonder	Stephen Chbosky	2017
94	Coco	Lee Unkrich	2017
95	Black Panther	Ryan Coogler	2018
96	I Can Only Imagine	Erwin Brothers	2018
97	Love, Simon	Greg Berlanti	2018
98	Incredibles 2	Brad Bird	2018
99	The Hate U Give	George Tillman Jr.	2018
100	Green Book	Peter Farrelly	2018
101	Spider-Man: Into the Spider-Verse	Bob Persichetti	2018
101	Spider-Man: Into the Spider-Verse	Peter Ramsey	2018
101	Spider-Man: Into the Spider-Verse	Rodney Rothman	2018
102	Unplanned	Chuck Konzelman	2019
102	Unplanned	Cary Solomon	2019
103	Avengers: Endgame	Anthony Russo	2019
103	Avengers: Endgame	Joe Russo	2019
104	The Peanut Butter Falcon	Tyler Nilson	2019
104	The Peanut Butter Falcon	Michael Schwartz	2019
105	Overcomer	Alex Kendrick	2019
106	Harriet	Kasi Lemmons	2019
107	Ford v Ferrari	James Mangold	2019
108	Just Mercy	Destin Daniel Cretton	2019
109	Summer of Soul	Questlove	2021
110	Show Me the Father	Rick Altizer	2021
111	Spider-Man: No Way Home	Jon Watts	2021
112	Sing 2	Garth Jennings	2021
113	American Underdog	Erwin Brothers	2021
114	Top Gun: Maverick	Joseph Kosinski	2022
115	The Woman King	Gina Prince-Bythewood	2022
116	Till	Chinonye Chukwu	2022
117	Jesus Revolution	Jon Erwin	2023
117	Jesus Revolution	Brent McCorkle	2023
118	Sound of Freedom	Alejandro Monteverde	2023
119	Taylor Swift: The Eras Tour	Sam Wrench	2023
120	Renaissance: A Film by Beyoncé	Beyoncé	2023
121	Ordinary Angels	Jon Gunn	2024
122	Unsung Hero	Richard Ramsey	2024
122	Unsung Hero	Joel Smallbone	2024
123	Sound of Hope: The Story of Possum Trot	Joshua Weigel	2024
124	The Forge	Alex Kendrick	2024
125	Super/Man: The Christopher Reeve Story	Ian Bonhôte	2024
125	Super/Man: The Christopher Reeve Story	Peter Ettedgui	2024
126	White Bird	Marc Forster	2024
127	Bob Trevino Likes It	Tracie Laymon	2025
128	The King of Kings	Seong-ho Jang	2025
129	Gabby's Dollhouse: The Movie	Ryan Crego	2025
130	Taylor Swift: The Official Release Party of a Showgirl	Taylor Swift	2025
131	Sarah's Oil	Cyrus Nowrasteh	2025
132	Kill Bill: The Whole Bloody Affair	Quentin Tarantino	2025
133	I Can Only Imagine 2	Andrew Erwin	2026
133	I Can Only Imagine 2	Brent McCorkle	2026
134	EPiC: Elvis Presley in Concert	Baz Luhrmann	2026
135	A Great Awakening	Joshua Enck	2026
136	I Play Rocky	Peter Farrelly	2026

As of November 2026, three directors have made the list four times: Jon Erwin (thrice with his brother Andrew—in 2015, 2018, and 2021—and once with Brent McCorkle in 2023), Andrew Erwin (thrice with his brother Jon—2015, 2018, and 2021—and once with Brent McCorkle in 2026), and Alex Kendrick (2011, 2015, 2019, and 2024). Three directors have made the list three times: Steven Spielberg (1981, 1982, 1993), and Rob Reiner (1987, 1989, 1992). The following directors have appeared on the list twice: James Cameron (1991, 1997), Robert Zemeckis (1994, 2004), Pete Docter (2001, 2009), Malcolm D. Lee (2013, 2017), Peter Berg (2013, 2016), Brad Bird (2004, 2018), George Tillman Jr. (1997, 2018), Jon Gunn (2017, 2024), Brent McCorkle (2023, 2026) and Peter Farrelly (2018, 2026).

Between 2011 and 2024, 19 of the 59 films (32%) to receive an A+ CinemaScore were either faith-based or specifically aimed at conservative audiences. In 2023, eight films achieved the top score, six of which targeted right-wing audiences; the other two films were concert films from Taylor Swift and Beyoncé.

As of March 2026, Star Wars's Original Trilogy, The Incredibles and I Can Only Imagine are the only three film franchises to have earned an A+ CinemaScore for every installment. Brad Bird directed both installments in the Incredibles franchise, whereas Andrew Erwin co-directed both installments in the I Can Only Imagine franchise. Though Star Wars was not polled on its initial release (CinemaScore was not founded until two years later), its special edition release was polled in 1997 and received the same "A+" grade that The Empire Strikes Back and Return of the Jedi had received in their initial releases (1980 and 1983 respectively).

== List of "F" films ==
As of February 2026, a total of 23 films have received an F rating from American audiences polled by CinemaScore.

No.	Title	Director	Year
1	Homework	James Beshears	1982
2	Bolero	John Derek	1984
3	Eye of the Beholder	Stephan Elliott	1999
4	Dr. T and the Women	Robert Altman	2000
5	Lost Souls	Janusz Kamiński	2000
6	Lucky Numbers	Nora Ephron	2000
7	Darkness	Jaume Balagueró	2002
8	Fear Dot Com	William Malone	2002
9	Solaris	Steven Soderbergh	2002
10	In the Cut	Jane Campion	2003
11	Alone in the Dark	Uwe Boll	2005
12	Wolf Creek	Greg McLean	2005
13	Bug	William Friedkin	2006
14	The Wicker Man	Neil LaBute	2006
15	I Know Who Killed Me	Chris Sivertson	2007
16	Disaster Movie	Jason Friedberg; Aaron Seltzer	2008
17	The Box	Richard Kelly	2009
18	Silent House	Chris Kentis; Laura Lau	2011
19	Killing Them Softly	Andrew Dominik	2012
20	The Devil Inside	William Brent Bell	2012
21	Mother!	Darren Aronofsky	2017
22	The Grudge	Nicolas Pesce	2020
23	The Turning	Floria Sigismondi	2020
