= American Underdog =

2021 sports drama film directed by the Erwin Brothers

- Theatrical release poster
- Directed by: Andrew Erwin; Jon Erwin
- Written by: Jon Erwin; David Aaron Cohen; Jon Gunn
- Produced by: Kevin Downes; Andrew Erwin; Jon Erwin; Mark Ciardi
- Starring: Zachary Levi; Anna Paquin; Ser'Darius Blain; Dennis Quaid
- Cinematography: Kristopher Kimlin
- Edited by: Sean Albertson; Andrew Erwin
- Music by: John Debney
- Production companies: Kingdom Story Company; Erwin Brothers Entertainment; City on a Hill Productions
- Distributed by: Lionsgate
- Release dates: December 15, 2021 (TCL Chinese Theatre); December 25, 2021 (United States)
- Running time: 112 minutes
- Country: United States
- Language: English
- Budget: $25 million
- Box office: $26.5 million

American Underdog is a 2021 American biographical sports film about National Football League (NFL) quarterback Kurt Warner. Directed by Andrew and Jon Erwin, the film follows Warner's journey as an undrafted player who ascended to winning Super Bowl XXXIV. It stars Zachary Levi as Warner, alongside Anna Paquin as his wife Brenda and Dennis Quaid as his head coach Dick Vermeil.

The film was released theatrically in the United States on December 25, 2021, by Lionsgate. It received mostly positive reviews from critics but was a box-office bomb. American Underdog was nominated for the GMA Dove Award for Inspirational Film/Series of the Year at the 2022 GMA Dove Awards.

== Plot ==
A young Kurt Warner watches Super Bowl XIX. He then makes a commitment to become a Super Bowl and MVP quarterback.

Several years later, Kurt is playing his fifth year for the University of Northern Iowa (UNI) Panthers with coach Terry Allen, and nothing is going Warner's way. Allen threatens to bench him after repeatedly not heeding his coaching, which would effectively end Warner's NFL dream. After a brutal practice following the coach's orders, Kurt continues to be the starter and his numbers climb to where he could have a chance at the Draft.

Meanwhile, Kurt becomes interested in a woman he sees dancing at a country bar, so decides to learn how to dance to impress her. Brenda is a single mom with two kids, Zack & Jesse, and is a nursing student who is struggling financially. Even though she doesn't think it will work out, Kurt is persistent, walking three miles to her house to get her number. He finds out she was a Marine corporal. Kurt instantly bonds with her disabled son, convincing her they should be together.

With his last season of college football over, Kurt anxiously awaits the draft. He doesn't get picked and wonders why God gave him a dream that he would never obtain. Later, the Green Bay Packers give him the chance to try out, but it goes badly and Kurt goes home dejected. Becoming homeless, he moves into Brenda's basement. He takes a job at a Hy-Vee grocery store, working nights stocking shelves. He discovers success is not found on the football field, but how one acts when confronted with disappointment.

Brenda's parents sell the house and move to another state, putting them in a tough situation, and the couple continue to struggle. At one point, their car runs out of gas and Kurt walks several miles in the snow to get gas.

Kurt gets approached by Jim Foster, who offers him the quarterback position for the Arena Football League's Iowa Barnstormers. Kurt agrees after discovering no one in the NFL is interested in him.

Arena football is different. The field is smaller and the play is much more fast-paced. He loses his first game but wins the next. Kurt and Brenda's relationship is strained from the long commute, and they briefly break up. Brenda's parents are killed in a tornado and she and Kurt decide to get back together. They marry and Kurt finishes the 1996 Arena Football League season with the Iowa Barnstormers in ArenaBowl X, a heartbreaking loss when his completed pass on the last play of the game comes up one yard short of the end zone.

Kurt is invited to another tryout for the St. Louis Rams. He doesn't think he will make it; he is having to re-adjust to normal football. Offensive coordinator Mike Martz berates him relentlessly for every mistake. Head Coach, Dick Vermeil, believes in him and tells Kurt he made the team. When starting quarterback Trent Green goes down with an injury in the 1999 NFL preseason, Kurt eventually takes his place.

In his first game, Kurt and the Rams face a strong Baltimore Ravens defense led by linebacker Ray Lewis. After a turnover on his first drive, Kurt picks the Ravens' defense apart. With a 27–10 lead, the Rams go into victory formation, and Warner takes a knee to end the game. He immediately gives thanks to God for the opportunity and kisses Brenda in the stands.

The Rams post a 13–3 record that season, becoming known as The Greatest Show on Turf due to the high-powered, Warner-led offense. The Rams went on to defeat the Tennessee Titans in Super Bowl XXXIV. During the game, Kurt breaks Joe Montana's record for throwing the most passing yards in a Super Bowl. Doing so helped him win Super Bowl MVP and be crowned the NFL MVP, making him the first undrafted player to be named either of those in NFL history.

The credits show that he would play in two other Super Bowls, Super Bowl XXXVI and Super Bowl XLIII. He becomes enshrined in the Pro Football Hall of Fame in 2017, and he and Brenda continue to live happily married, with two step-children Zack & Jesse and five children Kade, Jada, Elijah, Sierra & Sienna.

== Cast ==
- Zachary Levi as Kurt Warner
  - Beau Hart as Young Kurt Warner
- Anna Paquin as Brenda Meoni, Kurt's wife
- Ser'Darius Blain as Mike Hudnutt
- Bruce McGill as Jim Foster
- Hayden Zaller as Zack Meoni, Brenda's son and Kurt's stepson
- Chance Kelly as Mike Martz
- Dennis Quaid as Dick Vermeil
- Adam Baldwin as Terry Allen
- Cindy Hogan as Sue Warner, Kurt's mother
- Danny Vinson as Larry
- McKylin Rowe as Marshall Faulk
- Steven Chester Prince as Gene Warner, Kurt's father
- Bryce Bruckbauer as Matt Warner, Kurt's older brother
- Cora Wilkerson as Jesse Meoni, Brenda's daughter and Kurt's stepdaughter
- Simeon Castille as Isaac Bruce
- Brandy Shelton as Covid Nurse

== Production ==
A biopic about Kurt Warner was announced in February 2020, when Andrew and Jon Erwin were hired to direct the film, under the title American Underdog: The Kurt Warner Story. In September 2020, it was announced Zachary Levi would star as Warner. In January 2021, Anna Paquin and Dennis Quaid were among the additional cast added to the film.

Filming began on January 25, 2021, and concluded on March 6. Shooting occurred in Atlanta and Oklahoma City. The film's title was later shortened to American Underdog, with the release of the film's marketing and the announcement of the Christmas release date.

== Release ==
The film was released on December 25, 2021. It was previously scheduled to be released on December 18, 2021, but was delayed from a previous December 10, 2021 date, due to the delayed filming schedule during the COVID-19 pandemic. The film premiered at the TCL Chinese Theatre in Los Angeles on December 15, 2021.

=== Home media ===
The film was released on digital rent on February 4, 2022, and was released through Blu-ray and DVD on February 22, 2022.

== Reception ==
=== Box office ===
In the United States and Canada, American Underdog grossed $26.5 million at the box office, against a budget of $25.0 million. It was given a wide release in 2,814 theatres, in competition with A Journal for Jordan and the wide expansion of Licorice Pizza. After making about $1 million from advanced screenings the week prior to its official opening, it spent seven weeks in the top 10 at the box office.

=== Critical response ===
On the review aggregator website Rotten Tomatoes, 75% of 69 critics' reviews are positive, with an average rating of 6.6/10. The website's consensus reads: "American Underdog sticks to the standard inspirational sports drama playbook—and proves once again that it can be very effective in the right hands." Metacritic, which uses a weighted average, assigned the film a score of 53 out of 100, based on 14 critics, indicating "mixed or average" reviews. Audiences surveyed by CinemaScore gave the film a rare grade of "A+" on an A+ to F scale.

== Comparisons to real events ==
A few events from Kurt Warner's actual career were either omitted or different in the film.

The film's football scenes while Warner is in college show him playing for Northern Iowa Panthers in an outdoor stadium during games and practice. The Panthers have played indoors at the UNI-Dome since 1976. Also, while no actual facts are given about Warner's status in school, the condensed storytelling shows him watching others play and not starting games, but also during what seems to be the same season, he states it's his last year and he needs to get on the field. He made zero starts during his first three seasons and then started all 12 games his senior year, winning 1993 Offensive Player of the Year in the Gateway Conference (now the Missouri Valley Football Conference).

During his time in the Arena Football League with the Iowa Barnstormers (1995–97), the film depicts them playing their games at Wells Fargo Arena in Des Moines. Wells Fargo Arena didn't exist then. The Barnstormers played at Veterans Memorial Auditorium until 2001.

While the film is correct in showing Warner's first game as the starting quarterback was the Rams' 1999 season opener against the Ravens, it stayed silent on his brief play late in the Rams' week 17 game of their 1998 season against the 49ers, completing four of his eleven attempts for 39 yards. Warner had technically been part of the Rams longer than Trent Green, though veteran Green was signed in February 1999 to play with the Rams, while arena player Warner had signed with the Rams as a prospect in December 1997 and was dispatched to the Amsterdam Admirals of NFL Europe, rather than kept for the Rams training camp.

== See also ==
- List of American football films
