= Frisbee: The Life and Death of a Hippie Preacher =

2005 documentary film

- Directed by: David Di Sabatino
- Written by: David Di Sabatino
- Produced by: David Di Sabatino
- Starring: Lonnie Frisbee
- Release date: 2005

Frisbee: The Life and Death of a Hippie Preacher is a 2005 biographical documentary film about American Pentecostal hippie evangelist Lonnie Frisbee. It was written, produced and directed by David Di Sabatino and narrated by Jim Palosaari. The film includes interviews with Palosaari, Frisbee's ex-wife Connie Bremer, and Randy Stonehill.

Finished in March 2005, Frisbee was first accepted into the Newport Beach Film Festival where it sold out the Lido Theater, not far from where the Frisbees once ran the Blue Top Commune, a Christian community of young hippie believers.

The documentary was subsequently accepted into a variety of other festivals including the Mill Valley Film Festival (2005), ReelHeART Int'l Film Festival (2005), Ragamuffin Film Festival (2005), San Francisco International Film Festival (2006), New York Underground Film Festival (2006) and Philadelphia QFest (2006). The edited movie was shown on KQED (San Francisco) in November 2006, and was released on DVD in January 2007.

A soundtrack featuring the music of The All Saved Freak Band, Agape, Joy and Gentle Faith was released in May 2007. A pre-release version of the DVD was produced that featured 21 recordings of songs by Larry Norman alone, as well as others by Randy Stonehill, Love Song, Fred Caban, Mark Heard, and Stonewood Cross. However, due to licensing issues most of the music was changed for the final release.

== Reception ==
In Variety, Dennis Harvey wrote:

Frisbee died of AIDS in 1993, at age 44. As a last insult, his funeral service saw Chuck Smith and others taking the podium to lament how the gifted Frisbee had fallen short of his potential.

This remarkable story is told in a fast-paced, workmanlike mix of contemporary interviews and archival material, including footage from such documentaries of the period as “The Son Worshippers.” Soundtrack music flashes back to “psychedelic Christianity,” including one song’s memorable lyric: “No more LSD for me/I met the man from Galilee.”

In Good Faith Media, Tim Adams wrote:

Frisbee raises the stakes ... because the subject of this documentary was not only reported to have been involved in homosexual activity, he was also reported to have performed miracles.

Liberal Christians that openly accept gay clergy in the name of inclusiveness and diversity might hesitate to accept a gay minister who speaks in tongues, claims to have given sight to the blind or made the lame to walk. Conservative Christians might find themselves drawn to a mighty prayer warrior brave enough to walk in faith and claim the promises of scripture, but cast him aside if they found out he was involved in a same-sex relationship.

Regardless of which side you might come down on, no one can deny that God’s hand was on Lonnie Frisbee. God used an obviously flawed and broken vessel to bring thousands of people into the kingdom—just like He did in the Bible.

== See also ==
- List of films related to the hippie subculture
