= Gino Geraci =

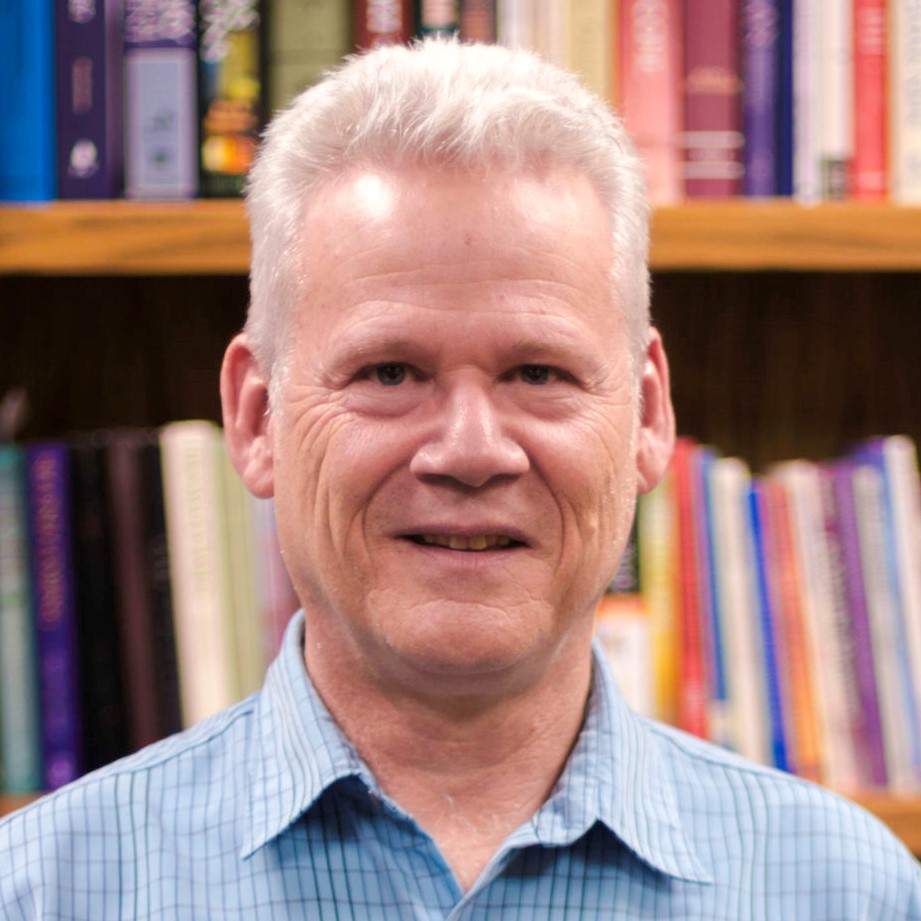
- Born: March 24, 1956 (age 70) New Orleans, Louisiana, U.S.
- Residence: Littleton, Colorado, U.S.
- Occupation: Pastor, Radio Host
- Nationality: American
- Spouse: Mary
- Children: Miguel, Anthony, Jonathan
- Website: www.ginogeraci.com

Gino Geraci is an American pastor and speaker who served as the senior pastor of Calvary South Denver in Littleton, Colorado, where he is now Pastor Emeritus. He is also the host of Christian radio talk show "Crosswalk" on Denver station KRKS-FM.

== Personal life ==
Gino Geraci was born in New Orleans, Louisiana, on March 24, 1956. He became a born-again Christian at Calvary Chapel Costa Mesa on March 3, 1973, during the Jesus Movement.

After becoming a Christian, Geraci shared his faith with friend, Skip Heitzig, who was uninterested in religion at the time. Upon hearing the gospel, Heitzig threatened Geraci by pushing him against a wall, saying he had no interest in God. Several days later however, Heitzig converted to Christianity, later citing his encounter with Gino as a primary catalyst that motivated him to change his beliefs. Heitzig is now pastor of one of the largest churches in America, Calvary Church, in Albuquerque, New Mexico.

Geraci met and married his wife, Mary, in San Bernardino, California. They have three sons, Anthony, Jonathan, and Miguel.

== Ministry ==
Geraci received his undergraduate degree (B.S.) from the University of San Francisco and he received his P.O.S.T. certification through Rio Hondo Academy. He spent seven years employed with the Department of Social Services of San Bernardino County. Geraci has served as a chaplain for the FBI, the Chino Police Department, and the Denver Police Department. He currently serves as a Police Chaplain for the Arapahoe County Sheriff’s Department. He was also a first responder during the Columbine High School massacre, the September 11 attacks, and the 2012 Aurora, Colorado shooting.

Geraci began radio broadcasting at a small station in the desert community of Apple Valley, California. He currently hosts his own radio program, called "Crosswalk", in the Denver area on local station KRKS-FM. He has made appearances on national and local radio programs as a guest, as well as television appearances with Lee Strobel’s Faith Under Fire.

Geraci identifies as an Evangelical Christian and was formerly the pastor of Calvary South Denver in Littleton, Colorado. He has been interviewed by local and national news outlets on current stories and has conducted leadership, bible, and pastor’s conferences throughout the United States, many of which are politically conservative in nature. Some of these conferences have been associated with the Billy Graham Evangelistic Association, the Samaritan's Purse, and Gospel for Asia.
