= List of films related to the hippie subculture =

This is a list of fiction and documentary films about or relating to the hippie counterculture of the 1960s and 1970s.

== Feature films ==
=== 1960s ===
- The Acid Eaters (1968)
- Alice in Acidland (1969)
- Alice's Restaurant (1969)
- The Big Cube (1969)
- Blowup (1966)
- The Born Losers (1967)
- Candy (1968)
- Chappaqua (1967)
- Easy Rider (1969)
- Eggshells (1969)
- The Guru (1969)
- The Happening (1967)
- Head (1968)
- The Hellcats (1968)
- How to Commit Marriage (1969)
- I Love You, Alice B. Toklas (1968)
- The Love-Ins (1967)
- The Love Bug (1968)
- Magical Mystery Tour (1967)
- Maryjane (1968)
- Medium Cool (1969)
- Midnight Cowboy (1969)
- More (1969)
- The Party (1968)
- El Profesor Hippie (1969, Spanish)
- Psych-Out (1968)
- Riot on Sunset Strip (1967)
- Skidoo (1968)
- Three in the Attic (1968)
- The Trip (1967)
- What's New Pussycat? (1965)
- Wild in the Streets (1968)
- With Six You Get Eggroll (1968)
- Wonderwall (1968)
- Yellow Submarine (1968)

=== 1970s ===
- 200 Motels (1971)
- An American Hippie in Israel a.k.a. Ha-Trempist (1972)
- Beyond the Valley of the Dolls (1970)
- Billy Jack:
  - Billy Jack (1971)
  - The Trial of Billy Jack (1974)
  - Billy Jack Goes to Washington (1977)
- Breezy (1973)
- Brother Sun, Sister Moon (1972)
- Butterflies Are Free (1972)
- Captain Milkshake (1970)
- La Familia Hippie (1971, Spanish)
- Fantastic Planet (1973, French)
- Fritz the Cat:
  - Fritz the Cat (1972)
  - The Nine Lives of Fritz the Cat (1974)
- Gas-s-s-s (1971)
- Ghetto Freaks a.k.a. Love Commune (1970)
- Ginger in the Morning (1974)
- Go Ask Alice (1973)
- Godspell (1973)
- Groupie Girl (1970)
- Hair (1979)
- Harold And Maude (1971)
- Hare Rama Hare Krishna (1971, Hindi)
- Helter Skelter (1976)
- The Holy Mountain (1973)
- I Drink Your Blood (1970)
- Jesus Christ Superstar (1973)
- Joe (1970)
- Katherine (1975)
- The Last Movie (1971)
- La Vallée a.k.a. Obscured By Clouds (1972) Director:Barbet Schroeder
- Love Story (1970)
- The Magic Garden of Stanley Sweetheart (1970)
- More American Graffiti (1979)
- Performance (1970)
- Punishment Park (1971)
- The Psychedelic Priest a.k.a. Electric Shades of Grey (1971)
- Rainbow Bridge (1972)
- Shalom (1973, Hebrew)
- The Song Remains the Same (1976) - features 1973 Led Zeppelin concert footage
- The Strawberry Statement (1970)
- Taking Off (1971)
- Thumb Tripping (1972)
- Two-Lane Blacktop (1971)
- Up in Smoke (1978)
- When You Comin' Back, Red Ryder? (1979)
- Wild Honey (1972)
- Woodstock (1970)
- Zabriskie Point (1970)
- Zachariah (1971)
- Zardoz (1973)

=== 1980s ===
- 1969 (1988)
- The Big Chill (1983)
- Cheech & Chong:
  - Cheech & Chong's Next Movie (1980)
  - Nice Dreams (1981)
  - Things Are Tough All Over (1982)
  - Still Smokin' (1983)
- Purple Haze (1982)
- Rude Awakening (1989)
- Where the Buffalo Roam (1980)
- Withnail and I (1987)

=== 1990s ===
- The Big Lebowski (1998)
- Dazed and Confused (1993)
- The Doors (1991)
- Far Out Man (1990)
- Fear and Loathing in Las Vegas (1998)
- Flashback (1990)
- Forrest Gump (1994)
- Hideous Kinky (1998)
- A Walk on the Moon (1999)

=== 2000s ===
- Across the Universe (2007)
- Almost Famous (2000)
- Born in 68 (2008)
- The Dreamers (2003)
- The Tripper (2006)
- Humboldt County (2008)
- I'm Not There (2007)
- Into the Wild (2007)
- The Manson Family (2003)
- Helter Skelter (2004)
- Stoned (2005)
- The Grateful Undead (2007)
- A Mighty Wind (2003)
- The Rage in Placid Lake (2003)
- Steal This Movie! (2000)
- Taking Woodstock (2009)
- Leslie, My Name Is Evil (2009)
- Youth in Revolt (2009)
- Wood & Stock: Sexo, Orégano e Rock'n'Roll (2006, Brazilian)
- Pineapple Express (2008)
- Smiley Face (2007)
- Das Wilde Leben a.k.a. Eight Miles High (2007, German)

=== 2010s ===
- Happiness Runs (2010)
- Hippie Hippie Shake (unreleased)
- The House of the Sun (2010, Russian)
- The Music Never Stopped (2011)
- Our Idiot Brother (2011)
- Wanderlust (2012)
- Peace, Love & Misunderstanding (2012)
- Something in the Air (2012)
- Inherent Vice (2014)
- Wild (2014)
- Paradise Trips (2015)
- Moonwalkers (2015)
- Charlie (2015)
- Captain Fantastic (2016)
- Manson's Lost Girls (2016)
- The Glass Castle (2017)
- Woodstock or Bust (2018)
- Charlie Says (2018)
- The Haunting of Sharon Tate (2019)
- Once Upon a Time in Hollywood (2019)

== Documentary films ==
- Back to the Garden, flower power comes full circle (2009), hippies in Washington state, U.S.
- Berkeley in the Sixties (1990)
- Beyond this Place (2010), imdb a man meets his absent hippie father for the first time
- Charles Manson Superstar (1989)
- The Cockettes (2002)
- Commune (2005), about the Black Bear Ranch
- Conventions: The Land Around Us (1968), at 1968 Democratic National Convention
- Crumb (1994), about underground comix artist Robert Crumb
- Dont Look Back (1967)
- F.T.A. (1972)
- Feast of Friends (1970) - The Doors' self-produced documentary filmed in 1968, released in 2014
- Frisbee: The Life and Death of a Hippie Preacher (2005), about Lonnie Frisbee
- Gone for a Better Deal (1974), documentary from Will Vinton about the California counter-culture including a section about life on a commune
- Gonzo: The Life and Work of Dr. Hunter S. Thompson (2008)
- Hippie Masala (2006), Swiss documentary about the hippies who live in India.
- Hippie Movie (2008, Polish/English)
- Huerfano Valley (2012, English), about a 40 years old hippie commune in Colorado. Three residents share their experiences and talk of the evolutions in the way of living in the commune during all these years.
- The Hippie Revolt a.k.a. Something's Happening (1967)
- Jimi Hendrix (1973), various interviews of people who knew Hendrix before and when he was famous
- Jobs (2013)
- Die Karawane der Blumenkinder (2008, German), documentary on the Hippie trail
- Karl Hess: Toward Liberty (1980), documentary about Republican speechwriter turned anarchist
- Klunkerz: A Film About Mountain Bikes (2006)
- Last Hippie Standing (2002), on hippies in Goa with Cleo Odzer
- '’Life and Times of the Red Dog Saloon, The'’ (1996)
- Magic Trip (2011) Ken Kesey and the Merry Pranksters' bus adventures
- Inside LSD (2009), an explorer puts LSD under the microscope
- Manson (1973)
- MC5: A True Testimonial (2002)
- Mondo Mod (1967)
- My Generation (2000)
- My Hippies (2005) Reflection from two couples living in Haight Ashbury in the sixties.
- Project Nim (2011), interviews and footage of the free and expressive upbringing of a chimpanzee taught sign language in the 1970s.
- Ram Dass Fierce Grace (2001)
- Revolution (1968)
- Saint Misbehavin': The Wavy Gravy Movie (2008)
- The Source Family (2012), the commune of the same name, first in Los Angeles, then Hawaii, centered around Father Yod.
- Taylor Camp: Living the 60s Dream (2010), nostalgic reflections of 1970s hippies in tree houses in Hawaii.
- Tripping (1999)
- The Valley of the Moon (2010)
- Underground (1976)
- The U.S. vs. John Lennon (2006)
- Volem Rien Foutre al Païs (2006, French)
- The Weather Underground (2002)
- Within Reach Movie, journey to find sustainable community (2013)
- Where Have All the Flowers Gone? (2008), a group of young people visit San Francisco

=== Concert films ===
- The 14 Hour Technicolor Dream (2008), a documentary about the 1967 concert
- Festival Express (2003)
- Fillmore (1972)
- Gimme Shelter (1970)
- Glastonbury Fayre (1972)
- Medicine Ball Caravan (1971)
- Monterey Pop (1968)
- Nambassa Festival (1980)
- '’Rockin’ at the Red Dog: The Dawn of Psychedelic Rock'’ (2005)
- Woodstock (1970)

== Short films ==
See external links section

- "Brink of Disaster!" (1972)
- "Curses and Sermons", documentary about poet Michael McClure
- "Drug Abuse: The Chemical Tomb" (1969)
- "Greenwich Village Sunday"
- "Quantum Satori" (Samuel Vanclooster, 2015)

== Television ==
- The '60s (1999–2005)
- All in the Family (1971–1979)
- The Banana Splits (1968–1970)
- Batman (1966–1968)
- The Brady Bunch (1969–1974)
- The Bugaloos (1970–1972)
- Chico and the Man (1974–1978)
- The Dick Cavett Show (1968–1975)
- Dragnet 1967 (1967–1970) often portrayed hippies pejoratively
- The Electric Company (1971–1985)
- Family Ties (1982–1989)
- Hippies (1999)
- Hippy Gourmet (2001-)
- H.R. Pufnstuf (1969–1971)
- Kung Fu (1972–1974)
- Lancelot Link, Secret Chimp (1970–1971)
- Lidsville (1971–1973)
- Love, American Style (1969–1974)
- Mad Men (2007–2015)
- The Mod Squad (1968–1973)
- The Monkees (1966–1968)
- Mulligan Stew (1972)
- The Partridge Family (1970–1974)
- Room 222 (1969–1974)
- Rowan & Martin's Laugh-In (1968–1973)
- The Smothers Brothers Comedy Hour (1967–1969)
- The Sonny & Cher Comedy Hour (1971–1974)
- Star Trek (1966–1969), hippie episode "The Way to Eden" first broadcast on 21 February 1969
- Summerhill (2008)
- WKRP in Cincinnati (1978–1982)
- The Wonder Years (1988–1993)
- The Young Ones (1982–1984)
- The Drug Years (2006)

=== Animated ===
- The Beatles (1965–1967)
- Cattanooga Cats (1969–1971)
- Groovie Goolies (1970–1972)
- Help!... It's the Hair Bear Bunch! (1971–1974)
- The Magic Roundabout (1965–1977)
- Scooby-Doo, Where Are You! (1969–1970) and Scooby-Doo successors to present

== See also ==
- Hippie exploitation films
- Acid Western
- List of psychedelic documentaries
