= Calvary Chapel Bible College =

American Christian College

Coordinates: 27.4645°N 82.5943°W

- Former name: Calvary Chapel Bible School (-1989)
- Established: 1975
- Founder: Pastor Chuck Smith
- Accreditation: Candidate status, Association for Biblical Higher Education (2025)
- President: Pastor Justin Thomas
- Students: 200+
- Location: Bradenton, Florida (2025-Present) Twin Peaks, California (1974-94, 2022-2025) Murrieta, California (1994 - Summer 2022), Bradenton, USA
- Website: https://calvarychapelbiblecollege.com/

Calvary Chapel Bible College is an evangelical Christian Biblical studies college located at 4200 32nd St. W. in Bradenton, Florida. Established in 1975 in Twin Peaks, the campus relocated to Murrieta Hot Springs in Murrieta, California from 1994 to Summer 2022. In July 2022, C.C.B.C. returned to the original Twin Peaks site after nearly 30 years away until 2025. In July 2025, C.C.B.C. relocated to Bradenton, Florida. It was founded as a ministry of Calvary Chapel Costa Mesa and now operates as an independent institution which runs on a 15-week spring and fall semester schedule with summer classes. C.C.B.C offers classes live on their Florida campus and online.

== History ==
In Spring of 1975, Calvary Chapel Bible School was established at the former Monte Vista Resort in the heart of Twin Peaks, California. Originally a very "short, intensive residential study program".

CCBC Florida's front entrance

CCBC Library holds over 14,000 books for on-campus students to use in their studies.

Lake on CCBC campus

The college rapidly grew and was renamed Calvary Chapel Bible College (C.C.B.C.).

In 1994, C.C.B.C. relocated to Murrieta Hot Springs where it thrived alongside Murrieta Hot Springs Christian Conference Center for almost 3 decades before returning to the original site. The college relocated again in 2025 to Bradenton, Florida.

== Academics ==
C.C.B.C. offers full programs leading to two and four-year degrees. It has articulation agreements where credits can be transferred to schools including Liberty University and Azusa Pacific University.

== Certificates and degrees ==
Calvary Chapel Bible College offers two degree programs: the Associate of Biblical Studies and the Bachelor of Biblical Studies. Both programs are available through on-campus and online study. The Associate of Biblical Studies is a two-year degree requiring 60 credits, while the Bachelor of Biblical Studies is a four-year degree requiring 120 credits. Both programs dedicate approximately 50% of coursework to Bible classes, with an emphasis on studying Scripture and developing a biblical foundation for life and ministry..

== Notable alumni ==
- Jeremy Camp, Christian Singer and Songwriter
- Daniel Singh, Wyoming State Representative

== Notable faculty ==
- Chuck Smith, Calvary Chapel founder
- Skip Heitzig, megachurch pastor and police chaplain

== See also ==
- Higher education accreditation in the United States
