= House of Miracles =

House of Miracles may refer to:

- House of Miracles (communal house), a series of Christian communal houses
- House of Miracles (The Vels album), 1986
- House of Miracles (Brandon Lake album), 2020
