= Alejandro Alonso =

Alejandro Alonso may refer to:

- Alejandro Alonso (field hockey) (born 1999), Spanish field hockey player
- Alejandro Alonso (footballer) (born 1982), Argentinian football player
- Alejandro Alonso (musician) (1952–2022), Mexican musician
- Alejandro Alonso Núñez (born 1951), Spanish politician
