= Erskine Holt =

American pastor (1915–2003)

Erskine Leo Holt (February 8, 1915 – July 11, 2003) was Christian minister, missionary and religious leader who established many independent House Church communities throughout the United States. He was one of the founders of the Pan-American Mission and later founded Corvilla, a Christian retreat center in Zephyrhills, Florida.

== Biography ==
Erskine Holt was born of February 8, 1915, in Muncie, Indiana, to Joseph Leroy Holt and Lily Pearl Lucas. At 15, Holt enrolled in college, the youngest student to attend Ball State College, graduating with a degree in chemistry. After college he was employed in a variety of roles, including an auditor at the Muncie Gear Works.

=== Early religious mission ===
Following a religious experience in 1943, Holt redirected his life towards the ministry, attending Central Bible Institute, an Assemblies of God Bible school in Springfield, Missouri. Following his graduation in 1947, he served in the Assemblies of God as a pastor and evangelist, both in the United States and in Africa. He was also designated the national soloist for the Assemblies of God with a daily radio program.

In 1947 the Latter Rain Revival, precursor to the Latter Rain Movement emerged in the Assemblies of God and Holt associated himself with that movement. When the movement was rejected by the leadership of the Assemblies of God, Holt and a number of other adherents were dismissed or resigned from the Assemblies of God. Holt, along with Donald W. Murphy, former missionary to India and Illinois District Superintendent for the Assemblies, joined Dr. Thomas Wyatt at the Wings of Healing Temple in Portland, Oregon. Holt also spent time at Bethesda Missionary Temple in Detroit, Michigan, the spiritual center of the Latter Rain Revival, founded by Myrtle Beall. It was during this period that Holt met and married Lucille Hamer. In 1950, Holt and his wife Lucille moved to Portland, Oregon, where he served as Dean of the Bethesda Bible Institute until 1954 and was also on staff at the Wings of Healing Temple. He additionally sang on the international Wings of Healing radio broadcast.

In November 1953, Holt, along with Max Wyatt, Paul Shaver, and Paul Cannon, met Thomas Wyatt and Raymond G. Hoekstra in Ibadan, where they held large revival meetings at the race track, drawing thousands of attendees. Reports described nightly healings and miracles. After completing these gatherings, the group traveled to Accra, then part of the Gold Coast, where similar meetings took place.

After about a week, Dr. Wyatt and Hoekstra returned home, while Holt and Max Wyatt remained for an additional month, leaving the two younger men to continue holding meetings across Ghana and Nigeria. After leaving the Bible school, Holt went on to found Shiloh Temple in Muncie, Indiana.

In 1959, Holt co-founded Pan-American Mission, first out of Columbia. This would grow across all of the Americas, so that by the 1980s it encompassed more than 100 churches, multiple airplanes and radio stations.

=== Jesus movement ===
He was a significant contributor to the Jesus movement of the 1970s. In that decade he founded Corvilla, a Christian retreat center in Zephyrhills, Florida. Corvilla was started out of a trailer and divided the surrounding land to Christians from around the country. He was also organized a series of house church congregations. As the Jesus movement came to its quick end, many of the house churches he formed or nurtured moved into forming established churches, including Calvary Chapel.

After the demise of the Jesus movement, Holt continued to travel throughout the United States, and on occasion to other nations. He continued to visit "remnant" groups of Christians, such as those in house churches and informal Bible study gatherings that were not connected to any denomination or structure.

Holt was a follower of Charismatic Christianity and believed in traditional Pentecostal gifts, such as speaking in tongues. He strongly advocated a teaching known as five-fold ministry.

== Personal life ==
Holt was married to Lucille Holt, with whom he had 3 daughters. He died, at the age of 88, on the July 11, 2003 in Zephyrhills.
