= Andrew Server =

American politician

Member-elect of the Wyoming House of Representatives from the 61st district
- Assuming office January 2027
- Succeeding: Daniel Singh

Personal details
- Party: Republican

Andrew Server is an American politician. A member of the Republican Party, he is the member-elect for the 61st district of the Wyoming House of Representatives.
