= WYVL =

Radio station in Youngsville, Pennsylvania

- Youngsville, Pennsylvania; United States
- Broadcast area: Jamestown, New York
- Frequency: 88.5 MHz
- Branding: Dove FM

Programming
- Format: Christian contemporary music

Ownership
- Owner: Calvary Chapel of Russell
- Sister stations: WZDV

History
- First air date: November 2, 1998
- Call sign meaning: Youngsville

Technical information
- Licensing authority: FCC
- Facility ID: 89403
- Class: A
- ERP: 2,500 watts
- HAAT: 130 meters (430 ft)
- Transmitter coordinates: 41°54′08.0″N 79°15′40.8″W

Links
- Public license information: Public file; LMS
- Webcast: Listen Live
- Website: http://dovefm.org/

WYVL is a radio station airing a Christian contemporary music format licensed to Youngsville, Pennsylvania, broadcasting on 88.5 FM. The station is owned by Calvary Chapel of Russell, Pennsylvania.

WYVL also airs blocks of Christian Talk and Teaching programming early mornings and late evenings including; Truth for Life with Alistair Begg, Word for Today with Chuck Smith, and A New Beginning with Greg Laurie.

== History ==
In its first several years of operation, WYVL operated a Christian-oriented classic rock format. The station adopted a more conventional contemporary Christian music format February 1, 2016.

== Simulcasts ==
WYVL's programming is simulcast on WTWT 90.5 in Bradford, Pennsylvania and WZDV 92.1 in Amherst, New York, as well as a translator at 98.7 MHz in Jamestown, New York. WZDV is officially operated as a joint venture between Calvary Chapel of Russell and Calvary Chapel of the Niagara Frontier.

An additional full-service signal, WGIP 89.1 in Tidioute, Pennsylvania, was sold to rival religious broadcaster Family Life Network in May 2020 in exchange for forgiveness of a debt and was eventually relocated to Union City, Pennsylvania as WCGT.

| Call sign | Frequency | City of license | Facility ID | ERP W | Height m (ft) | Class |
|---|---|---|---|---|---|---|
| WTWT | 91.5 FM | Bradford, Pennsylvania | 172674 | 2,500 | 173 m (568 ft) | B1 |
| WZDV | 92.1 FM | Amherst, New York | 185147 | 1,400 | 94 m (308 ft) | A |

Broadcast translator for WTWT
| Call sign | Frequency | City of license | FID | ERP (W) | HAAT | Class | FCC info |
|---|---|---|---|---|---|---|---|
| W254AQ | 98.7 FM | Jamestown, New York | 141663 | 10 | 88.4 m (290 ft) | D | LMS |
