= Jesus Freaks International =

Voluntary association

- Symbol of Jesus Freaks; Alpha and Omega
- Formation: September 1991
- Founder: Martin Dreyer
- Headquarters: Germany
- Fields: Christian youth organization

Jesus Freaks International is a German evangelical Christian youth organization. The movement uses the Alpha and Omega symbol to represent Jesus Christ.

== History ==
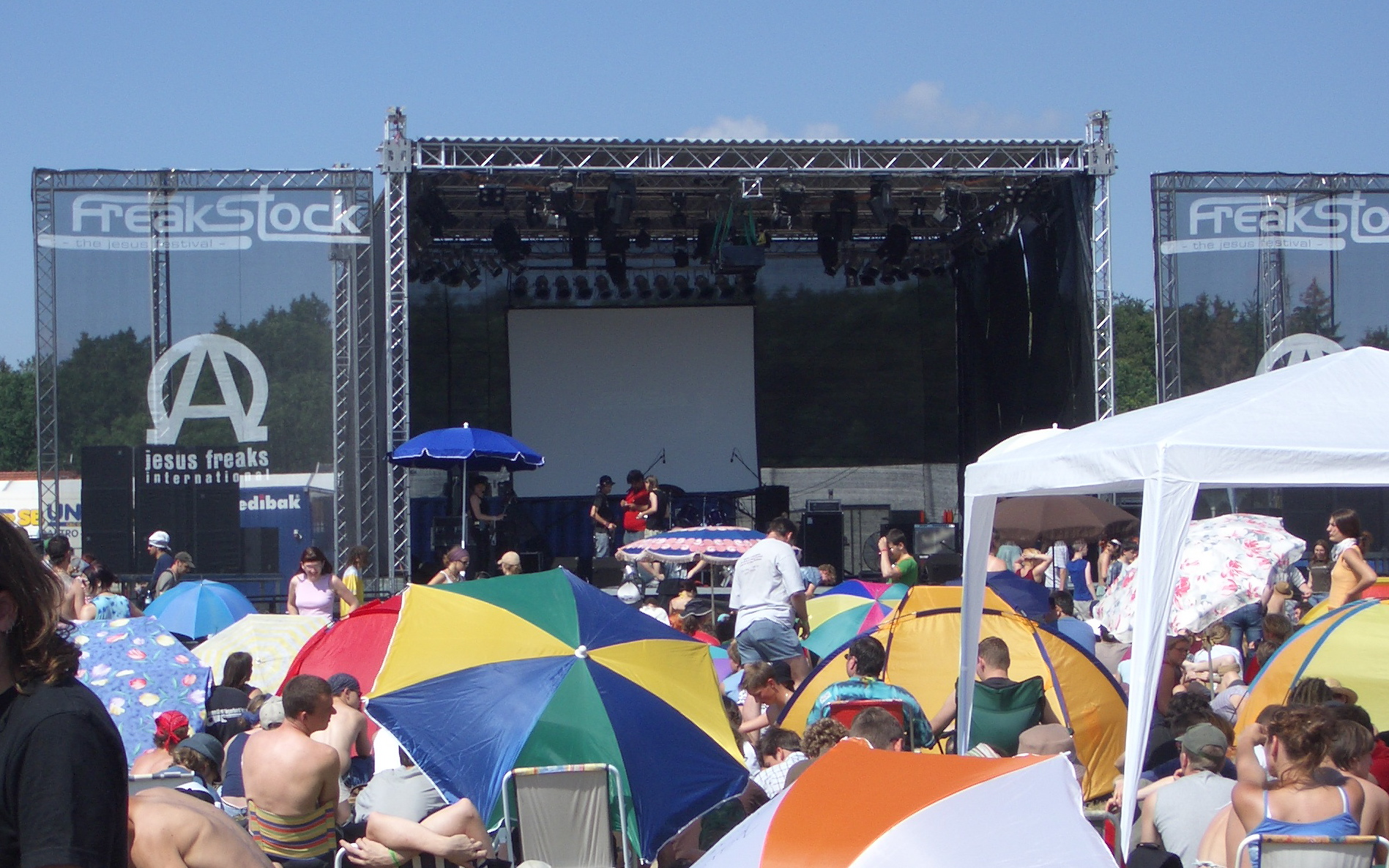
Freakstock main stage in 2004

The Jesus Freaks movement was created in September 1991 in Hamburg, Germany by Martin Dreyer. It was linked to the Anskar Kirche in Hamburg, led by Wolfram Kopfermann, as well as the Vineyard New York, led by Mike Turrigiano, and inspired by YWAM Amsterdam and the ministry of David Pierce.

Jesus Freaks had above 100 churches at their peak in the 1990 in Germany, as well as spread to Netherlands, Switzerland, Austria, Czech Republic, and Denmark.

The Jesus Freaks run an annual open air festival "Freakstock" since 1996 with up to 7,000 participants. They published a magazine "Kranke Bote" ("the sick patient") as well as run a network camp "Willo Freak".

The six core values of the Jesus Freaks movement during the founding years were:

1. Being loud and provocative ("Schrill und laut sein")
2. Trying new things ("Neue Sachen ausprobieren")
3. Being leaders, not followers ("Kopf sein, und nicht Schwanz")
4. Reaching out beyond the Christian community ("Raus aus dem christlichen Ghetto")
5. Building bridges to non-believers ("Brücke sein")
6. Fostering a gang-like community ("Wir sind eine Gang")

The movement advocates for unconventional and provocative approaches to worship, including the use of rock music, laser shows, and public demonstrations. Jesus Freaks seek to bridge the gap between traditional Christianity and contemporary youth culture, operating venues like bars and music clubs to attract non-believers. They promote a "gang-like" sense of community and identity among members, encouraging a radical lifestyle centered on Jesus. While not considered a sect, the Jesus Freaks' rejection of traditional church practices and their subculture-oriented approach have raised questions about their place within the broader Christian ecumenical community.

Duane Pederson, who became one of the primary voices in the Jesus Movement in the United States during the 1970s, see parallels between that movement and the new German one. Specifically, both movements were created from grass roots.

== Criticism ==
Critics cite the movement as leaning towards conservative fundamentalism, and having the appearance of a closed society with a high level of peer pressure internally. However, they point out that they provide ministry to drug abusers, the homeless, and others often marginalized by the mainstream church.
