= Calvary Chapel Association =

Evangelical association of Christian churches

Calvary Chapel
- Classification: Christian
- Orientation: Evangelical charismatic
- Polity: "Moses Model" (modified Congregational polity)
- Founder: Chuck Smith (1927–2013)
- Origin: 1965
- Separated from: Pentecostalism (The Foursquare Church)
- Branched from: Jesus movement
- Separations: Vineyard Movement
- Congregations: 1,800
- Official website: Calvary Chapel Association: calvarycca.org Calvary Chapel Global Network: calvaryglobalnetwork.com

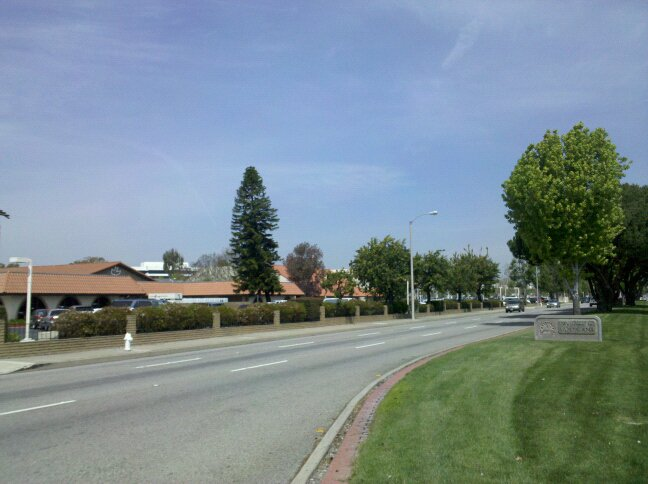
Calvary Chapel Costa Mesa

Calvary Chapel is an international association of charismatic evangelical churches, with origins in Pentecostalism. It maintains a number of radio stations around the world and operates many local Calvary Chapel Bible College programs.

Beginning in 1965 in Southern California, this fellowship of churches grew out of Chuck Smith's Calvary Chapel Costa Mesa. It became a hub of the Jesus Movement in the late 1960s through connections with Lonnie Frisbee and John Higgins, attracting thousands of young converts and fostering contemporary Christian music through Maranatha! Music. Known for its verse-by-verse Bible teaching, casual style of worship, and emphasis on expository preaching, the movement expanded into a worldwide fellowship of independent churches. Calvary Chapel identifies as neither a denomination nor strictly Pentecostal. It holds to evangelical doctrine with charismatic practices like tongues and prophecy while maintaining a strong pretribulationist, premillennialist eschatology.

The movement faced controversies, including leadership disputes that led to the split between the Calvary Chapel Association and Global Network, and controversies around accountability and sexual abuse cases.

Calvary Chapel remains influential through its Bible college, radio stations, and Harvest Crusades.

Many well-known pastors and musicians, such as Greg Laurie, Skip Heitzig, Switchfoot, and P.O.D., have roots in Calvary Chapel.

== History ==
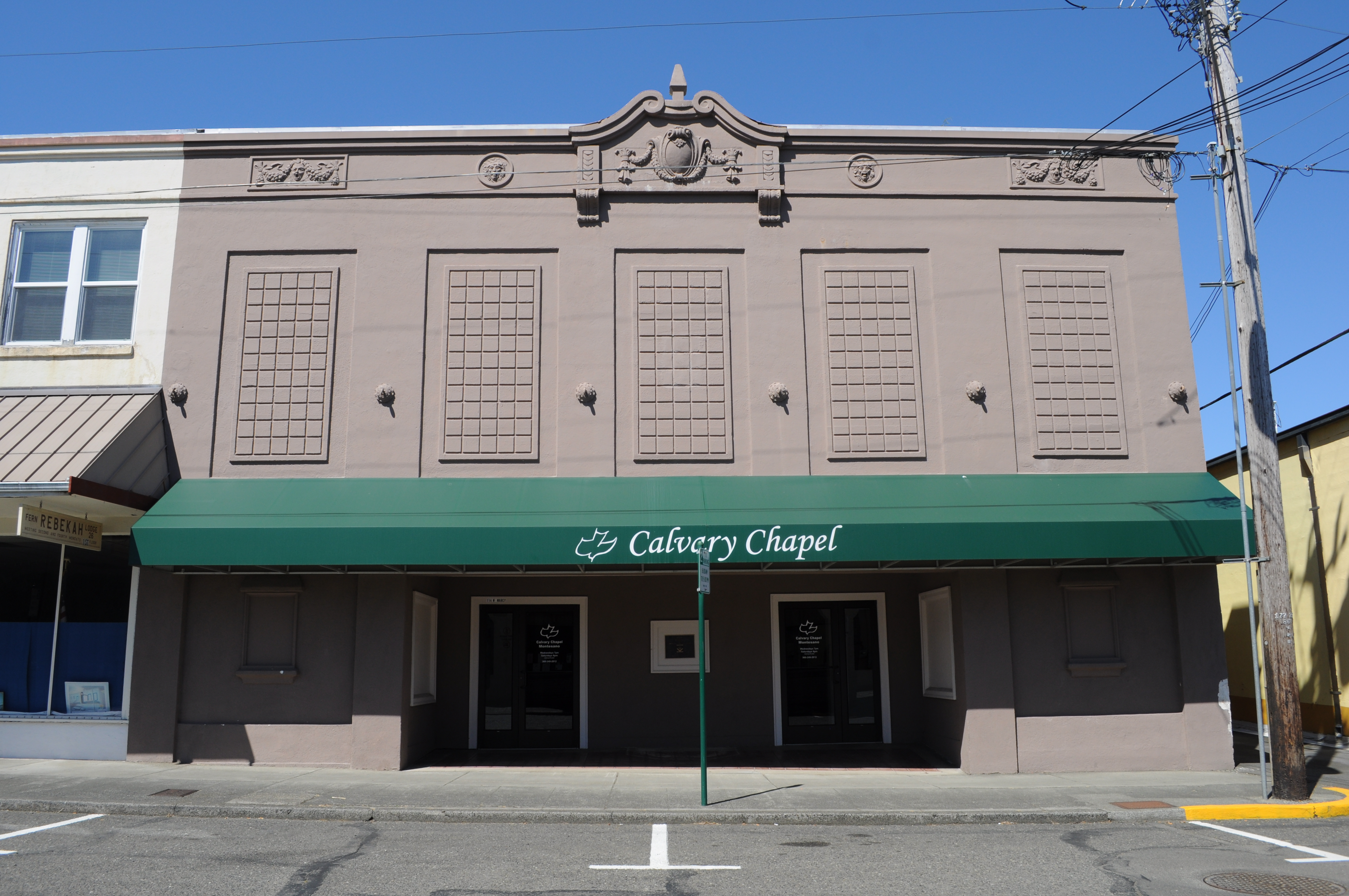
A Calvary Chapel, housed in the former Montesano Theatre, Montesano, Washington

The association has its origins in the founding of a Calvary Chapel Costa Mesa (California) in 1965 by pastor Chuck Smith of the International Church of the Foursquare Gospel with 25 people.In 1968 they broke away from Foursquare Church. Prior to Smith, Costa Mesa members spoke of their own vision of becoming part of a massive church movement.

In 1969, Calvary Chapel became a hub in what later became known as the Jesus movement when Smith's daughter introduced him to her boyfriend John Higgins Jr., a former hippie who had become a christian, and who went on to head the largest Jesus freak movement in history, the Shiloh Youth Revival Centers (1968–1989).

John Higgins introduced Smith to Lonnie Frisbee, the "hippie evangelist" who became a key figure in the growth of both the Jesus Movement and Calvary Chapel. Frisbee moved into Smith's home, and he would minister to other hippies and counter-culture youth on the beaches. At night, he would bring home new converts, and soon Smith's house was full. Frisbee became leader in a rental home for the steadily growing crowd of Christian hippies and he named the commune "House of Miracles"; other Houses of Miracles would develop throughout California and beyond. As Calvary Chapel grew "explosively", a tent was erected during the construction of a new building.

The converts included musicians who began writing music for praise and worship. This became the genesis for Jesus music and Christian rock concerts. Maranatha! Music eventually formed to publish and promote the music. The services led by Frisbee usually resembled rock concerts more than any worship services of the time. Frisbee featured in national television-news reports and magazines with images of him baptizing hundreds at a time in the Pacific Ocean. The network of House of Miracles communes/crash pads/coffee houses began doing outreach concerts with Smith or Frisbee preaching, Frisbee calling forth the Holy Spirit and the newly forming bands playing the music. By the early 1970s, Calvary Chapel was home to 10 or more musical groups that were representative of the Jesus people movement.

In 1982, John Wimber, a Calvary Chapel pastor, and the Calvary Chapel leadership mutually agreed to part ways. Tension had been mounting over Wimber's emphasis on spiritual manifestations, leading Wimber to withdraw from Calvary Chapel and to affiliate with a network of churches that would become the Association of Vineyard Churches.

In 2012, Pastor Chuck Smith founded the Calvary Chapel Association (CCA) to unite all of the movement's churches around the world.

On October 3, 2013, Pastor Smith died of lung cancer after a long illness. Smith remained as the senior pastor at Calvary Chapel Costa Mesa throughout his illness; this included preaching at three services on the Sunday before his death.

== Statistics ==
According to a 2022 census of the association, it had 1,800 churches.

== Beliefs ==
Chuck Smith's "Calvary Chapel Distinctives" summarize the tenets for which Calvary Chapel stands. Calvary Chapels place great importance on the practice of expository teaching, a "verse by verse, chapter by chapter, book by book" approach to teaching the Bible. Typically, Calvary Chapels operate under a senior pastor-led system of church government, also known as the "Moses model".

It presents itself as a "fellowship of churches" rather than being a denomination.

Affiliates of Calvary Chapel believe in the doctrines of evangelical Christianity, which include the inerrancy of the Bible and the Trinity. Within evangelical Christianity, they say that they stand in the "middle ground between fundamentalism and Pentecostalism in modern Protestant theology". While they share with a belief in the inerrancy of the Bible, they accept charismatic spiritual gifts. However, they feel that Pentecostalism values experience at the expense of the word of God.

=== Calvinism and Arminianism ===
According to Calvary Chapel literature, the association strives to "strik[e] a balance between extremes" when it comes to controversial theological issues such as Calvinism's and Arminianism's conflicting views on salvation. Calvary Chapels hold the following views on the five points of Calvinism:

1. Regarding total depravity, Calvary Chapel affirms that "apart from God's grace, no one can be saved," and that "mankind is clearly fallen and lost in sin."
2. Regarding unconditional election, Calvary Chapel affirms that God, "based on his foreknowledge, has predestined the believer," and that "God clearly does choose, but man must also accept God's invitation to salvation."
3. Regarding limited atonement, Calvary Chapel affirms that Jesus died "for the whole world" and that the "atoning sacrifice of Jesus Christ was clearly sufficient to save the entire human race."
4. Regarding irresistible grace, Calvary Chapel affirms that "God's grace can either be resisted or received by the exercise of human free will".
5. Calvary Chapels "believe in the perseverance of the saints (true believers) but are deeply concerned about sinful lifestyles and rebellious hearts among those who call themselves 'Christians'."

=== Spiritual gifts ===
Although Calvary Chapel believes in the continuing efficacy of the gift of tongues, it does not recognize uninterpreted tongues spoken in a congregational setting as necessarily inspired (or at least directed) by the Holy Spirit because of its understanding of 1 Corinthians 14. Calvary Chapel accepts that the Bible affirms interpreted tongues and modern prophecy. Practicing tongues in private occurs more commonly. Calvary Chapel does not teach that the outward manifestation of every Christian counts as speaking in tongues.

Similar to other Pentecostal or Charismatic movements, Calvary Chapel holds that the baptism of the Holy Spirit does not take place during conversion, but is available as a second experience. It is their understanding that there are three distinct relationships with the Holy Spirit. The first is that which is experienced prior to conversion. In this relationship the Holy Spirit is convicting the person of their sin. In the second relationship the Holy Spirit indwells believers during conversion for the purpose of sanctification. The third relationship is the baptism of the Holy Spirit which Calvary Chapel believes is for the purpose of being a Christian witness.

=== Baptism and Communion ===
Calvary Chapels practice believer's baptism by immersion. Calvary Chapel does not regard baptism as necessary for salvation, but instead sees it as an outward sign of an inward change. As a result, the Chapels do not baptize infants, although they may dedicate them to God. Calvary Chapel views Communion in a symbolic way, with reference to 1 Corinthians 11:23–26.

=== Eschatology ===
Calvary Chapels strongly espouse pretribulationist and premillennialist views in their eschatology (the study of the end times). They believe that the rapture of the Church will occur first, followed by a literal seven-year period of Great Tribulation, followed by the second coming of Jesus Christ, and then finally a literal thousand-year reign of Jesus Christ on Earth called the Millennial Kingdom. Calvary Chapel also rejects supersessionism, and instead believes that the Jews remain God's chosen people and that Israel will play an important part in the end times.

Interest in one event during the Tribulation—the building of a Third Temple in Jerusalem—led in the early 1980s to associations between some in Calvary Chapel (including Chuck Smith) and Jewish groups interested in seeing the temple rebuilt.

=== Return of Christ in 1981 ===
During the late 1970s and early 1980s, Chuck Smith wrote and published a prophetic timeline that declared the imminent return of Christ.

In the book Snatched Away!, published in 1976, Smith wrote:

the generation that was living in May 1948 shall not pass until the second coming of Jesus Christ takes place and the kingdom of God be established upon the earth.

In a 1978 book, Smith wrote:

I believe that the generation of 1948 is the last generation. Since a generation of judgment is forty years and the Tribulation period lasts seven years, I believe the Lord could come back for His Church any time before the Tribulation starts, which would mean any time before 1981.

The reasoning had to do with the idea that the seven-year Tribulation would end in 1988, 40 years after the establishment of the state of Israel. In his 1978 book, Smith reasoned that Halley's Comet in 1986 would result in problems for those left behind:

The Lord said that towards the end of the Tribulation period the sun would scorch men who dwell upon the face of the Earth (Rev. 16). The year 1986 would fit just about right! We're getting close to the Tribulation and the return of Christ in glory. All the pieces of the puzzle are coming together.

Disappointment resulting from the prophecy not materializing in 1981 caused some to leave the church.

== Practices ==
Calvary Chapel pastors tend to prefer expositional sermons rather than topical ones, and they will often give their sermons sequentially from the Book of Genesis to the Book of Revelation in the Bible. They believe that expository preaching allows the congregation to learn how all parts of the Bible address issues as opposed to topical sermons which they see as allowing preachers to emphasize certain issues more than others. Another advantage, they say, is that it makes difficult topics easier to address because members of the congregation will not feel like they are being singled out. It sees expository teaching as providing consistent teaching that, over time, brings the "perfecting of the saints" which is part of their general philosophy for the Church. In teaching expositorily through scripture sequentially, Calvary Chapel believes God sets the agenda, not the pastor.

Calvary Chapels believe that most churches have a "dependent, highly organized, [and] structured" environment, but that most people want an "independent and casual way of life". Calvary churches typically have a casual and laid-back atmosphere. As a practical implication of this philosophy, people may wear informal clothes to church. Praise and worship usually consists of upbeat contemporary Christian music though many of the churches also sing hymns. The style of worship generally reflects the region and the specific make-up of the congregation.

Calvary Chapel does not have a formalized system of church membership. Calling a Calvary Chapel one's church usually means regularly attending church services and becoming involved in fellowship with other "members" of the church.

== Organization ==
The form of church government practiced by Calvary Chapel does not conform to any of the three historical forms. They do not employ congregational polity, believing that God's people collectively made poor decisions in the Old Testament, citing Exodus 16:2 as an example. They also criticize presbyterian polity because when "the pastor is hired by the board and can be fired by the board," they fear that "the pastor becomes a hireling". Although Calvary Chapel's governance shares a similarity with episcopal polity in that the congregation has no direct authority over the pastor, it does not have the formal hierarchy characteristic of episcopal polity.

The majority of Calvary Chapels have adopted models of government based on their understanding of the theocracy that God established in the Old Testament they sometimes call the "Moses Model". In this system, God was head of his people and under God's authority was Moses, who led the Israelites as God directed him. Moses also had a priesthood and 70 elders providing him support. Calvary Chapel has adapted this order believing their pastors have a role like Moses and their boards of elders function in supporting roles.

Calvary Chapels are independent and self-governing churches. They do not have church membership apart from pastors recognized through their affiliate program. The Calvary Chapel Association has the responsibility of affiliating churches with Calvary Chapel. A church that affiliates with Calvary Chapel often (but not always) uses the name "Calvary Chapel". Three requirements for becoming affiliated exist:

1. the pastor must "embrace the characteristics of the Calvary Chapel movement as described in Calvary Chapel Distinctives"
2. the church must have the characteristics of a church (as opposed to a less-developed home fellowship)
3. an applicant must express willingness to spend the time to fellowship with other Calvary Chapels

The requirements do not include a seminary degree. In accordance with Calvary's interpretation and understanding of the Bible (see 1 Timothy 3:2 and 1 Timothy 3:12), Calvary Chapel does not ordain women or sexually-active homosexuals as pastors.

Regional lead pastors exercise a measure of accountability. Since no legal or financial ties link the different Calvary Chapels, only disaffiliation can serve as a disciplinary procedure.

The Calvary Chapel trademark is owned by Calvary Chapel Costa Mesa, the flagship church of the Calvary Chapel Global Network. The Calvary dove logo is also a "trademark-protected property of Calvary Chapel of Costa Mesa."

== Controversies ==
Various criticisms of the organization and of the pastorate role in the organization exist. For example, Chuck Smith has been criticized for drawing connections between disasters (e.g., earthquakes, the September 11 attacks) and divine wrath against homosexuality and abortion.

Calvary Chapel leaders, including Smith, were the subject of a lawsuit alleging that they knew or should have known that a minister named Anthony Iglesias was prone to sexual abuse when they moved him from ministry positions in Diamond Bar, California, to Thailand, to Post Falls, Idaho. Iglesias was convicted of molesting two 14-year-old boys in California in 2004, and the lawsuit stemmed from events in Idaho, but all alleged abuse occurred in or before 2003. The church was dismissed as a defendant in the lawsuit.

As a result of what he saw as micromanaging church elders and board members, Chuck Smith used "an independent board of elders" when he took the senior pastor role at Calvary Chapel. According to Christianity Today, Smith's book Calvary Chapel Distinctions taught that senior pastors should be answerable to God, not to a denominational hierarchy or board of elders, by analogy with the authority structure that God used when Israel was under the rule of Moses. Critics claim that Smith's "Moses Model", in which senior pastors do not permit their authority to be challenged, can lead to churches that are often resistant to accountability. Calvary Chapel suggests that some churches are led astray by the management of their boards and that a biblical board of elders should aid the ministry and give wise counsel, not control the affairs of the church.

In November 2016, Calvary Chapel Costa Mesa left the Calvary Chapel Association and formed the Calvary Chapel Global Network. The latter continues to count the association's 1000 churches as members unless they opt out.

== Ministries ==
=== Bible college ===
Calvary Chapel Bible College (CCBC) was founded as a ministry of Calvary Chapel Costa Mesa in 1975. CCBC is now an independent institution serving Calvary Chapel at large from their current location in Bradenton, Florida. It originally offered a "short, intensive study program", but became a college offering Associate of Biblical Studies degrees (for high-school graduates), and Bachelor of Biblical Studies degrees (to students who have an Associate of Arts from an approved college). The college as a whole is pursuing accreditation; and students can transfer CCBC credits some major accredited colleges such as Azusa Pacific, Biola University, Liberty University, Veritas International University, etc. The college was initially reluctant on seeking accreditation, stating that this allows Calvary Chapel Bible College to keep tuition costs lower and offer courses taught by instructors without master's degrees. But C.C.B.C. has reversed course and is currently seeking accreditation.

=== Harvest Crusades ===
Harvest Crusades operate as a ministry of Harvest Christian Fellowship (a former Calvary Chapel in Riverside, California). They carry out an evangelistic ministry similar to Billy Graham's. They meet in stadiums and have Christian music bands play followed by an evangelical message normally given by Greg Laurie. They estimate three million people have attended since its inception in 1990.

=== Broadcasting ===
Calvary Chapel churches operate several radio stations, including:

- KBLD in Kennewick, Washington
- KKJC in McMinnville, Oregon
- KLYT in Albuquerque, New Mexico
- KQIP-LP in Chico, California
- KWTH 91.3 in Barstow, California
- KWTW in Bishop, California (with its partner KWTD)
- KWVE-FM in Costa Mesa, California (near Los Angeles)
- KXGR FM 89.7 in Loveland, Colorado
- WAYG-LP 104.7 FM in Miami, Florida
- WJCX in Pittsfield, Maine
- WLGS-LP in Lake Villa, Illinois
- WLMP-LP in Fredericksburg, Virginia
- WRDR in Freehold Township, New Jersey (near New York City)
- WTWT/WYVL in Russell, Pennsylvania (in the Twin Tiers of Pennsylvania and New York)
- WXMB-LP 101.5 FM in Myrtle Beach, South Carolina
- WZXV in Farmington, New York
- KSGR 91.1 Corpus Christi, Texas

In addition, a Calvary Chapel in Twin Falls, Idaho, founded the CSN International (originally known as the "Calvary Satellite Network") and Effect Radio networks; though CSN still carries a significant number of programs from several Calvary Chapels, the networks and the church (subsequently known by the name "The River Christian Fellowship") severed their official ties with the Calvary Chapel as part of a 2007 legal settlement. In 2010, Calvary Chapel Costa Mesa sold 11 stations and 20 translators in the midwestern United States to the Calvary Radio Network.

== Notable people ==
=== Pastors ===
- Chuck Smith (1927-2013), founder of the Calvary Chapel movement in the 1960s; senior pastor of Calvary Chapel Costa Mesa in Santa Ana, California, until his death.
- Bob Coy, founder of Calvary Chapel Fort Lauderdale. Resigned in 2014 over an adultery scandal.
- Lonnie Frisbee (1949-1993), hippie evangelist in the 1960s, the key figure of the Jesus Movement: "The first Jesus freak." Pastor in Calvary Chapel until 1971.
- Skip Heitzig, senior pastor of Calvary of Albuquerque as of 1982
- Greg Laurie, senior pastor, since 1979, of Harvest Christian Fellowship in Riverside.
- Mike MacIntosh, pastor as of 2009 of Horizon Christian Fellowship in San Diego.
- Chuck Missler (1934-2018), author and teacher.

=== Musicians ===
- Dennis Agajanian, alumnus of the "Guinness Book of World Records" as the fastest flat-picker
- Alejandro Alonso, contemporary Christian-Latin artist
- Jeremy Camp, contemporary Christian artist
- Paul Clark, contemporary Christian artist
- Daniel Amos, Christian rock and alternative rock band
- Phil Danyew, contemporary Christian artist and touring member of Foster the People
- Richie Furay, folk rock artist
- Chuck Girard, folk rock artist
- Love Song, Jesus music band
- Mustard Seed Faith, folk rock band
- P.O.D., alternative rock band
- Tony Stone, Christian hip-hop producer
- Switchfoot, alternative rock band
- Brian "Head" Welch, alternative Christian artist
- Phil Wickham, contemporary Christian artist
- Kelly Willard, contemporary Christian artist
- Michael Bloodgood, Christian metal artist

=== Other members ===
- Linda Gist Calvin, 41st President General of the Daughters of the American Revolution

== See also ==
- Born again
- Believers' Church
