= Daniel Singh =

American politician

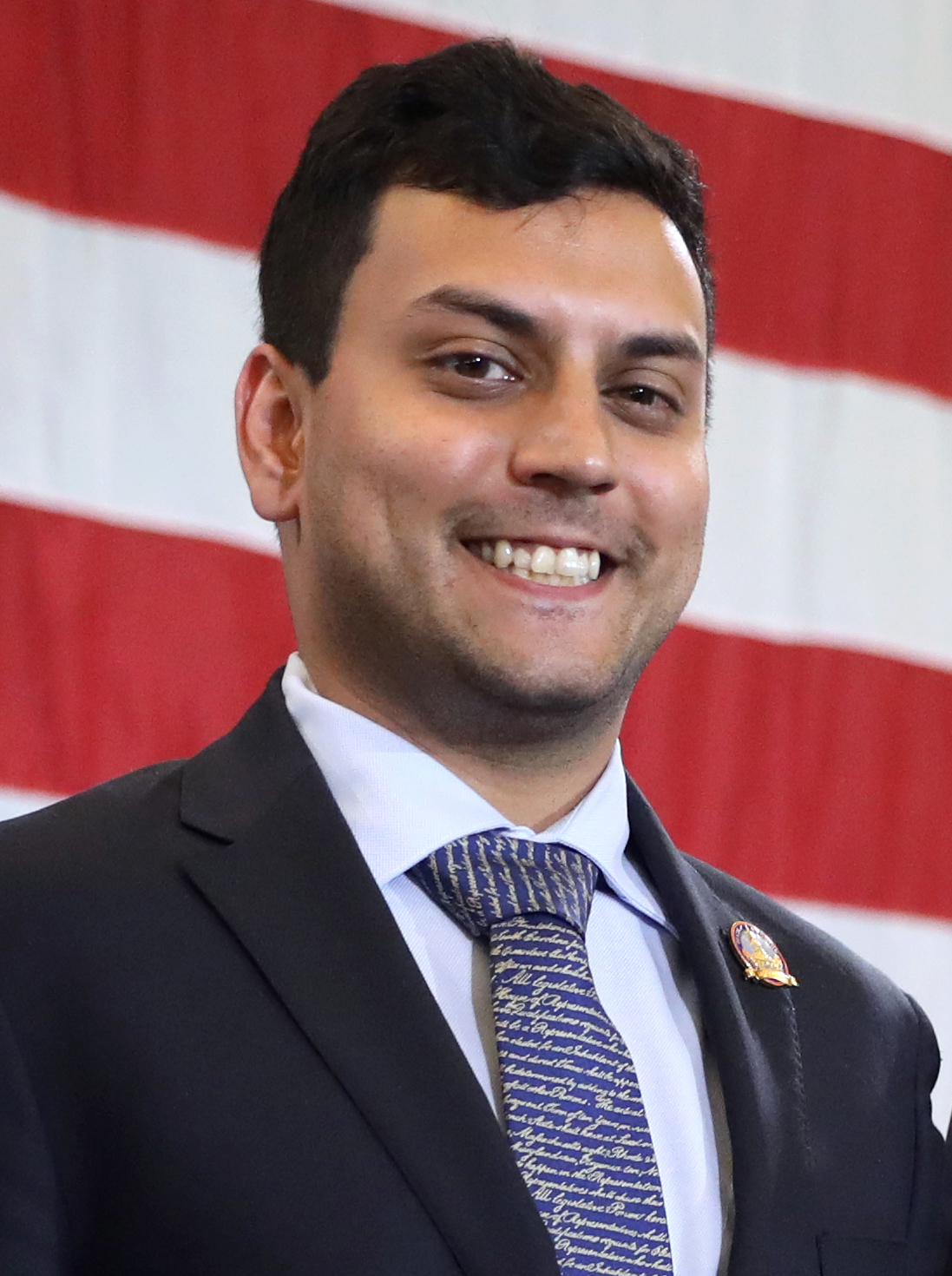

Member of the Wyoming House of Representatives from the 61st district
- Incumbent
- Assumed office January 2, 2023
- Preceded by: Constituency established
- Succeeded by: Andrew Server (elect)

Personal details
- Born: Daniel J. Singh; 1997 (age 28–29) Torrington, Wyoming, U.S.
- Party: Republican
- Education: Calvary Chapel Bible College (AA)

Daniel J. Singh (born 1997) is an American politician serving as a member of the Wyoming House of Representatives in the 61st district. Elected in November 2022 for the first time, he assumed office on January 2, 2023.

== Early life and education ==
Singh was born in Torrington, Wyoming, and raised in LaGrange. His parents were Evangelical missionaries who emigrated to the United States from Trinidad and Tobago. Singh graduated from Cheyenne East High School in 2015 and earned an associate degree from the Calvary Chapel Bible College in 2020.

== Career ==
Singh was a member of the One Way Evangelistic Ministries. Outside of politics, he worked as a shift leader at Starbucks and numerous customer service & restaurant leadership careers. He was elected to the Wyoming House of Representatives in November 2022 and assumed office in January 2023.
