= WZXV =

- Palmyra, New York; United States
- Broadcast area: Rochester area
- Frequency: 99.7 MHz

Programming
- Format: Christian radio

Ownership
- Owner: Calvary Chapel of the Finger Lakes

Technical information
- Licensing authority: FCC
- Facility ID: 51353
- Class: A
- ERP: 2,800 watts
- HAAT: 148 meters (486 ft)
- Transmitter coordinates: 43°02′00″N 77°25′17″W
- Translator: See § Translators

Links
- Public license information: Public file; LMS
- Webcast: Listen live
- Website: wzxv.org

WZXV (99.7 FM) is a radio station broadcasting a Christian radio format. Licensed to Palmyra, New York, United States, the station serves the Rochester area and, through a network of translators, most of central New York and the Genesee Valley. The network previously had translators in Western New York but sold the two translators there in 2025, as other Calvary Chapels have a radio presence there. The station is currently owned by Calvary Chapel of the Finger Lakes, Inc.

The station operates as a noncommercial religious station; the main frequency and all of its translators are nonetheless in the commercial FM band, above 92 MHz. The translators operate on an unusual "daisy chain" configuration where distant translators receive the signal from another, closer translator instead of directly from WZXV, allowing the network to cover a broader area.

== Translators ==
Broadcast translators of WZXV
Call sign	Frequency (MHz)	City of license	Facility ID
W297BK	107.3	Attica, New York	151657
W266BE	101.1	Auburn, New York	138601
W275BL	102.9	Batavia, New York	150833
W248AT	97.5	Corfu, New York	150935
W293CU	106.5	Cortland, New York	151672
W248BC	97.5	Dansville, New York	86505
W272DY	102.3	East Ithaca, New York	151608
W281AT	104.1	Ithaca, New York	151635
W278AH	103.5	Syracuse, New York	81126
