= KQIP-LP =

Low-power radio station in Chico, California

- Chico, California; United States
- Frequency: 107.1 MHz

Programming
- Format: Religious

Ownership
- Owner: Calvary Chapel of Chico

Technical information
- Licensing authority: FCC
- Facility ID: 124250
- Class: L1
- ERP: 100 watts
- HAAT: −19.6 meters (−64 ft)
- Transmitter coordinates: 39°43′46.00″N 121°48′25.00″W

Links
- Public license information: LMS
- Webcast: Listen live
- Website: ccchico.com/media/kqip-107-1-fm

KQIP-LP (107.1 FM) is a low-power FM radio station licensed to Chico, California, United States, serving the Chico area. The station is currently owned by Calvary Chapel of Chico.
