= Freakstock =

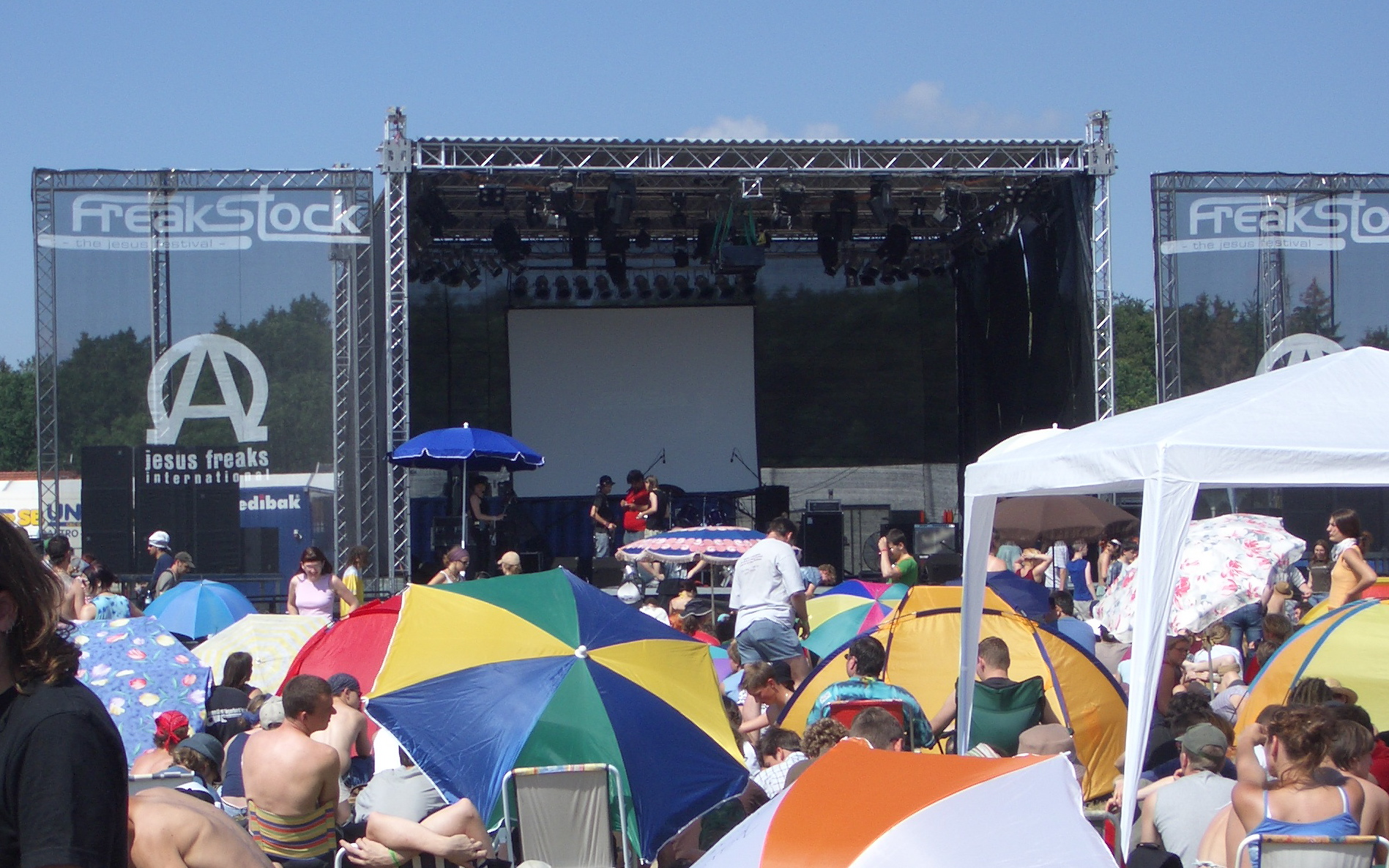
Freakstock main stage in 2004

Freakstock is an annual Christian festival held by members of the German Jesus Freaks movement. First held in Wiesbaden in 1995, the festival was moved to Gotha in 1997. Over 8000 people attend annually. The festival presents many varieties of Christian music and includes teaching and praise and worship sessions.
