= Twin Peaks, California =

Unincorporated community in California, United States

- Unincorporated community
- Location within California Location within the United States
- Coordinates: 34°14′20″N 117°14′01″W
- Country: United States
- State: California
- County: San Bernardino
- Elevation: 5,777 ft (1,761 m)
- Time zone: UTC-8 (Pacific (PST))
  - Summer (DST): UTC-7 (PDT)
- ZIP code: 92391
- Area code: 909
- GNIS feature ID: 1661596

Twin Peaks is an unincorporated community in San Bernardino County, California, United States, within the heart of the San Bernardino Mountains. California State Route 189 runs through the entire area before it reaches Lake Arrowhead. Twin Peaks has a post office with ZIP code 92391, which opened in 1916.

== History ==
Originally settled in the 1860s, the first settlers included many strawberry farmers. The area would first be known as Strawberry Flat. Some of the first buildings to be constructed in the town include the now gone Squirrel Inn, the still-standing Antlers Inn, and the also still-standing Pine Rose Cabins. The Antlers Inn originated in 1919 when some 20 cabins were simultaneously constructed around a central lodge known then as the Alpine Terrace Resort.

== Calvary Chapel Bible College ==
In 1975, Calvary Chapel Bible College purchased and renovated the Monte Corona resort, repurposing it as a Biblical college and Conference Center. In 1994, C.C.B.C. would relocate to Murrieta, California and the former site became repurposed as a Christian Conference Center along with meeting place for Calvery Chapel - Twin Peaks. C.C.B.C. returned to Twin Peaks in July 2022 after nearly 30 years and began massive renovations & projects on all campus buildings. The Bible College underwent major construction & renovations; and involved in creating more employment & investment for the community.

== Church of Spiritual Technology ==
The Church of Scientology's Church of Spiritual Technology has been located in Twin Peaks since 1982.

== Notable residents ==
- Tim Donnelly - former California State Assemblyman and local businessman

== Climate ==
According to the Köppen Climate Classification system, Twin Peaks has a warm-summer Mediterranean climate.
