= Shiloh Youth Revival Centers =

American christian movement

The Shiloh Youth Revival Centers movement was the largest Jesus People communal movement in the United States in the 1970s. Founded in 1968 as a small communal house (House of Miracles) by Lonnie Frisbee and John Higgins, a former drug addict who had converted to fundamentalist Christianity by reading the Bible, in Costa Mesa, California, the movement quickly grew to a very large movement catering mostly to disaffected college-age youth. There were over 100,000 people involved and 175 communal houses established during its lifespan.

The notion of "being part of Shiloh" was not well-defined. Shiloh did not have official membership. The most generous definition of being "involved in Shiloh"...in addition to the Staff (offices, print shop, and staff, etc.) and the Teams (who were schooled and sent out to chosen cities to open a Shiloh House) would also include all the individuals who spent the night or days as guests. Shiloh houses operated like hippie-style rescue missions, in the sense that people who needed a place to stay for a couple nights were welcomed. But the guests were not documented; no identification was asked for; their names were not written down. Consequently, it is unclear how the claim of a hundred thousand people "involved in Shiloh" could be defended.

Two years after the movement's founding, Higgins and some of the core members of the movement bought 90 acres (360,000 m^{2}) of land near Dexter, Oregon, and built a new headquarters which they called "The Land". The movement grew quickly until the mid-1970s as growth in the Houses began to slow down. When Shiloh board members dismissed Higgins in 1978 for his authoritarian leadership style, the organization experienced severe upheaval. Higgins then became a pastor with the Calvary Chapel, leaving a few remnant groups to struggle on. By 1986 none were left. Following a series of court cases relating to taxation, the organization formally disbanded in 1988.

Several individuals remained on the Oregon property as caretakers, but an eventual legal battle with the IRS over the charitable status of incomes earned by members during the movement's existence ultimately led to the complete dissolution and liquidation of the movement and its assets in 1989.

While membership in the movement was voluntary, it was also communal and required substantial commitment. To join the movement, members were expected to make a commitment to Jesus Christ and, in return, their needs would be provided for: food, clothing, shelter, and medical care. All members worked together for the support of the ministry, so all wages went into the common fund and were distributed throughout the Houses as needs were addressed.

== How Shiloh Expanded ==
The Teams mentioned above would rent a house in the city they were sent to. Their primary mission was evangelism, focusing particularly on the youth. The Team members would find jobs (mostly unskilled labor) and spend as much time as they could witnessing to their faith, usually by passing out evangelistic tracts and starting conversations with people. Favorite locations were college campuses, bus stations or other places where the youth gathered. Some of the people who responded favorably to the witnessing would visit the Shiloh House for further conversations about the Christian faith. Some of them decided to become Christians and some of them decided to move into the Shiloh House.
