= Mike MacIntosh =

American pastor

Mike MacIntosh (born 1944) is the senior pastor of Horizon Christian Fellowship in San Diego, California, and is a Protestant leader in the United States.

== Ministry ==
MacIntosh became involved with Calvary Chapel after his conversion to Christianity under the ministry of evangelist Lonnie Frisbee. He then went on to pastor Horizon Christian Fellowship, a Calvary Chapel affiliate, beginning in 1974.

HCF has a 22-acre campus in San Diego, which includes Horizon Christian Academy (Preschool to 12th grade) and Horizon University.

He is also the organizer of Festival of Life, an international evangelical outreach program.

== Family ==
Mike and Sandy MacIntosh married in 1973. They have six children, 20 grandchildren, and 5 great-grandchildren.

== Books ==
- Falling in Love With the Bible
- Falling in Love With Prayer
- When Your World Falls Apart
- The Tender Touch of God
- Living in the Days of Revelation
- Finding God
- For the Love of Mike (biography by Sherwood Eliot Wirt)
