= House of Miracles (communal house) =

Series of Christian communal houses in the US

The House of Miracles was a series of Christian communal houses established during the early Jesus Movement under the auspices of Pastor Chuck Smith and Calvary Chapel in Costa Mesa, California. The House of Miracles was the group from which sprang the largest (and one of the longest lasting) of the Jesus People communal groups, the Shiloh Youth Revival Centers, which had 100,000 members and 175 communal houses spread across the United States and Canada during its lifespan.

On May 17, 1968, John Higgins, Sr. and Lonnie Frisbee opened the first House of Miracles in Costa Mesa on 19th St. There were twenty houses eventually involved as Houses of Miracles throughout California: one each in Costa Mesa, Huntington Beach (Philadelphia House), Corona, Downey, Lompoc, Garlock, Long Beach, Muscoy, Oxnard, Pacific Grove, Ridgecrest, Southgate and Whittier; two houses apiece in Fontana, Riverside and Santa Ana; and one in Phoenix, Arizona. All gradually closed throughout 1969 and 1970 as members moved to Oregon to form Shiloh Youth Revival Centers: the last House of Miracles (in Oxnard) closed in July 1970.
