= Alejandro Alonso (musician) =

Mexican singer and guitarist (1952–2022)

- Born: 14 August 1952; Querétaro, Mexico
- Died: 31 January 2022 (aged 69)
- Occupations: Musician; singer; songwriter
- Instruments: Guitar; vocals
- Years active: 1973–2007
- Website: alejandroalonso.com

Alejandro Alonso (14 August 1952 – 31 January 2022) was a Mexican guitar player, singer, and composer. He released 9 albums of Christian music. He also worked as a pastor and evangelist, especially in the Hispanic community.

== Life and career ==
=== Early years ===
Alonso was born on August 14, 1952, in his grandfather's house in Querétaro, Mexico. He began his musical career at a very early age. During his teen years he was the lead guitarist in a number of bands playing in pubs and popular Mexican nightclubs. He was greatly influenced by B.B. King, Eric Clapton, Larry Carlton, Santana and others. He quickly learned to play the bass, drums, and some piano as well.

=== Conversion to Evangelicalism ===
In 1971 Alonso had a born again experience and committed his life to Jesus Christ. Immediately, he began composing his own material and developing his vocal skills. In 1972, he married artist and flautist, Pamela Alonso. They had three children, Alicia, Job and Rebekah.

From 1973 to 1980, he dedicated much of his time to using his music as an evangelistic tool performing at colleges, universities, open-air concerts, and prisons.

=== Maranatha! Years ===
In 1980 he moved to California and began working with Calvary Chapel and Maranatha! Music. With Maranatha! he made his first recordings and became one of the innovators of Spanish Christian Contemporary music.

He toured extensively in Latin America and took his music to war zones and areas of guerrilla activity. He also dedicated much time to Bible study and began pastoring Hispanic groups in different churches.

=== Relocation to South America ===
In 1986 he moved with his family to Chile to do missionary work; he later returned to California and continued working on a variety of musical projects and pastoring churches.

In 1995 Alonso moved with his family to Buenos Aires, Argentina as a missionary. After a year they relocated to Santiago, Chile. He founded a church there and continued working for seven years. He traveled extensively during that time performing all over the world.

=== Later life and death ===
In 2001 he returned to California where he lived until his death. He was the pastor of Iglesia Maranatha Chapel, San Marcos, California. He died on 31 January 2022, at the age of 69.

== Albums ==
Alonso recorded nine solo albums; seven in the Spanish language, one in English and one instrumental. He won awards and was recognized as one of the most influential Spanish Christian contemporary musicians.

=== Cántico de Libertad – Song of Freedom (1982) ===
This was Alonso's first solo music production and was recorded in 1982. It is considered a classic and initiated a fresh style in Spanish Christian contemporary music. It has inspired many Christian singers and musicians who are internationally renowned today. It was produced by Kenneth Nash and includes the talents of Andy Narrel, Ray Oviedo, Paul Contos, and Paul Van Wageningen.

=== Alguien – Someone (1992) ===
Alonso considered the production to be his master work. It was produced by Alonso and includes contributions from Abraham Laboriel, Alex Acuña, Justo Almario, John Schriener, Bob Somma and Alfy Silas.

=== Tu Santidad Me Envuelve – Your Holiness Surrounds Me (1994) ===
This album is more on the acoustic side with a touch of gospel-blues. It has become one of Alonso's most popular albums. It was produced by Alonso; L.G. Burger, Gary Metz, Julie Worthey, Patty Hamilton, Pamela Alonso, his wife; and Pat Berrón appeared on the album.

=== Todo Lo Que Respira – Let all that Hath Breath... (1997) ===
This album of praise and worship songs is primarily directed toward younger people. It also includes some traditional hymns. The rhythms vary between blues-gospel, ballad and interesting Latin rhythms. It was produced by Alonso and has the participation of Pamela Alonso, Adreas Redel, Marianela Abate, Jenny Brito, and Zuzuki Delpero.

=== Heme Aquí – Here am I (1999) ===
Contains two songs by singer-songwriter Dave Messenger. It was produced by Alonso and includes the participation of Pamela Alonso, Sebastián Almarza, Marianela Abate, Jenny Brito, and Viviana Martinez.

=== De Regreso a Casa – Coming Home (2001) ===
All of the songs on this album are his own compositions with the exception of the last song which is an old hymn (Solid Rock). Alonso and Pamela Alonso produced this project together.

=== Joyful Noise (2002) ===
Alonso's first instrumental album. It combines a blend of Latin and South American rhythms with a touch of contemporary jazz.

=== Scars of Love (2007) ===
Alonso's last production. It was released in both English and Spanish versions. This album includes the musical talents of Pamela Alonso, Jonathan Amabilis and Josué Puga.

=== Other projects ===
Alonso was also featured as part of the vocalists performing in the Spanish version of Maranatha's Praise Series Quiero Alabarte. The same ensemble recorded a Spanish album (Te Alabaré) as Voces de Calvary Chapel.
