= Skip Heitzig =

American pastor

Skip Heitzig (born 1955) is the founder and senior pastor of Calvary Church, a Calvary Chapel fellowship located in Albuquerque, New Mexico.

== Personal ==
A native of Southern California, Heitzig has three siblings (his brother, Bob, died in a motorcycle accident in 1975 and his brother, James, died in 2019).

He has been described as a former "marijuana smoking surfer dude." Heitzig was witnessed to by a friend, Gino Geraci, senior pastor of Calvary South Denver. Skip's conversion came while watching a Billy Graham crusade on TV and giving his life to Jesus. Shortly after this experience, Heitzig began to study under Pastor Chuck Smith of Calvary Chapel of Costa Mesa.

In 1981, Heitzig married his wife, Lenya, and together they moved to Albuquerque, New Mexico, to continue his work in the medical field. Together, they have one son, Nathan.

== Ministry ==
In 1982, Heitzig began a home Bible study that eventually grew into Calvary of Albuquerque. In 1988 and 1989, Calvary of Albuquerque was listed as one of the fastest-growing churches in America. In 2009, Calvary of Albuquerque was listed as one of the 15 largest churches in America, with an average weekend attendance of 13,000. In November 2018, CBS News listed Calvary Chapel of Albuquerque as the 22nd largest megachurch in the United States with about 16,830 weekly visitors and more than 13,000 followers on Facebook.

After a brief pastorate in San Juan Capistrano (Ocean Hills, 2004-2006), Heitzig returned to Calvary of Albuquerque as senior pastor in 2006, following the resignation of the previous pastor, Pete Nelson.

Heitzig serves on several boards of directors, including that of Samaritan's Purse. He also serves as Associate Professor of Pastoral and Biblical Studies at Veritas International University.

== Education ==
Heitzig attended Victor Valley Community College in California and UCLA.

Heitzig earned a Ph.D. from Trinity Southwest University in New Mexico and an M.A. and B.A. from Trinity Seminary, Newburgh, Indiana.

== Publishing and media ==
Heitzig is the author of several books and booklets, including:

- How To Study the Bible and Enjoy It (Tyndale House, 1996)
- Jesus Up Close (Tyndale House, 2001)
- When God Prays (Tyndale House, 2003).
- Encounter: Face 2 Face with Jesus (Bridge-Logos, 2009).
- God Print (Bridge-Logos, 2009).
- The Daily God Book (Tyndale House, 2010).
- Homeland Security (Bridge-Logos, 2010).
- You Can Understand the Book of Revelation (Harvest House Publishers, 2011)
- Defying Normal (Worthy Books, 2015).
- The Bible from 30,000 Feet (Harvest House Publishers, 2017).
- You Can Understand™ the Book of Genesis: Experience Its Meaning and Message (Harvest House Publishers, 2018).
- Bloodline: Tracing God's Rescue Plan from Eden to Eternity (Harvest House Publishers, 2019).
- Soaring Through the Bible: A Travel Guide from Genesis to Revelation for Kids (Harvest House Publishers, 2019).
- You Can Understand the Book of Revelation: Exploring Its Mystery and Message (Harvest Prophecy, 2020).
- Biography of God (Harvest House Publishers, 2020).

Heitzig can be heard throughout the United States and worldwide on his radio broadcast, The Connection, as well as various cable and internet-based television channels (His Channel, KNET). His teachings are available on the Calvary Church with Skip Heitzig YouTube channel. The Connect with Skip Heitzig podcast is featured on OnePlace.com and Pray.com. Heitzig has also produced devotional plans on YouVersion, including the 30K 30 Day Challenge, an overview of the New Testament.

== Music ==
As a musician, songwriter, and producer, Heitzig has been featured on several musical projects, including:

- Lively Hearts (1999)
- Everywhere I Go (2000)

Heitzig wrote the lyrics to the modern hymn (with Brian Nixon) "Gloria Exaltus" (2008), which was released on the album Stars Shine Bright.

== TV and documentaries ==
Heitzig hosted the video documentary Epicenter (Tyndale 2007), with author Joel C. Rosenberg, as well as the documentary The Jesus Boat (2009). In 2010, Heitzig released two additional documentaries, Shattered and Riptide. Heitzig has also been a featured guest on several documentaries and video teachings, including A Venture in Faith.

== See also ==
- Chuck Smith
