= Gentle Faith =

Christian country rock band

Gentle Faith was a Christian country rock band in the 1970s, during the Jesus music era. An early version of the group released a song on The Everlastin' Living Jesus Music Concert in 1971 and one self-titled album in 1976 on the Maranatha! label.

The band was led by bassist-vocalist-songwriter Henry Cutrona. Singer-harmonica player Darrell Mansfield later fronted the band and went on to have an active solo career. Other members of Gentle Faith included Don Gerber (acoustic guitar, banjo mandolin, vocals), Paul Angers (drums, percussion), and Steve Kara (electric guitar, bass, mandolin, vocals).

The band was originally called Jubal, but switched in 1975 because another Calvary Chapel band had a similar name, Jubal's Last Band. Jubal became Gentle Faith (taken from the name of Cutrona's earlier band), and Jubal's Last Band became Daniel Amos.
