= Wyoming's 61st House of Representatives district =

American legislative district

Wyoming's 61st State House of Representatives district
- Wyoming's 61st House of Representatives district as of 2022
Representative
Daniel Singh; R–Cheyenne
- Demographics: 80% White; 1% Black; 16% Hispanic; 3% Multiracial
- Population (2022): 8,616

Wyoming's 61st House of Representatives district is one of 62 districts in the Wyoming House of Representatives. The district encompasses part of Laramie County. It is represented by Republican Representative Daniel Singh of Cheyenne.

During the 2020 redistricting cycle, the Wyoming Legislature passed a bill in 2022 solidifying the new legislative district boundaries in the state. These changed districts included adding two new seats, the 61st district and the 62nd district, to the state house, which previously had only 60 seats.

== List of members representing the district ==
Representative	Party	Term	Note
Daniel Singh	Republican	2023 – present	Elected in 2022. Re-elected in 2024.

== Election results ==
=== 2022 ===
House district 61 general election
Party	Candidate	Votes	%
Republican	Daniel Singh	1,561	95.76%
Write-ins		69	4.23%
Total votes		1,630	100.0%
Invalid or blank votes		342	

=== 2024 ===
House district 61 general election
Party	Candidate	Votes	%
Republican	Daniel Singh (incumbent)	2,516	93.74%
Write-ins		168	6.25%
Total votes		2,684	100.0%
Invalid or blank votes		368	
Republican hold			
