= Chuck Smith (pastor) =

American pastor

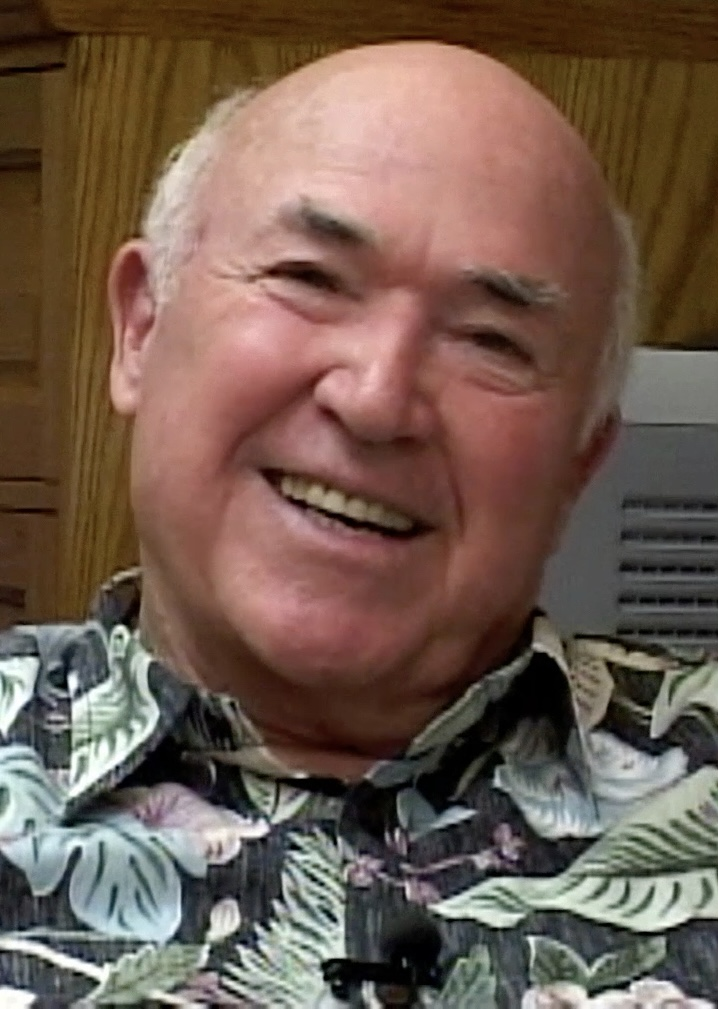
- Born: Charles Ward Smith; June 25, 1927; Ventura, California, U.S.
- Died: October 3, 2013 (aged 86); Newport Beach, California, U.S.
- Education: Life Pacific College
- Alma mater: Life Pacific College, 1946
- Occupation: Pastor
- Years active: 1965–2013
- Known for: Pastor and founder of Calvary Chapel
- Notable work: Love, The More Excellent Way
- Television: A Venture In Faith (Documentary) What God Hath Wrought (Documentary)
- Spouse: Kay Johnson (m. 1947)
- Children: 4

Charles Ward Smith (June 25, 1927 – October 3, 2013) was an American pastor who founded the Calvary Chapel movement. Beginning with the 25-person Costa Mesa congregation in 1965, Smith's influence now extends to "more than 1,000 churches nationwide and hundreds more overseas", some of which are among the largest churches in the United States. He has been called "one of the most influential figures in modern American Christianity." The founding of Calvary Chapel is depicted in the 2023 film Jesus Revolution, with Smith being portrayed by Kelsey Grammer.

== Early life and career ==
Charles Ward Smith was born on June 25, 1927, in Ventura, California, to Charles and Maude Smith. He was the second of four children.

After graduating from Santa Ana High School in 1945, Smith graduated from Life Bible College and was ordained as a pastor for the International Church of the Foursquare Gospel. In the late 1950s, Smith was the campaign manager and worship director for healing evangelist Paul Cain. After being a pastor for a different denomination, he left his denomination to pastor a non-denominational church plant in Corona, California, and eventually moved to a small pre-existing church called Calvary Chapel in Costa Mesa, California in December 1965.

== Calvary Chapel ==
In March 1968, Smith brought into his home the then-18-year-old pentecostal evangelist Lonnie Frisbee with his wife Connie. Smith paired him with John Higgins who already had a Bible study going for youth; they started a Christian commune called "The House of Miracles". Higgins and Frisbee went into the community to reach youth with the gospel during the early days of the Jesus movement.

The Costa Mesa church, led by Smith, grew and as of 2006, was attended by 35,000 people and had spawned over 1,000 churches that have branched out as part of the Calvary Chapel Association. Smith has been called "one of the most influential Christian pastors in Southern California" who "is known for training other prominent ministers." Notable ministers who have been mentored by Smith include Skip Heitzig, Mike MacIntosh, and Greg Laurie. Smith also launched the radio program, The Word for Today. At its beginning, Calvary Chapel operated as a cross-cultural missions organization that bridged the "generation gap" as it existed during the Vietnam War period. Calvary Chapel was a hub of the "Jesus People" phenomenon that existed at that time and was featured in Time magazine for its success among "hippies" and young people. Calvary Chapel pioneered a contemporary and less formal approach in its worship and public meetings; for example, it did outreaches on the beach, and baptisms in the Pacific Ocean. Much of contemporary Christian music has its roots in Calvary Chapel worship music. Calvary Chapel's rolling commentary-style of preaching kept the Calvary Chapels close to the text of the Bible and was readily understandable by many hearers. Calvary Chapel developed its own internal training early for multiplication of church leaders and pastors; by pioneering a more informal and contemporary style in its church practices, Calvary Chapel reached large numbers in Costa Mesa and expanded easily by adding many pastors and new congregations in many locations. The impact of Chuck Smith and Calvary Chapel on evangelical Christianity is profound, widespread, and largely unheralded. Rather than being a teacher of systems and methods of growing large churches (elements of which frustrated him in his denominational experience), Chuck Smith taught his personal brand of leadership at pastors' conferences which included one single male leader, who held the majority of the power, with a group of elders who served primarily as figure heads to reinforce pastoral authority.

A self-made documentary, What God Hath Wrought, produced by Screen Savers Entertainment in collaboration with Smith, tells the story of Smith's life, the Calvary Chapel movement and its influence on modern-day Christianity. In the film A Conversation with Chuck Smith (2013) Chuck Smith talks about his battle with lung cancer and other personal topics.

Chuck Smith is the author and co-author of several books; titles of his books include Answers for Today; Calvary Chapel Distinctives; Calvinism, Arminianism & The Word of God; Charisma vs. Charismania; Comfort for Those Who Mourn; Effective Prayer Life; Harvest; Living Water; The Claims of Christ; The Gospel According to Grace; The Philosophy of Ministry of Calvary Chapel; Why Grace Changes Everything; Love: The More Excellent Way; The Final Act; and others.

== Controversy ==
In his 1978 book End Times, Smith was incorrectly convinced the generation of 1948 would be the last generation, and that the world would end by 1981 at the latest. Smith supported his convictions again in his 1980 manuscript "Future Survival", postulating that from his "understanding of biblical prophecies… [I am] convinced that the Lord [will come] for His Church before the end of 1981." He identified that he "could be wrong" but continued in the same sentence that "it's a deep conviction in my heart, and all my plans are predicated upon that belief." Calvary Chapel held a New Year's Eve service in 1981 for their followers to wait for the end to occur in accordance with Smith's prediction. When the world failed to end, disillusioned followers left the Calvary Chapel movement. Gershom Gorenberg comments that Smith said nothing about the failed prediction at the time, leaving "his flock to wonder", and that when asked about the prediction in years afterwards, "he shrug[ged] it off as a mere possibility he raised". Smith later stated that setting dates for the end of the world was wrong and he "came close" to doing that, which journalist Gustavo Arellano described as a "wimpy non-apology" for his failed prediction.

Smith attracted criticism for drawing connections between disasters such as the September 11 attacks and divine wrath against homosexuality and abortion.

Smith has also been criticized publicly with allegations that he has tolerated financial and sexual improprieties within the Calvary Chapel movement.

In 2006, Smith was instrumental in removing his son, Chuck Smith Jr., from ministry in the Calvary Chapel movement. The Los Angeles Times reported that Smith Jr. was dismissed when he raised questions about his father's theological beliefs and philosophy of ministry.

== Honors ==
In April 2012, Smith received the Men of Character Award from the Orange County Council of the Boy Scouts of America.

== Personal life ==
On June 19, 1947, Smith married Kay Johnson. She served as director of the women's ministry at Calvary Chapel Costa Mesa for many years. They had four children together.

On December 27, 2009, Smith suffered a minor stroke in his home and was immediately hospitalized. He recovered and returned to the ministry.

Smith announced during the New Years Day 2012 service that he had lung cancer. In June 2013, Smith's doctors found that his lung cancer had advanced from stage three to stage four.

== Death ==
Smith died from lung cancer on October 3, 2013, at his home in Newport Beach, California, at the age of 86. He was interred at Fairhaven Memorial Park in Santa Ana, California. After he was buried, his funeral was held at the Honda Center in Anaheim, California, where more than 200 churches worldwide planned to show his tribute, live via webcast.
