= Duane Pederson =

American Christian leader (1938–2022)

Father Duane Pederson, The Right Reverend Archimandrite (September 30, 1938 – July 20, 2022) was an American Eastern Orthodox priest, "Jesus freak" and former leader of the "Jesus movement". He was also the founder of Orthodox Christian Prison Ministry.

== Biography ==
Pederson was born in Hastings, Minnesota, US and had three sisters and a brother.

After moving to California, he was a leader in the Jesus People Movement during the 1960s and 1970s. He was also the founding editor and publisher of the Hollywood Free Paper which was a Christian response to countercultural underground newspapers. As circulation grew rapidly from California to Europe, the Paper became the most widely distributed Jesus Movement publication. It ran from 1969 to 1978. From 1979 to 1980, it became Visit, a periodical ministry to prisoners under the name Christian Prison Volunteers. The paper ceased publication in 1980, but briefly resumed from 1987 to 1988 under its former title.

He was credited with coining the terms "Jesus people" and "Jesus movement", but clarified in an audio interview that those words were attributed to him by a news agency when he said "We're people who love Jesus."

Pederson joined the Antiochian Orthodox Church where he received Holy Orders and was ordained as a priest in 1991.

In 1993, Metropolitan Philip, Primate of the Antiochian Archdiocese of North America, asked Pederson, an experienced prison minister, to establish a prison ministry for the Archdiocese.

In 2005, Philip offered the Archdiocese's prison ministry to the Standing Conference of the Canonical Orthodox Bishops in the Americas (SCOBA). Shortly thereafter, Orthodox Christian Prison Ministry (OCPM) was chartered by SCOBA as its official prison ministry.

During this time, Pederson also assisted three churches in California: St. Nicholas Cathedral of Los Angeles, St. Matthew Church of Torrance, and Holy Cross Church of Palmdale.

In 2009, Pederson edited a 35th anniversary edition of the Hollywood Free Paper.

In 2014, he wrote Larger Than Ourselves: The Early Beginnings of the Jesus People, (Hollywood, California: Hollywood Free Paper, 2014). In the book, he recounted some of the earliest stories of how the Jesus People movement began and includes pictures of key figures and places throughout the early years of the movement.

Later semi-retired, Pederson ministered to prisoners and those on the street, through homeless shelters, as well as serving various parishes in Southern California and Minnesota of the Antiochian Orthodox Church. After his retirement, he returned to his home state of Minnesota where he served at St. George Church of West St. Paul.

He died on July 20, 2022, in Eagan, Minnesota. His funeral was held at St. George Antiochian Orthodox Church, West St. Paul, Minnesota. He is buried at Lakeside Cemetery in Hastings, Minnesota.

== Awards ==
In 2012, Pederson was presented with the Matthew 25:36 Award for his lifetime achievement in prison ministry. The award contains a piece of a prison bar from Graterford State Prison, Philadelphia with the inscription of Matthew 25:36 ("I was in prison and you came to me...").

In 2016, he was awarded the Archdiocese's Silver Order of St. Raphael of Brooklyn.

== See also ==
- Evangelical Orthodox Church – American Christian denomination, 1979–
