= All Saved Freak Band =

American Christian band

- Origin: Geneva, Ohio, U.S.
- Genres: Christian, blues, Jesus music
- Years active: 1968–1978
- Label: Hidden Vision Records
- Website: www.AllSavedFreakBand.com

The All Saved Freak Band was a band from Geneva, Ohio. They were one of the earliest influences on contemporary christian music. Broadcasting their first recorded songs on WREO radio in Ashtabula County, Ohio, in the fall of 1968, ASFB joined Larry Norman and the California group Agape as one of the original pioneers of Jesus music.

ASFB was an ensemble group of 12 musicians. Their music was known for its combination of blues and string arrangements. ASFB recorded four albums now recognized as classic examples of the earliest "Jesus music." Though courted by RCA and Columbia, ASFB never signed a contract in an effort to maintain control of the band's music and direction.

== History ==
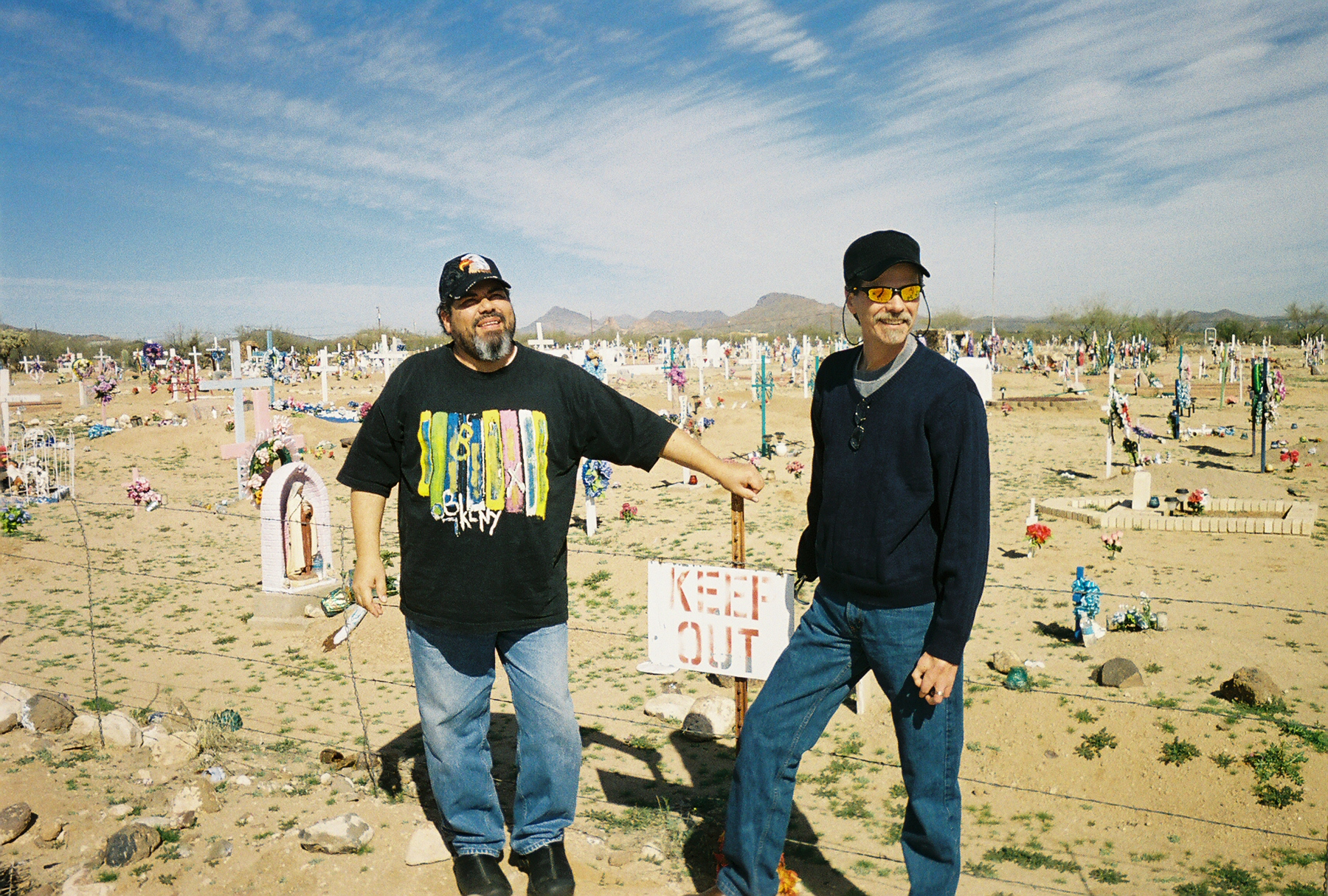
Two of CCM's earliest pioneers: Fred Caban [L], of Agape, and Joe Markko of the All Saved Freak Band

Based out of a Christian commune near Orwell, Ohio, members included co-founders Joe Markko and Larry Hill, Mike Berkey, Ed Durkos, Tom Eritano, Tim Hill, Morgan King, Norris McClure, Carole King, Randy Markko, Kim Massman, Pam Massman, Tom Miller, and rock guitarist Glenn Schwartz. Schwartz was lead-guitarist for the rock group, the James Gang (later replaced by Joe Walsh) and Pacific Gas & Electric who recorded a top 20 song in 1969, Are You Ready? Temporary replacements for Glenn Schwartz and Tom Eritano were guitarist Phil Keaggy of Glass Harp and drummer, Val Fuentes from the California band, It's a Beautiful Day. Prior to recording their first album, three band members—Brett Hill [Larry's son], Joe's brother Randy and Tom Miller—all lost their lives in automobile accidents while traveling to concerts. Singing backup and playing piano, Tom "Aquinas" Miller was one of the "Kent-25" and had been featured in Life magazine as part of the protests on the Kent State campus at the time of the Kent State shootings. Though the music on their first album, My Poor Generation, was written between 1968 and 1972, it was not released until 1973 and was dedicated to the memories of Randy Markko and Tom Miller. "The totally essential Jesus rock album featuring some baroque chamber folk with harpsichord, strings, piano and woodwinds, some otherworldly smoky dream psych and some stripped-down electric boogie blues. This was an odd congregation that collectively created an atmosphere representing the best in what was once Jesus rock."

Their second album, For Christians, Elves and Lovers (1976) combined evangelical theology and millennialism with admiration for the fantasy world of The Lord of the Rings author J.R.R. Tolkien. A copy of this album remains part of the Tolkien Collection at Marquette University. "And what is the result of this musical fusion? An absolutely incredible album which might well become a classic in the annals of Jesus music. The credit for this record's brilliance belongs to the artists themselves. Because of their talent and versatility, the 14 cuts never suffer from being repetitious or boring. One need only look at the diversity in style from one selection to the next in order to appreciate the creative abilities of these musicians. This is the 3rd album for ASFB and belongs on the shelf of every Jesus music fan."

The band was shaken again in early 1973 when co-founder and guitarist Joe Markko was electrocuted with 27,000 volts of electricity in an industrial accident. Losing both hands and massively burned over 55% of his body, Markko remained in the Burn Unit of Cleveland MetroHealth for 9 months. Rhythm guitarist Ed Durkos learned all of Markko's music and the band moved forward. Following Markko's release he continued writing, singing and arranging for the band.

In February 1975, after lead guitarist Glenn Schwartz's family grew concerned about the deteriorating social conditions at the church's communal farm, they had him kidnapped for an intense, three-day "deprogramming" effort by famed cult deprogrammer Ted Patrick. The attempt was unsuccessful and the Band issued their third album, Brainwashed in, as what one ex-member termed, "a cynical response" to critics of the band's lifestyle. Brainwashed is listed as album #4 on the "Top 50 Collectible Jesus Music Albums of all Time," compiled by contemporary Church historian David DiSabatino. "This is a tough band to figure out. With some of the best Christian 70s rock by anyone anywhere their music is stunningly powerful with a dark, creeping psychrock menace achieved via songwriting and guitar/organ arrangements that spell big league all the way. If "For Christians, Elves & Lovers" is the mellower side of ASFB, "Brainwashed" is the flip side of the coin. This album is non-stop sizzling stuff with plenty of heavy organ, harmonica and, of course, Glenn Schwartz's searing guitar fireworks. This is an incredible album folks. So much variety here, too—it never gets boring."

Their fourth album, Sower, was released in 1980 after all the band members had departed except for Hill and the Massmann sisters. Especially influential on the lyrics of this recording were Larry Hill's apocalyptic visions. "Man, these guys were just so good! Wailing away one minute—folk mood, jazz lightness the next. Seems impossible on paper, but with ASFB it works. Showing maturity in sound and lyric, all tracks are standouts. All their albums are treasures with layers of interest both musically and lyrically."

ASFB mastered their albums at Cleveland Recording. Housed in an older building on Euclid Avenue it was eventually torn down to make way for the burgeoning growth of Cleveland State University. ASFB recorded alongside some well-known "Great Lakes" rock groups. The Outsiders' "Time Won't Let Me", Wild Cherry's "Play That Funky Music", The Lemon Pipers' "Green Tambourine", The Human Beinz' "Nobody but Me", Grand Funk Railroad's first seven albums, and the James Gang's albums were all recorded here, using the Cleveland Orchestra whenever needed. The engineer and owner, Ken Hamann, teamed up with Nashville producer, Rob Galbraith, on all of ASFB's recordings. The band met Rob while on tour in Nashville in 1971 when Glenn, Larry, Randy and Joe taped a demo of a few songs at the Columbia Studio. Rob also recorded an impromptu version of Old Rugged Cross that appears on more than one album.

Independently produced and distributed, the music of the All Saved Freak Band had been played on hundreds of radio stations in more than 14 different countries by the time they disbanded in the winter of 1978-79. Ministering in the street, in concert and across denominational lines for more than a decade, the band's demise was based on irreconcilable differences between band members and the leadership of their home church that involved legally prosecuted charges of child abuse. Larry, Ed and the Massmann sisters would attempt to continue the effort until 1980 but the All Saved Freak Band was gone following the departures of Joe Markko and Glenn Schwartz.

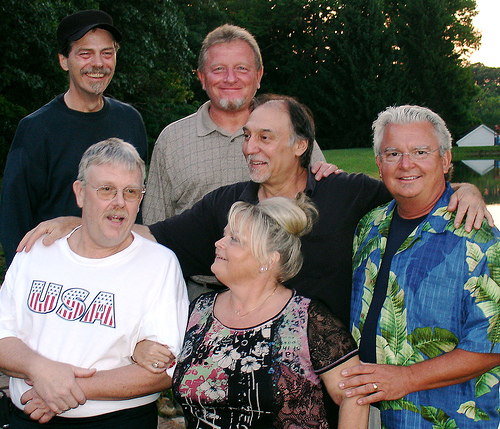
ASFB Reunion 2007. [Front] Ed Durkos, Carole [King] Hough and Morgan King. [Back] Joe Markko, Norris McClure and Tom Eritano. Mike Berkey, Tim Hill and Glenn Schwartz were unable to attend

In 2006, after several years of legal efforts, former band members united to regain control of their music and end Hill's 35-year control of their collective efforts. Releasing a "Best of" collection, Harps On Willows, ASFB has established an ongoing musical legacy. The album was honored when selected by Cross Rhythms Magazine as one of the Top 20 CD Releases of 2006 along with releases from Bob Dylan and Switchfoot. "Here's a welcome collating of the best performances from one of America's greatest hippie Christian bands. While bands like Petra and Resurrection Band spent the '70s perfecting a heavy rock'n'roll, ASFB ploughed a bluesier furrow with ace blues guitarist Glenn Schwartz exemplifying his renowned skills. One joy is the fact that they wrote songs that were simple in their message. These are songs to get people to think about the Gospel, an art that seems to be missing in modern Christian music. These recordings are very much of their time so they are a little ragged around the edges production wise but the band certainly fulfilled their ambition to create music that would stop people in their tracks and make them respond to the Gospel."

The 2006 Emmy-nominated documentary, Lonnie Frisbee: Life and Death of a Hippie Preacher, by David Di Sabatino features two songs by the All Saved Freak Band ("Sower" and "My Poor Generation"), and the soundtrack to the documentary also included "Ode To Glenn Schwartz".

== Ministry ==
The All Saved Freak Band played throughout the eastern portion of North America and Canada. As guests of the city of New Orleans, they played and testified at Mayor Moon Landrieu's private Mardi Gras reception held at City Hall, playing in Jackson Square and other venues during the day. ASFB also performed at the 1976 Summer Olympics in Montreal, playing as headliners at the Man and His World pavilion. Following a series of concerts at "Spring Break" in Fort Lauderdale, national publications as diverse as Christianity Today, Rolling Stone Magazine and the National Courier began carrying articles about the group.

Several of the band members were credentialed ministers, licensed with the Full Gospel Fellowship of Churches and Ministers International in Irving, Texas. With evangelistic fervor, they were obsessively focused on the work of "winning the lost," stressing personal evangelism at all concert events. Indian reservations in Canada, mental institutions in Maine, prisons in Ohio, rotundas and halls of State office buildings, International Exposition Halls, camps of migrant workers, tents at County Fairs, Churches in most states east of the Mississippi, open-air platforms, Music Halls, military bases, colleges, amphitheaters, nursing homes, parking lots, street corners and hay lofts—the band's flexibility allowed it to present a variety of musical expressions best serving the needs of evangelism. Creating their own label, Rock the World Enterprises [changed to War Again on the final recording], the group was entirely self-financed.

== Discography ==
- My Poor Generation, 1973 (Rock The World)
- For Christians, Elves, and Lovers, 1976 (Rock The World)
- Brainwashed, 1976 (Rock The World)
- Sower, 1980, (War Again)
- Harps On Willows: Best of the All Saved Freak Band, July 4, 2006 (Hidden Vision)
