= Calvary Chapel Costa Mesa =

- Calvary Chapel Costa Mesa
- Location: Costa Mesa, California
- Country: United States
- Denomination: Calvary Chapel
- Website: www.calvarychapelcostamesa.com

History
- Status: Church
- Founded: 1965
- Founder: Chuck Smith

Architecture
- Functional status: Active

Calvary Chapel Costa Mesa is a Christian megachurch located near the boundary between the cities of Costa Mesa and Santa Ana in Orange County. Although the church takes its name from its original facilities on the Costa Mesa side of the boundary, it is now in Santa Ana. The original Calvary Chapel, the church has grown since 1965 from a handful of people, led by senior pastor Chuck Smith, to become the "mother church" of over one thousand congregations worldwide. Outreach Magazine's list of the 100 Largest Churches in America lists attendance as 9,500, making it the thirty-ninth largest in America.

== History ==
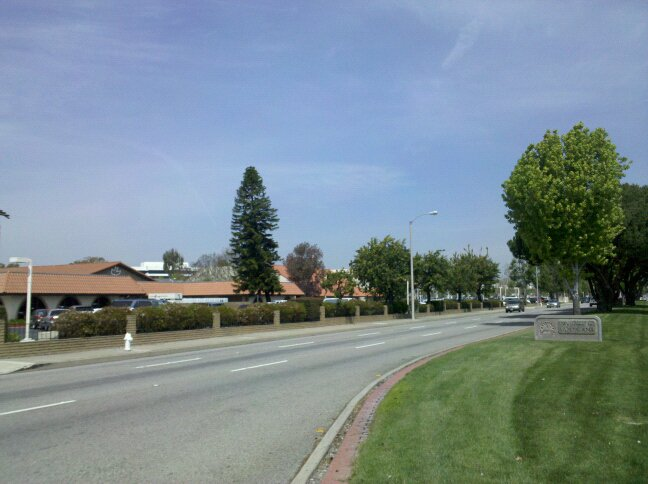
Main sanctuary as seen from the median of Fairview Ave.

Chuck Smith started pastoring at Calvary Chapel in 1965 with a congregation of only twenty-five. Smith's style was to preach straight from the Bible, mostly without deviation. In 1968 Smith, who was looking for a way to bring Christ to the current generation of hippies and surfers, invited Lonnie Frisbee and his wife, Connie, to work with the area's hippies alongside John Nicholson and John Higgins at "The House of Miracles". Within a week, the ministry had 35 new converts. Frisbee's charismatic, Pentecostal style caused some disagreement within the church, as he appeared to be more intent on gaining converts and experiencing the presence of the Holy Spirit than on teaching Biblical doctrine. Frisbee's experiential charismatic approach was a key element in the foundation in Southern California of what was later termed the Jesus movement in the early part of the 1970s. Subsequent to Frisbee's arrival, Calvary Chapel claimed thousands of converts and the newly baptized joined the movement before the phenomenon later spread throughout North America, Central America, Europe, Australia and New Zealand.

At the beginning of the Jesus movement and into the 1970s, Calvary Chapel Costa Mesa was the home church of two pioneering Jesus music groups, Children of the Day and Love Song. Both had their early albums released on the Chuck Smith-created music label, Maranatha! Music.

As of 2009, there are more than 1500 Calvary Chapel congregations worldwide. Along with Maranatha! Music, Smith also formed The Word for Today in 1978, a publishing/radio broadcasting ministry that is still in existence.

On October 3, 2013, Smith died of lung cancer. He remained as senior pastor at the church throughout his long illness, including preaching at three services the Sunday before his death.

Brian Brodersen, Smith's son-in-law, became senior pastor following Smith's death.

The 2023 film Jesus Revolution depicts the growth of Calvary Chapel and the Jesus movement, with Chuck Smith played by Kelsey Grammer.

In 2026, Calvary Chapel announced that they ordain women as pastors.

== Controversy ==
Some Christian media have detailed a variety of allegations involving Smith and the leadership of Calvary Chapel Costa Mesa. These include financial improprieties and lax standards for sexual improprieties.

A lawsuit was filed alleging that Smith and others at Calvary Chapel Costa Mesa knew or should have known that a minister named Anthony Iglesias was prone to committing sexual abuse when they moved him from ministry positions in Diamond Bar, California, to Thailand, to Post Falls, Idaho. Iglesias was convicted of lewd conduct with two 14-year-old boys in California in 2004, and the lawsuit stemmed from events in Idaho, but all alleged abuse occurred in or before 2003. The Costa Mesa congregation is involved solely due to its leadership role among Calvary Chapels.
