= Jesus movement =

Former evangelical Christian movement

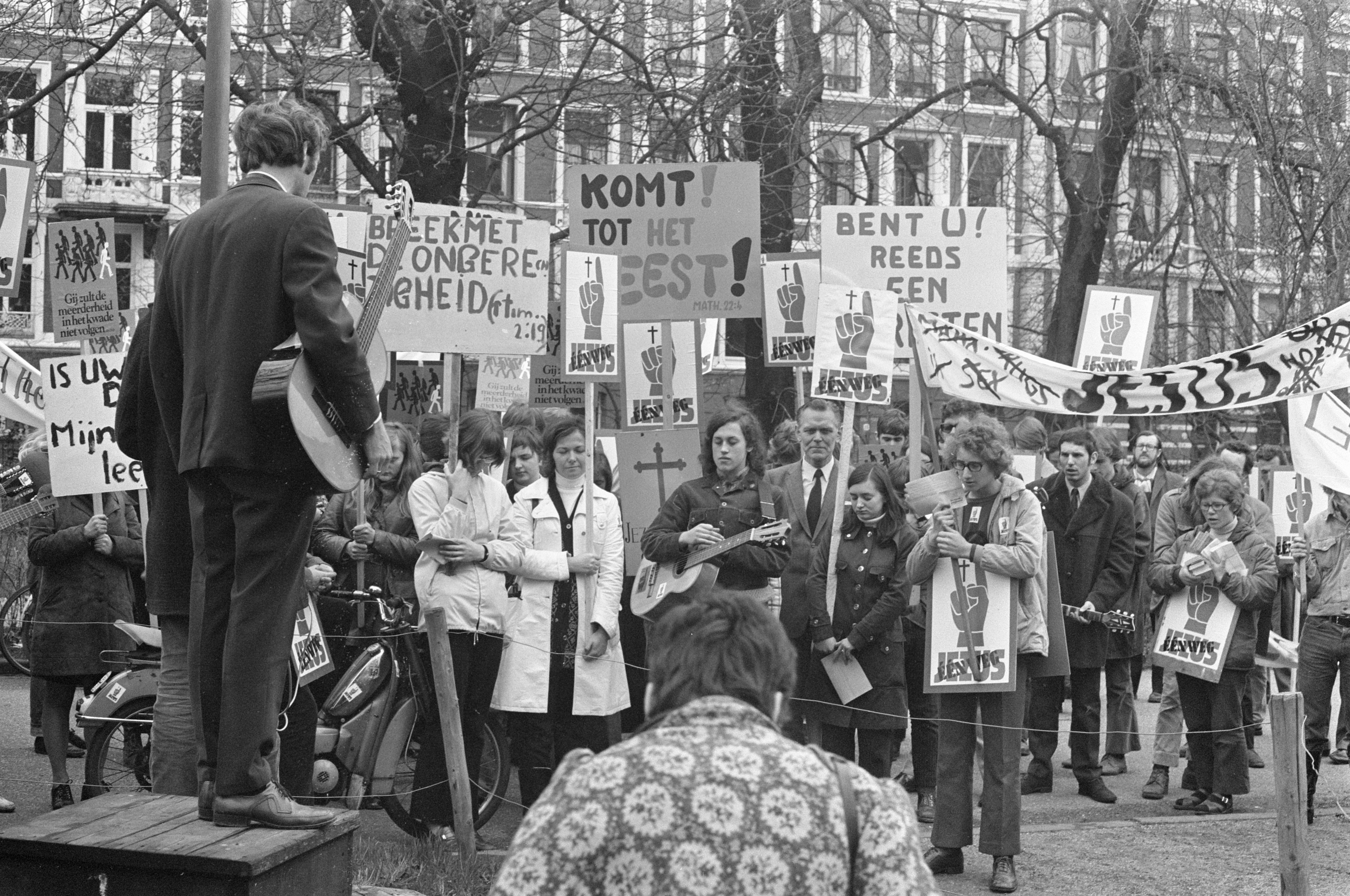
- Jesus movement in Amsterdam
- Years active: Late 1960s – early 1970s
- Location: West Coast of the United States
- Influences: Hippie

The Jesus movement was an evangelical Protestant movement that began on the West Coast of the United States in the late 1960s and early 1970s and primarily spread throughout North America, Europe, Central America, Australia and New Zealand, before it subsided in the late 1980s. Members of the movement were called Jesus people or Jesus freaks.

The Jesus movement predecessor, the charismatic movement, had already been for about a decade. It involved mainline Protestants and Catholics who testified to having supernatural experiences similar to those recorded in the Acts of the Apostles, especially speaking in tongues. The two movements similarly believed that they were calling the church back to a more biblically accurate version of Christianity. Furthermore, they believed that these changes would result in the restoration of spiritual gifts to the church.

The Jesus movement left a legacy that included the formation of various denominations, church groups, and other Christian organizations, and it also influenced the development of both the contemporary Christian right and Christian left. It was foundational in several ongoing Christian cultural movements, including Jesus music's impact on contemporary Christian music, and the development of Christian media as a radio and film industry.

== History ==
=== Origins ===
The terms Jesus movement and Jesus people were popularized by Duane Pederson in his writings for the Hollywood Free Paper. In an interview with Sean Dietrich which took place on August 19, 2006, Pederson explained that he did not coin the phrase "Jesus People"; moreover, he credited a magazine/television interviewer who asked him if he was part of the "Jesus People". As a result, Pederson was credited to be the phrase's founder.

The term Jesus People is used to describe the group composed of outcast and anti-religious individuals who, during the 1960s and 1970s, turned towards the Christian faith and Jesus. They converted to Christianity and subsequently changed their lives to reflect the scripture and teachings of Jesus.

During the 1970s, many younger generations were pulled away from the average structured lifestyle they were told to live, and instead turned to lifestyles that were referred to as counterculture. This new lifestyle consisted of exploring various drugs, paths of spirituality and religions. Despite the growing popularity of the counterculture, many young adults became confused, which led them to turn towards the church. People who identified as hippies came forward sharing their testimonies and the peace they found after turning towards the Jesus lifestyle.

=== Growth and decline ===
Secular and Christian media exposure in 1971 and 1972 caused the Jesus movement to explode across the United States, which attracted evangelical youth eager to identify with the movement. While many other communes and fellowships sprang up, the Shiloh and Children of God communities attracted more new believers.

Explo '72 was an event organized by the Campus Crusade for Christ which was held at the Cotton Bowl Stadium in Dallas, and involved such conservative leaders as Bill Bright and Billy Graham. Many of the 80,000 young Jesus People attending Explo '72 discovered for the first time these and other traditional avenues of Christian worship and experience. Although Explo '72 marked the high-water mark of media interest, the Jesus movement continued at a grass-roots level with smaller individual groups and communities.

The movement began to subside, largely concluding by the late 1980s, but left a major influence in Christian music, youth and church life.

=== Legacy ===
Although the Jesus movement lasted no more than a decade (except for the intentional community Jesus People USA, which continues to exist in Chicago), its influence on Christian culture can still be seen. Thousands of converts moved into leadership positions in churches and parachurch organizations. The informality of the Jesus movement's music and worship affected almost all evangelical churches. Some of the fastest-growing U.S. denominations of the late 20th century, such as Calvary Chapel, Hope Chapel Churches, Victory Outreach, Vineyard Churches, and Sovereign Grace Churches, trace their roots directly back to the Jesus movement, as do parachurch organizations like Jews for Jesus and the contemporary Christian music industry. Perhaps the most significant and lasting influence, however, was the growth of an emerging strand within evangelical Christianity that appealed to the contemporary youth culture.

The culture of youth began to change far before the Jesus movement of the 1960s and 1970s. Billy Graham, one of the leading evangelists of this time, started to see changes in youth during the late 1940s. Through the 1960s, college campuses all across the country were beginning to add campus ministries. Some of the organizations for this were Campus Crusade for Christ, Fellowship of Christian Athletes, and InterVarsity Christian Fellowship.

Jesus music, which grew out of the movement, was very influential in the creation of various subgenres of contemporary Christian music during the late 20th and early 21st centuries, such as Jesus Culture and Hillsong in both America and the UK. This also led to the inclusion of new musical instruments in churches all over the world, such as guitars and drums, in addition to traditional musical instruments such as pianos and organs. Music in other parts of the world was also greatly influenced by the Jesus movement, such as music in Central America. In Central America, Pentecostal churches under the charismatic movement began to compose spiritual music called coros (fast-paced hymns), normally accompanied by dancing as worship.

The topic was the subject of the 2023 film Jesus Revolution.

== Beliefs and practices ==
The Jesus movement was restorationist in theology, seeking to return to the original life of the early Christians. As a result, Jesus people viewed churches, especially those in the United States, as apostate, and took a decidedly countercultural political stance in general. The theology of the Jesus movement also called for a return to simple living and asceticism in some cases. The Jesus people had a strong belief in miracles, signs and wonders, faith, healing, prayer, the Bible, and powerful works of the Holy Spirit. For example, a revival at Asbury College in 1970 grabbed the attention of the mainstream news media and became known nationwide.

The movement tended towards evangelism and millennialism. Charismatic manifestations of the gifts of the Holy Spirit were not uncommon. Some of the books read by those within the movement included Ron Sider's Rich Christians in an Age of Hunger and Hal Lindsey's The Late Great Planet Earth. The Bible was the most read book by far, and provided the foundational truth for the movement.

The Jesus movement also had a communal aspect. The commune of Graham Pulkingham was described in his book They Left Their Nets.

The expansion of the Jesus movement among young people was encouraged and spread through the practice of baptisms; moreover, the West Coast was a popular location for these mass baptisms. Another popular practice within the movement was evangelism, which is the act of spreading the Gospel; furthermore, because of active evangelism, thousands of young students in southern states converted and began living Jesus-focused lives.

== Jesus music ==
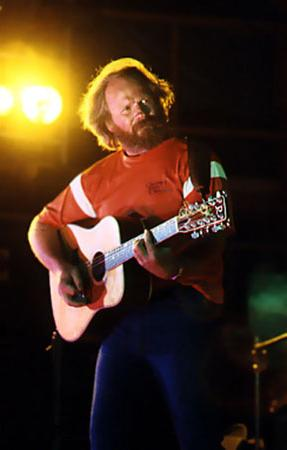
Barry McGuire

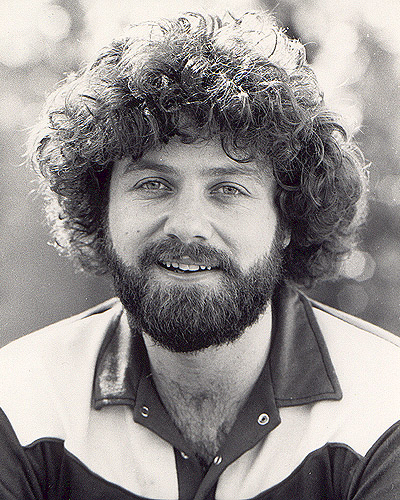
Keith Green

There has been a long legacy of Christian music being connected to the Jesus movement. Jesus music, referred to as gospel beat music in the UK, primarily began when street musicians of the late 1960s and early 1970s converted to Christianity. They kept playing the same style of music they had played before, but they began to write lyrics containing a Christian message. Many music groups started out of this, and some became leaders within the Jesus movement, most notably Barry McGuire, Love Song, Second Chapter of Acts, All Saved Freak Band, Servant, Petra, Resurrection Band, Phil Keaggy, Paul Clark, Dion DiMucci, Paul Stookey of Peter, Paul, and Mary; Randy Stonehill, Randy Matthews, Andraé Crouch (and the Disciples), Nancy Honeytree, Keith Green, and Larry Norman. The Joyful Noise Band traveled with a Christian community throughout the US and Europe, and they performed in festivals that were held underneath giant tents. In the UK, Malcolm and Alwyn were the most notable agents of the gospel beat.

The Jesus People: Old-Time Religion in the Age of Aquarius by Enroth, Ericson, and Peters stated that Chuck Smith of Calvary Chapel in Costa Mesa, California founded the first Christian rock labels when he launched the Maranatha! Music label in 1971 as an outlet for the Jesus music bands performing at Calvary worship services. However, in 1970 Larry Norman recorded, produced, and released two albums: Street Level and Born Twice for Randy Stonehill. on his own label, One Way Records.

== Organizations ==
=== Belmont Avenue Church of Christ ===
Don Finto became involved with the Belmont Avenue Church of Christ (now simply Belmont Church), an ailing old inner city church in Nashville, Tennessee, YUS on Music Row between the public housing and several universities: Peabody, Vanderbilt and Belmont College. By the summer of 1971, the membership roll had dropped to about 75 elderly members. The church had mainstream roots in the a cappella Churches of Christ, but was transformed and firmly placed in the Jesus movement by an influx of countercultural Christians. Seating ran out, with people sitting on the windowsills or on the stage. It was not rare to find them walking the worst parts of Lower Broadway witnessing to prostitutes and addicts. The concerts that were held at the Koinonia Coffee House on weekends helped east coast Christian music to grow in popularity. The house band was called Dogwood, and various musicians regularly appeared on stage, such as Dogwood, Amy Grant, Brown Bannister, Chris Christian, Don Francisco, Fireworks, and Annie and Steve Chapman.

=== Calvary Chapel ===
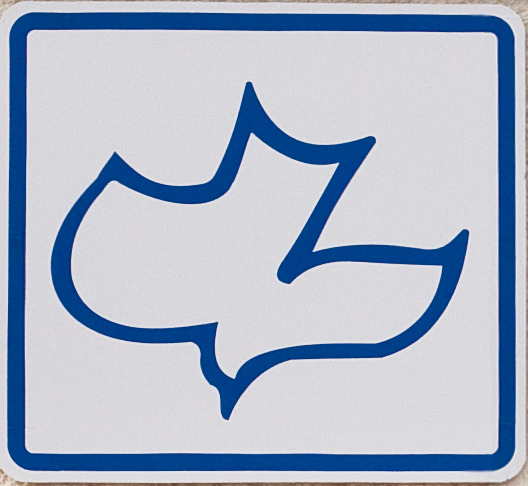
Calvary Chapel, one of the leading churches during this movement

Chuck Smith, founder and pastor of Calvary Chapel Costa Mesa, led with expositional verse-by-verse Bible studies. While he taught that the spiritual gifts seen and described in the New Testament were at work today, there were Biblical restrictions on the exercise of those gifts among believers in their services. He baptized members in the Pacific Ocean. Smith was one of the few pastors who welcomed in the hippies who after coming to faith, eventually became known as Jesus people, and thus allowed for the dramatic future growth of a network of affiliate churches.

=== Fellowship House Church ===
Steve Freeman and others opened the Kingdom Come Christian Coffee House in Greenville, South Carolina, in 1971. Each Saturday night Jesus People gathered for worship, songs and fellowship. In 1972, several people who were highly involved in the Kingdom Come graduated from high schools and dispersed in several colleges and universities throughout the Southeastern United States and started a Fellowship House Church. Maynard Pittendreigh, Jay Holmes, and Freeman each established one at Erskine College, the University of South Carolina, and Furman University respectively. Leadership moved from Steve Freeman to a charismatic preacher named Erskine Holt, a self-described apostle of the movement who lived in Florida. By 1973, nearly every campus throughout Florida, South Carolina, North Carolina, and Georgia had Fellowship House Churches. These generally died out by 1977, with many of the members moving to more traditional campus ministries. However, many moved onto similar ministries in such organizations as Calvary Chapel.

=== Jesus Army ===
In the UK, the Jesus Army (also known as the Jesus Fellowship Church and the Bugbrooke Community) was among the groups most influenced by the Jesus movement, embracing (former) hippies, bikers and drug addicts, among others. Leaders and members of the Jesus Fellowship committed abuse of children and vulnerable adults, with several receiving custodial sentences. The Jesus Fellowship Community Trust closed in December 2020 following the scandal, and issued a Closure Statement including an unreserved apology for the abuse that occurred in the Jesus Fellowship Church (JFC) and the residential New Creation Christian Community (NCCC).

=== Shiloh Youth Revival Centers ===
The Shiloh Youth Revival Centers movement was the largest Jesus People communal movement in the United States in the 1970s. Founded by John Higgins in 1968 as a small communal house in Costa Mesa, California, the movement quickly grew into a very large movement catering mostly to disaffected college-age youth. There were 100,000 people involved and 175 communal houses established during its lifespan. Two years after the movement's founding, Higgins and some of the core members of the movement bought 90 acres (360,000 m^{2}) of land near Dexter, Oregon, and built a new headquarters which they called "The Land".

== Jesus freak ==
Jesus freak is a term arising from the late 1960s and early 1970s counterculture and is frequently used as a pejorative for those involved in the Jesus movement. As Tom Wolfe illustrates in The Electric Kool-Aid Acid Test, the term freak with a preceding qualifier was a strictly neutral term and described any counterculture member with a specific interest in a given subject; hence acid freak and Jesus freak. The term "freak" was in common-enough currency that Hunter S. Thompson's failed bid for sheriff of Pitkin County, Colorado, was as a member of the "Freak Power" party.

However, many later members of the movement, those misunderstanding the countercultural roots, believed the term to be negative, and co-opted and embraced the term, and its usage broadened to describe a Christian subculture throughout the hippie and back-to-the-land movements that focused on universal love and pacifism, and relished the radical nature of Jesus' message. Jesus freaks often carried and distributed copies of the Good News for Modern Man, a 1966 translation of the New Testament written in modern English. In Australia, and other countries, the term Jesus freak, along with Bible basher, is still used in a derogatory manner. In Germany, there is a Christian youth culture, also called Jesus Freaks International, that claims to have its roots in the U.S. movement.

== See also ==
- Operation Mobilisation
