= The Man in the White Van =

2023 film directed by Warren Skeels

- Theatrical release poster
- Directed by: Warren Skeels
- Written by: Sharon Y. Cobb; Warren Skeels
- Produced by: Anne Marie Gillen; Terri Lubaroff; Michael Nole; Paul Scanlan; Warren Skeels
- Starring: Madison Wolfe; Brec Bassinger; Skai Jackson; Gavin Warren; Ali Larter; Sean Astin
- Cinematography: Gareth Paul Cox
- Edited by: Billy Gaggins
- Music by: Scott Borland
- Production companies: Legion M; Garrison Film Company; Skeels Films; XYZ Films
- Distributed by: Relativity Media
- Release dates: October 14, 2023 (Newport Beach Film Festival); December 13, 2024
- Running time: 105 minutes
- Country: United States
- Language: English
- Box office: $529,879

The Man in the White Van is a 2023 American thriller film directed by Warren Skeels. The film stars Madison Wolfe, Brec Bassinger, Skai Jackson, Gavin Warren, Ali Larter and Sean Astin.

It premiered at the 2023 Newport Beach Film Festival and was released by Relativity Media in theaters on December 13, 2024.

== Premise ==
In the early 1970s, teenager Annie (Madison Wolfe), who is having problems living with her sister and brother, reports to her parents that she has seen a white van following her a few times, but her parents disagree with her complaints stating that it is paranoia.

The film is loosely based on the crimes of Billy Mansfield Jr., a Florida-based serial killer active from 1975 to 1980. Mansfield Jr. was responsible for multiple abductions and murders, including victims as young as 13 years old. The movie focuses on the perspective of the victims rather than the killer, highlighting the fear and trauma experienced by those stalked by the white van. Mansfield’s crimes were discovered decades later, with authorities uncovering remains on his property in Hernando County, Florida. He is currently serving four life sentences in a California prison hospital for the criminally insane in Stockton, CA.

== Plot ==
The story is set in Florida in the mid-1970s. A teenager named Annie Williams lives with her older sister Margaret, her younger brother Daniel, and their parents. Annie enjoys horseback riding (her horse is named "Rebel") and often ventures out into nature.

Annie begins to notice a white van appearing in places she frequents: while riding her horse, on her way home, in the woods. The van seems to follow or observe her. She reports the strange van to her parents, but they dismiss her fears as paranoia. Her older sister Margaret and friends are initially skeptical. Annie's best friend Patty, however, believes her.

Interspersed with Annie's storyline are flashback sequences showing earlier victims: young women abducted by the same or similar "man in the white van". These provide backstory for the killer's pattern. These earlier abductions go largely unnoticed or unconnected at the time.

Annie's fear intensifies: the van's presence becomes more threatening, she becomes increasingly isolated, and the margin of safety shrinks. On Halloween night, her worst fears begin to materialize: the stalking culminates in an abduction.

Annie is captured and finds herself in the back of the white van. She awakens, fights back, opens the van door and jumps out as it approaches her home. She bangs on her front door; her sister Margaret finally hears and pulls her inside just as the man approaches the house. The man breaks in; Annie and Margaret flee through a window, fall to the ground, locate the van, hop inside and attempt to get away. The man pursues them.

Annie reverses the van when the man tries to snatch Margaret, backing into a bush to stop the vehicle, and then drives forward, hitting the man who's lying on the ground. A police officer arrives (thanks to Patty's help) but when they look for the man, he is nowhere to be found.

One month later, Annie and her family appear to have attempted to move on: they have dinner together, and life seems superficially normal. Annie's horse "Rebel" is gone (either sold or given away).

The film's climax reveals that the man in the white van escapes. A mid-credits scene shows a family on a camping trip; the daughter finds a white van parked nearby, implying that the predator is still out there.

== Cast ==
- Madison Wolfe as Annie Williams
- Brec Bassinger as Margaret Williams
- Skai Jackson as Patty Tolliver
- Gavin Warren as Daniel Williams
- Ali Larter as Helen Williams
- Sean Astin as Richard Williams
- Noah Lomax as Mark Newsome
- Deborah Ann Woll as Waitress
- Brighton Sharbino as Swimmer
- Ryan Whitney as Young mother
- Addison Riecke as Joanna
- Julianne Arrieta as Miss Engram
- Darrius Thomas as Charlie
- Dylan Summerall as Kyle
- Stacy Ann Rose as Patty's Mom
- Patrick Kirton as Jim
- Brooke Hyland as Teen Girl

== Reception ==
On the review aggregator website Rotten Tomatoes, 55% of 20 critics' reviews are positive, with an average rating of 5.5/10.

In his review on Film Threat, Alan Ng rated it an 8.5/10 saying that "is the perfect primer for someone thinking about getting into horror films." Jeffrey M. Anderson rated it 1/5 on Common Sense Media saying that "this extremely poor, lumbering thriller, which barely has enough ideas to sustain a 20-minute short, borrows most of its supposedly tense moments from dozens of other, better movies."

== See also ==
- White van man
