= Gavin Warren =

American child actor (born 2008)

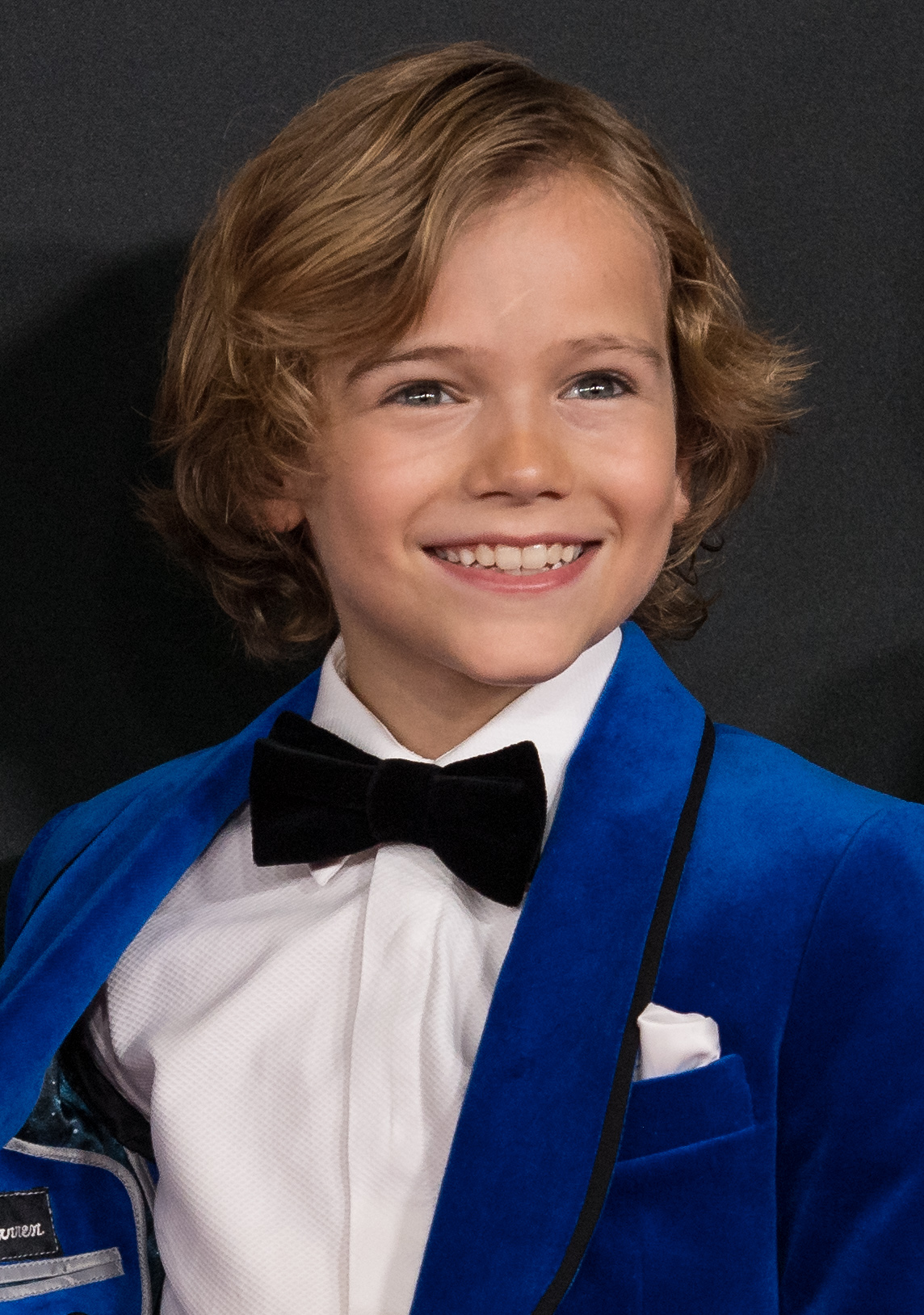
- Warren in 2018
- Born: Gavin Hunter Warren; April 17, 2008 (age 18); Houston, Texas, U.S.
- Occupations: Actor, model
- Years active: 2017–present
- Website: www.gavinwarren.com

Gavin Hunter Warren (born April 17, 2008) is an American actor who is best known for his roles in the films First Man (2018), and Night Swim (2024), as well as his roles in the films The Unbreakable Boy (2025), Man in the White Van, and Geechee. On television, he guest starred on such shows such as Daybreak (2019), NCIS: New Orleans (2020), and Fear the Walking Dead (2023).

== Early life ==
Gavin Hunter Warren was born in Houston, Texas. He began his career as a model on Great Day Houston, a morning show that aired on KHOU 11, in 2015. He began his acting career after winning Most Sought After Male at the International Modeling and Talent Association Los Angeles Convention in 2015.

== Career ==
=== Film acting ===
In his first film, Back Roads (2018), Warren played a supporting role as the son of Jennifer Morrison and Tom Everett Scott.

Warren played Neil Armstrong's (played by Ryan Gosling) son in First Man (2018). The film is a personal account of Neil Armstrong and his 1969 landing on the Moon, and was directed by Damien Chazelle, the Academy Award-winning director of La La Land. Warren won the Red Carpet Fashion Award for best dressed for his outfit at the premiere of the film.

Warren also played Rusty in 12 Mighty Orphans (2021). In flashback scenes, he portrays the young version of the lead role played by Luke Wilson. The film also featured Robert Duvall, Martin Sheen, Vinessa Shaw, Wayne Knight, and Treat Williams. The film was written, directed and produced by Ty Roberts, and was based on the true story of an orphanage football team during the Great Depression.

In the flashback scenes of A Hard Problem (2021), Warren played young Ian, the lead role played by John Berchtold. The film was written, directed and produced by the Hazart, the writer/director duo of Kyle Hasday and Matt Stewart. The film is a dramatic story, focusing on the life of Ian.

In Mister Whisper, Warren will play the lead character. The film will be directed by Robert Glickert and will star Shailene Garnett, Jeff Ward, and Lusia Strus, alongside Warren.

Warren was set to star in the film Geechee. In this film, Warren will play the lead role of Axle, the son of Andrea Riseborough. Principal photography began in 2020, but production was halted due to accident with local authorities.

In The Unbreakable Boy, Warren played Logan LeRette, who is the younger brother of Austin LeRette, the main character, played by Jacob Laval. The film will feature Zachary Levi as their father, Meghann Fahy as their mother, and Patricia Heaton as their grandmother. It is directed by Jon Gunn, with production by Lionsgate and Kingdom Story. The film is based on a true story from a book, entitled The Unbreakable Boy: A Father's Fear, a Son's Courage, and a Story of Unconditional Love, written by Austin's father, Scott Michael LeRette, and Susy Flory. The film was initially set for a March 2022 release date, but Lionsgate moved it up to February 2025.

In Man in the White Van, Warren played Daniel Williams, the younger brother of Annie (played by Madison Wolfe) and Margaret (played by Brec Bassinger). Sean Astin played their father, while Ali Larter played their mother. The film will be directed by Warren Skeels and will be produced by Legion M. This film is based on a true story from 1974 about a white van stalking women in Florida.

=== Television acting ===
Warren played in a flashback episode of Daybreak (2019) as young Josh Wheeler, the lead role played by Colin Ford. This Netflix show was directed by Brad Peyton and Michael Patrick Jann.

Warren also played in a flashback episode NCIS: New Orleans (2020) as young Dwayne Pride, the lead role played by Scott Bakula. The episode was directed and produced by James Hayman.

== Filmography ==
=== Film ===
Year	Title	Role	Notes
2018	Back Roads	Zack Mercer	
2018	First Man	Rick Armstrong	
2019	Mack	Young Mack	
2021	12 Mighty Orphans	Young Rusty	
2021	A Hard Problem	Young Ian	
2023	#FBF	Christian	
2023	The Man in the White Van	Daniel	
2024	Night Swim	Elliot Waller	
2024	Long Shadows	Young Marcus Dollar	
2025	The Unbreakable Boy	Logan LeRette	
2025	The Empty Chair	John Semander	Short film
2025	Mister Whisper	Jacob Malcolm	
TBA	Busboys	Young Steef	Post-production
TBA	Geechee	Axel	

=== Television ===
Year	Title	Role	Notes
2018	Great Day Houston	Himself	
2019	Daybreak	8-Year-Old Josh	1 episode
2019	Houston Life	Himself	
2020	NCIS: New Orleans	Little Dwayne Pride	1 episode
2023	Fear the Walking Dead	Finch	6 episodes

=== Internet ===
Year	Title	Role	Notes
2017	Two Wongs Make a White	Sonny Wong	
2020	Tuning It Out	Miles	also Co-Writer
