= MobiTV =

MobiTV, Inc. (previously known as Idetic, Inc.) operated as a provider of live and on-demand video delivery solutions, with its headquarters located in Emeryville, California, United States. Founded in 1999 by Paul Scanlan, Phillip Alvelda, and Jeff Annison, Mobi TV was a privately held company supported by venture capital. Charlie Nooney held the roles of CEO and Chairman of the company on October 15, 2007.

== History ==
MobiTV was one of the first companies to bring live and on-demand TV to mobile devices through partnerships with numerous content providers and carriers such as Sprint and ESPN. In 2016, MobiTV introduced The MOBITV CONNECT Platform, an IP delivery service which allows cable operators to deliver video to connected retail devices such as Roku, Apple TV, Amazon Fire TV and select smart TVs, as well as Android and iOS, in place of a traditional set-top box. The company has raised $163.8 million in eight funding rounds from investors including Adobe Ventures, Ally Bank, Gefinor Capital, Hearst Ventures, Leader Ventures, Menlo Ventures, Redpoint, and Oak Investment Partners. In February 2017, they raised $21 million from repeat investors Ally Bank and Oak Investment Partners.

== Products ==
=== Sprint and Sprint TV ===
Sprint launched Sprint TV in November 2003, which could stream live video and audio at 15 frames per second using MobiTV's technology. The service launched with content from CNN, NBC, Fox Sports, Weather Channel, E! Entertainment, and others. Sprint and MobiTV were recognized with an Engineering Emmy Award for Sprint TV in 2005.

In October 2007, MobiTV and Sprint resigned their deal, in which MobiTV offers Sprint TV, Sprint TV Extra and Sprint TV en Vivo.

In April 2010, MobiTV and Sprint announced the availability of Sprint TV for iPhone users, with access to content from ESPN Mobile, Disney, ABC, NBC, CBS and others. Shortly after, MobiTV announced the application surpassed one million downloads on the Apple App Store, which it attributed to the World Cup tournament.

Sprint announced the availability of the new Sprint Spot content application powered by MobiTV in April 2017 for Android device users.

=== MobiTV application offering ===
In November 2003, MobiTV offered a $10 per month live and on-demand television service available to wireless subscribers, first offered via Sprint.

MobiTV was the wireless television delivery providers for many major U.S. carriers, including Sprint Nextel, Cingular, AT&T, T-Mobile, and Alltel, as well as Telcel, the largest mobile carrier in Mexico, by 2006.

In 2005, MobiTV signed a deal with satellite operator SES Americom to extend its service to customers in Canada, Europe and Latin America. MobiTV and Orange, a former UK mobile network operator, launched the first multi-channel mobile TV service in the UK in 2005. This was MobiTV's first entry into the European market.

MobiTV and AT&T launched an online TV service offering 20 live and on-demand channels delivered via broadband connections in 2006, expanding on the existing deal between the companies. In 2007, MobiTV worked with AT&T to bring the U-verse IPTV service to mobile phones, and later expanded the service to be available through PCs. In other partnerships, MobiTV worked with Microsoft to bring the live television service to Windows Mobile-powered phones and devices in 2006. Also that year, it was reported that MobiTV's technology powered Comcast's mobile television offering in Portland and Boston.

MobiTV's subscriber base surpassed 4 million in 2008, and the company announced a unicast/multicast system for their service, which decreased time lag between changing channels.

On June 3, 2009, MobiTV announced that their live television service has upwards of 7 million subscribers, and the service was available on 350 handheld devices and through 20 different carrier networks. MobiTV saw a 49 percent increase in daily viewership in 2009, which it attributed to the growth of live events available to viewers through its service.

At the CTIA wireless conference in October 2010, MobiTV announced that it would be expanding its offerings beyond the mobile device, to television sets and personal computers.

=== The MOBITV CONNECT Platform ===
In July 2016, the Company announced The MOBITV CONNECT Platform. C Spire announced that it was the first US cable operator to sign on to utilize the platform. C Spire launched the new virtual pay TV service to consumers in July 2017.

The service employs a unicast IP delivery platform that features a fully integrated CMS, DRM, Media Player, nDVR, content policy, identity management, billing and authentication.

Charlie Nooney was recognized as a "Digital All Star" by Broadcasting & Cable in February 2017 for his leadership over the product's introduction. Cablefax also recognized the service as the winner in the Connected TV/Smart TV Solution category of their annual Tech Awards.

In December 2017, the National Cable Television Cooperative (NCTC) announced that they selected MobiTV as a partner to provide IP-based video to its members. NCTC President and CEO Rich Fickle noted that "the deal represents NCTC's most advanced all-IP solution to-date". NCTC members DirectLink, Citizens Fiber, USA Communication, and Hickory Telephone signed on with MobiTV as of December 2017.

=== Advertising technology ===
MobiTV launched an advertising platform in 2005 that allows local affiliates and advertisers to re-purpose national TV ads for local markets.

=== Mobi4BIZ ===
MobiTV launched Mobi4BIZ in 2008, featuring live and on-demand content from CNBC, Bloomberg, Fox Business and TheStreet.com, available on RIM's BlackBerry Bold.

=== MobiTV2 ===
MobiTV announces at CES in 2006 that MobiTV2 will be made available to Sprint and Cingular subscribers, featuring improved audio and video quality, and a programming guide.

=== XM satellite radio application ===
MobiTV developed the XM Satellite Radio applications for Alltel and Cingular, which both launched in 2006. Cingular partnered with MobiTV and Music Choice to offer mobile radio stations to customers with the Nokia 6620 or Sony Ericsson S710 and Z500a devices.
