= Archenemy (film) =

2020 superhero film

- Official poster
- Directed by: Adam Egypt Mortimer
- Screenplay by: Adam Egypt Mortimer
- Story by: Adam Egypt Mortimer; Lucas Passmore
- Produced by: Daniel Noah; Lisa Whalen; Elijah Wood; Kim Sherman; Adan Egypt Mortimer; Joe Manganiello; Nick Manganiello
- Starring: Joe Manganiello; Skylan Brooks; Zolee Griggs; Paul Scheer; Amy Seimetz; Glenn Howerton
- Cinematography: Halyna Hutchins
- Edited by: Lana Wolverton
- Music by: Umberto
- Production companies: SpectreVision; Voltage Pictures; Head Gear Films; Metrol Technology; Almost Never Films; Legion M; 3:59
- Distributed by: RLJE Films
- Release dates: October 7, 2020 (Beyond Fest); December 11, 2020 (United States)
- Running time: 90 minutes
- Countries: United States; United Kingdom
- Language: English
- Box office: $147,757

Archenemy is a 2020 independent superhero mystery-thriller film written and directed by Adam Egypt Mortimer based on a story Mortimer created with Lucas Passmore. Joe Manganiello, who also produced the film, stars in the lead role alongside Skylan Brooks, Paul Scheer, Glenn Howerton, Zolee Griggs, and Amy Seimetz.

Archenemy had its world premiere at Beyond Fest on October 7, 2020. The film was released on December 11, 2020 by RLJE Films.

== Premise ==
A teenager meets a mysterious man named Max Fist, who claims he lost his superpowers after arriving from another dimension. Together, they take to the streets to wipe out a vicious crime boss and his local drug syndicate.

== Cast ==
- Joe Manganiello as Max Fist
- Skylan Brooks as Hamster
- Zolee Griggs as Indigo
- Paul Scheer as Krieg
- Amy Seimetz as Cleo Ventrik
- Glenn Howerton as The Manager
- Jessica Allain as Melissa
- Mac Brandt as Decker
- Christopher Guyton as Bartender
- Kieran Gallagher as Gregor Longman
- Jeremy "JHawk" Hawkins as Gills
- Joseph D. Reitman as Finn

== Production ==
=== Development ===
Archenemy was conceived by Adam Egypt Mortimer after envisioning a single scene in which a "man who wears a tattered cape and sits in a bar drinking whiskey talking about his glory days" and likened his idea to The Wrestler as a superhero movie as "it’s that same sense that his glory is behind him and he’s broken because of it". Mortimer looked to Elektra: Assassin, the works of Grant Morrison, and Pink Floyd - The Wall for inspiration and began fleshing out the story with Lucas Passmore, writer of Slaughterhouse Rulez and the eventual Love Hurts, in 2015. Mortimer wrote the screenplay himself and intentionally avoided telling an origin story, feeling they were overdone and instead aimed to work against the audience's "built-in familiarity" with the genre's tropes.

The filmmaker went on to direct Daniel Isn't Real, but kept Archenemy in his back pocket. By August 2019, Mortimer presented the film to SpectreVision, who produced Daniel Isn't Real, but was waiting for the green light. Eventually, the film was given the go-ahead with a limited budget that allowed Mortimer to make the film "violent and psychedelic" as well as his "most personal". By November, the project was gaining traction with Kim Sherman, Voltage Pictures, and Legion M attached to produce alongside SpectreVision's Daniel Noah, Lisa Whalen, and Elijah Wood.

=== Casting ===
Joe Manganiello was cast as Max Fist in November of 2019. Manganiello, who produced the film along with his brother, Nick, was a fan of the SpectreVision-produced Mandy and wanted to work with the studio. SpectreVision played him Daniel Isn't Real and he promptly signed on. The actor did not see Max as a superhero and instead worked with a man who was homeless for two decades and studied methamphetamine addiction to portray the character. Mortimer previously met with Nicolas Cage for the role. Skylan Brooks and Zolee Griggs were cast as Hamster and Indigo respectively. Amy Seimetz and Glenn Howerton portray the film's antagonists Cleo and The Manager. Mortimer intentionally went against type for casting these characters. Howerton initially felt his casting was risky due to his comedic background. For Seimetz's Cleo, Mortimer discussed "what is it like to be in a relationship with this man who is getting all the credit and he's the hero of the city, but really, you're the smart one".

=== Filming ===
Principal photography began on December 9, 2019 in Los Angeles, California with Halyna Hutchins serving as director of photography. Mortimer described the production of Archenemy as "the most difficult" of his filmography at the time. Manganiello spoke of the filming process as "nerve-wracking", explaining that "on a big studio film, you’d have days to shoot an action sequence like the ones we were doing, we would have, like, an hour or two to knock one out before we had to let everyone go for the day". Filming wrapped by January 19, 2020.

==== Animation ====
The sequences set on Chromium were initially going to be filmed in live action, but budget restraints halted these plans. Instead, Mortimer pivoted to animation. A team of animators were brought in to work on the scenes; their work was "very well done, but felt more like a motion comic" which left Mortimer unsatisfied. The filmmaker turned to comic book artist Sunando C and animators Danny Perez and Kevin Finnegan, instructing them to give the scenes a dreamlike feeling.

=== Post-production ===
The film's editor was Lana Wolverton, who previously cut Fender Bender and The Wave, while the musical score was composed by Umberto. The film's writing credits were finalized in October 2020, with Mortimer receiving sole screenplay credit and shared story credit with Passmore.

== Release ==
Archenemy had its world premiere at Beyond Fest on October 7, 2020. The film also screened at the Sitges Film Festival later that month. The film received an official release by RLJE Films on December 11, 2020. The studio obtained the film's distribution rights in July of that year.

== Reception ==
On review aggregator Rotten Tomatoes, Archenemy has a 76% approval rating based on 54 reviews, with an average rating of 6.2/10. The website's critics consensus reads: "Archenemy fails to follow through on some of its more interesting ideas, but Joe Manganiello's lead performance and the picture's infectious raw energy make for a fun action-adventure." Metacritic reports a score of 57 out of 100 based on seven critic reviews, indicating "mixed or average" reviews.

Bloody Disgusting critic Meagan Navarro wrote "Mortimer does attempt something new with his gritty deconstruction of superhero fare, with entertaining action sequences and dark humor, and that should be enough for fans of this subgenre." For RogerEbert.com, Glenn Kenny praised Manganiello's performance and the animated scenes, but criticized the dialogue. Heather Wixson of Daily Dead commended Mortimer for taking "some pretty big swings" and noted the film's "ingenuity that puts a lot of bigger movies with ten times the budget to shame." Douglas Davidson of Elements of Madness called it "wild and weird" and "a fascinating superhero tale wrapped up in a psychological thriller"." Ed Fortune, writing for Starburst Magazine, called the film "a compelling blend of Don Quixote, The Maxx and Flex Mentallo". Lorry Kikta of Film Threat deemed Archenemy one of the best films of the year.

John DeFore of The Hollywood Reporter said the film "never really coalesces despite some promising elements." Lindsay Traves, writing for Pajiba, was critical of the film's tone, saying "Archenemy presents itself as the punk rock cousin to the flashy superhero film, but attempts to do so in a world where gritty and grounded takes are already in the mainstream." Variety writer Dennis Harvey wrote that Archenemy was "less like a dissection of superhero origin stories than an underdeveloped prologue to one." For The Austin Chronicle, Richard Whittaker said "Mortimer, coming off his critically-acclaimed and award-winning debut Daniel Isn’t Real, never quite strikes a tone or a pace that suits his tale of a (potentially) fractured mind."

== Future ==
=== Possible graphic novel ===
An outline for a graphic novel that would take place immediately after the film's ending was penned by Mortimer.

=== Potential crossover with Daniel Isn't Real ===
In December 2020, while speaking to Bloody Disgusting, Mortimer confirmed a "Vortex Trilogy" consisting of Daniel Isn't Real, Archenemy, and a planned third film, saying "mark my words we are going to make a third movie in the Vortex Trilogy that will have Daniel return and force Max, in some form, to deal with it. A crisis on infinite vortices pulling together as many of the characters from both stories as we can fit for a true cosmic horror/cosmic action crossover hybrid!" Manganiello expressed an interest in returning as Max Fist that same month. In September 2023, Legion M founders Paul Scanlan and Jeff Annison also confirmed their hope for a sequel.
