= Pedometer =

Portable device that counts steps a person takes

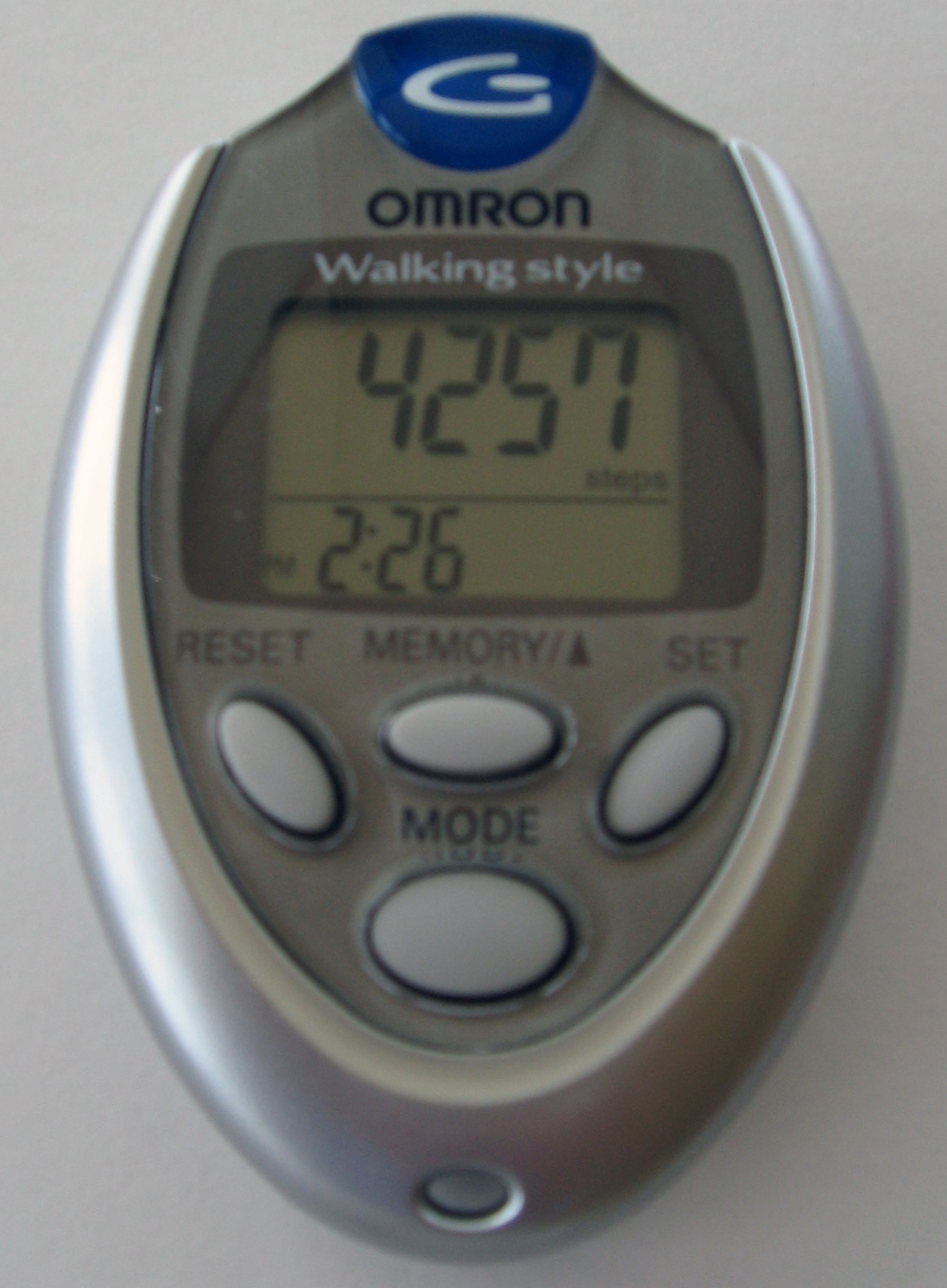
A digital Omron HJ-112 pedometer

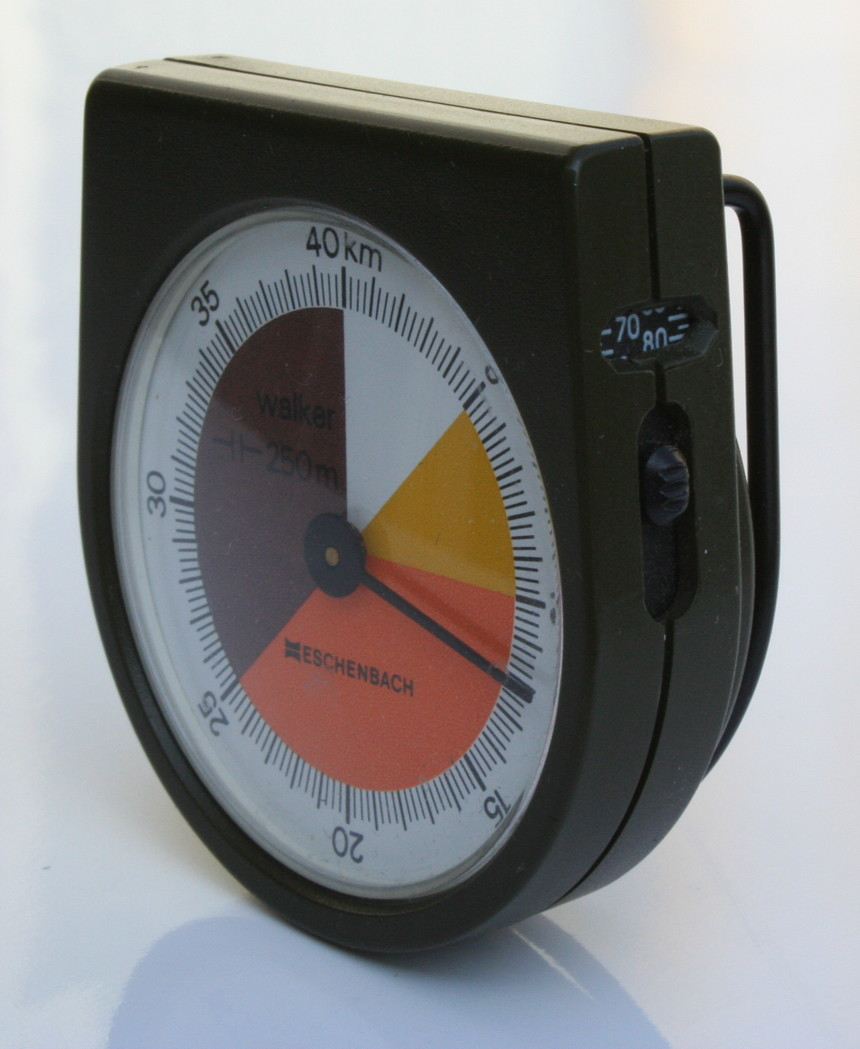
Mechanical pedometer

A pedometer, (from Latin pēs, meaning "foot", and Ancient Greek μέτρον (métron), meaning "measure") or step-counter, is a device, usually portable and electronic or electromechanical, that counts each step a person takes by detecting the motion of the person's hands or hips. Because the distance of each person's step varies, an informal calibration, performed by the user, is required if presentation of the distance covered in a unit of length (such as in kilometers or miles) is desired, though there are now pedometers that use electronics and software to determine how a person's step varies automatically. Distance traveled (by walking or any other means) can be measured directly by a GPS receiver.

Used originally by sports and physical fitness enthusiasts, pedometers are now becoming popular as an everyday exercise counter and motivator. Often worn on the belt and kept on all day, it can record how many steps the wearer has walked that day, and thus the kilometers or miles (distance = number of steps × step length). Some pedometers will also erroneously record movements other than walking, such as bending to tie one's shoes, or road bumps incurred while riding a vehicle, though the most advanced devices record fewer of these 'false steps'. Step counters can give encouragement to compete with oneself in getting fit and losing weight.

A total of 10,000 steps per day, equivalent to 8 kilometres (5.0 mi), is recommended by some to be the benchmark for an active lifestyle. However, this target originated in a marketing campaign by a manufacturer of pedometers, and evidence suggests that most health benefit can be obtained by around 7,000 steps per day. Thirty minutes of moderate walking are equivalent to 3,000-4,000 steps as determined by a pedometer. Step counters are being integrated into an increasing number of portable consumer electronic devices such as music players, smartphones, mobile phones, rings and watches (called activity trackers)

== Usage ==
Pedometers can be a motivation tool for people wanting to increase their physical activity. Various websites exist to allow people to track their progress; however, many will also find entering their daily step count and a heart-beat count onto a calendar to be motivational as well. Clinical studies have shown Pedometers to increase physical activity and reduce blood pressure levels and Body Mass Index. A study published in the Journal of The American Medical Association Nov. 2007 concluded, "The results suggest that the use of a pedometer is associated with significant increases in physical activity and significant decreases in body mass index and blood pressure."

A daily target of 10,000 steps was first proposed. The target has been recommended by the US surgeon general and by the UK Department of Health. The main criticisms of setting a universal target are that it is not achievable for older persons with mobility problems or people with chronic diseases, but on the other hand, the target is probably too low for children.

One criticism of the pedometer is that it does not record intensity, but this can be done by making step goals time limited (for example, 1000 steps in 10 minutes counts as moderate exercise).

== History ==
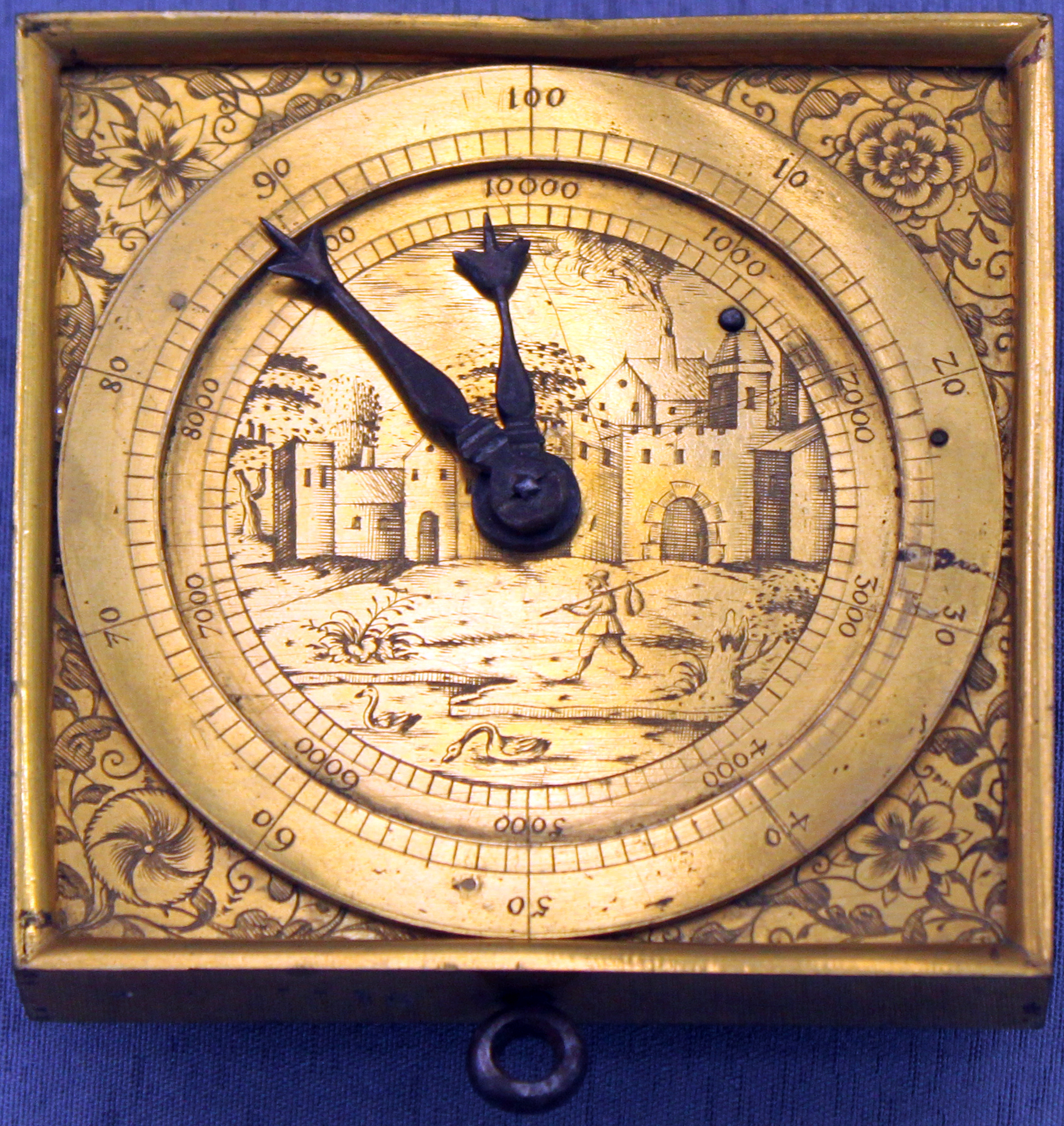
Historical pedometer, Southern Germany, 1590

Leonardo da Vinci (1452–1519) envisioned a mechanical pedometer as a device with military applications. The Germanic National Museum in Nuremberg has a pedometer in its collection from around 1590 (see photo). In 1685 Gottfried Leibniz wrote of his time in France, "...several years ago [1672–1674] I saw for the first time an instrument which, when carried, automatically records the number of steps taken by a pedestrian." In 1780 Abraham-Louis Perrelet of Switzerland created a pedometer, measuring the steps and distance while walking; it was based on a 1770 mechanism of his to power a self-winding watch. A mechanical pedometer obtained from France was introduced in the US by Thomas Jefferson. It is not known if he modified the design; although this pedometer is widely attributed to Jefferson, proof is difficult to obtain as he did not apply for patents on any of his inventions.

=== Japan ===
In 1963, in the lead up to the 1964 Tokyo Olympics, Iwao Ohya, head of one of Tokyo's biggest clinics, told Tokyo engineer Juri Kato of clockmaker Yamasa Tokei Keiki (tokei means clocks and keiki meters) of his concern at the low levels of physical activity in 1960s Japan; the solution, said Ohya, was for everyone to walk 10,000 steps a day. After two years of development, Juri Kato produced the manpokei — the "ten-thousand step-meter".

The impact of the manpokei pedometer was significant. Soon after, the Japan 10,000-step Walking Association sprang up, which shortly had chapters in all 47 prefectures, organising regular walks that could be measured with the Yamasa device.

On 26 February 1980, Juri Kato's son Yasuji Kato filed a pedometer patent with the USPTO, currently assigned to Yamasa Tokei Meter Co Ltd.

In 2015, the Japanese Ministry of Health, Labour and Welfare also recommended 10,000 steps per day. However, this recommendation is not based on solid evidence.

== Technology ==
The technology for a pedometer includes a mechanical sensor and software that counts steps. Early forms used a mechanical switch to detect steps together with a simple counter. If one shakes these devices, one hears a lead ball sliding back and forth, or a pendulum striking stops as it swings. Today advanced step counters rely on MEMS inertial sensors and sophisticated software to detect steps. These MEMS sensors have either 1-, 2- or 3-axis detection of acceleration. The use of MEMS inertial sensors permits more accurate detection of steps and fewer false positives. The software technology used to interpret the output of the inertial sensor and "make sense of accurate steps" varies widely. The problem is compounded by the fact that in modern day-to-day life, such step-counters are expected to count accurately on locations where users frequently carry their devices (attached to the belt, shirt/pants pocket, hand bag, backpack). In recent years more advanced approaches to measure steps have been made with the use of computer vision.

== Accuracy ==
The accuracy of step counters varies widely between devices. Typically, step counters are reasonably accurate at a walking pace on a flat surface if the device is placed in its optimal position (usually vertically on the belt clip). Although traditional step counters are affected dramatically when placed at different angles and locations, recent advances have made them more robust to those non-ideal placements. Still, most step counters falsely count steps when a user is driving a car or makes other habitual motions that the device encounters throughout the day. This error accumulates for users with moderate commutes to work. Accuracy of distance measurement also depends on the user entered step-length.

The best pedometers are accurate to within ± 5% error.

== Integration in personal electronic devices ==
=== Apple products ===
==== Nike+iPod Sport Kit ====
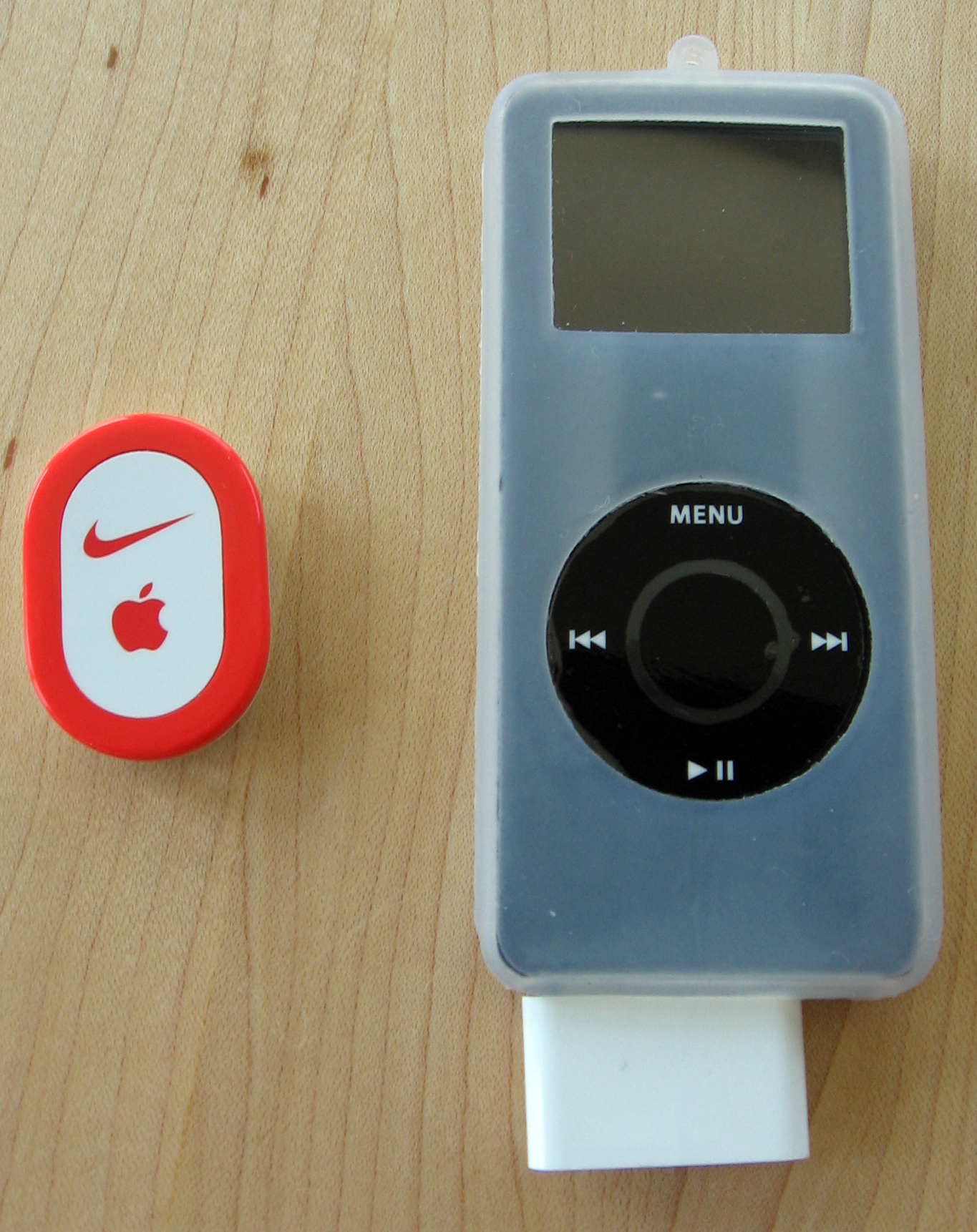
Nike+iPod Sports Kit

Apple and Nike, Inc. introduced the Nike+iPod Sport Kit, which uses a motion sensor that fits into a Nike shoe or in a pocket worn on the laces of other brands of shoes. The sensor communicates with an iPhone (3GS or higher), iPod touch (2nd generation or higher), iPod nano (4th generation or higher), or dedicated adapter to transmit workout information such as elapsed time, distance traveled, and calories burned.

==== Apple iPhone 5s ====
The iPhone 5s was the first iPhone to contain an Apple Motion Coprocessor which was denoted the M7 chip paired with the first 64-bit ARM-based Apple processor, the Apple A7 SoC (System on a Chip). The addition of the separate always on coprocessor allows the main CPU to snooze while it tracks the motion of the phone, through the use of an inertial measurement unit (IMU) consisting of an accelerometer, MEMS gyroscope and digital compass. This means that it will know when the user is jogging or in the car, and can take that information and store it without needing to drain the battery by having the main CPU run. It can retrofit the data to apps downloaded at a later date, meaning any M7-enabled app that uses the new CoreMotion API will be able to give the information on recent training.

==== Apple iPhone 6 ====
The iPhone 6 and 6 Plus contains the next generation of the Apple Motion Coprocessors with the M8 motion coprocessor, this chip was paired with the vastly improved Apple A8 SoC processor and gained the added sensor input of a Bosch Sensortech Barometer allowing the M8 to sense changes in elevation by the change in barometric pressure.

==== Apple iPhone 6s ====
The iPhone 6s and 6s Plus improved the Apple Motion Coprocessors by integrating it into the die of the new Apple A9 SoC processor. This saves space allowing for the reduction of the logic board size as well as reduced power usage within the phone. This chip is also at the heart of the first-generation iPhone SE. A variant of the Apple A9, the Apple A9X also incorporates the M9 processor on-die and drives the Apple iPad Pro.

==== Apple Watch ====
The Apple Watch extended step-counting capability to Apple's first wearable device using the accelerometer and gyroscope integrated in the Apple S1 SIP (System in package). Apple Watch works in parallel with a connected iPhone to improve accuracy of the user's step count.

=== Fitbit ===
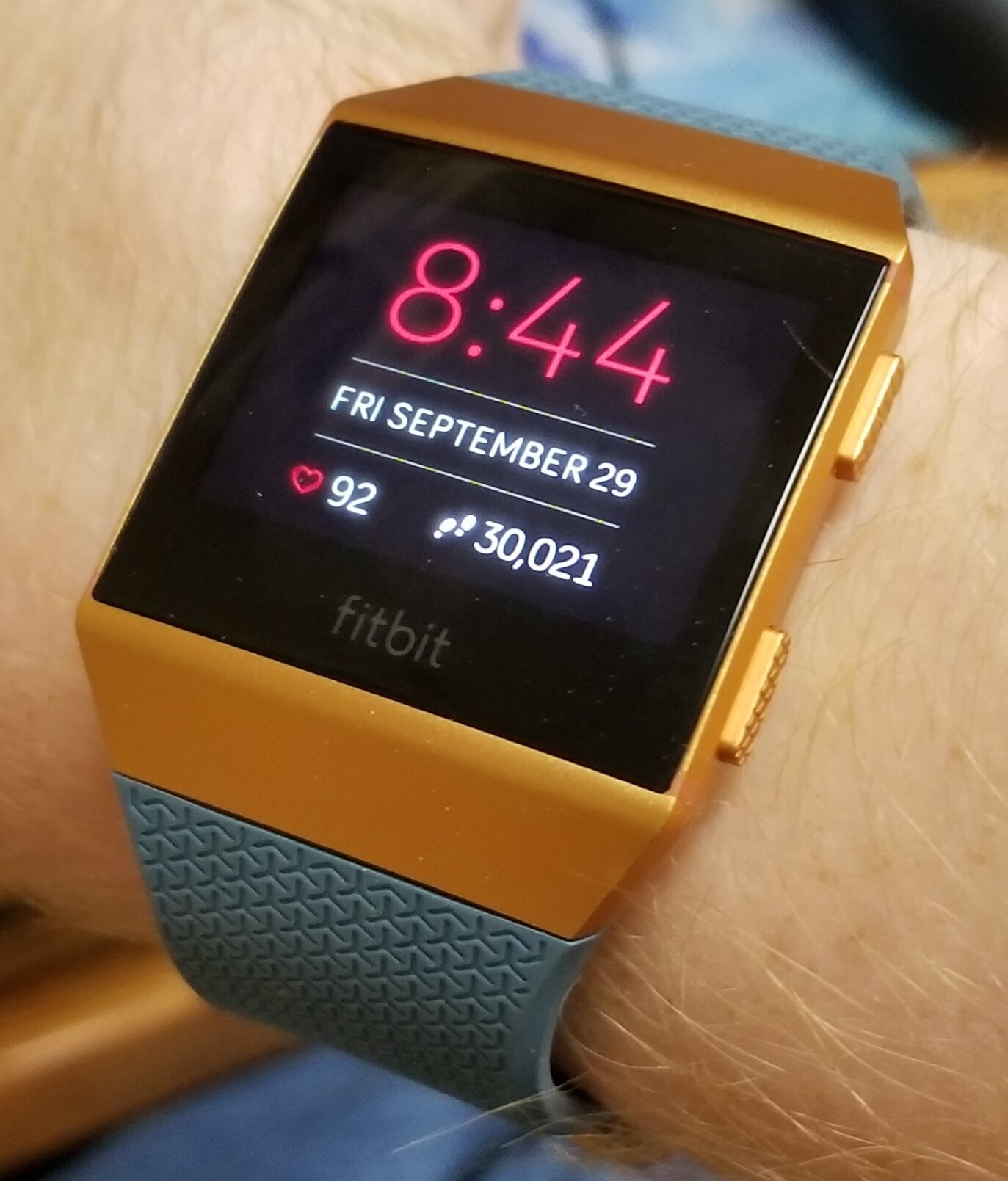
Fitbit Ionic wristwatch from 2017

The Fitbit is an always-on electronic pedometer, that in addition to counting steps also displays distance traveled, altitude climbed (via a number of flights of steps count), calories burned, current intensity, and time of day. Worn in an armband at night, it also purports to measure the length and quality of a user's sleep. Inbuilt is a daily target, of 10,000 steps and 10 flights of stairs. Connected by USB with a computer, the user's data is automatically uploaded and displayed via a web-based profile page, that keeps track of historical data, to which can be added food consumption data. Based on activity users are awarded badges for daily step and climbing targets, as well as 'lifetime' awards for same. In the US and UK users can also download an iOS or Android app for recording and display of data.

Most Fitbit devices estimate distance traveled based on steps counted, the intensity of the steps and the user's profile data (specifically gender and height). Individuals can improve the accuracy of their stride length settings by measuring and calibrating their average stride length. Some higher-end Fitbit models include additional features such as heart rate monitoring and GPS tracking.

=== Pedometers for Smartphones/MP3 players ===
Since most smartphones, iPod Touches and some MP3 players are enhanced with an integrated accelerometer it is possible to introduce pedometer functionality to these devices. This option was successfully realized by a number of smartphone application developers, enabling any fitness-savvy smartphone owner to track the number of steps taken as well as distance travelled and calories used.

=== NTT DoCoMo Fujitsu Pedometer Phone ===
This is the first integrated phone with an always-on pedometer which counts steps like a traditional pedometer. The sensor is made by ADI. This handset was introduced in Japan in 2004 and has sold over 3 million units.

=== Nokia products ===
==== Nokia 5500 Sports Phone ====
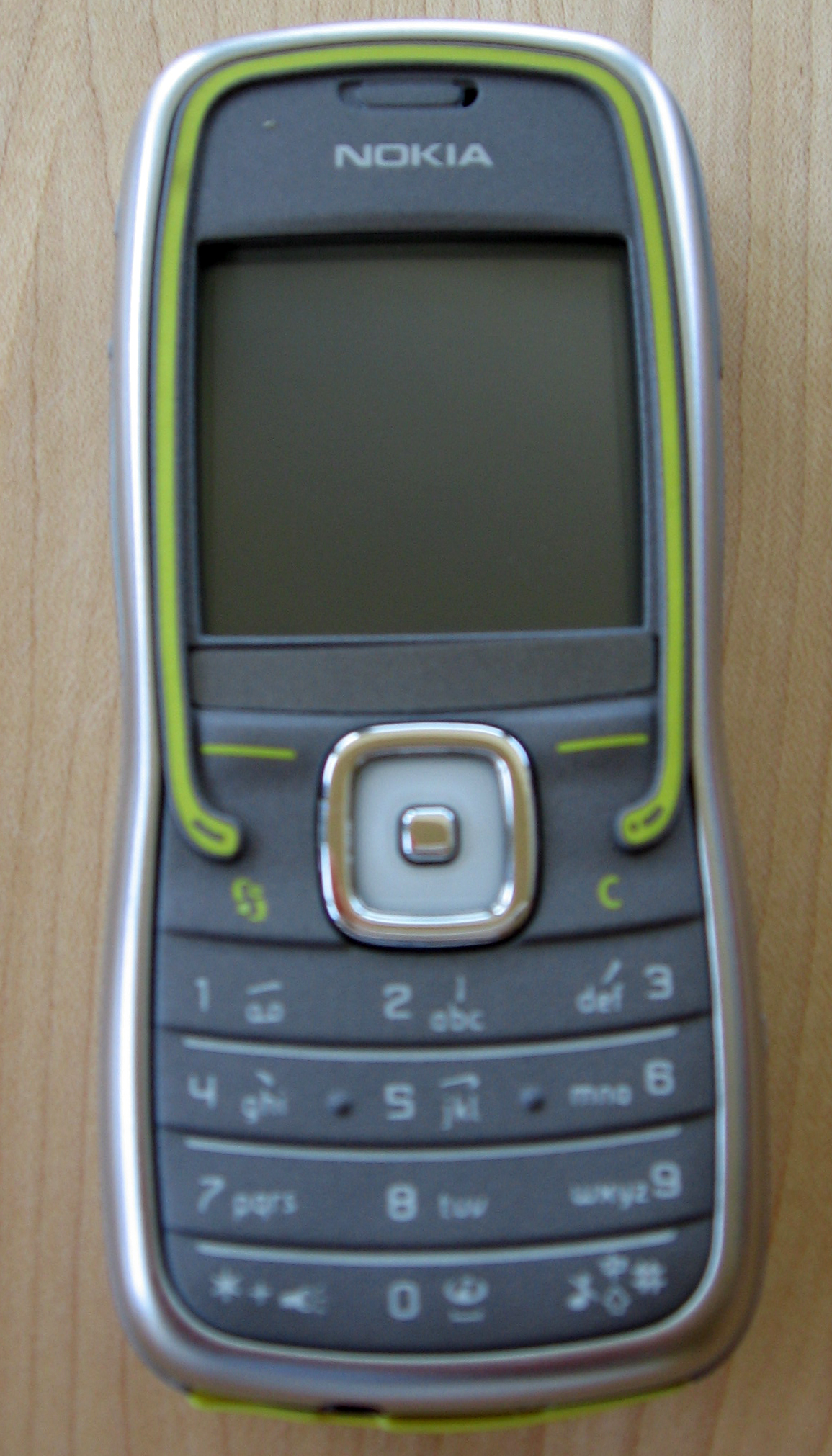
Nokia 5500 Sports Phone

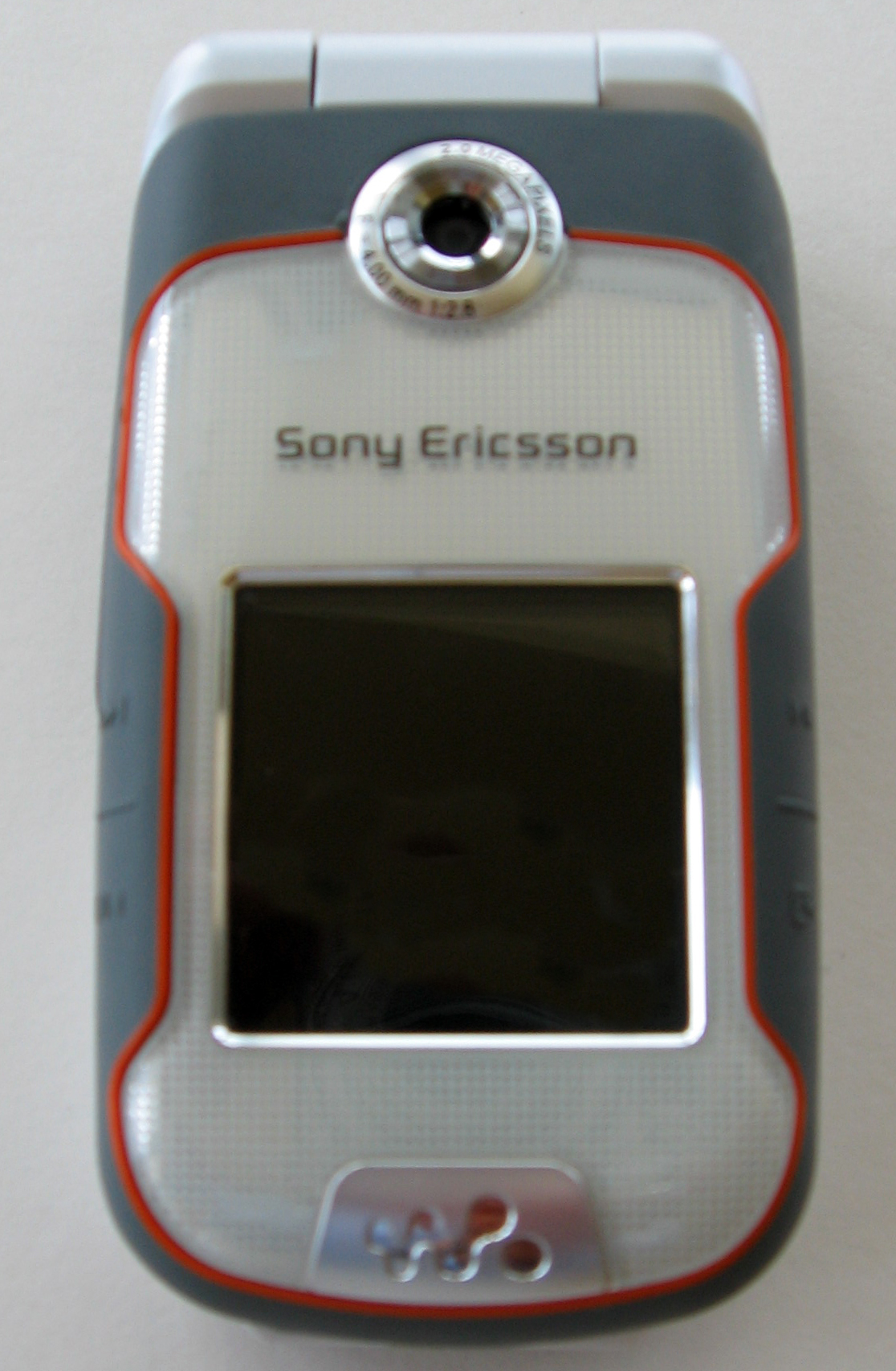
Sony Ericsson W710 walkman phone

The Nokia 5500 Sports Phone uses an embedded 3 axis MEMS inertial sensor to detect the steps a user takes. The pedometer application tracks steps taken, time elapsed and distance traveled. However the application cannot run continuously as it drains the phone's battery and is therefore of limited use.

==== Nokia Sports Tracker ====
Nokia Sports Tracker features pedometer for Nokia Symbian phones with an Accelerometer. Accelerometers are included in phones to save correct orientation on photos and to improve the GPS positioning feature.

==== Nokia Step Counter ====
Nokia Step Counter is a free application available at Nokia Beta Labs which works on a wide range of N-Series Nokia phones. The pedometer application tracks steps taken, time elapsed and distance traveled. This application can be left running all day as it is not a huge drain on the battery.

=== Sony Ericsson W710 Walkman phone, W580 Walkman phone ===
The Sony Ericsson W710 and W580 Walkman phones use embedded 2 axis MEMS inertial sensors to detect the steps a user takes. The W710 is a clamshell phone and displays the user's steps on the external display. The W710 must be closed in order for it to count steps. When the step counter is activated, it counts detected steps during the day, and at midnight it stores the counter in a day-by-day history and resets it to zero.

=== Nintendo Consoles ===
On November 1, 2008, Nintendo released the Nintendo DS title Personal Trainer: Walking (Japanese: 歩いてわかる 生活リズムDS, Aruite Wakaru Seikatsu Rhythm DS), which includes two pedometers. They connect to the game card via infrared signals.

On September 12, 2009, Nintendo released Pokémon HeartGold and SoulSilver in Japan. Each game comes bundled with a device called a Pokéwalker, which functions as a pedometer and allows players to transfer one Pokémon from their game to the Pokéwalker via infrared signals. Unlike the Personal Trainer: Walking pedometers, the Pokéwalker features a small LCD screen and multiple buttons. Walking with the Pokéwalker earns experience points for the Pokémon.

The Nintendo 3DS, released March 27, 2011, features an internal pedometer that counts and records daily step counts while in sleep mode. Every hundred steps earns a Play Coin, which can be spent on a variety of extras and bonuses.

On October 31, 2013, Nintendo released Wii Fit U, which was able to interface with the Fit Meter, which was a pedometer with similar hardware to the Pokéwalker, but instead themed around Wii Fit U and with the ability to store and display the user's Mii. It could be checked into the game via the infrared transceiver on top of the Wii U Gamepad, and could track the altitude of the player while walking.

=== Philips Activa Workout Monitoring MP3 Player ===
Released May 2010, by Philips. This MP3 capable pedometer measures aerobic intensity and matches songs on the playlist to keep the user engaged and motivated.

=== Tractivity ===
Tractivity is a group of health-related services that include a sensor that is worn on a shoe. The Tractivity sensor logs the distance a person walks or runs, the calories burned and the time the person was active, which they can then view on a private web page. Tractivity's online web application provides a graphical experience and motivational resource to encourage people to lead healthier lifestyles. Tractivity accounts for the variation in a walker's or runner's stride length that occurs as pace changes. The sensors wirelessly transfer activity data to a secure server for viewing on an individual's computer.

=== Android ===
Android integrates a step counter with version 4.4 (KitKat).

A device already supporting this sensor is the Nexus 5. Another smartphone is the Samsung Galaxy S5, which features a built-in pedometer that uses the S Health (later renamed to Samsung Health) software to display daily step counts, as well as other fitness information. Most Samsung devices now include this software bundled as standard.
