= White van man =

Stereotypical British independent tradesman

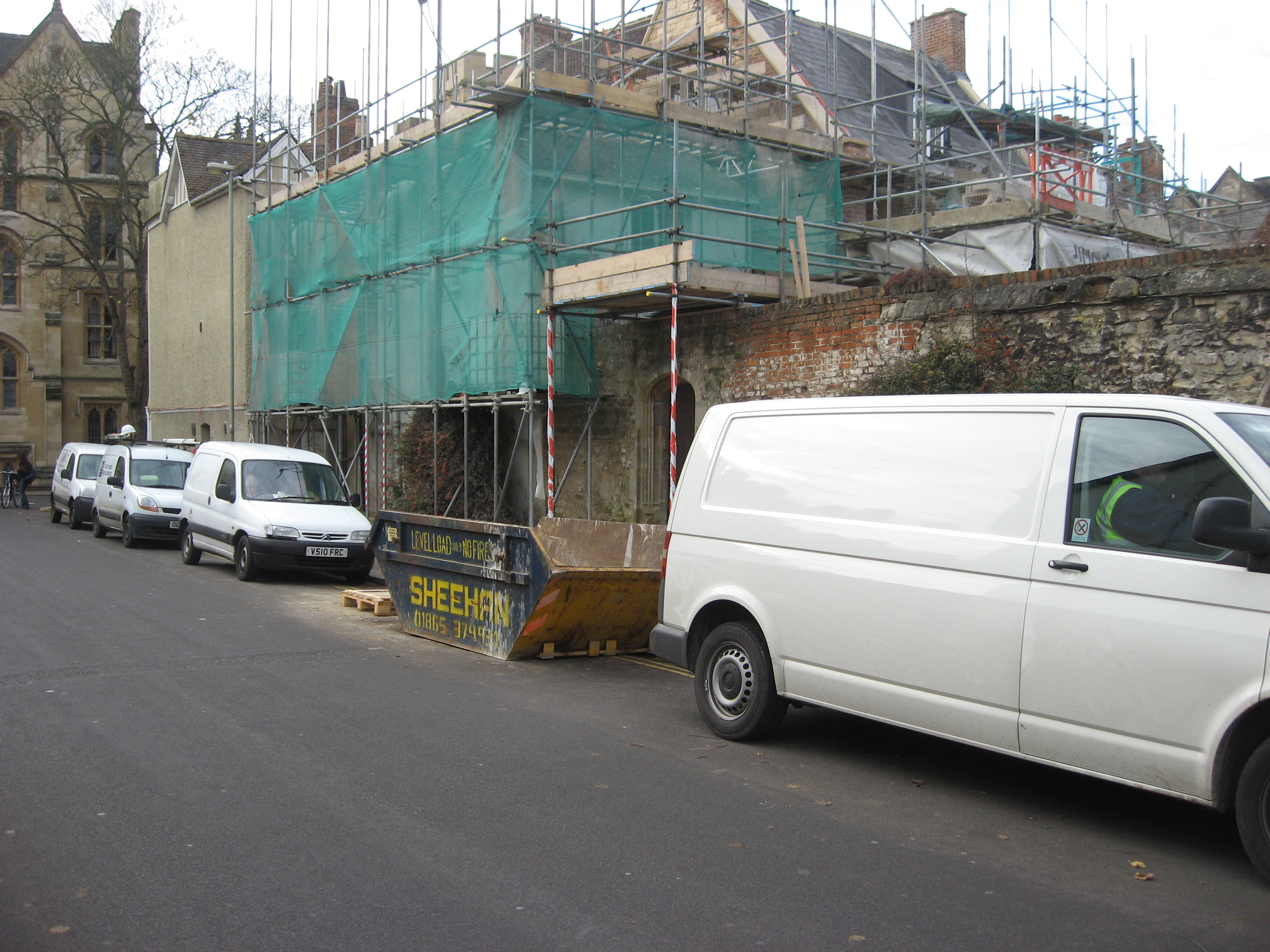
Reconstruction work on Mansfield Road, Oxford, with assorted white vans

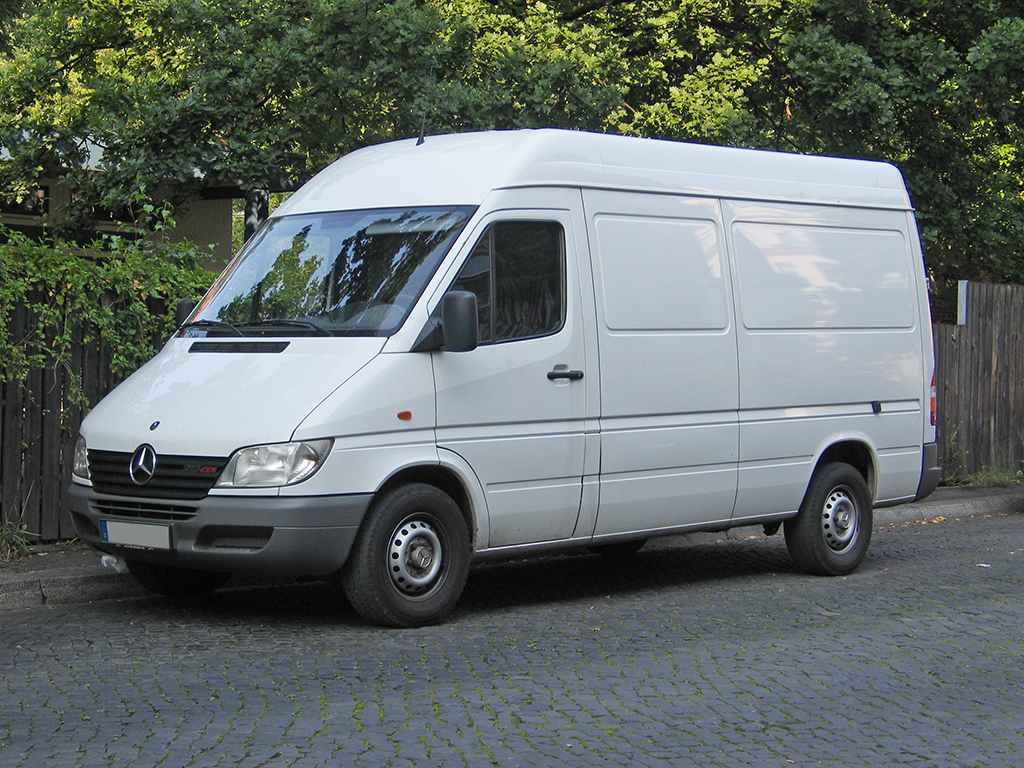
A Mercedes-Benz Sprinter, a typical white van

"White van man" or "a-man-with-a-van" is a stereotype used in the United Kingdom for a Luton van and smaller-sized commercial van driver, typically perceived as a selfish, inconsiderate driver who is mostly petit bourgeois and often aggressive. According to this stereotype, the "white van man" is typically an independent tradesperson, such as a builder, plumber or locksmith, self-employed, or running a small enterprise, for whom driving a commercial vehicle is not their main line of business, as it would be for a professional freight-driver. The "white" refers to the archetypal and most common colour of the van, not the driver himself.

== Usage ==
The first recorded use in the British press was in an article titled "Number is up for White Van Man – scourge of the road." published by The Sunday Times on 18 May 1997 and written by Jonathan Leake, that paper's then-transport editor. Later in 1997, it was used by BBC Radio 2's Sarah Kennedy. She was made honorary president of the First Ford Transit Owner's Club in 2005.

The Sun newspaper ran a regular "White Van Man" column for some years; in the column, the driver of a light goods vehicle was interviewed in his van on the issues of the day. These columns were accompanied by a picture of whichever driver had been interviewed leaning out of his cab.

The term was used in 2010 as part of road safety campaigns by the Freight Transport Association.

== See also ==
- Essex man
- Pickup truck
- The man on the Clapham omnibus
- The Man in the White Van
