= Zolee Griggs =

American actress

- Born: July 30, 1997 (age 28); Los Angeles, California
- Occupation: Actress
- Years active: 2003–present

Zolee Griggs is an American actress. She is best known for playing Shurrie Diggs in the drama series Wu-Tang: An American Saga and Tanisha in the sitcom Cory in the House.

== Early life ==
Griggs was born in Los Angeles, California. She signed with Ford modeling agency at just 2 years old. She was interested in astrology growing up. In high school she blogged about fashion.

== Career ==
One of Griggs earliest roles was playing Tanisha in the sitcom Cory in the House a spinoff of the Disney series That's So Raven. Her first big role came playing in the drama series Wu-Tang: An American Saga based on the life of the legendary rap group Wu-Tang Clan. She played Indigo, one of the lead characters in the superhero movie Archenemy starring Joe Manganiello. She starred alongside Antonio Banderas in the action thriller film The Enforcer.

== Personal life ==
During the COVID-19 pandemic Griggs set up the Inglewood Community Grab & Go which supplied food and supplies to the local community to people who were struggling financially.

== Filmography ==
=== Film ===
| Year | Title | Role | Notes |
|---|---|---|---|
| 2004 | Back When We Were Grownups | LaTeesha | |
| 2005 | Soccer Moms | Molly | |
| 2009 | Bride Wars | Voice | |
| 2018 | Public Disturbance | Alison Black | |
| 2019 | Bit | Izzy | |
| 2020 | Archenemy | Indigo | |
| 2022 | The Enforcer | Billie | |
| 2023 | The Chrononaut | Mission Control | Short |
| 2024 | Deep Tish | Ashanti | Short |
| 2025 | Captain Zero: Into the Abyss Part II | Daisy Kiongozi | Short |
| 2025 | Money Talks | Cleopatra | Short |
| 2024 | Captain Zero: The Movie | Daisy Kiongozi | Pre Production |

=== Television ===
| Year | Title | Role | Notes |
|---|---|---|---|
| 2003 | Strong Medicine | Amber | Episode; Skin |
| 2007-2008 | Cory in the House | Tanisha | 8 episodes |
| 2016 | Adam Ruins Everything | Fallon | 3 episodes |
| 2018 | Ballers | Emma | Episode; No Small Talk |
| 2020 | Boomerang | Luna | 2 episodes |
| 2019-2023 | Wu-Tang: An American Saga | Shurrie Diggs | 30 episodes |
| 2024 | Elsbeth | Sissy | Episode; Devil's Night |
