= Guess Who (film) =

2005 film by Kevin Rodney Sullivan

- Theatrical release poster
- Directed by: Kevin Rodney Sullivan
- Screenplay by: David Ronn; Jay Scherick; Peter Tolan
- Story by: David Ronn; Jay Scherick
- Based on: Guess Who's Coming to Dinner by William Rose
- Produced by: Jenno Topping; Erwin Stoff; Jason Goldberg
- Starring: Bernie Mac; Ashton Kutcher; Zoë Saldaña; Judith Scott
- Cinematography: Karl Walter Lindenlaub
- Edited by: Paul Seydor
- Music by: John Murphy
- Production companies: Columbia Pictures; Regency Enterprises; 3 Arts Entertainment; Tall Trees Productions; Katalyst Media
- Distributed by: Sony Pictures Releasing
- Release date: March 25, 2005
- Running time: 105 minutes
- Country: United States
- Language: English
- Budget: $35 million
- Box office: $103 million

Guess Who is a 2005 American romantic comedy film directed by Kevin Rodney Sullivan, and starring Bernie Mac, Ashton Kutcher, Zoë Saldaña and Judith Scott. The majority of the film was shot in Cranford, New Jersey.

A remake of the 1967 film Guess Who's Coming to Dinner, the film follows a white man meeting the parents of his black fiancée.

Guess Who was released in the United States on March 25, 2005 by Sony Pictures Releasing. The film received mixed reviews from critics and grossed $103 million against a $35 million budget.

== Plot ==
Theresa Jones takes her boyfriend Simon Green to her parents' home to meet them on their 25th wedding anniversary. There she also plans to reveal that the couple are engaged. However, Theresa has neglected to mention that Simon is white.

Theresa's father Percy dislikes Simon almost immediately not only because of his race, but also because he lies to him about being on the NASCAR pit crew for Jeff Gordon, not realizing that Percy is one of Gordon's biggest fans. Percy's wife Marilyn however does likes Simon when they first meet. Percy also happens to stumble on Simon jokingly wearing Theresa's lingerie while they are playing around in her childhood bedroom. None of this helps endear Simon to Percy.

After catching Theresa and Simon in the bedroom, Percy tries to force Simon into a hotel. However, all the hotels in town are booked. Instead, Percy allows Simon to sleep in his basement on the sofa-bed, where Percy also sleeps so he can keep an eye on him, even though the mattress hurts his back.

With the help of his personal assistant Reggie, Percy tries to learn as much information about Simon as he can. He also describes her partner as the ideal black boyfriend for Theresa instead of revealing her boyfriend is white. Reggie manages to convince Simon to reveal that he lied about being a NASCAR pit crew member and also that he needs a $50,000 loan.

Simon discovers Percy's lies just as Reggie reveals that Simon quit his job. Immediately, Percy goes to tell Theresa this new information; however, Simon insists he was not fired and instead quit. Furious that he did not tell her the truth, Theresa leaves. Percy's spying and plagiarism of his vows temporarily strains his relationship with Marilyn.

The next morning, Percy and Simon find Marilyn and Theresa at Marilyn's sister's house to apologize. While Marilyn and Percy reconcile, Simon and Theresa break up and he leaves.

On the day of the anniversary, Theresa tells her father that she and Simon were intending to marry. After wondering why a man intending to get married would quit his job, Percy realizes that Simon quit his job due to his boss' disapproval of interracial relationships. He pursues Simon and brings him back to Theresa, where they reconcile at the anniversary party.

== Cast ==
- Bernie Mac as Percy Jones
- Ashton Kutcher as Simon Green, Theresa's boyfriend
- Zoë Saldaña as Theresa Jones, Percy & Marilyn's daughter and Simon's girlfriend
- Judith Scott as Marilyn Jones, Percy's wife
- Hal Williams as Howard Jones, Percy's father
- Kellee Stewart as Keisha Jones, Percy & Marilyn's younger daughter
- Lawrence Hilton-Jacobs as Joseph Jones
- Sherri Shepherd as Sydney
- Robert Curtis Brown as Dante
- RonReaco Lee as Reggie
- Phil Reeves as Fred
- Nicole Sullivan as Liz Klein
- Jessica Cauffiel as Polly
- Niecy Nash as Naomi
- Kimberly Scott as Kimdra
- Denise Dowse as Lisa
- J. Kenneth Campbell as Nathan Rogers
- Richard Lawson as Marcus
- Mike Epps as Cab Driver
- David Krumholtz as Jerry MacNamara, Percy's co-worker

== Production ==
The film's working title was The Dinner Party. At one point, Harold Ramis was slated to direct.

== Reception ==
=== Box office ===
Guess Who grossed $68.9 million in the United States and Canada, and $34.2 million in other territories, for a worldwide total of $103 million, against a production budget of $35 million.

The film made $20.7 million in its opening weekend, finishing first. It then made $12.7 million in its second weekend and $7.8 million in its third, finishing in third and fourth, respectively.

=== Critical response ===
On the review aggregator website Rotten Tomatoes, 41% of 150 critics' reviews are positive, with an average rating of 5.4/10. The website's consensus reads: "Despite the chemistry of its stars, Guess Who, a loose remake of Guess Who's Coming to Dinner, lacks the political relevance of the original." Metacritic, which uses a weighted average, assigned the film a score of 49 out of 100, based on 34 critics, indicating "mixed or average" reviews. Audiences polled by CinemaScore gave the film an average grade of "B+" on an A+ to F scale.

USA Today said of the film, "A succession of tired race jokes made worse by the bad comedic timing of the bland, under-talented Ashton Kutcher", The Wall Street Journal said, "Guess Who is, impurely and simply, a comic premise borrowed, turned around and dumbed down to the level of sketch or sub-sketch humour" and Rolling Stone said, "Guess what? It's almost bearable".

More positive reviews included The Baltimore Sun, which said, "The movie's sweetness, wit and charm go beyond its can't-we-all-just-get-along premise".

== See also ==
- Something New
