= Judith Scott (American actress) =

American actress

- Born: Fort Bragg, North Carolina, North Carolina, U.S.
- Education: Webster College
- Years active: 1987–present

Judith Scott (born 22 Dec 1965) is an American actress known for her roles in L.A. Doctors, Jake 2.0, and Dexter, and for her years with the Second City theatre troupe, both in Chicago and Toronto.

== Early life and career ==
Born Judith Spears on Dec 22, 1965, in Fort Bragg, North Carolina, Scott is the eldest of three children born to Henrietta Eleanor (née Evans) and Julian Herbert Spears, then an officer in the United States Army Special Forces. Reflecting her father's respective reassignments, the family's address shifted frequently during Scott's pre-school years, encompassing North Carolina, Georgia, Kentucky, and even Germany. Well before her 6th birthday, however, her parents divorced, and, along with her siblings and mother, she moved to Oak Ridge, Tennessee, where, by September 1971, the former Miss Evans had become Mrs. Marvin Scott. Six years in Tennessee were followed by moves to Delaware, and, finally, to Illinois, where, following her brief attendance at Webster College and an unfulfilling one-year expedition to Paris, Scott finally found what she had been searching for in the form of Chicago's Second City (stumbled upon after exiting a nearby restroom).

I heard people laughing and decided to poke my head in. I said to myself, 'How do I get a piece of this? I want in on this party.' [...] The theater, particularly Second City, was grad school for me. I learned a lot of life lessons out of that place.

Scott portrayed Dr. Rose Kent on Season 1 of 24. She played a recurring role as Dr. Jenna Williams on the series CSI: Crime Scene Investigation. She portrayed Esmee Pascal on the Showtime series Dexter. She has guest-starred on Numbers, Family Law, Judging Amy, The X-Files, Frasier, Crossing Jordan, House, Forever Knight and many other series. She has also appeared in feature films such as the 1994 The Santa Clause movie starring Tim Allen, Guess Who, Fracture, and Flightplan. She played Claudia in FX's Snowfall. Her upcoming projects include Geechee.

== Filmography ==
=== Film ===
| Year | Title | Role | Notes |
|---|---|---|---|
| 1990 | Opportunity Knocks | Milt's Secretary | |
| 1994 | Boulevard | Sheila | |
| 1994 | The Santa Clause | Susan Perry | |
| 1995 | No Contest | Nancy Polson | |
| 1995 | Soul Survivor | Annie | |
| 1996 | Dunston Checks In | Nancy | |
| 2003 | Vampires Anonymous | Christine | |
| 2005 | Guess Who | Marilyn Jones | |
| 2005 | Flightplan | Estella | |
| 2007 | Fracture | Resident | |
| 2009 | Ingenious | Rita | |
| 2012 | The Longer Day of Happiness | Lisa Jones | |
| 2017 | Kings | Woman in Panties | |
| 2018 | Blue | Dr. Diane Carol | |
| 2020 | Bad Hair | Edna | |
| 2021 | The Little Things | Marsha | |
| TBA | Geechee | TBA | |

=== Television ===
| Year | Title | Role | Notes |
|---|---|---|---|
| 1991 | Hammerman | Additional Voices | —N/a |
| 1992 | Top Cops | Neta Weston | Episode: "Robert Dwyer/Neta Weston/Bruce Hanson" |
| 1992 | E.N.G. | Mary Graves | Episode: "The Sleep of Reason" |
| 1993 | Matrix | Esther | Episode: "Love Kills" |
| 1994 | Race to Freedom: The Underground Railroad | Mrs. Brown | Television film |
| 1994 | RoboCop | Dr. Janet Bailey | Episode: "What Money Can't Buy" |
| 1994 | Due South | Head Nurse | Episode: "Manhunt" |
| 1994 | Against Their Will | Breeze | Television film |
| 1995 | Friends at Last | Fanny's Lawyer | Television film |
| 1995 | Forever Knight | Carol Lewis | Episode: "Curiouser and Curiouser" |
| 1995 | The Preston Episodes | Kelly Freeman / Jelly Freeman | 5 episodes |
| 1996 | Living Single | Karen O'Neal | Episode: "The Engagement: Part 1" |
| 1997 | A Nightmare Come True | Gretchen | Television film |
| 1998 | A Wing and a Prayer | Harriet | Television film |
| 1998 | Murder at 75 Birch | Detective Carter | Television film |
| 1998 | The Wonderful World of Disney | Coop | Episode: "Murder She Purred: A Mrs. Murphy Mystery" |
| 1998–1999 | L.A. Doctors | Nina | 10 episodes |
| 1999–2000 | Get Real | Dr. Prendergast | 2 episodes |
| 2000 | Judging Amy | Mara Roberts | Episode: "Gray vs. Gray" |
| 2000–2001 | CSI: Crime Scene Investigation | Dr. Jenna Williams | 6 episodes |
| 2001 | FreakyLinks | Natalie Tatum | Episode: "Subject: The Stone Room" |
| 2001 | The X-Files | Dr. Kai Bowe | Episode: "Medusa" |
| 2001 | Crossing Jordan | FBI Agent Annie Larrabee / Jenny | Episode: "Born to Run" |
| 2002 | The Bernie Mac Show | Patricia | Episode: "Wanda's Week Off" |
| 2002 | 24 | Dr. Rose Kent | Episode: "1:00 p.m.-2:00 p.m." |
| 2002 | The Guardian | Sylvia Doucette | Episode: "Lawyers, Guns and Money" |
| 2002 | Frasier | Colleen | Episode: "Rooms with a View" |
| 2003 | Oliver Beene | Wanda Gilbert | Episode: "Space Race" |
| 2003–2004 | Jake 2.0 | Lou Beckett | 16 episodes |
| 2004 | Without a Trace | Gail O'Neill | Episode: "The Season" |
| 2006 | Criminal Minds | Det. Charlotte Russet | Episode: "What Fresh Hell?" |
| 2006 | Monk | Principal Franklin | Episode: "Mr. Monk and the Big Game" |
| 2006 | ER | Mandy Smith | Episode: "Heart of the Matter" |
| 2006 | Cold Case | Cherise Pierce | Episode: "Fireflies" |
| 2006–2007 | Dexter | Lt. Esmee Pascal | 5 episodes |
| 2007 | Close to Home | Alexi Rogers | Episode: "Getting in" |
| 2007 | Shark | Dr. Laura Fields | Episode: "Dr. Laura" |
| 2008 | Numbers | Judy Turner | Episode: "Breaking Point" |
| 2008 | One Tree Hill | Adoption Worker | Episode: "Echoes, Silence, Patience and Grace" |
| 2008 | Lincoln Heights | Anita Kingston | 3 episodes |
| 2008 | The Cleaner | Sasha / Rehab Administrator | 2 episodes |
| 2009 | House | Dana Miller | Episode: "The Greater Good" |
| 2009 | Hawthorne | Karen Schilling | Episode: "Trust Me" |
| 2009 | Tyler Perry's House of Payne | Prudence | Episode: "Till Payne Do We Part" |
| 2010 | Detroit 1-8-7 | Jill Roberts | Episode: "Royal Bubbles/Needle Drop" |
| 2011 | Necessary Roughness | Judy Lang | Episode: "Forget Me Not" |
| 2011–2012 | Castle | Evelyn Montgomery | 3 episodes |
| 2012 | CSI: Miami | Ellen Phillips | Episode: "Habeas Corpse" |
| 2012 | Franklin & Bash | BodyView's Attorney | Episode: "Last Dance" |
| 2016 | Murder in the First | Regina Parker | Episode: "Normandy Bitch" |
| 2017 | How to Get Away with Murder | Barham | Episode: "I Love Her" |
| 2017–2019 | Snowfall | Claudia Crane | 11 episodes |
| 2018 | The Arrangement | Delia Clark | Episode: "On Location" |
| 2018–2020 | All American | Janelle Cooper | 6 episodes |
| 2019 | Surveillance | Claire Reynolds | Television film |
| 2022 | From Scratch | Maxine | |
| 2025 | Gen V | Pam | Episode: "H is for Human" |
