= Geechee (film) =

- Directed by: DuBois Ashong
- Written by: DuBois Ashong
- Produced by: Jamie Foxx; Stuart Ford; Glendon Palmer; Datari Turner
- Starring: Andrea Riseborough; Ebon Moss-Bachrach; Amin Joseph; Gavin Warren
- Cinematography: Isiah Donté Lee
- Production companies: AGC Studios; Ingenious Media
- Distributed by: STXfilms
- Country: United States
- Language: English

Geechee is an unfinished American supernatural thriller film written and directed by DuBois Ashong. The film would star Andrea Riseborough, Ebon Moss-Bachrach, Amin Joseph, and Gavin Warren, with Jamie Foxx serving as a producer.

Filming began in August 2020, but was halted in September when a crew member was injured after the crew's convoy was fired upon several times by Dominican police due to a mistaken identity.

== Cast ==
- Andrea Riseborough as Wren
- Amin Joseph
- Ebon Moss-Bachrach
- Antoinette Crowe-Legacy as Tracey
- Gavin Warren as Axel
- Victoria Hill
- Starletta DuPois
- Judith Scott

== Production ==
In November 2019, it was announced Andrea Riseborough had joined the cast of the film, with DuBois Ahsong directing from a screenplay he wrote. In August 2020, Andrea Riseborough, Amin Joseph, Ebon Moss-Bachrach, Antoinette Crowe-Legacy, Gavin Warren, Victoria Hill, Starletta DuPois and Judith Scott joined the cast of the film, with Jamie Foxx serving as a producer.

=== Filming ===
Principal photography began in the Dominican Republic in August 2020. Production was initially set to begin in March 2020, but was delayed due to the COVID-19 pandemic. In September, production was halted indefinitely when a crew member was injured after the crew's convoy was fired upon several times by Dominican police. Apparently, the incident took place due to a case of mistaken identity.
