= Bit (film) =

2019 vampire film

- Directed by: Brad Michael Elmore
- Written by: Brad Michael Elmore
- Cinematography: Cristina Dunlap
- Music by: Wolfmen of Mars
- Distributed by: Vertical Entertainment
- Release dates: May 24, 2019 (Inside Out); April 24, 2020
- Running time: 90 minutes

Bit is a 2019 vampire film written and directed by Brad Michael Elmore. The film stars Nicole Maines as Laurel, a girl who is turned into a vampire while spending the summer with her brother.

== Plot ==
A vampire woman takes her human boyfriend to her home, explaining to him how vampires operate. Planning to start a new life with him, the vampire woman turns her boyfriend into a vampire as well. However, they are attacked by the woman's all-female coven, led by their matriarch, Duke. Duke kills the man in front of his lover, stating her decree they will not have men in their ranks, before locking the woman away as punishment.

Eighteen year old trans woman Laurel (Nicole Maines), moves to Los Angeles after graduating high school, looking to make a fresh start after transitioning. She moves in with her brother, Mark (James Paxton), whom she has not been close to in years. On her first night in the city, Laurel and Mark go for a night on the town, where Laurel ends up attending a club run by Duke. There Laurel meets a young music video director, Izzy (Zolee Griggs), a member of Duke's vampire posse, and Duke herself, who form a fixation on Laurel. Izzy invites Laurel to a party, where they are being followed by an older man, while Duke lures two men to feed off of, revealing one to be a rapist she is hunting.

During her stay, Izzy, bites and turns Laurel, while Duke reveals to Laurel what they are. Duke tosses Laurel off their club's roof with the offer of being part of her coven; Laurel survives, but is in a haze the next morning, and unable to consume regular food, to Mark's concern. Duke and her gang later arrive at Laurel and Mark's house, taking Laurel to explain themselves. Duke explains how she uses her gang to punish the deserving and empower women with turning men being forbidden. Duke tries to get Laurel to embrace the change and kill one of many vampire hunters after her group, but a terrified Laurel flees. The group is attacked by the rest of the hunters, their leader killing the others according to his "master's" wishes, demanding said master's release. Laurel, overhearing the attack, kills the lead hunter, saving the group and embracing her change.

Afterwards, Laurel learns of Duke's past; as a young woman, Duke was a runaway decades ago, becoming a prostitute and party girl; Duke would end up meeting Vlad, a vampire master and playboy, who took over Duke's mind, turning her into one of his many vampire sex slaves for decades. Duke gained her control back when Vlad was attacked by his enemies, seemingly destroying him, but Vlad was still alive through his still beating, indestructible heart. It is through this heart, Vlad not only controls vampire hunters to try to free him, but Duke feeds off the heart to gain some of Vlad's power. The experience taught Duke that men could not be trusted with the power Vlad had.

After Duke woos her, Laurel ends up joining the coven. After seeing the extermination of the remaining vampire hunters, Laurel gets swept into the vampires lifestyle and becomes an item with Izzy. Despite this, Laurel does find her morals conflicting with Duke's; it is at this time, Laurel learns of one of Vlad's loyal brides, who is imprisoned beneath the club (said bride was the woman Duke locked up in the film's opening). Laurel finds herself becoming increasingly conflicted about being a vampire, especially as she becomes distant from Mark and her family. This has also led to Laurel's refusal to feed. Laurel and Duke start to become hostile, when Duke kills a woman that Laurel refuses to.

When Laurel returns home, she learns a friend of hers attempted suicide, and gets into an argument with Mark about how she has been neglecting her friends and family, and the effect it has on them. An emotionally devastated and blood starved Laurel attacks and bites Mark, causing him to slowly turn into a vampire. Terrified, Laurel goes to Duke's group for help, where Duke plans to kill Mark in accordance with her rules. Backed into a corner, Laurel frees Vlad's bride to distract Duke; in turn, the bride frees Vlad himself, who immediately drains her. Vlad takes control of the girls, and reveals that Duke has been using his power to manipulate the girls into taking more ruthless actions, and berates Duke for being ungrateful towards him. Vlad intends to regain his former power after killing Duke, but Laurel stands up to Vlad, setting him on fire. Laurel then leads the other girls into destroying Vlad's body.

Duke tries to take her heart back, but Laurel snatches it away. Deciding that Duke has become what she preached against, the other girls turn against her for Laurel, locking Duke in her own prison for the time being. With Laurel taking control of the coven, she conscripts Mark into the life of a vampire and apologizes for her toxic behavior and neglect. Laurel decides to share the power Duke would not, leading the vampires in feeding on Vlad's heart, beginning a more fair leadership.

== Cast ==
- Nicole Maines as Laurel
- Diana Hopper as Duke
- James Paxton as Mark, Laurel's brother
- M. C. Gainey as Enoch
- Jimmy Jagger as Cody
- Zolee Griggs as Izzy
- Greg Hall as Vlad
- Friday Chamberlain as Roya
- Char Diaz as Frog

== Reception ==
On review aggregator website Rotten Tomatoes, the film holds an approval rating of 91% based on 11 critical reviews, and an average rating of 7.2/10.

According to Variety, it "flirts with various identification points (trans, lesbian, feminist) without making much of them, beyond the automatic cred that placing an LGBTQ stamp on genre tropes will mean for some viewers."
