= Sony Ericsson W710 =

Mobile phone model

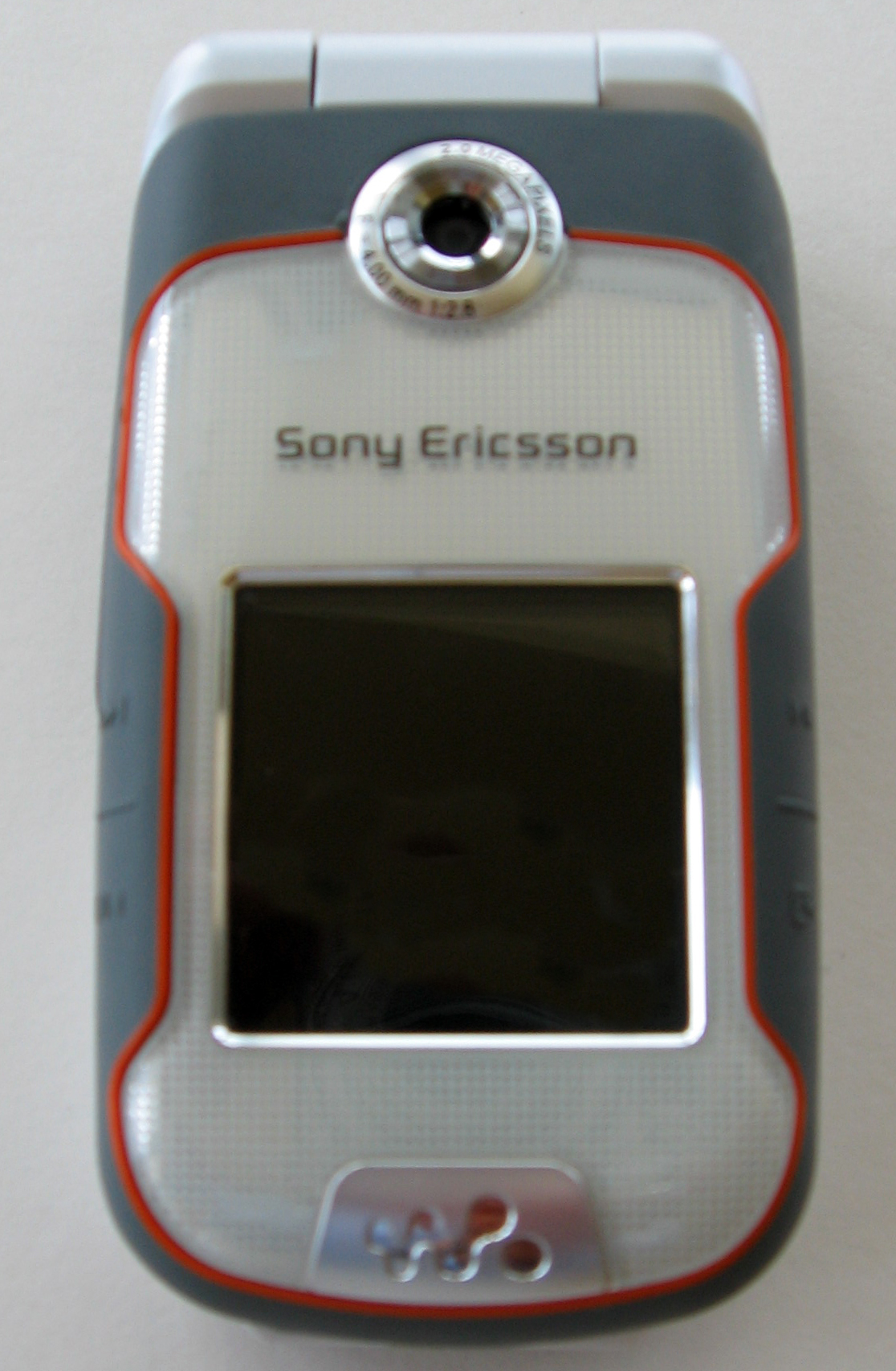
- Related: Sony Ericsson Z710
- Dimensions: 88 mm × 48 mm × 24.5 mm (3.46 in × 1.89 in × 0.96 in)
- Weight: 101 g (3.6 oz)
- Memory: 10 MB internal, 1 Memory Stick Micro (M2) slot, 512 MB Memory Stick Micro included in box networks = GSM 850, GSM 900, GSM 1800, GSM 1900
- Display: 176x220 pixels, 262,144 Color TFT LCD
- Connectivity: EDGE, GPRS, HSCSD, Bluetooth v2.0, IrDA, USB 2

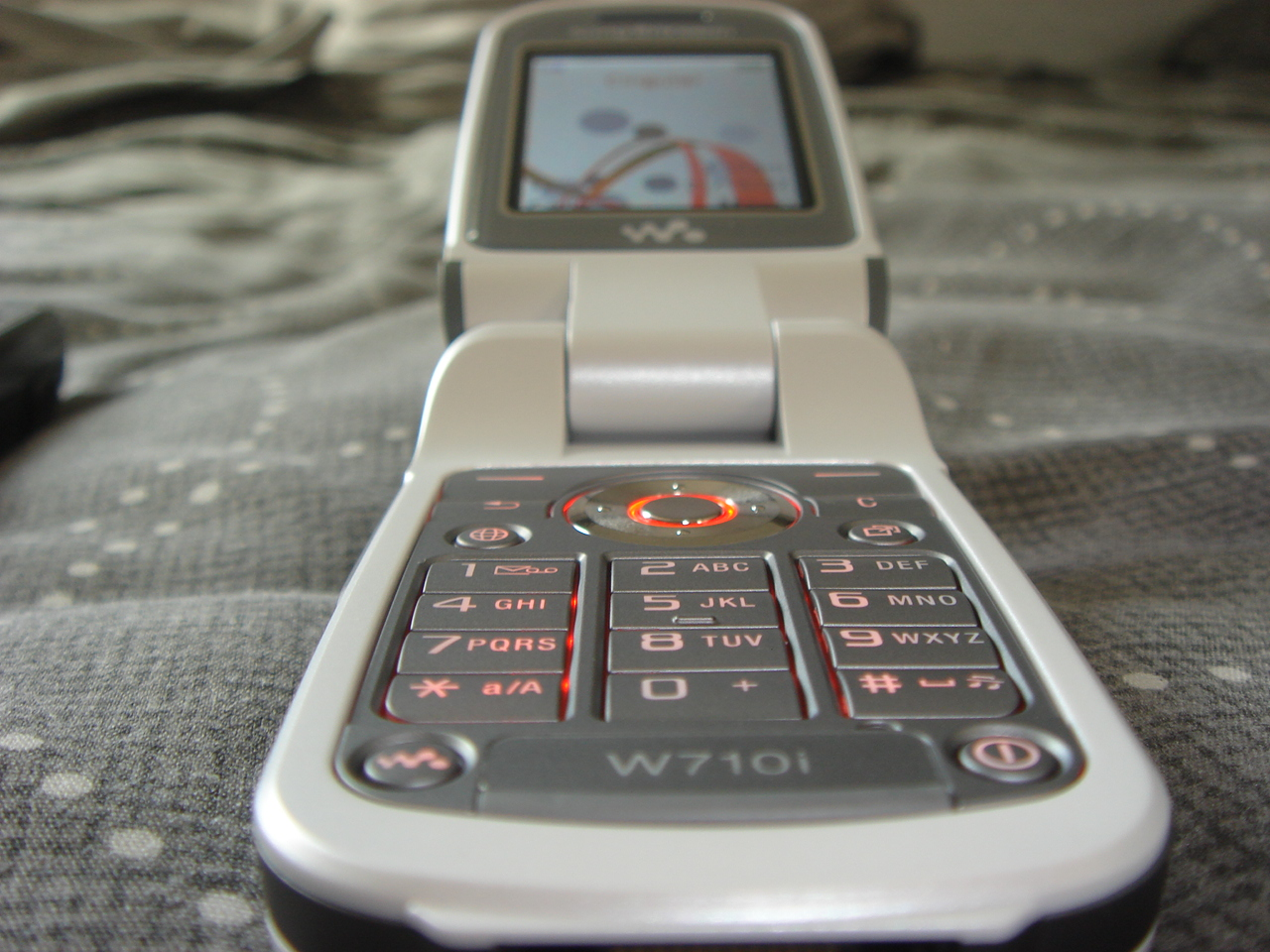

W710 is a mobile phone produced by Sony Ericsson.

The W710 was announced on May 18, 2006. It is one of two clamshell Walkman-brand phones, and shares many characteristics of the Z710. The W710 is a quad-band EDGE phone.

Other features include a web browser, 2 MP digital camera, Memory Stick Micro (M2) slot, special functions for fitness and running, and a flight mode where cell phone functions are turned off. This allows for use of the Walkman, FM radio, and organizer functions in no cell-phone areas. The phone supports MP3, AAC, AAC+, and eAAC audio and MPEG4 and 3GPP video media formats.

The generic W710 is white with gray rubber and orange trim. There is also a version with purple rubber trim.

== Key features ==
- Dual Screens
- 2-megapixel camera with 2.5 x zoom
- Walkman Music Player
- FM Radio
- 3GP/MP4 Player
- Bluetooth Technology
- Quad Band Technology (GSM 850, GSM 900, GSM 1800 & GSM 1900)
- Fitness Applications

== Variants ==
- W710i - Primarily for the European and North American markets.
- W710c - For the Chinese market.

== Sony Ericsson W710i specifications ==
- Screen
  - Internal 262k TFT Color Screen (176 x 220 Pixels)
  - External STN 4 Greyscale Screen (128 x 128 Pixels)
- Imaging
  - 2 Megapixel Camera
  - 2.5 x Digital Zoom
  - Video Clip
  - Video Record
  - Video Streaming
  - Digital Camera Menu
  - Macromedia Flash Lite
  - Picture Editor
  - Picture Effects
  - Picture Phone Book
  - Picture Wallpaper
  - SVG Tiny 1.1
  - Image Blogging
  - Screensaver
  - Themes Display
  - VideoDJ
  - Viewfinder Display
  - Wallpaper Animation
- Messaging
  - SMS (Text Messaging)
  - MMS (Multimedia Messaging)
  - SMS Long
  - MMS Video
  - Email
  - Push Email
  - Predictive Text
  - Sound Recorder
- Sound
  - Walkman Music Player
  - Media Player
  - FM Radio RDS
  - Music Tones (MP3 & AAC)
  - Polyphonic Ringtones (16 Voice)
  - Polyphonic Sound (72 Voice)
  - MusicDJ
  - PlayNow
  - Mega Bass
  - Music Mode
- Entertainment
  - 3D Games
  - Java Games
  - Embedded Games
  - Downloadable Games
  - Organiser
  - Phone Book
  - Contacts
  - File Manager
  - PIM Sync
  - Alarm Clock
  - Business Card Exchange
  - Calendar
  - Calculator
  - Stopwatch
  - Tasks
  - Timer
  - Notes
  - Calorie Counter
  - Step Counter
  - Fitness Applications
  - Flight Mode
  - Vibrating Alert
  - Conference Calls
  - Handsfree Speakerphone
- Connectivity
  - Bluetooth
  - GPRS
  - Infra Red
  - USB
  - EDGE
  - Fast Port
  - Synchronisation PC
  - Bluetooth stereo streaming
- Network
  - Quad Band Technology (GSM 850, GSM 900, GSM 1800 & GSM 1900)
- Internet
  - Modem
  - Access NetFront Web Browser
  - RSS Feeds
- Memory & Talk Time
  - 10 MB Memory Plus Memory Stick PRO Duo M2
  - 10 Hours Talk Time
  - 350 Hours Standby
- Weight & Size
  - 101 g
  - 88 x 48 x 24.5 mm

== Hidden icons ==
As with most Sony Ericsson phones, the W710 contains several hidden icons, or smileys, for use in SMS messages;

- :-* Smiley kiss
- :-] Large smile
- :-[ Large frown
- [:] Box smiley
