= Brec Bassinger =

American actress (born 1999)

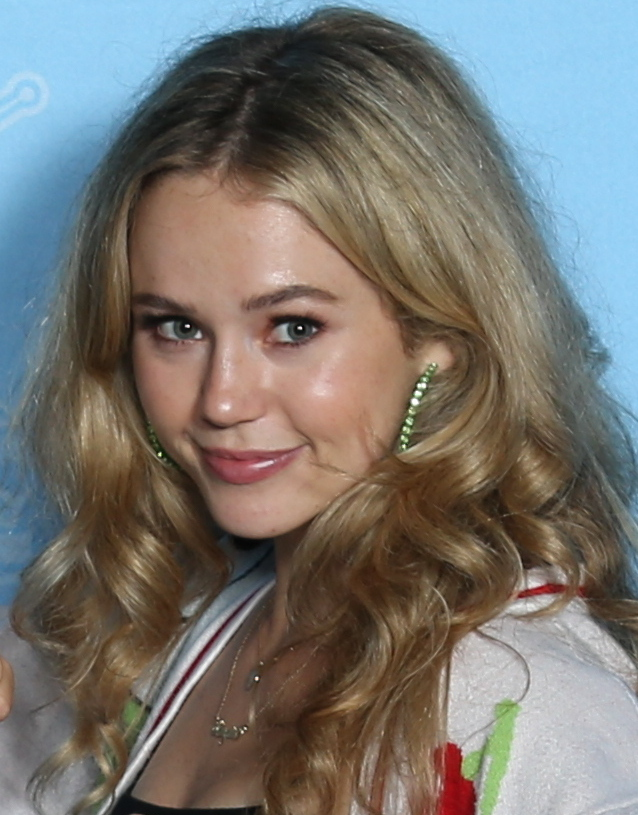
- Bassinger at the 2022 GalaxyCon Raleigh
- Born: May 25, 1999 (age 27); Saginaw, Texas, U.S.
- Occupation: Actress
- Years active: 2013–present

Brec Bassinger (born May 25, 1999) is an American actress. She began her career as a teenager and received recognition for her leading role in the Nickelodeon comedy series Bella and the Bulldogs (2015–2016). She then starred in the horror film 47 Meters Down: Uncaged (2019).

Bassinger gained recognition for leading the CW superhero series Stargirl (2020–2022), winning two Saturn Awards for her portrayal of the title character. She also starred in the supernatural horror film Final Destination Bloodlines (2025), her highest-grossing release to date.

== Early life ==
Bassinger was born in Saginaw, Texas on May 25, 1999. She has two older brothers named Beric and Brice.

Before becoming an actress, Bassinger was a competitive cheerleader. She also played basketball, volleyball, and ran track and field. She participated in beauty pageants and was an Our Little Miss World winner.

Bassinger was diagnosed with type 1 diabetes at the age of eight. She has served as an ambassador for Breakthrough T1D and has advocated for type 1 diabetes awareness, research funding, and affordable insulin.

== Career ==
Bassinger began acting in 2013 with the recurring role of Emma on the Nickelodeon sitcom The Haunted Hathaways. The following year, she was cast in the leading role of Bella on another Nickelodeon show, the comedy series Bella and the Bulldogs. It ran for two seasons from 2015 to 2016, and Bassinger announced the show's cancellation. In 2016, she joined the cast of the direct-to-video teen comedy film Status Update, which was released in 2018.

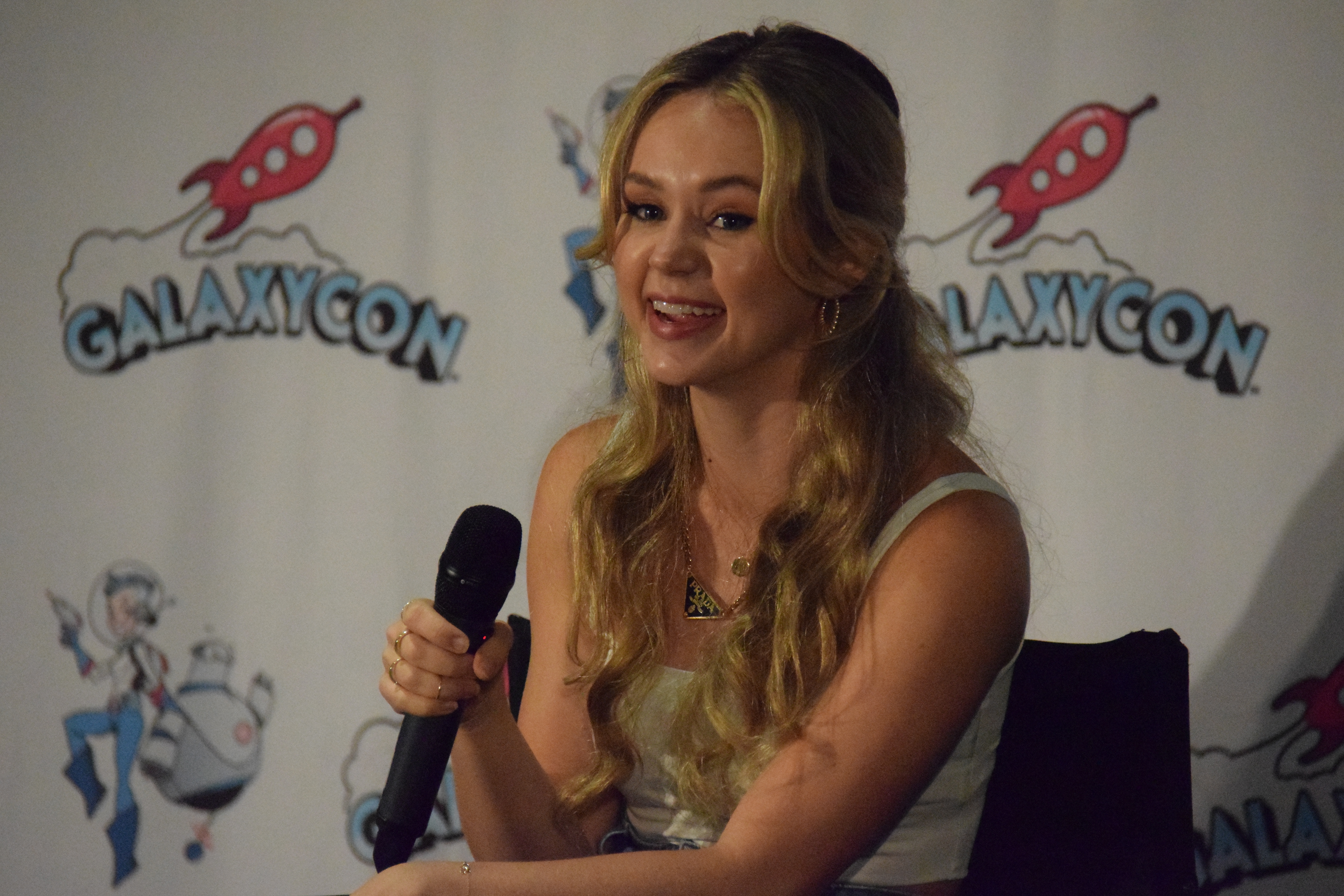
Bassinger speaking in 2022

In 2018, Bassinger played the role of Roni in the Hulu television series All Night. Also in 2018, Bassinger was cast in the lead role of Courtney Whitmore / Stargirl in The CW series Stargirl. The show was created by Geoff Johns, who cast Bassinger in the role because "She has the humor, she has the enthusiasm, the energy, the innate optimism, and Brec really embodies who Stargirl is". The series premiered on DC Universe and The CW in May 2020, ran for three seasons until December 2022, and was critically acclaimed. Linda Maleh of Forbes wrote that Bassinger's performance "brings all the optimism and idealism of someone young with her whole life ahead of her". Bassinger won two Saturn Awards for Best Performance by a Younger Actor in a Television Series out of three nominations.

In 2019, Bassinger made her feature film debut with the survival horror 47 Meters Down: Uncaged, which grossed $47 million and received mixed reviews. She followed this with The Man in the White Van (2023), an independent thriller film where she plays a starring role, also the recipient of mixed reviews. Better received was her role in Final Destination Bloodlines, the sixth film in the Final Destination franchise which saw Bassinger playing a younger version of Iris Campbell. She was cast in 2024, and it was released on May 16, 2025, becoming the best reviewed film of the series and grossing over $305 million worldwide.

== Filmography ==
=== Film ===
Key
†	Denotes films that have not yet been released

Year	Title	Role	Notes	Ref.
2018	Status Update	Maxi Moore	Direct-to-video	
2018	Killer Under the Bed	Kilee		
2019	47 Meters Down: Uncaged	Catherine		
2023	The Man in the White Van	Margaret Williams		
2025	Final Destination Bloodlines	Young Iris Campbell		
2026	Grizzly Night	Julie Helgeson		
2026	Buzzkill	Kendall		
2026	Quarter	Julie	Post-production	
TBA	Bad Counselors	Jenna		
TBA	Just Picture It	TBA	Post-production	
TBA	Remember Me	Shari Cooper	Post-production	

=== Television ===
Year	Title	Role	Notes	Ref.
2013–2014	The Haunted Hathaways	Emma	Recurring role (Seasons 1–2)	
2013, 2016	The Goldbergs	Zoe Macintosh	2 episodes	
2015	Liar, Liar, Vampire	Vi	Television film	
2015–2016	Bella and the Bulldogs	Bella Dawson	Lead role	
2016–2018	School of Rock	Kale	Recurring role (Seasons 2–3)	
2017	Code Black	Emma	Episode: "Vertigo"	
2018	All Night	Roni	Main role	
2018	Chicken Girls	Babs	Recurring role (season 2)	
2019–2024	The Loud House	Margo Roberts	Voice role; Recurring role	
2020–2022	Stargirl	Courtney Whitmore / Stargirl	Lead role	
2022	Robot Chicken	Reply Sara / Millennial Girl Toilet	Voice role; Episode: "May Cause Indecision... Or Not"	
2023	Titans	Courtney Whitmore / Stargirl	Episode: "Dude, Where's My Gar?"	
2023	V.C. Andrews' Dawn	Dawn Longchamp	Main role	
2023	Dew Drop Diaries	Willow Jasmine	Voice role; Recurring role	

== Awards and nominations ==
Organization	Year	Award	Work	Result	Ref.
Saturn Awards	2021	Best Performance by a Younger Actor in a Television Series	Stargirl	Won	
Saturn Awards	2022	Best Performance by a Younger Actor in a Television Series	Stargirl	Won	
Saturn Awards	2024	Best Performance by a Younger Actor in a Television Series	Stargirl	Nominated	
UCLA School of Theater, Film and Television Professional Programs	2026	Screenwriting Competition	Fumbled	Won	
