= Jeff Annison =

American businessman

- Education: University of California, Los Angeles (B.S.)
- Occupations: Co-Founder and President of Legion M Co-Founder of MobiTV
- Awards: Emmy for Technical Achievement in Advancing Television (2005)

Jeff Annison is an American businessperson, and co-founder and president of Legion M, the world's first fan-owned entertainment company. He is also the co-founder and CEO of New York Rock Exchange, co-founder and CEO of Underground Labs, and co-founder of MobiTV.

== Education and early career ==
Annison received his Bachelor of Science in Mechanical Engineering from the University of California, Los Angeles. He began his career designing special effects for theme park rides at Universal Studios and later designing toys for Hasbro.

== Legion M ==
Annison, along with business partner and MobiTV co-founder Paul Scanlan, founded Legion M in 2016 as the first entertainment studio allowing fans to invest in the creation of movies, TV shows, and other entertainment content. Its model was made possible after the SEC passed Title IV of the JOBS Act allowing non-accredited investors to make investments in small businesses. Legion M is currently backed by Seth Green, co-creator of the Emmy-winning TV series Robot Chicken, and Gaston Dominguez of Meltdown Entertainment.

== New York Rock Exchange ==
In 2013, Annison, along with business partners Joe Krause and Eric Lam, founded New York Rock Exchange, the first marketplace which allowed fans to purchase shares of individual songs. Three years later, the company went out of business.

== MobiTV ==
Annison partnered with Paul Scanlan and Phillip Alvelda to found MobiTV (originally known as Idetic) in 1999. Annison's first role was in engineering and product management. The company was started in order to deliver television to mobile devices. In 2005, Annison and his team were awarded an Emmy for Technical Achievement in Advancing Television for their work with MobiTV. In 2007, Alvelda stepped down as CEO and Annison and Scanlan were passed over in favor of Disney alum Charles Nooney.
