= Sony Ericsson Z710 =

Mobile phone model

Sony Ericsson Z710i
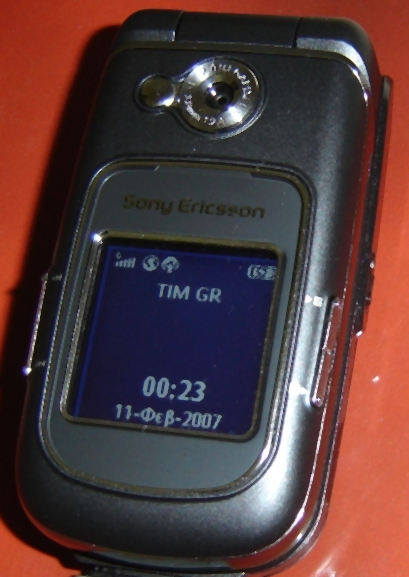
- Related: Sony Ericsson W710
- Compatible networks: GSM 850, GSM 900, GSM 1800, GSM 1900
- Dimensions: 88 mm × 48 mm × 24.5 mm (3.46 in × 1.89 in × 0.96 in)
- Weight: 101 g (3.6 oz)
- Memory: 10 MB Internal, 1 Memory Stick PRO Duo slot, 64 MB Memory Stick Micro included in box (Supports up to 4 GB Memory Stick Micro
- Display: 176x220 pixels, 262,144 Color TFT LCD
- Connectivity: EDGE, GPRS, HSCSD, Bluetooth v2, IrDA, USB 2

The Z710 is a mobile phone produced by Sony Ericsson

The Z710i / Z710c technically resembles the company's W710i 'Walkman' mobile phone. The two handsets share a number of features, such as Bluetooth, IR and USB connectivity, a 2-megapixel camera, media player and FM radio abilities. The Z710i/Z710c mobile phone is mainly targeted at business users whereas the W710i phone is mainly targeted at youth/sport markets. Although both phones feature many similar features, the W710i adds a number of extra features such as an improved 'Walkman' MP3 player, pedometer functions, flash menus and it also includes a larger memory card (512 MB on W710i vs. 64 MB on z710i) and an improved stereo headset. The Z710i is available in black (Twilight Black) or gold (Metallic Sand) colours with a blue on white external LCD and the W710i is available in purple or grey colours with an orange on white external display. The W710i also has a rubberised trim and buttons to the front of the phone

The Z710i and W710i were the first phones in the Sony Ericsson range to include the improved user interface which is featured in many newer Sony Ericsson models such as the W880i mobile phone.

The Z710i is also one of the first phones to use Sony's new finger-nail sized M2 flash card

The Z710i comes in two colours, called "twilight black" and "metallic sand". The handset weighs 101 grams and measures 88 x 48 x 24.5 mm which, according to the manufacturer, it provides the user with a compact and stylish handset.

== Key features ==
- Dual screens
- 2-megapixel camera with 2.5 × zoom
- Media player supporting MP3, AAC, MPEG4 and 3GP formats.
- Bluetooth Technology
- Quad Band Technology (GSM 850, GSM 900, GSM 1800 & GSM 1900)
- Take pictures of videos (while playing the video, press the camera button and it will take a picture)

== Software flaw ==
An isolated issue with the software on this model of phone involves the phone's integrated call logging feature. At various times the phone will randomly stop logging all call activity in the phone's call history. This includes the stoppage of all calls logged as "Answered" by the phone owner, "Dialed" by the phone owner, and calls "Missed" by the phone owner. Sony Ericsson seems readily knowledgeable about the problem as their telephone tech support agents will readily give customers an answer which is the only current remedy so far. The remedy from Sony Ericsson is for the phone's owner to activate the phone's built in software Master reset, and to flash the phone back to the original factory settings every time the random error occurs. Upon doing so, any and all contacts not saved to the SIM card are lost, all customizations of themes and backgrounds are lost, non-saved text or picture messages are lost, plus any downloaded Java applets or ringtones that are not saved to the M2 Micro memory card are also lost as well.

Another possible remedy discovered by some customers is to delete all calls logged in the call history to date until the call history is empty. The call history will then begin to log all calls again.

== Full specifications ==
- Sony-Ericsson official website
