= Sony Ericsson Z500a =

Mobile phone model

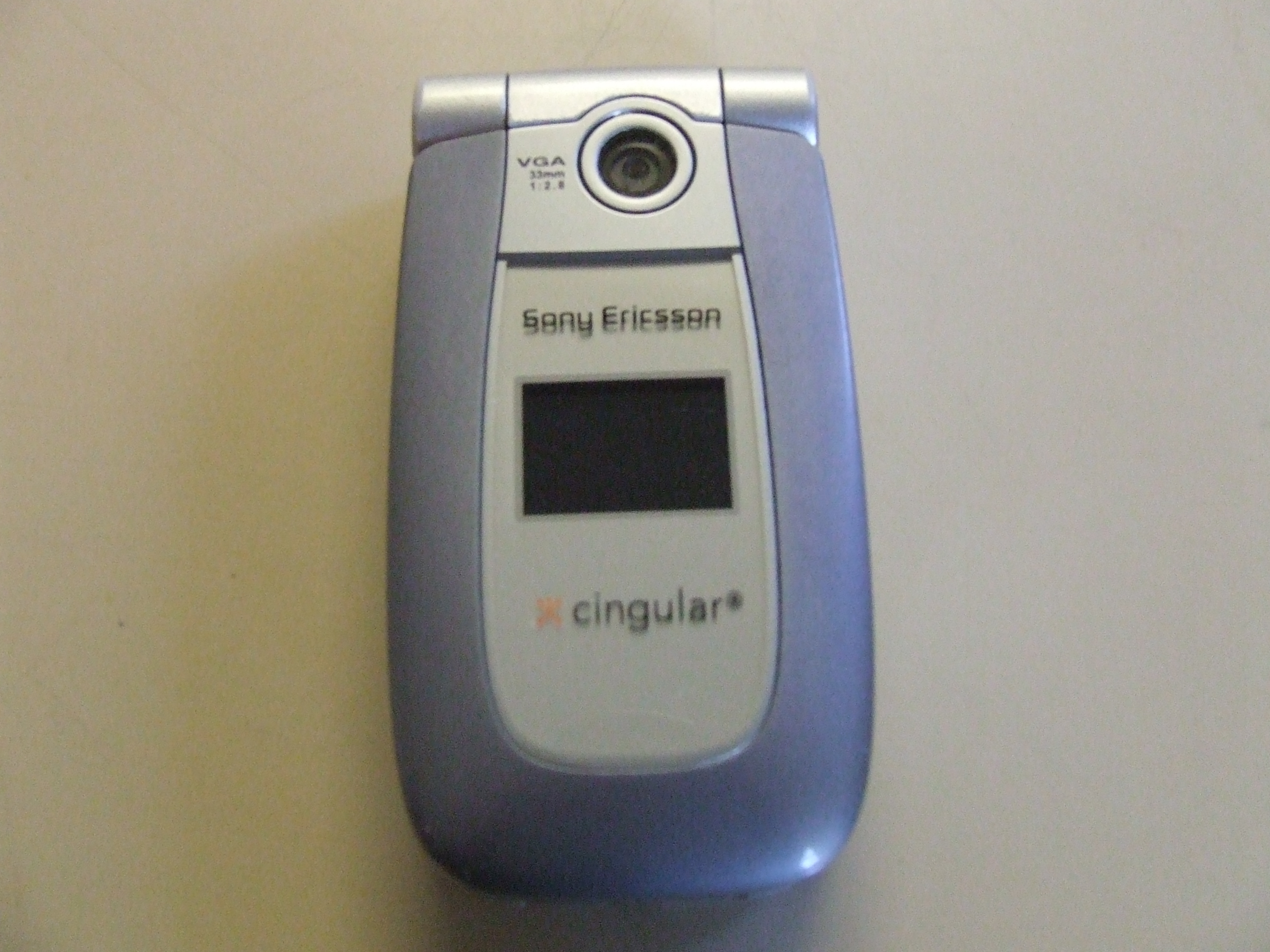
- First released: December 2004
- Compatible networks: EDGE (class 10)/GPRS/GSM 850/1800/1900 MHz
- Dimensions: 93 x 49 x 24 mm (3.7 x 1.9 x 0.9 inches)
- Weight: 110 g (3.9 oz)
- Memory: Phone memory 6 MB (Actual free memory may vary due to phone pre-configuration.)
- Battery: Li-ion
- Rear camera: 640 x 480 pixels (VGA)
- Display: 128 x 160 pixels 65,536 color LCD
- Connectivity: USB

The Sony Ericsson Z500a, released in December 2004, was released through Cingular Wireless and Dobson Cellular. The phone has push-to-talk walkie-talkie functionality, but the handset was released before Cingular had rolled out their Push to Talk service.

This is a camera phone that has motion capture that can send short videos through the Multimedia Messaging System. It operates on GSM 850/1800/1900.

The Z500a was also marketed with a Star Wars Episode III shell and assorted Star Wars ringtones and backgrounds and a demo game that could be downloaded. Sony Ericsson offered additional Star Wars shells so that fans could choose their favorite characters/scenes.
