= Paul Scanlan =

American businessman

- Education: BA Communications
- Alma mater: University of Wisconsin–Madison
- Occupations: CEO and co-founder of Legion M
- Awards: Emmy for Technical Achievement (2005)

Paul Scanlan is an American businessman and the co-founder and CEO of Legion M, a fan-owned entertainment company. He is also the president and co-founder of MobiTV, an on-demand video streaming service for mobile devices.

== Education and early career ==
Scanlan graduated from the University of Wisconsin-Madison with a B.A degree in communications. He began his career in sales at telecommunications firm Lucent Technologies and later co-founded a boutique ad agency. He was also a managing partner at Enterprise IG (now Brand Union).

== MobiTV ==
Scanlan partnered with Phillip Alvelda and Jeff Annison to found MobiTV (originally known as Idetic) in 1999. In 2005, Scanlan and his team were awarded an engineering Emmy for bringing live broadcasts to cellphones. Forbes included him in a "Names You Need to Know" list in 2011, largely for creating the mobile video space with MobiTV and launching the first mobile television network with Sprint Corporation in 2003. Scanlan has also helped to raise more than $100 million in investment for the company. His first role was VP of marketing becoming the chief operating officer in 2005 and president in 2007. He has been a member of the board since inception.

== Legion M ==
Scanlan, along with business partner and MobiTV co-founder Jeff Annison, founded Legion M in 2016, which claims to be the industry's first fan-owned media company. Legion M lets fans invest in and be part of the creation of the company's media content. As of March 2018, the company has raised $3 million in funding from more than 7,000 fan owners. It drives revenue through partnerships with creators, independent filmmakers, and established Hollywood studios.

Advisors of the company include Stoopid Buddy Stoodios, Tim League, Adam Rymer, Scott Landsman, and William Shatner.
