= Legion M =

Media company

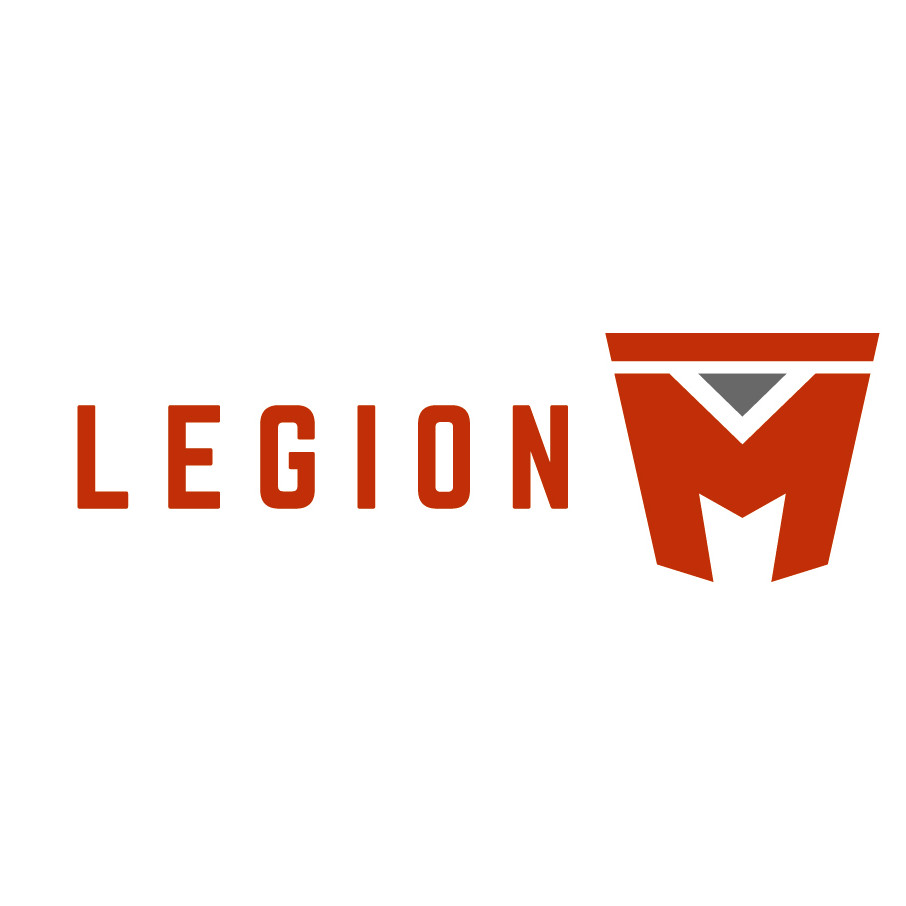
- Type: Private
- Industry: Entertainment
- Founded: 2016; 10 years ago
- Founder: Paul Scanlan; Jeff Annison
- Products: Motion pictures, television, video games
- Website: legionm.com

Legion M (founded 2016) is an independent production company which makes films.

== History ==
Legion M was co-founded by Paul Scanlan and Jeff Annison in March 2016. It is the world's first entertainment studio which "allows fans to invest in and participate in the creation of movies, television series, virtual reality experiences and entertainment content". This model became possible after the SEC passed Title IV of the JOBS Act which allowed non-accredited investors to invest in small businesses.

On August 14, 2016, Legion M closed its initial funding round with $1,000,000 from over 3,000 investors. It filed with the SEC to launch their 2nd funding round as a Reg A+ in March 2017. due to higher funding thresholds and attracting more investors. Later in 2024, the company raised $5 million from 15,000 individual investors.

In 2024, Legion M distributed its first film with the theatrical release of the documentary William Shatner: You Can Call Me Bill. Their next film, My Dead Friend Zoe, debuted at the 2023 SXSW Film Festival and won The Audience Award, Best Feature Narrative at the Woodstock Film Festival 2024, and several other addition festival awards. It was acquired by the distribution company, Briarcliff Entertainment, which released in February 28, 2025, to critical acclaim.

In July 2025, Legion M announced that it had surpassed 58,000 investors and raised more than $25 million in capital following the close of its tenth fundraising round.

== Filmography ==
Legion M has produced, co-produced, funded, or distributed a number of films, including:

Title	Release date	Role(s)	Notes
Colossal	2016	Release Partner	Sci-fi meets personal drama
Bad Samaritan	2018	Release Partner	Psychological thriller
Mandy	2018	Equity Investor (Film & Soundtrack), Merch & Licensing	Starring Nicolas Cage
The Field Guide to Evil	2018	Equity Investor	Horror anthology
Tolkien	2019	Release Partner	Biopic on J. R. R. Tolkien
Memory: The Origins of Alien	2019	Distributor (w/ Screen Media), Merch & Licensing	Exploration of Alien’s legacy
Jay and Silent Bob Reboot	2019	Equity Investor, Merch & Licensing	Sequel to Jay and Silent Bob Strike Back
Save Yourselves!	2020	Release Partner, Merch & Licensing	Sci-fi comedy about tech detox
Archenemy	2020	Executive Producer, Equity Investor (Film & Soundtrack), Merch & Licensing	Indie superhero noir
I'm Your Man	2021	–	Romantic sci-fi
Nandor Fodor and the Talking Mongoose	2023	Executive Producer, Equity Investor, Marketing Partner	Based on a true story from the 1930s
This Is Not Financial Advice	2023	Executive Producer, Equity Investor, Marketing Partner	About finance influencers
William Shatner: You Can Call Me Bill	2023	Producer, Financier	William Shatner’s life and philosophy
My Dead Friend Zoe	2024	Producer, Financier	Veteran drama with comedy twist
Fackham Hall	2025	Distributor, Financier, Marketing Partner (w/ Bleecker Street)	Parody of period dramas
