= Leland Sklar discography =

Leland Sklar is an American bassist and session musician. He was born in Milwaukee, and moved with his family to Los Angeles at age of four. He was a member of the Los Angeles-based instrumental group The Section, who served as the de facto house band of Asylum Records and were one of the progenitors of the soft rock sound prevalent on top-40 radio in the 1970s and 1980s. Besides appearing as the backing band on numerous recordings by artists such as James Taylor, Jackson Browne, Carole King, and Linda Ronstadt, The Section released three solo albums of instrumental rock. Both in The Section and separately, Sklar has contributed to over 2,000 albums as a session and touring musician. He has toured with James Taylor, Phil Collins, Toto, Lyle Lovett and other major acts. He has also been recorded on many soundtracks, motion pictures and television shows.

== Selected albums (by artist) ==
=== A ===
- A-Mei (Kulilay Amit) — Regarless (2000)
- Cristina Abaroa — Cristina (2000)
- Greg Adams — Hidden Agenda (1995)
- Pepe Aguilar — Negociaré con la pena EP (2011)
- Air Supply — The Vanishing Race (1993)
- Laith Al-Saadi — Real (2013)
- Alan — Azul (1999)
- Laura Allan:
  - Laura Allan (1978)
  - Telegraph (2000)
- Deborah Allen — Trouble In Paradise (1980)
- Peter Allen:
  - I Could Have Been a Sailor (1979)
  - The Very Best of Peter Allen a.k.a. in the U.S as The Best (1982)
- Arthur Alligood One Silver Needle (2012)
- Alvin and the Chipmunks — Chipmunk Punk (1980)
- America
  - Alibi (1980)
  - Highway: 30 Years Of America (2000)
  - Classic Album Collection (2019)
- American Flyer — American Flyer (1976)
- Peter Anders — Peter Anders (1972)
- Paul Anka — Walk A Fine Line (1983)
- Giorgio Onorato Aquilani — see Giorgio
- Yumi Arai — see Yumi Matsutoya
- Nathalie Archangel — Nathalie Archangel (1987)
- The Archers:
  - Things We Deeply Feel (1975)
  - At Their Very Best (1982)
- Tina Arena — In Deep (1997)
- Renee Armand:
  - The Rain Book (1972)
  - In Time (1978)
- Bronson Arroyo — Covering the Bases (2005)
- Mark Ashton — Mark Ashton (1976)
- Chet Atkins & Suzy Bogguss — Simpatico (1994)
- Avalon — Oxygen (2001)
- Hoyt Axton:
  - Life Machine (1974)
  - Road Songs (1977)
  - Pistol Packin' Mama (1982)
  - Pistol Packin' Mama/Spin of the Wheel (1998)

=== B ===
- Py Bäckman — P20Y10 (2010)
- Russ Ballard — At The Third Stroke (1978)
- Barefoot Servants:
  - Barefoot Servants (1994)
  - Barefoot Servants 2 (2005)
- Lari Basilio:
  - Your Love (2022)
  - Redemption (2025)
- Cat Beach — Love Me Out Loud (2009)
- The Bellamy Brothers — Rebels Without A Clue (1988)
- Regina Belle — Passion (1993)
- Marc Benno and the Nightcrawlers — Crawlin (2005)
- Gary Benson — Moonlight Walking (1980)
- Barbi Benton — Something New (1975)
- Byron Berline — Outrageous (1980)
- Louis Bertignac — Suis-Moi (2014)
- Anne Bertucci:
  - I'm Number One (1982)
  - Anne Bertucci III (1983)
- Big Blue Wrecking Crew (Steve Yeager, Rick Monday, Jerry Reuss & Jay Johnstone) — We Are the Champions (single) (1981)
- Bishop & Gwinn — This Is Our Night (1979)
- Stephen Bishop:
  - Bish (1978)
  - Sleeping With Girls (1985)
  - Be Here Then (2014)
  - Thimk (2025)
- Clint Black:
  - The Hard Way (1992)
  - No Time to Kill (1993)
  - Looking for Christmas (1995)
  - Nothin' but the Taillights (1997)
  - Christmas with You (2004)
  - On Purpose (2015)
  - Out Of Sane (2020)
- Peter Blakeley — Harry's Café De Wheels (1989)
- Ronee Blakley — Ronee Blakley (1972)
- Blinker the Star — August Everywhere (1999)
- Blue Peppers — Believe In Love (2020) 7" single
- Alfie Boe — Trust (2013)
- Suzy Bogguss:
  - Aces (1991)
  - Voices in the Wind (1992)
  - Something Up My Sleeve (1993)
  - Simpatico (with Chet Atkins) (1994)
  - Give Me Some Wheels (1996)
  - Nobody Love, Nobody Gets Hurt (1998)
- Karla Bonoff:
  - Karla Bonoff (1977)
  - All My Life: The Best of Karla Bonoff (1999)
- Debby Boone:
  - Debby Boone (1979)
  - With My Song (1980)
  - Surrender (1983)
  - Friends For Life (1987)
- Miguel Bosé — Miguel (1980)
- Mike Botts — Adults Only (2000)
- Terence Boylan — Terence Boylan (1977)
- Laura Branigan — Branigan (1982)
- Steven Brault — A Pitch At Broadway + (2020)
- Amanda Brecker — Blossom (2011)
- Edie Brickell — see Steve Martin & Edie Brickell
- Sarah Brightman — As I Came of Age (1998)
- Karen Brooks — Hearts Of Fire (1984)
- Jackson Browne:
  - Jackson Browne (1972)
  - For Everyman (1973)
  - The Pretender (1976)
  - Running on Empty (1977)
- Harry Browning & Laury Boone — Push Back The Darkness (1984)
- Harry Robert Browning — No Alibis (1986)
- Bryndle — Bryndle (1995)
- Peabo Bryson / Roberta Flack — Born to Love (1983)
- Jimmy Buffett — Boats, Beaches, Bars & Ballads (1992)
- Stan Bush — Stan Bush (1983)
- Rosemary Butler — You Just Watch Me (2013)

=== C ===
- Kreag Caffey — Kreag Caffey (1972)
- Steve Camp:
  - One On One (1986)
  - After God's Own Heart (1987)
  - Justice (1988)
  - Consider the Cost (1991)
  - Desiring God (2002)
- Glen Campbell — Bloodline (1976)
- Paulette Carlson — Love Goes On (1991)
- Vanessa Carlton — Be Not Nobody (2002)
- Eric Carmen — Change of Heart (1978)
- Kim Carnes:
  - Kim Carnes (1975)
  - St. Vincent's Court (1979)
  - Barking at Airplanes (1985)
  - View from the House (1988)
- Bob Carpenter — Silent Passage (1975)
- Bruce Carroll — see Various Artists — Our Family (1993)
- Jim Carroll — Jim Carroll (1971)
- Eliza Carthy — Angels & Cigarettes (2000)
- Lionel Cartwright — I Watched It on the Radio (1990)
- David Cassidy:
  - The Higher They Climb - The Harder They Fall (1975)
  - Home Is Where the Heart Is (1976)
- Cate Brothers — Cate Bros. (1975)
- The Cats — Hard To Be Friends (1975)
- Cecilio & Kapono:
  - Cecilio & Kapono (1974)
  - Elua (1975)
  - Best Of Cecilio & Kapono (1977)
  - Best Collection (reissue - 1983)
  - Journey Through The Years (1998)
  - The Journey Continues (1999)
- Rosalino Cellamare — (See Ron)
- Peter Cetera:
  - You're the Inspiration: A Collection (1997)
  - The Very Best Of Peter Cetera (2017)
- Bill Champlin — Runaway (1981)
- Jeff Chang — Intuition (1997)
- Phil Chang:
  - Moon/Sun (月亮 太陽) (1998)
  - Rain Keeps Falling (雨一直下) (1999)
- Beth Nielsen Chapman:
  - Beth Nielsen Chapman (1990)
  - You Hold the Key (1993)
  - Greatest Hits (1999)
- Steven Curtis Chapman:
  - Heaven in the Real World (1994)
  - The Music of Christmas (1995)
  - Signs of Life (1996)
  - Greatest Hits (1997)
  - Declaration (2001)
  - All About Love (2003)
- Charlene:
  - Charlene (1976)
  - I've Never Been To Me (1982)
- Ray Charles — My World (1993)
- Kerry Chater — Part Time Love (1977)
- Kristin Chenoweth — For the Girls (2019)
- Cher:
  - I'd Rather Believe in You (1976)
  - Heart of Stone (1989)
- Gene Clark — No Other (1974)
- Michael Clark — Free As A Breeze (1977)
- Allan Clarke — Legendary Heroes a.k.a. The Only One (1980)
- Claudia — Claudia (1981)
- Julien Clerc — Si J'Étais Elle (2000)
- Billy Cobham — Spectrum (1973)
- Joe Cocker — Heart and Soul (2004)
- Laurie Kaye Cohen — Under The Skunk (1973)
- Leonard Cohen — The Future (1992)
- Jude Cole:
  - A View From Third Street (1990)
  - Start the Car (1992)
- Lloyd Cole — Don't Get Weird on Me Babe (1991)
- Natalie Cole:
  - Don’t Look Back (1980)
  - Anthology (2003)
- Mark Collie — Tennessee Plates (1995)
- Phil Collins:
  - No Jacket Required (1985)
  - ...But Seriously (1989)
  - Serious Hits... Live! (1990)
  - ...Hits (1998)
  - Finally... The First Farewell Tour (2004) - DVD
- Chi Coltrane — Chi Coltrane (1972)
- Shawn Colvin — Cover Girl (1994)
- Rita Coolidge:
  - The Lady's Not for Sale (1972)
  - Fall into Spring (1974)
  - It's Only Love (1975)
  - Anytime...Anywhere (1977)
  - All About Rita Coolidge (1979)
  - Sounds Capsule (1979)
  - Fool That I Am (1980)
  - Love From Tokyo (1984)
- Alice Cooper — From The Inside (1978)
- Dana Cooper — Dana Cooper (1973)
- Country Gazette — Don't Give Up Your Day Job (1973)
- The Coyote Sisters — Women and Other Visions (2001)
- CPR:
  - CPR (1998)
  - Just Like Gravity (2001)
- David Crosby:
  - Oh Yes I Can (1989)
  - Thousand Roads (1993)
  - Voyage (2006)
  - Croz (2014)
- Crosby & Nash:
  - Graham Nash David Crosby (1972)
  - Wind on the Water (1975)
  - The best of David Crosby and Graham Nash (1978)
  - The Best of Crosby & Nash: The ABC Years (2002)
  - Crosby & Nash (2004)
- Crosby, Stills & Nash:
  - Replay (1980)
  - Daylight Again (1982)
  - Live It Up (1990)
- Crosby, Stills, Nash & Young:
  - CSN or Carry On (1991)
- Andraé Crouch — I'll Be Thinking of You (1979)
- Rodney Crowell — Life Is Messy (1992)
- Catie Curtis — Catie Curtis (1997)

=== D ===
- Paul D'Adamo — Tell Me Something (2010)
- Patti Dahlstrom:
  - The Way I Am (1973)
  - Emotion: The Music Of Patti Dahlstrom (2010)
- Terence Trent d'Arby — Terence Trent d'Arby's Symphony or Damn (1993)
- Lacy J. Dalton — Survivor (1989)
- Gail Davies:
  - I'll Be There (1980)
  - Givin' Herself Away (1982)
  - What Can I Say (1983)
  - Where Is a Woman to Go + (1984)
- Mac Davis:
  - Burnin' Thing (1975)
  - Songs I Grew Up With (1975)
- Spencer Davis — Mousetrap (1972)
- Mike Deasy — Letters To My Head (1973)
- Michael DeGreve — Gypsy's Lament (1989)
- Jackie DeShannon — New Arrangement (1975)
- Neil Diamond:
  - Lovescape (1991)
  - Christmas Album (1992)
- Dion DiMucci — Streetheart (1976)
- Celine Dion — All the Way... A Decade of Song (1999)
- Craig Doerge — Craig Doerge (1973)
- Thomas Dolby — Astronauts & Heretics (1992)
- Donovan:
  - Essence to Essence (1973)
  - Slow Down World (1976)
  - Lady of the Stars (1983)
- The Doors — Full Circle (1972)
- Doro — True At Heart (1991)
- Josh Doyle — Josh Doyle (2012)

=== E ===
- Sheena Easton — Best Kept Secret (1983)
- Chris Eaton — Wonderful World (1995)
- Marcus Eaton — Versions Of The Truth (2015)
- Steve Eaton:
  - Hey Mr. Dreamer (1974)
  - Steve Eaton (1979)
  - Lucky Me (2021)
- Randy Edelman:
  - If Love Is Real (1977)
  - You're the One (1979)
- Yvonne Elliman:
  - Night Flight (1978)
  - Yvonne (1979)
- England Dan & John Ford Coley:
  - Dr. Heckle & Mr. Jive (1979)
  - The Atlantic Albums + (2015)
- Era:
  - Era (1996)
  - Era 2 (2000)
- Evie — Christmas Memories (1987)
- Skip Ewing — The Will to Love (1989)

=== F ===
- Lara Fabian — A Wonderful Life (2004)
- Mimi Fariña & Tom Jans — Take Heart (1971)
- Don Felder — Road to Forever (2012)
- Vanessa Fernandez — Use Me (2014)
- John Fischer:
  - Inside (1977)
  - Dark Horse (1982)
- Roberta Flack — see Peabo Bryson / Roberta Flack
- Flo & Eddie — Illegal, Immoral and Fattening (1975)
- Dan Fornero — Not So Old School (2013)
- Keith Forsey — Dynamite (1981)
- Peter Frampton — Peter Frampton (1994)
- Cleve Francis — Tourist In Paradise (1992)
- Kinky Friedman — Kinky Friedman (1974)
- Craig Fuller and Eric Kaz — Craig Fuller/Eric Kaz (1978)
- Richie Furay — I Still Have Dreams (1979)

=== G ===
- Ana Gabriel — Vivencias (1996)
- Peter Gabriel — see the soundtrack for the movie Birdy
- Tony Galla — A.S.A.P. (1998) (2000) (2001) (2004)
- David Garfield
  - see Various Artists — Tribute To Jeff Porcaro (1997)
  - Jazz Outside The Box (2018)
- Art Garfunkel:
  - Breakaway (1975)
  - Songs from a Parent to a Child (1997)
- Garou — Seul (2000)
- Grant Geissman — Bop! Bang! Boom! (2012)
- Sarah Geronimo — Becoming + (2006)
- León Gieco:
  - Desenchufado (1994)
  - El Hombrecito del Mar + (2022)
- Vince Gill:
  - The Way Back Home (1987)
  - Let There Be Peace on Earth (1993)
  - High Lonesome Sound (1996)
- Giorgio — Gorgio's Party Of The Century (2010)
- Chuck Girard — Glow in the Dark (1976)
- Goanna — Oceania (1985)
- Louise Goffin:
  - Kid Blue (1979)
  - Louise Goffin (1981)
- Andrew Gold:
  - What's Wrong With This Picture? (1976)
  - All This and Heaven Too (1978)
  - Thank You For Being A Friend: The Best Of Andrew Gold (1997)
  - Andrew Gold + What's Wrong With This Picture + All This And Heaven Too + Whirlwind... Plus (2013)
  - Lonely Boy: The Asylum Years Anthology (2020)
- Amy Grant:
  - Legacy...Hymns and Faith (2002)
  - Simple Things (2003)
- Steve Green — The First Noel (1996)
- James Griffin:
  - Breakin' Up Is Easy (1973)
  - Just Like Yesterday: The Solo Anthology 1974-77 (2013)
- Andy Griffith — Precious Memories: 33 Timeless Hymns (1995)
- Bernard Grimaldi — Toute Ressemblance Avec Des Personnes Ayant... (1990)
- Grimaldi-Zeiher:
  - Grimaldi / Zeiher (1978)
  - Recidive (1980)
- Group Therapy — see Various Artists — Summer Girls Vol. 1: Lost Sunshine Pop Gems of the 1960s (2020)
- Tami Gunden — Celebration (1987)
- Arlo Guthrie — Last of the Brooklyn Cowboys (1973)
- Alejandra Guzmán — Algo Natural (1999)

=== H ===
- Sammy Hagar — The Best Of Sammy Hagar (1992)
- Merle Haggard:
  - 1994 (1994)
  - Chicago Wind (2005)
- Hall & Oates:
  - Daryl Hall & John Oates (1975)
  - Bigger Than Both of Us (1976)
  - Beauty on a Back Street (1977)
- Danniebelle Hall — This Moment (1975)
- Ellis Hall — Straight Ahead (2004)
- Mari Hamada:
  - Anti-Heroine (1993)
  - Introducing... Mari Hamada (1993)
  - Persona (1996)
  - Gracia (2018)
  - Soar (2023)
- Albert Hammond — Your World And My World (1981)
- Loren Harriet — Round Up The Usual Suspects (1993/1995)
- Sherman Hayes — Vagabonds Roost (1973)
- Don Henley — I Can't Stand Still (1982)
- Carly Hennessy — Ultimate High (2001)
- Taylor Henry — Evergreen (2026)
- Michael W. Herndon:
  - Even in the Rain (2000)
  - The Spirit of the Sun (2008)
- Annie Herring:
  - Through A Child's Eyes (1976)
  - Picture Frames (2000)
- Taylor Hicks — Taylor Hicks (2006)
- Faith Hill — Cry (2002)
- Chris Hillman:
  - Slippin' Away (1976)
  - Like A Hurricane (1998)
  - The Asylum Years (2018)
- Chris & Herb — Bakersfield Bound (1996)
- Peter Himmelman — The Boat That Carries Us (2014)
- Becky Hobbs — Everyday (1977)
- Roger Hodgson — Hai Hai (1987)
- Susanna Hoffs:
  - Bright Lights (2021)
  - The Deep End (2023)
- Peter Hofmann — Peter Hofmann Singt Elvis Presley: Love Me Tender (1992)
- Engelbert Humperdinck — After Dark (1996)
- Brian Hyland — Brian Hyland (1970)

=== I ===
- Janis Ian:
  - Restless Eyes (1981)
  - Uncle Wonderful (1984)
- Enrique Iglesias — Vivir (1997)
- Julio Iglesias — Crazy (1994)
- Mari Iijima:
  - Believe (1991)
  - Different Worlds (1993)
  - The Classics (1993)
- The Immediate Family:
  - Honey Don't Leave LA (2018)
  - Live In Japan at Billboard Live Tokyo June 18, 2018 (2018)
  - Turn It Up To 10 (2020)
  - Slippin & Slidin EP (2020)
  - Can't Stop Progress EP (2021)
  - The Immediate Family (2021)
  - Live From Telefunken Soundstage digital EP (2022)
  - Skin in the Game (2024)
- James Ingram:
  - The Best Of James Ingram - The Power Of Great Music (1991)
  - Forever More (Love Songs, Hits & Duets) (1999)
- Yōsui Inoue — white (1978)
- Iruka:
  - 植物誌 (1977) [Flora]
  - 我が心の友へ (1980) [To My Heart's Friend]
  - Big Challenge (1984)
  - Old Friend (1991)

=== J ===
- Paul Jabara — Paul Jabara And Friends featuring The Weather Girls/Leata Galloway/Whitney Houston (1983)
- Freddie Jackson — Time for Love (1992)
- Jacintha — Fire & Rain (2018)
- Tom Jans — Champion (1982)
- Javier — Lucha Y Verás (1999)
- Jelly — A True Story (1976)
- Waylon Jennings — see the soundtrack for the movie The Pursuit of D. B. Cooper (1981)
- Flaco Jiménez — Partners (1992)
- Laurence Juber — PCH (2008)
- Wynonna Judd — Wynonna (1992)

=== K ===
- Joshua Kadison — Delilah Blue (1995)
- Evie Karlsson — see Evie
- John Kay — My Sportin' Life (1973)
- Phil Keaggy — Love Broke Thru (1976)
- The Keane Brothers — The Keane Brothers (1977)
- Barbara Keith — Barbara Keith (1973)
- Sally Kellerman — Sally (2009)
- Casey Kelly:
  - Casey Kelly (1972)
  - For Sale (1973)
- B.B. King — B. B. King & Friends: 80 (2005)
- Carole King:
  - Thoroughbred (1976)
  - Live at the Troubadour (2010)
- King Of Hearts — Close, But No Guitar (1978)
- Scott Kirby — Row Me Home (2009)
- Klaatu — Endangered Species (1980)
- Ted Knight — Hi Guys (1975)
- Danny Kortchmar — Innuendo (1980)
- Steven Kowalczyk (Santoro) — Moods And Grooves (1995)
- Kris Kristofferson:
  - Spooky Lady's Sideshow (1974)
  - Who's to Bless and Who's to Blame (1975)
  - Surreal Thing (1976)
- Kris Kristofferson and Rita Coolidge — Full Moon (1973)
- Leah Kunkel — Leah Kunkel (1979)
- Stephen "Doc" Kupka — Doc Kupka presents Doc Goes Hollywood featuring John Lee Sanders & The William Ross Orchestra (2008)

=== L ===
- Bill LaBounty:
  - This Night Won't Last Forever (1978)
  - Time Starts Now: The Definitive Anthology (2011)
- Serge Lama — Lama (1994)
- Dave Lambert:
  - Framed (1979)
  - Work in Progress (2004)
- David LaMotte — Still (2022)
- Matt Lashoff — Look At Me Now (2023)
- Daniel Lavoie:
  - Here In The Heart (1992)
  - Woman to Man (1994)
- Ronnie Laws:
  - Mr. Nice Guy (1983)
  - Classic Masters (1984)
- Julian Lennon — Jude (2022)
- Tom Lerner — Man On The Ledge (2014)
- Lesuchan — Take Me To Your House (1993)
- Irene Loche — Keep Walking EP (2025)
- Lisa Loeb:
  - Firecracker (1997)
  - Cake and Pie (2002)
  - Hello Lisa (2002)
- Nils Lofgren — Breakaway Angel (2002)
- Dave Loggins — Apprentice (In a Musical Workshop) (1974)
- Patty Loveless:
  - Honky Tonk Angel (1988)
  - On Down the Line (1990)
- Lyle Lovett:
  - Lyle Lovett and His Large Band (1989)
  - Joshua Judges Ruth (1992)
  - The Road to Ensenada (1996)
  - Step Inside This House (1998)
- Steve Lukather:
  - Lukather (1989)
  - Ever Changing Times (2008)
  - Transition (2013)
  - Bridges (2023)

=== M ===
- Mary MacGregor — ...In Your Eyes (1978)
- Noriyuki Makihara — Songs from L.A. (2007)
- Bob Malone — Ain't What You Know (2008)
- Barbara Mandrell — Key's in the Mailbox (1991)
- The Manhattan Transfer — The Offbeat of Avenues (1991)
- Barry Manilow — Greatest Hits Vol. II aka in UK, etc. A Touch More Magic (1983)
- Barry Mann — Barry Mann (1980)
- Ciro Manna — XY (2015)
- Clair Marlo — Let It Go (1989)
- Amanda Marshall — Amanda Marshall (1995)
- Ricky Martin — A Medio Vivir (1995)
- Steve Martin & Edie Brickell — So Familiar (2015)
- Richard Marx:
  - Rush Street (1991)
  - Paid Vacation (1994)
- Johnny Mathis and Deniece Williams — That's What Friend Are For (1978)
- Hiroyuki Matsuda — Two Of Us (1992)
- Keiko Matsui:
  - Under Northern Lights (1988)
  - No Borders (1990)
  - Collection (1997)
- Yumi Matsutoya:
  - The 14th Moon (1976) — (credited to "Yumi Arai")
  - The Gates of Heaven (1990)
  - Dawn Purple (1991)
  - Tears and Reasons (1992)
  - U-miz (1993)
  - The Dancing Sun (1994)
  - Kathmandu (1995)
  - Wave Of The Zuvuya (1997)
  - Cowgirl Dreamin' (1997)
  - Acacia (2001)
- Kathy Mattea — The Innocent Years (2000)
- Herman Matthews — Home At Last (2007)
- Mac McAnally:
  - Simple Life (1990)
  - Knots (1994)
- McBride & the Ride — Hurry Sundown (1993)
- Dave McCluskey — A Long Time Coming! (1978)
- Marilyn McCoo & Billy Davis Jr. — Marilyn & Billy (1978)
- Maureen McCormick — When You Get a Little Lonely (1995)
- Scotty McCreery — Clear as Day (2011)
- Michael McDonald — Wide Open (2017)
- Megan McDonough — Megan Music (1972)
- Reba McEntire:
  - The Last One to Know (1987)
  - Sweet Sixteen (1989)
  - For My Broken Heart (1991)
  - Read My Mind (1994)
  - Starting Over (1995)
  - Greatest Collection (2004)
  - Reba: Duets (2007)
- Pat McGee — Pat McGee (2015)
- Roger McGuinn:
  - Roger McGuinn (1973)
  - Peace on You (1974)
  - Born to Rock & Roll (1991)
- Barry McGuire:
  - Lighten Up (1974)
  - Have You Heard (1977)
- Bret McKenzie — Songs Without Jokes (2022)
- Scott McQuaig — Scott McQuaig (1990)
- Bill Medley — Your Heart to Mine: Dedicated to the Blues (2013)
- Bette Midler
  - Broken Blossom (1977)
  - It's the Girls! (2014)
- Luis Miguel — 33 (2003)
- Bruce Miller — Rude Awakening (1975)
- Julie Miller — Meet Julie Miller (1990)
- Craig Mirijanian — A Perfect Fit (1980)
- Eddy Mitchell — Héros (2013)
- The Mob — The Mob (1975)
- John Michael Montgomery — What I Do the Best (1996)
- Tim Moore — White Shadows (1977)
- André Moraes — Spiritual (2015)
- Gaby Moreno & Van Dyke Parks — ¡Spangled! (2019)
- Cindy Morgan — see Various Artists — Our Family (1993)
- Giorgio Moroder — Cat People (1982)
- Eliot Morris — What's Mine Is Yours (2006)
- Todd Mosby — American Heartland (2026)
- Mother Hen — Mother Hen (1971)
- Anne Murray — The Hottest Night of the Year (1982)
- Michael Martin Murphey — Michael Martin Murphey (1982)

=== N ===
- Tsuyoshi Nagabuchi — Captain Of The Ship (1993)
- Miyuki Nakajima:
  - Hi: Wings (1999)
  - Tsuki: Wings (1999)
  - Short Stories (2000)
  - Lullaby for the Soul (2001)
  - Otogibanashi: Fairy Ring (2002)
- Graham Nash:
  - Innocent Eyes (1986)
  - Over the Years (2018)
- Dan Navarro — Shed My Skin (2018)
- Sam Neely — Loving You Just Crossed My Mind (1972)
- Loey Nelson — Venus Kissed The Moon (1990)
- Willie Nelson — The Great Divide (2002)
- Aaron Neville:
  - Aaron Neville's Soulful Christmas (1993)
  - To Make Me Who I Am (1997)
- Randy Newman:
  - Land of Dreams (1988)
  - Randy Newman's Faust (1995)
- Joanna Newsom — Ys (2006)
- Juice Newton — Ain't Gonna Cry (1989)
- Wayne Newton — Tomorrow (1976)
- Olivia Newton-John — Making a Good Thing Better (1977)
- Nicol & Marsh — Nicol & Marsh (1978)
- Goro Noguchi:
  - Goro In Los Angeles, U.S.A. (1976)
  - Light Mellow Goro Noguchi (2014)

=== O ===
- The Oak Ridge Boys:
  - Heart Beat (1987)
  - Monongahela (1988)
- Scott Oatley — Lift You Up EP (2012)
- Alan O'Day:
  - Appetizers (1977)
  - Oh Johnny! (1979)
- Mike Oldfield — Man on the Rocks (2014)
- Steve Oliver — Pictures & Frames (2016)
- Nigel Olsson — Nigel Olsson (1975)
- Michael Omartian — Onward (Australia - 1975) aka Adam Again (1977)
- Antonio Orozco — Tocar El Corazón EP (2023)
- Robert Ellis Orrall — Flying Colors (1993)
- Fernando Ortega — Storm (2002)
- Judith Owen:
  - Ebb & Flow (2014)
  - Somebody's Child (2016)
  - redisCOVERed (2018)
  - The Here & Now (2020)
- Jamie Owens — Growing Pains (1975)

=== P ===
- Pamela — An Unbroken Hart (1977)
- Twila Paris — Perennial: Songs for the Seasons of Life (1998)
- Van Dyke Parks:
  - Moonlighting: Live at the Ash Grove (1998)
  - Songs Cycled (2013)
  - ¡Spangled! (2019) - collaboration with Gaby Moreno
- Duncan Parsons — On Earth, As It Is (2022)
- Dolly Parton:
  - 9 to 5 and Odd Jobs (1980)
  - Dolly, Dolly, Dolly (1980)
  - Heartbreak Express (1982)
  - Burlap & Satin (1983)
  - The Great Pretender (1984)
  - Rainbow (1987)
- Dolly Parton, Emmylou Harris, and Linda Ronstadt:
  - Trio (1987)
  - Trio II (1999)
  - The Complete Trio Collection (2016)
- Sandi Patty — see Various Artists — Our Family (1993)
- Laura Pausini:
  - Entre Tu y Mil Mares / Tra Te e il Mare (2000)
  - From The Inside (2002)
- Jennifer Perryman — Jennifer Perryman (2003)
- Herb Pedersen:
  - Southwest (1976)
  - Sandman (1977)
  - Lonesome Feeling (1984)
- Personnel (Ad Vanderveen) — Continuing Stories (1992)
- Bernadette Peters:
  - Bernadette Peters (1980)
  - Now Playing (1981)
  - Bernadette (1992)
- Colleen Peterson — Takin' My Boots Off (1978)
- Leslie Phillips — Beyond Saturday Night (1983)
- Shawn Phillips:
  - Faces (1972)
  - Bright White (1973)
  - Spaced (1977)
  - Transcendence (1978)
  - No Category (2003)
- Poco — Legacy (1989)
- Point of Grace:
  - Steady On (1998)
  - A Christmas Story (1999)
- Michel Polnareff:
  - Michel Polnareff (1975)
  - Un temps pour elle (2025)
- Steve Poltz — One Left Shoe (1998)
- Steve Porcaro — The Very Day (2025)
- Alisan Porter:
  - Who We Are (2014)
  - Race to Nowhere single (2026)
- Mike Post:
  - Television Theme Songs (1982)
  - Music from L.A. Law and Otherwise (1988)
- Steve Postell:
  - Time Still Knocking (2008)
  - Walking Through These Blues (2025)
- Billy Preston & Syreeta — Billy Preston & Syreeta (1981)
- Peter Pringle:
  - Pour Une Femme (1982)
  - Fifth Avenue Blue (1982)
- Jeff Pryor Band — Loverland (2003)
- Jim Pulte — Out Of The Window (1972)

=== R ===
- Bonnie Raitt — Nine Lives (1986)
- Eros Ramazzotti — Calma Apparente (2005)
- Willis Alan Ramsey — Willis Alan Ramsey (1972)
- Kenny Rankin:
  - Like A Seed (1972)
  - Hiding In Myself (1988)
- Collin Raye — Counting Sheep (2000)
- Helen Reddy:
  - Helen Reddy (1971)
  - I Am Woman (1972)
- Mike Reno — Renovation (2002)
- Cliff Richard — Songs from Heathcliff (1995)
- Randy Richards — Randy Richards (1978)
- Turley Richards — Expressions (1971)
- Alberto Rigoni — For the Love of Bass (2021)
- LeAnn Rimes:
  - Twisted Angel (2002)
  - What a Wonderful World (2004)
  - Family (2007)
- Lee Ritenour — Banded Together (1984)
- Johnny Rivers — Last Train to Memphis (1998)
- Véronique Rivière — Mojave (1992)
- Bruce Roberts — Cool Fool (1980)
- Rick Roberts — Windmills (1972)
- John "J.R." Robinson — Funkshui (2004)
- Ron — Quando Saro' Capace D'Amare (2008)
- Linda Ronstadt:
  - Don't Cry Now (1973)
  - Cry Like a Rainstorm, Howl Like the Wind (1989)
  - Winter Light (1993)
  - Feels Like Home (1995)
  - We Ran (1998)
  - Mi Jardin Azul: Las Canciones Favoritas (2004)
  - Duets (2014)
- Diana Ross:
  - Diana Ross (1976)
  - To Love Again (1981)
  - The Force Behind the Power (1991)
- Vasco Rossi — Buoni o Cattivi (2004)
- Michael Ruff — Speaking In Melodies (1993)
- Jennifer Rush — Heart Over Mind (1987)
- Brian & Brenda Russell — Word Called Love (1976)

=== S ===
- Katey Sagal — Room (2004)
- Carole Bayer Sager:
  - Carole Bayer Sager (1977)
  - ...Too (1978)
  - Sometimes Late at Night (1981)
- Yoshiyuki Sahashi — Trust Me (1994)
- Dick St. Nicklaus — Magic (1979)
- David Sanborn — Love Songs (1976)
- Marta Sánchez:
  - Desconocida (1998)
  - Soy Yo (2002)
- Evie Sands — Estate Of Mind (1974) (2012)
- Véronique Sanson:
  - Le maudit (1974)
  - Sans regrets (1992)
  - Zenith 93 (1993)
  - Comme ils l'imaginent (1995)
  - Indestructible (1998)
  - D'un papillon à une étoile (1999)
  - Avec Vous (2000)
  - Longue Distance (2004)
- Santana — Shaman (2002)
- Javier Santos - see Javier
- Hiroshi Satoh — Aqua (1988)
- Leo Sayer:
  - Endless Flight (1976)
  - Leo Sayer (1978)
- Joey Scarbury — America's Greatest Hero (1981)
- Harriet Schock:
  - Hollywood Town (1974)
  - She’s Low Clouds (1974)
  - You Don't Know What You're In For (1976)
- Darrell Scott — Family Tree (1999)
- Earl Scruggs — Earl Scruggs And Friends (2001)
- 2nd Chapter of Acts:
  - The Roar of Love (1980)
  - Singer Sower (1983)
  - Night Light (1985)
  - 20 (1992)
- The Section:
  - The Section (1972)
  - Forward Motion (1973)
  - Fork It Over (1977)
- Neil Sedaka:
  - Laughter In The Rain (1974)
  - Sedaka's Back (1974)
  - Overnight Success (titled The Hungry Years in some territories) (1975)
  - Steppin' Out (1976)
  - All You Need Is the Music (1978)
  - In the Pocket (1980)
- Dechen Shak-Dagsay — Day Tomorrow (2015)
- Feargal Sharkey — Wish (1988)
- Harry Shearer — Songs of the Bushmen (2008)
- Vonda Shepard:
  - By 7:30 (1999)
  - Heart and Soul: New Songs from Ally McBeal (1999)
- Hiroshi Shinkawa — Shinkies EP (2001)
- Sierra — Devotion (1996)
- Carly Simon — Playing Possum (1975)
- Patrick Simmons — Arcade (1983)
- Ricky Skaggs:
  - Love's Gonna Get Ya! (1986)
  - My Father's Son (1991)
- Michael W. Smith:
  - Michael W. Smith 2 (1984)
  - I'll Lead You Home (1995)
  - Christmastime (1998)
  - The Christmas Collection (2004)
- Tom Snow — Hungry Nights (1982)
- Errol Sober — Daydreamer (1976)
- Soleil Moon:
  - On The Way To Everything (2011 / 2012)
  - Warrior (2019)
- Jimmie Spheeris — The Original Tap Dancing Kid (1973)
- Spider — Labyrinths (1972)
- Scott Spiezio — see Various Artists — Big League Rocks (2000)
- Rick Springfield — Mission: Magic! (1974)
- Starland Vocal Band — Rear View Mirror (1977)
- Stealin Horses — Stealin Horses (1985)
- John Stewart — The Lonesome Picker Rides Again (1971)
- Rod Stewart:
  - Atlantic Crossing (1975)
  - A Night on the Town (1976)
  - A Spanner in the Works (1995)
  - Still the Same... Great Rock Classics of Our Time (2006)
  - Soulbook (2009)
- Stephen Stills:
  - Stills (1975)
  - Turnin' Back the Pages (2003)
  - Carry On (2013)
- Sting — Duets (2021)
- George Strait:
  - Ocean Front Property (1987)
  - Strait Out of the Box (1995)
- Barbra Streisand:
  - Emotion (1984)
  - A Love Like Ours (1999)
  - The Secret of Life: Partners, Volume Two (2025)
- Marty Stuart — Hillbilly Rock (1989)
- Studio D'Lux — Nothing (2025)
- Daryl Stuermer:
  - Steppin' Out (1988)
  - Live & Learn (1998)
  - GO! (2006)
- Kiyotaka Sugiyama — Moonset (1991)
- Donna Summer — The Wanderer (1980)
- Lyle Swedeen — Sunshine Inside (1974)
- Nick Swisher — Believe (2011)
- Syreeta — see Billy Preston & Syreeta (1981)

=== T ===
- Steven T. — West Coast Confidential (1978)
- T-Square — New Road, Old Way (2002)
- Mariya Takeuchi:
  - Love Songs (1980)
  - Re-Collection (1984)
- John Michael Talbot & Terry Talbot with The London Chamber Orchestra — The Painter (1980)
- The Talbot Bros. — The Talbot Bros. (1974)
- James Taylor:
  - Mud Slide Slim and the Blue Horizon (1971)
  - One Man Dog (1972)
  - Gorilla (1975)
  - Greatest Hits (1976)
  - In the Pocket (1976)
  - JT (1977)
  - Flag (1979)
  - Dad Loves His Work (1981)
  - That's Why I'm Here (1985)
  - Never Die Young (1988)
  - Live in Rio (1986/1991)
  - Greatest Hits Volume 2 (2000)
  - The Best of James Taylor (2003)
  - Live at the Troubadour (2010)
- Kate Taylor:
  - Sister Kate (1971)
  - Why Wait (2021)
- Livingston Taylor:
  - There You Are Again (2005)
  - Last Alaska Moon (2010)
- Rod Taylor — Rod Taylor (1973)
- B. J. Thomas — Back Against the Wall (1992)
- Paul Thorn — Hammer and Nail (1997)
- Billy Bob Thornton — Beautiful Door (2007)
- Billy Thorpe:
  - Children Of The Sun (1979)
  - 21st Century Man (1980)
  - Stimulation (1981)
- Pam Thum- — Feel The Healing (1995)
- Martin Tillman — Superhuman (2016)
- Toto:
  - Falling in Between Live (2007)
  - Toto XIV (2015)
  - Treasures: A Vinyl Collection (2019)
- Dennis Tracy — Show Biz (1974)
- TRW — Rivers Of Paradise (2007)
- Tanya Tucker — Should I Do It (1981)
- Michelle Tumes — Dream (2001)
- John Lovick Turner — Rookie Of The Year a.k.a. John Lovick Turner (1973)
- Steve Tyrell — A Song For You (2018)

=== V ===
- Lamont Van Hook — My Name Is Lamont Van Hook (2024)
- Rafe Van Hoy — Prisoner Of The Sky (1980)
- Various Artists:
  - No Nukes: The Muse Concerts for a Non-Nuclear Future (1979)
  - Two Rooms: Celebrating the Songs of Elton John & Bernie Taupin (1991)
  - A Very Special Christmas 2 (1992)
  - Music From The Television Show "The Heights" (1992)
  - Re-Import (Guide Of The Japanese Music) (1992)
  - Common Thread: The Songs of the Eagles (1993)
  - Love Stories 2 (1993)
  - Our Family (1993)
  - Catwalk - Music From The TV Series (1994)
  - Randy Newman's Faust (1995)
  - David Garfield And Friends - Tribute To Jeff Porcaro (1997)
  - Return of the Grievous Angel: A Tribute to Gram Parsons (1999)
  - Big League Rocks (2000)
  - Banjoman: A Tribute To Derroll Adams (2002)
  - Flashback - Million Hits Cover On TV (2003)
  - Kadomatsu T's Songs From L.A. - The Pop Covers Collection (2004)
  - A Tribute To Nicolette Larson: Lotta Love Concert (2006)
  - Maestros Of Cool: A Tribute To Steely Dan (2006)
  - E35 - Let's Sing J-Pop In English (2008)
  - E35 II - Let's Sing J-Pop In English (2008)
  - Raiding The Rock Vault: Songs From The Vault (Volume I) (2013)
  - Raiding The Rock Vault: Songs From The Vault (Volume 2) (2014)
  - Looking Into You: A Tribute to Jackson Browne (2014)
  - AOR AGE Presents GEMS & RARITIES (2018)
  - Summer Girls Vol. 1: Lost Sunshine Pop Gems of the 1960s (2020)
- Sylvie Vartan — Vent D'ouest (1992)
- Anna Vissi — Everything I Am (2000)
- Roger Voudouris — Radio Dream (1979)

=== W ===
- Wendy Waldman:
  - Love Has Got Me (1973)
  - Love Is The Only Goal: The Best Of Wendy Waldman (1996)
- Billy Joe Walker Jr.:
  - Universal Language (1988)
  - Painting Music (1989)
- Clay Walker:
  - Clay Walker (1993)
  - Live, Laugh, Love (1999)
  - A Few Questions (2003)
- Jamie Walters:
  - Jamie Walters (1994)
  - Ride (1997)
- Steve Wariner — I Should Be with You (1988)
- Jennifer Warnes — The Well (2001)
- Dionne Warwick — Hot! Live and Otherwise (1981)
- Wayne Watson — How Time Flies (1992)
- The Weather Girls — Success (1983)
- Jimmy Webb:
  - Angel Heart (1982)
  - Suspending Disbelief (1993)
  - Angel Heart - 35th Anniversary Expanded Edition (2017)
- The Webb Sisters — Savages (2010)
- Tim Weisberg — Outrageous Temptations (1989)
- Larry Weiss — Black & Blue Suite (1974)
- Cory Wells — Ahead Of The Storm (1978)
- Bernhard Welz — Stay Tuned 1.5 - Charity Allstar album for the Linda McCartney Centre (2016)
- Joe Wilkinson — Fences (2025)
- Andy Williams — Andy (1976)
- Bernie Williams:
  - The Journey Within (2003)
  - Moving Forward (2009)
- Deniece Williams — Gonna Take a Miracle: The Best of Deniece Williams (1996)
- Joseph Williams — Denizen Tenant (2021)
- Paul Williams:
  - Just an Old Fashioned Love Song (1971)
  - Life Goes On (1972)
  - Here Comes Inspiration (1974)
  - Classics (1977)
  - Back to Love Again (1999)
- Robbie Williams — Escapology (2002)
- Mark Williamson — Time Slipping By (1994)
- Kelly Willis — Bang Bang (1991)
- Brian Wilson and Van Dyke Parks — Orange Crate Art (1995)
- Carnie & Wendy Wilson — Hey Santa! (1993)
- Wilson Phillips:
  - Shadows and Light (1992)
  - California (2004)
- The Wilsons — The Wilsons (1997)
- Jim Wilson — Cape Of Good Hope (2001)
- BeBe Winans — see Various Artists — Our Family (1993)
- Lee Ann Womack — Something Worth Leaving Behind (2002)
- Tom Wopat — Tom Wopat (1983)
- Lorna Wright — Circle Of Love (1978)
- Syreeta Wright — see Billy Preston & Syreeta (1981)

=== Y ===
- Junko Yagami — I Wanna Make A Hit Wit-Choo (1983)
- Junko Yamamoto — Slow Down (1995)
- Trisha Yearwood — Everybody Knows (1996)
- Takuro Yoshida — Long Time No See (1995)
- Jesse Colin Young — Walk the Talk (2003)
- Kenny Young — Last Stage For Silverworld (1973)

=== Z ===
- Jordon Zadorozny — see Blinker the Star
- Warren Zevon:
  - Excitable Boy (1978)
  - Bad Luck Streak in Dancing School (1980)
  - The Envoy (1982)
  - A Quiet Normal Life: The Best of Warren Zevon (1986)
  - Sentimental Hygiene (1987)
  - I'll Sleep When I'm Dead (An Anthology) (1996)
  - Genius: The Best of Warren Zevon (2002)
- Patti Zlaket — Dance Again (2026)
- Zulema — Ms. Z. (1973)

== Selected film and television soundtracks ==
- The A-Team (TV Main Theme) — (1983)
- ALF (TV Main Theme) — (1986)
- Annabelle's Wish (Motion picture soundtrack) — (1997)
- Birdy (Motion picture soundtrack) — (1985)
- Black Dog (Motion picture soundtrack) — (1998)
- Bounce (Motion picture soundtrack) — (2000)
- The Brady Bunch Movie (Motion picture soundtrack) — (1995)
- California Dreams (Television soundtrack) — (1992)
- Cat People (Motion picture soundtrack) — (1982)
- Catwalk (Television soundtrack) — (1994)
- Conspiracy Theory (Motion picture soundtrack) — (1997)
- Coyote Ugly (Motion picture soundtrack) — (2000)
- Doctor Detroit (Motion picture soundtrack) — (1983)
- Dr. T & the Women (Motion picture soundtrack) — (2000)
- Doogie Howser, M.D. (TV Main Theme) — (1989)
- For Love of the Game (Motion picture soundtrack) — (1999)
- The Golden Girls (Television soundtrack) — (1985)
- The Greatest American Hero (TV Main Theme) — (1981)
  - Theme from The Greatest American Hero (Believe It or Not)
- Groundhog Day (Motion picture soundtrack) — (1993)
- Hill Street Blues (TV Main Theme) — (1981)
- Hunter (TV Main Theme) — (1984)
- Jimi: All Is by My Side (Motion picture soundtrack) — (2013)
- Kindergarten Cop (Motion picture soundtrack) — (1990)
- L.A. Law (TV Main Theme) — (1988)
- Legally Blonde (Motion picture soundtrack) — (2001)
- Lipstick (Motion Picture soundtrack) — (1976)
- Love Maximum (Motion picture soundtrack) — (1994)
- Magnum P.I. (TV Main Theme) — (1980)
- Mahogany (Motion picture soundtrack) — (1975)
- Message in a Bottle (Motion picture soundtrack) — (1999)
- Metropolis (Motion picture soundtrack) — (1984)
- Muppets Most Wanted (Motion picture soundtrack) — (2014)
- Phantom of the Paradise (Motion picture soundtrack) — (1974)
- The Pirates of Penzance (Motion picture soundtrack) — (1981)
- The Postman (Motion picture soundtrack) — (1997)
- The Prince of Egypt (Motion picture soundtrack) — (1998)
- The Pursuit Of D.B. Cooper (Motion picture soundtrack) — (1981)
- Quantum Leap (TV Main Theme) — (1989)
- Rhinestone (Motion picture soundtrack) — (1984)
- The Rockford Files (TV Main Theme) — (1974)
- Sleepwalkers (Motion picture soundtrack) — (1992)
- Tenspeed and Brown Shoe (Television soundtrack) — (1980)
- Tilt (Motion picture soundtrack) — (1979)
- What Women Want (Motion picture soundtrack) — (2000)

== Selected film appearances ==
- Rhinestone (Actor: Rhinestone House Band, as Lee Sklar) — (1984)
- Ticker (Actor: Blues Band Bass) — (2001)
