= First Love (2004 documentary film) =

2004 American concert film and documentary

First Love: A Historic Gathering of Jesus Music Pioneers is a 2004 concert film and documentary that looks back into the Jesus Music of the 1970s. In 1997, a group of Jesus Music pioneers gathered in southern California for three days of music and fellowship. The event was both recorded and filmed, and was released in a 2-CD/2-DVD set simply titled First Love: A Historic Gathering of Jesus Music Pioneers. It was compiled and edited by the spouses of two of the artists who appear in the documentary: Dan Collins (husband of Jamie Owens-Collins) and Steve Greisen (husband of Nelly Greisen (2nd Chapter of Acts)) produced the project. The CD contains each of the 31 songs that were performed during the gathering, and the DVDs shows the live performances of the songs, interviews with the individual performers and groups, interviews with others who were involved in the roots of Jesus Music, and rare pictures and footage of the artists from the 1970s. Other artists who were interviewed for the documentary include pastor Chuck Smith, Pat Boone, Phil Keaggy, and Michael Omartian, among others.

== Performances ==
Disc 1

1. "Welcome Back" (Love Song)
2. "Two Hands" (Love Song)
3. "Happy Road" (Barry McGuire)
4. "Seeds of Love" (Barry McGuire)
5. "The Victor" (Jamie Owens-Collins)
6. "Seasons of the Soul" (Jamie Owens-Collins)
7. "Easter Song" (2nd Chapter of Acts)
8. "Which Way the Wind Blows" (2nd Chapter of Acts)
9. "Let's Have a Good Time" (Terry Clark)
10. "Jesus Mighty Fortress" (Terry Clark)
11. "Sometimes Alleluia" (Chuck Girard)
12. "My Redeemer" (Annie Herring)
13. "There is a Redeemer" (Keith Green tribute)
14. "O Lord, You're Beautiful Medley" (Keith Green tribute)
15. "Born Again" (Keith Green tribute)

Disc 2

1. "King of Hearts" (Randy Stonehill)
2. "Abandon Your Heart" (Randy Stonehill)
3. "Million Dollar Feeling" (Darrell Mansfield)
4. "Stand by Me" (Darrell Mansfield)
5. "All Day Song" (John Fischer)
6. "Jesus Loves Even Me" (John Fischer)
7. "To the King" (Matthew Ward)
8. "Didn't He" (Randy Matthews)
9. "Ti Chapé" (Randy Matthews)
10. "Abide" (Paul Clark)
11. "Where Did I Fall Down?" (Paul Clark)
12. "Clean Before My Lord" (Nancy Honeytree)
13. "Pioneer" (Nancy Honeytree)
14. "I Don't Know Why" (Jesus Loved Me)" (Andraé Crouch)
15. "I Will Lift Up Mine Eyes" (Andraé Crouch)
16. "Bless His Holy Name" (Andraé Crouch)

== Personnel ==
- Paul Clark: Performer
- Terry Clark: Performer
- Dan Collins: Producer, Event Coordinator
- Jamie Owens-Collins: Performer
- Tommy Coomes: Performer (Love Song)
- Andrae Crouch: Performer
- John Fischer: Performer
- Chuck Girard: Performer, Performer (Love Song)
- Melody Green-Sievreit: Vicarious Performer
- Nelly Greisen: Extra Backup Vocals, Performer (2nd Chapter of Acts)
- Steve Greisen: Video Producer
- Annie Herring: Performer, Performer (2nd Chapter of Acts)
- Nancy Honeytree: Performer
- Darrell Mansfield: Performer
- Randy Matthews: Performer
- Barry McGuire: Performer
- Randy Stonehill: Performer
- Jay Truax: Performer (Love Song)
- Bob Wall: Performer (Love Song)
- Matthew Ward: Backup Vocals, Performer, Performer (2nd Chapter of Acts)

== Awards ==
- 1998 International Communicator Award
- 1999 Telly Award
