= How the West Was One (2nd Chapter of Acts, Phil Keaggy and a band called David album) =

1977 album

Live album by 2nd Chapter of Acts, Phil Keaggy and a band called David
- Released: 1977
- Genre: Contemporary Christian music
- Label: Myrrh
- Producer: Buck Herring

2nd Chapter of Acts chronology
To the Bride (1975)	How the West Was One (1977)	Mansion Builder (1978)

Phil Keaggy chronology
Emerging (1977)	How the West Was One (1977)	The Master and the Musician (1978)

a band called David chronology
To the Bride (1975)	How the West Was One (1977)

How the West Was One, released in 1977, is a three-LP live album featuring 2nd Chapter of Acts, Phil Keaggy and a band called David. The album was a collection of songs recorded in a series of 18 concerts held throughout the western United States in 1977. It was also 2nd Chapter of Acts' final release for Myrrh Records.

Half the album (sides 1, 5 and 6) was performed by 2nd Chapter of Acts and half by Phil Keaggy. The two artists backed each other up throughout. Besides material from previous albums by both artists, the album features two songs from Annie Herring's first solo album Through a Child's Eyes and three otherwise unavailable songs (one each by Keaggy, Matthew Ward with Richard Souther, and Herring).

== Track listing ==
From Discogs.

Side one

1. Concert Intro – 2:26
2. "Hey, Whatcha Say" – 3:38
3. Song Intro – 0:34
4. "Keep On Shinin'" – 3:27
5. Song Intro – 1:08
6. "I Fall in Love/Change" – 4:43
7. "Now That I Belong to You" – 3:43
8. Phil's Intro – 0:23

Side two

1. Song Intro – 0:42
2. "What a Day" – 5:56
3. Song Intro – 1:00
4. "Love Broke Thru" – 3:37
5. Song Intro – 0:27
6. "Take Me Closer" – 5:07
7. Song Intro – 0:23
8. "My Life" – 5:39

Side three

1. Song Intro – 0:07
2. "Another Try" – 5:25
3. Song Intro – 0:17
4. "Rejoice" – 16:22

Side four

1. Song Intro – 0:03
2. "Just the Same" – 4:08
3. Song Intro – 0:06
4. "Hallelujah" – 5:47
5. "Time" – 9:44

Side five

1. Song Intro – 1:10
2. "Easter Song" – 3:45
3. Song Intro – 1:02
4. "Dance With You" – 3:08
5. "Which Way the Wind Blows" – 4:44
6. Song Intro – 2:44
7. "Something Tells Me" – 3:52

Side six

1. "Yaweh" – 3:24
2. Song Intro – 1:46
3. "PS 61" – 2:32
4. "Grinding Stone" – 2:43
5. "Receive" – 3:52
6. Song Intro – 0:30
7. Medley: "Morning Comes When You Call" and "The Son Comes Over the Hill" – 6:20

== Personnel ==
- Wally Duguid – engineer
- Nelly Greisen – vocals
- Gene Gunnels – drums
- Annie Herring – piano, vocals
- Buck Herring – producer, mixer, concert intro
- Phil Keaggy – guitar, vocals
- Herb Melton – bass
- Richard Souther – piano, multi-keyboards, background vocals
- Matthew Ward – vocals
- Peter York – rhythm guitar, background vocals
