= Encores (2nd Chapter of Acts album) =

Compilation album by 2nd Chapter of Acts
- Released: June 1, 1981
- Genre: Jesus music
- Length: 35:09
- Label: Myrrh
- Producer: Buck Herring

2nd Chapter of Acts chronology
The Roar of Love (1980)	Encores (1981)	Rejoice (1981)

Encores is the debut compilation album by the Christian group 2nd Chapter of Acts. It collects songs from their first two Myrrh Records albums, With Footnotes and In the Volume of the Book.

== Track listing ==
No.	Title	Length
1.	"Which Way the Wind Blows"	4:58
2.	"Easter Song"	2:20
3.	"Last Day of My Life"	3:08
4.	"Psalm 63"	1:51
5.	"Prince Song"	3:27
6.	"Hey Whatcha' Say"	3:20
7.	"Yaweh"	3:07
8.	"Morning Comes When You Call"	3:10
9.	"Love, Peace, Joy"	2:38
10.	"He Loves Me"	5:07
11.	"The Son Comes Over the Hill"	3:23
Total length:		35:09
