= To the Bride =

Live album by Barry McGuire, 2nd Chapter of Acts and a band called David
- Released: 1975
- Recorded: July 19, 1975; July 26, 1975; August 2, 1975; August 9, 1975
- Genre: Jesus music, contemporary Christian music
- Label: Myrrh
- Producer: Buck Herring

Barry McGuire chronology
| Jubilation (1975) | To the Bride (1975) | Eve of Destruction (Star Power) (1975) |

2nd Chapter of Acts chronology
| In the Volume of the Book (1975) | To the Bride (1975) | How the West Was One (1977) |

a band called David chronology
| To the Bride (1975) | How the West Was One (1977) |

To the Bride, released in 1975, is a two-LP live album featuring Barry McGuire, 2nd Chapter of Acts, and a band called David. The album was culled from four concerts performed in the summer of 1975 and is the first of two live albums that 2nd Chapter of Acts recorded for Myrrh Records, although the majority of the concert is performed by McGuire. The album was re-released on two CDs in 2007 with one song excluded.

== Track listing ==
=== Side one ===
1. "Intro" † – 0:56
2. "Come to Praise the Lord" – 3:30
3. "Little Bitty Dude" † – 3:23
4. "He's Coming Back" – 4:52
5. "Sad Song" † – 2:36
6. "Happy Road" – 3:33
7. "Acts Intro" † – 2:23

=== Side two ===
1. "Which Way's the Light" – 2:03
2. "Love, Peace, Joy" – 2:38
3. "Layers" † – 1:05
4. "I Wonder" – 1:55
5. "Ogre" † – 0:51
6. "Am I Seeing You" – 2:15
7. "Denomination Blues" – 2:43 (Washington Phillips song, omitted from the CD version)
8. "A Friend" †" – 0:18
9. "Jimmy's Song" – 2:33
10. "Snow White" † – 1:36
11. "Prince Song" – 3:27

=== Side three ===
1. "He Alone Is Worthy" – 0:46 (chorus of O Come All Ye Faithful with modified lyrics; continuation of "Prince Song" coda)
2. "Easter Song" – 2:34
3. "He Is Coming" – 3:18
4. "Anyone But Jesus" – 4:10
5. "The Only Way" † – 1:53
6. "Sing the Melody" – 3:22
7. "Shock Absorbers" † – 1:55
8. "Chosen Generation" – 3:25

=== Side four ===
1. "Jesus People" – 2:33
2. "I Walked a Mile" – 4:26
3. "Dolphins" † – 4:27
4. "Callin' Me Home" – 3:54
5. "Each Other" † – 0:13
6. "Doesn't That Bible Say" – 4:25
7. "Brainwashed" † – 0:49
8. "Doesn't That Bible Say" (reprise) – 1:52

† Spoken song introductions.

Side two and the first three tracks of side three are performed by the 2nd Chapter of Acts. The majority of these songs do not appear on any of their other albums.

== Personnel ==
- Buck Herring – producer, mixer
- Wally Duguid – engineer
- Gary Bonar – assistant engineers
- Phil Stephen – assistant engineers
- Barry McGuire – vocals, guitar
- Annie Herring – piano, vocals
- Nelly Greisen – vocals
- Matthew Ward – vocals
- Jack Kelly – drums
- Paul Offenbacher – guitars
- Rick Azim – guitars
- Herb Melton – bass
- Richard Souther – piano, multi-keyboards, background vocals
- Peter York – rhythm guitar, background vocals
- Jerry Melrose – concert coordinator
