= WOW Gold =

Compilation album by Various artists
- Released: June 20, 2000
- Genre: CCM
- Label: Brentwood

Professional ratings
Review scores
Source	Rating
Allmusic	5/5 stars

WOW Gold was released in 2000 and is part of the WOW series. It was a landmark two-album collection of thirty contemporary Christian music hits ranging from the 1970s to the time it was released. Marketing and distribution responsibilities for this title in the WOW series was relegated to Brentwood Records, part of the Provident Label Group. The compilation reached No. 111 on the Billboard 200 chart in 2000, and No. 3 on the Top Contemporary Christian album chart. Album sales were certified as gold in the US in 2000 by the Recording Industry Association of America (RIAA).

== Track listings and artists ==
=== Disc one ===
No.	Title	Artist	Length
1.	"Flood" (from Jars of Clay, 1995)	Jars of Clay	3:31
2.	"I'm Not Ashamed" (from Not Ashamed, 1992)	Newsboys	3:46
3.	"Testify to Love" (from A Maze of Grace, 1997)	Avalon	3:54
4.	"Stomp" (from God's Property, 1997)	God's Property featuring Kirk Franklin	5:35
5.	"What If I Stumble?" (from Jesus Freak, 1995)	dc Talk	5:05
6.	"God" (from God, 1996)	Rebecca St. James	4:07
7.	"I Could Sing of Your Love Forever" (from Cutting Edge, 1994)	Delirious?	6:07
8.	"Awesome God" (from Winds of Heaven, Stuff of Earth, 1988)	Rich Mullins	3:03
9.	"You Put This Love in My Heart" (from For Him Who Has Ears to Hear, 1977)	Keith Green	3:26
10.	"Why Should the Devil Have All the Good Music?" (from Only Visiting This Planet, 1972)	Larry Norman	2:25
11.	"To Hell with the Devil" (from To Hell with the Devil, 1986)	Stryper	4:04
12.	"Beyond Belief" (from Beyond Belief, 1990)	Petra	5:03
13.	"The Call" (from The Call, 1995)	Anointed	4:04
14.	"The Champion" (from The Champion, 1985)	Carman	6:53
15.	"We Will Stand" (from Walls of Glass, 1983)	Russ Taff	4:37

- The song "The Champion" by Carman original version appears on his fifth album The Champion, the version on WOW Gold is a live version taken from the 1993 compilation album The Absolute Best.

=== Disc two ===
No.	Title	Artist	Length
1.	"For the Sake of the Call" (from For the Sake of the Call, 1990)	Steven Curtis Chapman	5:25
2.	"He Is Exalted" (from Kingdom Seekers, 1985)	Twila Paris	3:43
3.	"Thy Word" (from Straight Ahead, 1984)	Amy Grant	3:19
4.	"Butterfly Kisses" (from Butterfly Kisses (Shades of Grace), 1997)	Bob Carlisle	5:38
5.	"Basics of Life" (from The Basics of Life, 1992)	4Him	5:12
6.	"Love Takes Time" (from Mercy, 1992)	Bryan Duncan	3:47
7.	"Friends" (from The Michael W. Smith Project, 1983)	Michael W. Smith	4:40
8.	"Easter Song" (from With Footnotes, 1974)	2nd Chapter of Acts	2:23
9.	"Love Broke Thru" (from Love Broke Thru, 1976)	Phil Keaggy	3:31
10.	"Rise Again" (from Dallas Holm & Praise Live, 1977)	Dallas Holm & Praise	4:21
11.	"We Shall Behold Him" (from Love Overflowing, 1981)	Sandi Patty	6:25
12.	"Praise the Lord" (from Heed the Call, 1979)	The Imperials	3:30
13.	"My Tribute" (from Keep On Singin', 1971)	Andraé Crouch & The Disciples	3:32
14.	"Undivided" (from Undivided, 1986)	First Call	4:14
15.	"Thank You" (from Thank You, 1988)	Ray Boltz	5:43

- The song "We Shall Behold Him" by Sandi Patty original version appears on her second album Love Overflowing, the version on WOW Gold is a live version as the closing song to her 1983 live album More Than Wonderful.
