= Mansion Builder =

Studio album by 2nd Chapter of Acts
- Released: 1978
- Studio: Buckskin Studios in Northridge, California
- Genre: Contemporary Christian music
- Length: 33:01
- Label: Sparrow
- Producer: Buck Herring

2nd Chapter of Acts chronology
How the West Was One (1977)	Mansion Builder (1978)	The Roar of Love (1980)

Mansion Builder, released in 1978, is the third studio album from contemporary Christian music group 2nd Chapter of Acts, their first for the recently created Sparrow Records. Members of 2nd Chapter of Acts' touring band, a band called David, also perform on this album.

== Track listing ==
All tracks are written by Anne Herring except where noted.

Side one
No.	Title	Lyrics	Music	Length
1.	"Rod and Staff"			2:59
2.	"Mansion Builder"			3:11
3.	"Ps. 93"	New American Standard Bible	Matthew Ward, Richard Souther	2:37
4.	"Gold in the Clouds"			2:24
5.	"I'll Give My Life Away"			2:24
6.	"Rainbow"			2:36
Total length:				16:11

Side two
No.	Title	Writer(s)	Length
1.	"Well, Haven't You Heard"		3:56
2.	"Lightning Flash"		3:13 (Note: Incorrectly listed as 2:45.)
3.	"Starlight, Starbright"		3:13 (Note: Incorrectly listed as 2:00.)
4.	"Make My Life a Prayer to You"	Melody Green	3:06
5.	"Daydreamer"		3:22
Total length:			16:50

== Personnel ==
- Gene Gunnels – drums
- Peter York – guitar
- Herb Melton – bass
- Richard Souther – piano, keyboards, clavinet, organ, mini-moog
- Annie Herring – piano
- Bill Maxwell – drums
- Abraham Laboriel – bass
- Jay Graydon – guitar
- Michael Omartian – Aarpvark, piano, percussion
- Buck Herring – producer, engineer
