= Hymns II (2nd Chapter of Acts album) =

Studio album by 2nd Chapter of Acts
- Released: 1988
- Studios: Easter Song Studio (Garden Valley, Texas) and Rosewood Studio (Tyler, Texas)
- Genre: Contemporary Christian music
- Length: 46:15
- Label: Live Oak
- Producer: Buck Herring

2nd Chapter of Acts chronology
Far Away Places (1987)	Hymns II (1988)	Hymns Instrumental (1989)

Hymns II is the second collection of hymns and the fourteenth and final studio album from 2nd Chapter of Acts, released in 1988. 2nd Chapter of Acts provided the vocals in this release. Annie Herring wrote "Purify Me".

== Track listing ==
Original release
No.	Title	Length
1.	"Medley: "Turn Your Eyes Upon Jesus" / "Praise to the Lord, the Almighty" / "All Hail the Power of Jesus' Name" / "Doxology""	3:42
2.	"It Is Well with My Soul"	6:08
3.	"This Is My Father's World"	3:38
4.	"O for a Thousand Tongues"	4:11
5.	"Morning Has Broken"	4:11
6.	"Be Still, My Soul"	5:15
7.	"A Mighty Fortress is Our God"	4:30
8.	"Come, Thou Long-Expected Jesus"	4:50
9.	"O Sacred Head, Now Wounded"	5:08
10.	"Purify Me"	2:02

1993 reissue
No.	Title	Length
11.	"O Worship the King"	4:00
Total length:		46:15

== Personnel ==
2nd Chapter of Acts

- Annie Herring – vocals, vocal arrangements
- Nelly Greisen – vocals, vocal arrangements
- Matthew Ward – vocals, vocal arrangements

Musicians

- John Andrew Schreiner – keyboards, acoustic piano, instrumental arrangements
- Michael Thompson – guitars
- Lee Jones – bass
- Dennis Holt – drums

=== Production ===
- Buck Herring – producer, mixing
- Dan Willard – vocal production, engineer, mixing
- Greg Hunt – engineer, mixing
- Bradley Grose – art direction, design, Illustration
- Buddy Owens – cover concept
- Vern Fisher – calligraphy
- Michael Going – photography
