= Hymns (2nd Chapter of Acts album) =

Studio album by 2nd Chapter of Acts
- Released: 1986
- Genre: Contemporary Christian
- Label: Live Oak
- Producer: Buck Herring

2nd Chapter of Acts chronology
Night Light (1985)	Hymns (1986)	Far Away Places (1987)

Hymns is the 1986 studio album by 2nd Chapter of Acts.

== Track listing ==
From Discogs.

1. "All Creatures of Our God and King" – 2:58
2. "My Jesus I Love Thee" – 4:52
3. "Great Is Thy Faithfulness" (Thomas Chisholm, William M. Runyan) – 4:04
4. "Joyful, Joyful, We Adore Thee" – 2:40
5. "Crown Him With Many Crowns" – 3:46
6. "Take My Life And Let It Be" – 1:45
7. "Holy, Holy, Holy" – 5:38
8. "Fairest Lord Jesus" – 3:47
9. "Oh the Deep, Deep Love of Jesus" – 4:08
10. "How Great Thou Art" (Stuart K. Hine) – 5:22
11. "He Has Formed Me" (Annie Herring) – 1:39

== Personnel ==
2nd Chapter of Acts

- Annie Herring – vocals, vocal arrangements
- Nelly Greisen – vocals, vocal arrangements
- Matthew Ward – vocals, vocal arrangements

Musicians

- John Andrew Schreiner – keyboards, instrumental arrangements
- Will McFarland – guitar (8)
- Lee Jones – bass
- Dennis Holt – drums

Production

- Buck Herring – producer, engineer at Easter Song Studios, Garden Valley, Texas
- Greg Hunt – engineer
- Bernie Grundman – mastering at Bernie Grundman Mastering, Hollywood, California
- Buddy Owens – art direction, cover concept
- Marty Justice – back cover artwork
- Bradley Grose – design
- Michael Stevens – calligraphy
- Michael Going – photography
