= Rejoice (2nd Chapter of Acts album) =

Studio album by 2nd Chapter of Acts
- Released: 1981
- Studio: Buckskin Studio (Northridge, California).
- Genre: Contemporary Christian music
- Producer: Buck Herring

2nd Chapter of Acts chronology
Encores (1981)	Rejoice (1981)	Singer Sower (1983)

Rejoice is an album by contemporary Christian music band 2nd Chapter of Acts released in 1981.

== Track listing ==
From Discogs.

All songs were written by Annie Herring, except "Bread of Life", "Rise Up and Take a Bow" and "Bread of Life (Reprise)", which were written by Annie Herring and Matthew Ward.

1. Rejoice – 3:00
2. Bread of Life – 2:04
3. Nobody Can Take My Life – 3:28
4. Here I Go – 2:18
5. Rise Up and Take a Bow – 2:00
6. I've Got a Break in My Heart – 2:47
7. Don't Understand It – 2:57
8. He's My Source – 2:23
9. Heaven Came to Earth – 2:15
10. Will You Remember Me – 3:25
11. Mountain Tops – 2:54
12. Bread of Life (Reprise) – 1:08

== Personnel ==
2nd Chapter of Acts

- Annie Herring – acoustic piano, synthesizers, vocals
- Nelly Ward – vocals
- Matthew Ward – vocals

Musicians

- Kerry Livgren – pianos, synthesizers, guitars
- Greg Springer – synthesizers
- Peter York – guitars
- Herb Melton – bass
- Jack Kelly – drums
- David Kemper – drums

=== Production ===
- Buck Herring – producer, engineer
- Ron Brent – graphics, layout
- David J. Pavol – photography
