= Paul Clark (Christian musician) =

American singer

- Origin: Kansas City, Missouri, U.S.
- Genres: Jesus music, folk rock
- Instrument: Guitar
- Years active: 1972–present
- Formerly of: Paul Clark & Friends
- Website: paulclarkmusic.com

Paul Clark is a musician who was involved in the Jesus music movement and early contemporary Christian music industry. He was born in Kansas City and recorded his first album in 1972, Songs from the Saviour Vol 1. Its songs became one of the first signs of the growing "Jesus movement" of the early 70s.

He went on to record further albums including Songs from the Savior - Volume Two, Come Into His Presence and Good To Be Home with Paul Clark and Friends (including Phil Keaggy, Jay Truax, John Mehler, Bill Speer, Mike Burhart, and others) then launched the award-winning 1976 album Hand to the Plow which was well received. In 1978 he released Change in the Wind and in 1980 with Aim for the Heart. The three albums had some jazz influences and were well-produced in the context of other Christian music of the time. Aim for the Heart featured Abraham Laboriel on bass along with Harlan Rogers, Hadley Hockensmith and Bill Maxwell and was jazz influenced. The four became members of Koinonia jazz band from 1982 to 1990.

Clark is recognized as being one of the founding fathers of the Jesus Movement and the contemporary Christian music industry. During his 13-year association with Word Records in the 1970s and 1980s, Clark's songwriting, record producing and performances placed him in the forefront along with artists like Phil Keaggy, 2nd Chapter of Acts, Love Song, Larry Norman, Andraé Crouch, Honeytree, Keith Green, Randy Stonehill, Barry McGuire, and many notable others.

== Discography ==
- Songs from the Savior, Vol. 1 1972
- Songs from the Savior, Vol. 2 1973
- Come Into His Presence (Paul Clark and Friends) 1974
- Good To Be Home (Paul Clark and Friends) 1975
- Hand to the Plow 1976
- Change in the Wind 1978
- Aim for the Heart 1980
- New Horizon 1981
- Drawn to the Light 1982
- Out of the Shadow 1984
- Awakening from the Western Dream 1988
- When the Moon is Behind the Clouds 1992
- Private World 1995
- Christmas With Paul Clark 1998
- Call of the Canyon 2001
- Approaching Jerusalem 2009
- Down at the Whistle Stop 2014
- Branching Roots 2016
