= Hymns Instrumental =

Studio album by 2nd Chapter of Acts
- Released: 1989
- Genre: Contemporary Christian, instrumental
- Length: 73:27
- Label: Live Oak
- Producer: Buck Herring

2nd Chapter of Acts chronology
Hymns II (1988)	Hymns Instrumental (1989)	20 (1992)

Hymns Instrumental, released in 1989, is the final studio album from contemporary Christian music group 2nd Chapter of Acts. It features no vocals, but is an instrumental collection of all but three of the tracks from the previous two Hymns releases.

== Track listing ==
1. "Medley" ("Turn Your Eyes Upon Jesus" / "Praise to the Lord, the Almighty" / "All Hail the Power of Jesus' Name" / "Doxology") - 3:43
2. "It Is Well with My Soul" - 6:08
3. "This is My Father's World" - 3:39
4. "O for a Thousand Tongues" - 4:12
5. "Morning Has Broken" - 3:38
6. "Be Still, My Soul" - 4:12
7. "A Mighty Fortress Is Our God" - 4:29
8. "Come, Thou Long-Expected Jesus" - 4:50
9. "O Sacred Head, Now Wounded" - 5:08
10. "All Creatures of Our God and King" - 2:58
11. "My Jesus I Love Thee" - 4:53
12. "Great Is Thy Faithfulness" - 4:05
13. "Joyful, Joyful, We Adore Thee" - 2:39
14. "Crown Him With Many Crowns" - 3:47
15. "Holy, Holy, Holy" - 5:32
16. "Fairest Lord Jesus" - 3:44
17. "Oh the Deep, Deep Love of Jesus" - 4:09
18. "He Has Formed Me" - 1:41
