= Won't Go Back =

Won't Go Back may refer to:

- "Won't Go Back", a song from So Familiar (2015)
- "Won't Go Back", a song from Lady in Gold (album) (2016)
