= Singer Sower =

Studio album by 2nd Chapter of Acts
- Released: 1983
- Studio: Easter Song Studio in Garden Valley, Texas
- Genre: Contemporary Christian music
- Length: 35:43
- Label: Sparrow
- Producer: Buck Herring

2nd Chapter of Acts chronology
Rejoice (1981)	Singer Sower (1983)	Together Live (1983)

Singer Sower is the studio album by 2nd Chapter of Acts, released in 1983. It was recorded at Easter Song Studio in Garden Valley, Texas. As with all 2nd Chapter of Acts recordings, it was engineered and produced by Buck Herring.

== Track listing ==
From Discogs and MusicStack.

No.	Title	Writer(s)	Length
1.	"Room Noise"	Annie Herring, Matthew Ward	4:05
2.	"Beware My Heart"	Annie Herring	4:30
3.	"Ocean Liner"	Annie Herring, Buck Herring	4:33
4.	"Takin' the Easy Way"	Annie Herring	4:02
5.	"No One Will Have a Secret"	Annie Herring	4:00
6.	"Spin Your Light"	Annie Herring	3:26
7.	"Open Up My Blind Eyes"	Annie Herring, Buck Herring	4:22
8.	"I'm Wastin' No More Time"	Annie Herring	3:42
9.	"Lift Me Up"	Keith Green (music), Annie Herring, Buck Herring, Jimmy and Carol Owens	3:33
Total length:			35:43

== Personnel ==
2nd Chapter of Acts

- Annie Herring – vocals, acoustic piano, vocal arrangements
- Nelly Greisen – vocals, vocal arrangements
- Matthew Ward – vocals, guitar (1), vocal arrangements

Musicians

- Kerry Livgren – synthesizers, guitars
- Michael Omartian – pianos, synthesizers, synth solos, arrangements (1, 7, 5)
- Si Simonson – pianos
- Dean Harrington – guitars
- John Scudder – bass
- Leland Sklar – bass
- Jack Kelly – drums, Simmons drums

Kerry Livgren was not part of the band but appeared as a courtesy from CBS Records.

=== Production ===
- Buck Herring – producer, engineer
- John Guess – engineer
- Frank Wolf – engineer
- Eddie Yip – artwork
