= Darrell Mansfield =

American gospel and blues musician

- Origin: California, U.S.
- Genres: Gospel, contemporary Christian music, blues, blues rock, rock, country rock, soul/R&B
- Occupation(s): Vocalist, harmonica player, songwriter, recording artist, performer
- Instrument(s): Vocals, harmonica
- Years active: 1974–2018
- Labels: Maranatha!, A&S, Polydor, Ocean, Grrr, Spark, GMI Partners, Son
- Website: darrellmansfield.co

Darrell Mansfield is an American vocalist, harmonica player, songwriter, recording artist, and performer of various genres including gospel, contemporary Christian music, blues, blues rock, rock, country rock, and soul/R&B. He is considered a pioneer of the Jesus Music movement of the 1970s and has influenced countless contemporary Christian music and mainstream artists alike.

== Biography ==
In 1974, Mansfield formed the Christian country rock band, Jubal, along with Don Gerber, Paul Angers, Steve Kara, and Henry Cutrona. After a name change from Jubal to Gentle Faith, the group released their self-titled album, Gentle Faith, in 1976.

In 1977, Mansfield formed the Darrell Mansfield Band. He has since recorded over 30 albums and toured throughout the United States, Europe, the Middle East, Asia, and Australia.

Mansfield has contributed vocals and harmonica to recordings by artists including Adam Again, Eddie Van Halen, Jon Bon Jovi, Loverboy, and Raphael Saadiq. He has also played alongside Billy Idol, Billy Sheehan, Earl Slick, Glenn Kaiser, Jimmy Hall, Joe Turner, Richie Sambora, Rick Derringer, Ted Nugent, and The Blind Boys of Alabama.

Mansfield was inducted into the Hohner Harmonica Hall of Fame in 1980 and is the "Ambassador to California" for the Blues Hall of Fame.

Mansfield is a vocal advocate for those facing mental health issues. Having struggled with depression throughout his life as a result of a chemical imbalance, Mansfield attempted suicide on numerous occasions, first in 1971, and later in 2000, after which he spent two years at Atascadero State Hospital in central California. He now incorporates the discussion of mental health in his music ministry.

According to his website, since 2017 Mansfield is no longer performing due to his battle with dementia.

== Discography ==
- 1976: Gentle Faith (with Gentle Faith)
- 1979: Higher Power
- 1980: Get Ready
- 1983: Darrell Mansfield Live
- 1983: The Vision
- 1985: Revelation
- 1988: Darrell Mansfield Band Live at Calvary Chapel
- 1990: Trimmed and Burnin' ‒ with Glenn Kaiser
- 1991: Blues with a Feelin' ‒ with Eric Turner.
- 1991: Live at Flevo
- 1992: Get Ready (re-release)
- 1992: Give Him Your Blues
- 1993: Slow Burn ‒ with Glenn Kaiser
- 1993: Shack of Peasants
- 1994: The Blues Night ‒ with Glenn Kaiser
- 1994: Collection
- 1995: Mansfield and Company
- 1995: Tribute to Reverend Dan Smith: The Lord's House
- 1995: Into the Night ‒ with Larry Howard, Glenn Kaiser
- 1997: Delta Blues
- 1997: Crossroads
- 1998: Last Chance Boogie
- 1999: Live in Europe
- 2000: Live on Tour
- 2000: Soul'd Out
- 2004: The Best of Darrell Mansfield Vol. 1
- 2007: Shades
- 2008: Born to be Wild
- 2009: Life's Highway
- 2009: The Best of Darrell Mansfield Vol. 2
- 2009: People Get Ready (live)
- 2014: I Am Not Alone
- 2016: Lay My Burden Down - with Eric Turner

=== Guest appearances ===
- 1975: Karen Lafferty ‒ Bird in a Golden Sky (Maranatha! Music)

=== Compilation albums ===
- 1979: Hosanna USA Live (live) (Maranatha! Music)
- 1992: Larry Howard's Cornerstone Blues Jam (Live) (Forefront Records) Tracks 4 & 5

== Videography ==
- 1998: First Love: A Historic Gathering Of Jesus Music Pioneers (live)
- 2009: People Get Ready (live)
