= The Roar of Love =

Studio album by 2nd Chapter of Acts
- Released: 1980
- Recorded: 1976
- Studios: United Western, Hollywood, California; Sun West Studios, Hollywood, California; Frogshoes Studio, Burbank, California
- Genre: Contemporary Christian music
- Length: 35:17
- Label: Sparrow
- Producer: Buck Herring

2nd Chapter of Acts chronology
Mansion Builder (1978)	The Roar of Love (1980)	Encores (1981)

CD reissue cover

The Roar of Love is a 1980 concept album and fourth studio album by Christian band 2nd Chapter of Acts, that recounts the story of The Lion, the Witch and the Wardrobe, the first published book in The Chronicles of Narnia, a series by C. S. Lewis. It was recorded in 1976, prior to their third studio album Mansion Builder, but its release was delayed by contractual and copyright issues. According to band member Matthew Ward, all the vocals were cut in a bedroom of the house the trio lived in at the time. They converted their garage into a mixing room, knocked a hole in the bedroom wall and ran a microphone cord into it. The songs have a heavy use of synthesizers. It was reissued on the Live Oak label.

== Track listing ==
All songs were written by Annie Herring except "White Stag" (music by Matthew Ward and lyrics by Matthew Ward, Nellie Greisen and Annie Herring).

No.	Title	Length
1.	"Are You Goin' to Narnia? (Note: The first part of this track, approximately 45 seconds, is an unlisted instrumental intro. It is a separate track on the original LP.)"	3:26
2.	"Lucy's Long Gone"	1:46
3.	"Tell the Truth"	2:27
4.	"Turkish Delight"	3:00
5.	"Son of Adam, Daughter of Eve"	2:16
6.	"Christmas, Where Are You?"	1:50
7.	"Gifts from Father Christmas"	1:54
8.	"Aslan Is Killed"	2:28
9.	"The Roar of Love"	2:28
10.	"I've Heard the Stars Sing Before"	2:13
11.	"He's Broken Thru"	3:14
12.	"Witch's Demise / Get It Into Your Head"	2:40
13.	"Something Is Happening in Me"	2:03
14.	"White Stag (Note: The last part of this track, approximately 1:30, is an unlisted reprise, with vocals, of the instrumental intro to "Are You Goin' To Narnia?" It is a separate track on the original LP.)"	3:25
Total length:		35:17

Note: On the later CD and iTunes releases, tracks 6 and 7 are combined into one simply titled "Christmas, Where Are You?", for a total of 13 tracks.

== Personnel ==
- 2nd Chapter of Acts — vocals, vocal arrangements and crystal glasses
- Leland Sklar — bass
- David Kemper — drums
- Michael Omartian — keyboards, synthesizers and instrumental arrangements
- Phil Keaggy — guitar, guitar solos
- Jay Graydon — guitar
- Alex Cima — synthesizer programming
- Matthew Ward — whistle
- Joel Strasser — photography
- Larry McAdams — cover illustration and design
