= Jesus rock =

Jesus rock may refer to:

- Christian rock
- Contemporary Christian music
- Jesus music
