= Night Light (2nd Chapter of Acts album) =

Studio album by 2nd Chapter of Acts
- Released: 1985
- Genre: Contemporary Christian music
- Label: Live Oak
- Producer: Buck Herring

2nd Chapter of Acts chronology
Together Live (1983)	Night Light (1985)	Hymns (1986)

Night Light is the title of a 1985 studio album by 2nd Chapter of Acts.

== Track listing ==
From discogs.com and AllMusic.

All songs written by Annie Herring, except where noted.

1. "Night Light" – 3:29
2. "Heartstrings" – 3:37
3. "Oh No! Can't Believe It!" (Annie Herring, Buck Herring) – 4:25
4. "He Will Rule" – 4:28
5. "Consider the Lilies" – 3:14
6. "He's the Light" (Annie Herring, Matthew Ward) – 4:04
7. "Oh Boy!" – 3:16
8. "What to Do with My Heart" – 3:43
9. "That's Not Nice to Say" (Annie Herring, Buck Herring, Matthew Ward) – 5:07
10. "Jesus Will be Right Back" – 3:30

== Personnel ==
2nd Chapter of Acts

- Annie Herring – vocals, acoustic piano, vocal arrangements
- Nelly Ward – vocals, vocal arrangements
- Matthew Ward – vocals, vocal arrangements, arrangements (1–7, 9, 10)

Musicians

- Jim Tenneboe – synthesizers (1, 2, 4–7, 9), acoustic piano (4, 5)
- Kerry Livgren – synthesizers (3, 10), guitars (3, 10), arrangements
- Michael Omartian – acoustic piano (8), synthesizers (8), arrangements (8)
- Si Simonson – acoustic piano (10)
- Curt Bartlett – guitars (1, 2, 4–7, 9)
- John Scudder – bass (1, 2, 4–7, 9)
- Leland Sklar – bass (3, 10)
- Jack Kelly – drums (1, 2, 3, 5, 7–10)
- Michael Celenza – drums (4, 6), percussion (4, 6)
- Sherman Trivette – saxophone (2)
- Jimmy Owens – string arrangements (1, 5)

Kerry Livgren was not part of the band but appeared as a courtesy from CBS Records.

=== Production ===
- Buck Herring – producer, engineer, mixing
- Wally Dugid – engineer
- Greg Hunt – mixing
- Constance Ashley – photography
