= In the Volume of the Book =

Studio album by 2nd Chapter of Acts
- Released: 1975
- Studio: Sun West Studios in Hollywood, California
- Genre: Jesus music
- Length: 33:51
- Label: Myrrh
- Producer: Buck Herring

2nd Chapter of Acts chronology
With Footnotes (1974)	In the Volume of the Book (1975)	To the Bride (1975)

In the Volume of the Book, released in 1975, was the second studio album from the contemporary Christian music group, 2nd Chapter of Acts. The album title is a reference to Psalm 40:7 ("...in the volume of the book it is written of me").

== Track listing ==
No.	Title	Writer(s)	Length
1.	"Start Every Day with a Smile"	Annie Herring	0:54
2.	"Yahweh"	Jesse Cosio	3:07
3.	"Something Tells Me"	Annie Herring	3:29
4.	"The Grey Song"	Annie Herring	1:56
5.	"Now That I Belong to You"	Annie Herring	4:04
6.	"Ps. 63"	Matthew Ward, Richard Souther	1:51
7.	"Prince Song"	Annie Herring	2:51
8.	"Morning Comes When You Call"	Annie Herring, Matthew Ward	3:10
9.	"Borrowed Time"	Annie Herring	2:30
10.	"Last Day of My Life"	Annie Herring	3:08
11.	"Hey, Whatcha' Say"	Annie Herring, Nelly Ward, Matthew Ward	3:20
12.	"Keep on Shinin'"	Annie Herring	3:13
13.	"I Can't Get Near You"	Annie Herring	2:18
Total length:			33:51

== Personnel ==
- Michael Been – bass guitar
- Jim Gordon – percussion
- Emery Gordy – bass guitar
- Jay Graydon – guitar
- John Guerin – percussion
- Annie Herring – piano, percussion
- David Hungate – bass guitar
- Phil Keaggy – guitar, guitar solos
- David Kemper – drums
- Michael Omartian – piano, percussion, organ, AARPVARK
- Larry Rolando – guitar
- Danny Timms – piano
