= Very Best of 2nd Chapter of Acts =

Compilation album by 2nd Chapter of Acts
- Released: 2006
- Genre: Contemporary Christian music
- Length: 41:40
- Label: Sparrow
- Producer: Buck Herring

2nd Chapter of Acts chronology
20 (1992)	Very Best of 2nd Chapter of Acts (2006)

Very Best of 2nd Chapter of Acts is a 2006 compilation album by Contemporary Christian music group 2nd Chapter of Acts released under the Sparrow label.

== Track listing ==
1. "Last Day of My Life" - 3:09
2. "Yahweh" - 3:22
3. "Prince Song" - 2:51
4. "Which Way the Wind Blows" - 4:41
5. "Easter Song" - 2:38
6. "Humble Yourself" - 3:58
7. "Mansion Builder" - 3:10
8. "Rod and Staff" - 2:58
9. "Takin' the Easy Way" - 4:02
10. "Night Light" - 3:30
11. "Are You Goin' to Narnia" - 3:26
12. "Well, Haven't You Heard" - 3:55
