= Bethlehem (Christian band) =

American Christian country rock band

Bethlehem was an American Christian country rock band in the 1970s, during the Jesus Music era, before the rise of the contemporary Christian music industry. The group released one self-titled album in 1978 under the Maranatha! label. The group's sound has drawn comparison with general market bands such as Poco and Eagles.

The band members were:

Danny Daniels
acoustic and electric guitars, lead and backing vocals
Dom Franco
Pedal Steel guitar, dobro, vocals
Randy Rigby
lead electric guitar, keyboards, vocals
John Falcone
bass guitar, vocals
Dan McCleery
drums, percussion, vocals

They were connected with the Jesus movement revival, particularly that in southern California centered on Calvary Chapel Costa Mesa, California.

Bethlehem (Maranatha! Music #77-040 Lp & Cassette)

- Released: 1978
- Format: LP, Cassette, 8-Track
- Label: Maranatha! Music
- Tracks: "Think it Over", "Lover", "Desert Song", "Holy Ghost Blues", "Dead Reckoning", "Night Rider", "This Road", "No Good Excuses", "Just a Prayer Away", "Pilgrims"

The album was recorded during March and April 1978 at North Star Studios, Boulder, Colorado; Buddy King Studio, Huntington Beach, California; Sound Castle Studio, Hollywood, California; and Maranatha! Studio, Santa Ana, California. The album was engineered by Peter Gregg, Jonathan Brown and Al Perkins; mixed by Jonathan Brown and Al Perkins; mastered by Bob Carbone for A&M Records.
