= With Footnotes =

Studio album by 2nd Chapter of Acts
- Released: May 1974
- Studio: Sun West Studios in Hollywood, California
- Genre: Jesus music
- Length: 37:10
- Label: Myrrh
- Producer: Buck Herring

2nd Chapter of Acts chronology
With Footnotes (1974)	In the Volume of the Book (1975)

Singles from With Footnotes
- 1. "Easter Song" Released: 1974

With Footnotes is the debut album by the Christian group 2nd Chapter of Acts, released in 1974. It contains one of the group's most well-known songs, "Easter Song", which was named by CCM Magazine in 1998 as the No. 4 Christian song of all time.

== Track listing ==
No.	Title	Writer(s)	Length
1.	"Which Way the Wind Blows"	Annie Herring, Nelly Ward	4:58
2.	"Goin' Home"	Annie Herring	2:48
3.	"With Jesus"	Annie Herring, Buck Herring	2:45
4.	"The Devil's Lost Again"	Buck Herring, Edward Overstreet	3:06
5.	"Love, Peace, Joy"	Annie Herring	2:33
6.	"I Don't Wanna Go Home"	Annie Herring, Buck Herring	2:28
7.	"Easter Song"	Annie Herring	2:20
8.	"He Loves Me"	Annie Herring	5:07
9.	"Good News"	Annie Herring	3:20
10.	"I Fall in Love / Change"	Annie Herring	4:22
11.	"The Son Comes Over the Hill"	Annie Herring	3:23
Total length:			37:10

== Personnel ==
- 2nd Chapter of Acts – vocals
- Mike Been – bass
- Mike Deasy – guitar
- Jim Gordon – drums
- John Guerin – drums
- Annie Herring – piano
- Tom Keene – piano, string/horn arrangements on "I Don't Wanna Go Home"
- David Kemper – drums
- Al McKay – guitar
- Art Munson – guitar
- Michael Omartian – ARP synthesizer, piano, organ, drums, string/horn arrangements except "I Don't Wanna Go Home"
- Joe Osborn – bass
- Danny Timms – piano, organ
- Wally Duguid – photography
