= 20 (2nd Chapter of Acts album) =

Compilation album by 2nd Chapter of Acts
- Released: 1992
- Genre: Contemporary Christian music
- Length: 142:51
- Label: Sparrow
- Producer: Buck Herring

2nd Chapter of Acts chronology
Hymns Instrumental (1989)	20 (1992)	Very Best of 2nd Chapter of Acts (2006)

20 is the 1992 retrospective two-CD box set by contemporary Christian music group 2nd Chapter of Acts. It consists of their catalog of music, plus live performances and early recordings.

== Track listing ==
Disc 1

1. "Jesus Is" – 2:24
2. "Looking at God's Son" – 2:38
3. "I'm So Happy" – 2:41
4. "Which Way the Wind Blows" – 4:58
5. "Easter Song" – 2:20
6. "Last Day of My Life" – 3:08
7. "Prince Song" – 2:51
8. "Hey, Whatcha Say" – 3:28
9. "Medley: Morning Comes When You Call\The Son Comes Over the Hill" – 5:31
10. "Keep on Shining" – 3:27
11. "Something Tells Me" – 3:39
12. "Rod and Staff" – 2:55
13. "Mansion Builder" – 3:02
14. "Starlight, Starbright" – 3:00
15. "Lightning Flash" – 2:45
16. "Well, Haven't You Heard?" – 3:50
17. "Are You Going to Narnia" – 3:26
18. "Son of Adam Daughter of Eve" – 2:16
19. "He's Broken Thru" – 2:41
20. "Rejoice" – 3:00
21. "Bread of Life" – 2:04
22. "Nobody Can Take My Life" – 3:28
23. "Heaven Came to Earth" – 2:15
24. "Mountain Tops" – 2:54

Disc 2

1. "I Fall In Love\Change" – 4:22
2. "Room Noise" – 4:05
3. "Takin' the Easy Way" – 4:02
4. "Beware My Heart" – 4:30
5. "Spin Your Light" – 3:26
6. "No One Will Have A Secret" – 4:00
7. "Night Light" – 3:29
8. "That's Not Nice To Say" – 5:07
9. "Heartstrings" – 3:37
10. "He's the Light" – 4:04
11. "Humble Yourself" – 3:57
12. "Sing Over Me" – 4:05
13. "Maybe Some Other Day" – 3:45
14. "Take It to the World" – 3:03
15. "You Are All In All" – 4:59
16. "Just One Word" – 3:32
17. "Star" – 4:07
