= Love Song (band) =

American Jesus music band

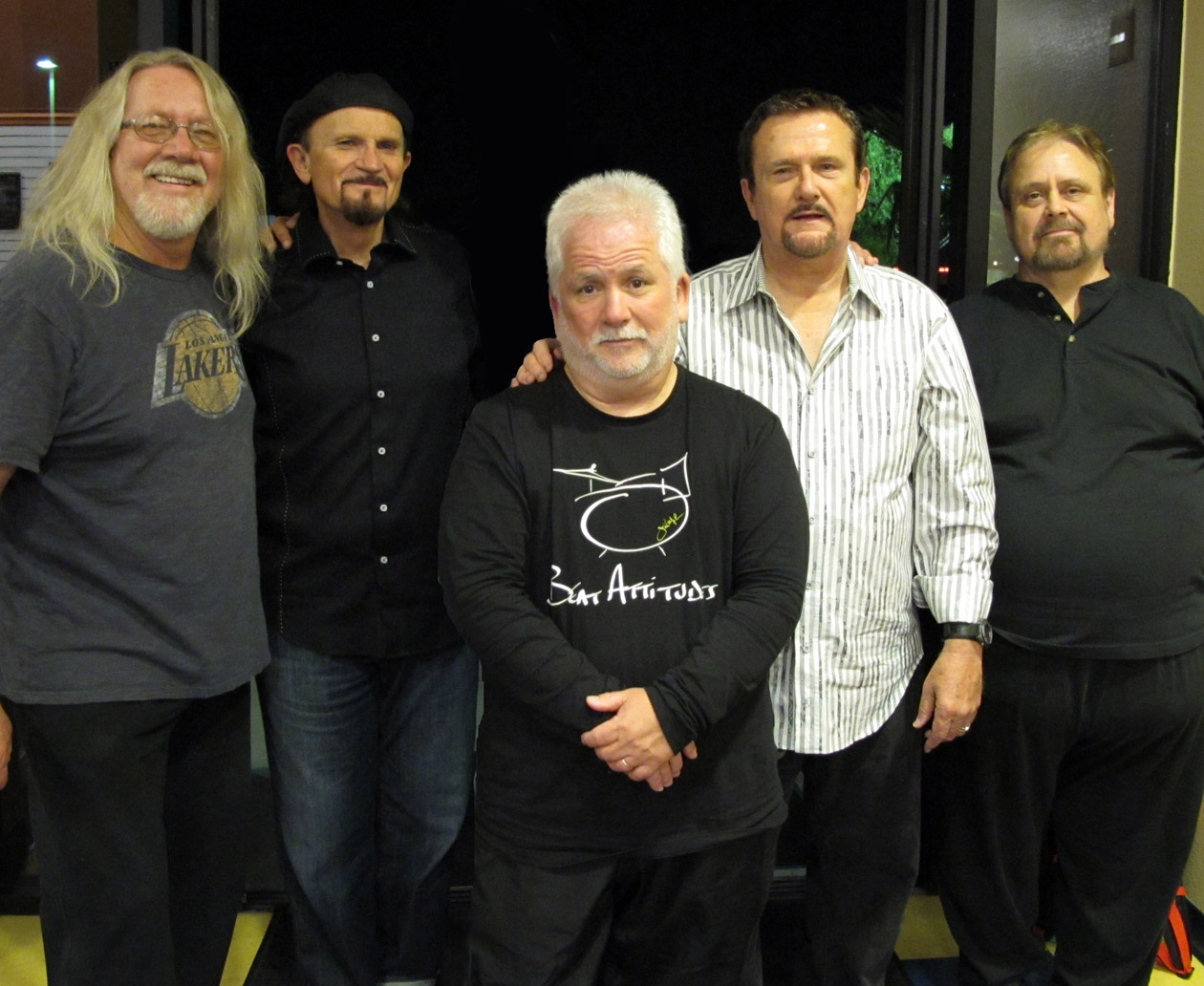
- Love Song in 2010. (L–R) Truax, Coomes, Mehler, Girard, Wall

Background information
- Origin: Costa Mesa, California U.S.
- Genres: Jesus music, country rock, soft rock
- Years active: 1970-present
- Label: Good News
- Website: lovesongtheband.com

Love Song was one of the most prominent Jesus music bands, and one of the first Christian rock bands. They released two studio albums—Love Song (1972) and Final Touch (1974)—and one live album—Feel the Love (1977)—before disbanding. They subsequently released Welcome Back in 1994, remastered versions of the three early albums and Love Song: The Book of Love as a box set in 2010.

== Background ==
Love Song was founded in 1970 by Chuck Girard, Tommy Coomes, Jay Truax, and Fred Field, prior to the conversion of any of the band members. Field and Truax were the first two to convert to Christianity and began attending a bible study at Chuck Smith's Calvary Chapel where the other two eventually "accepted Jesus". Drummer John Mehler joined within six months, but he and Field left before mid-1971 to form a new group. Bob Wall, who subsequently played guitar on all three albums, was brought in. It was this group of four who recorded their 1972 debut album: Love Song. It is on CCM Magazine's listing of 25 greatest Christian Contemporary music albums of all time. In 2002's Encyclopedia of Contemporary Christian Music, Mark Allan Powell states that this album was the best selling Christian album to date, and despite not having high production standards, it was influential as it had no equivalent peer to rely on. He also claims that it had both artistic integrity and an inspired vision, and in this way they connected with their target audience. He compared what they achieved with this first album to what the Grateful Dead did in concert. Love Song, according to Powell, left people talking about Jesus, which was the band's goal. Mehler, eventually rejoined in time to play on Final Touch. Phil Keaggy joined to replace departing Wall in 1973 for a short stint, but was not included in any of the band's early recordings.

The group toured heavily in the early 1970s, becoming very popular both in the US and abroad. They released Final Touch in 1974. By 1976, Jesus music had been renamed contemporary Christian music (CCM), and it was becoming more business than ministry. Many of the bands that had started the movement began to break up. There was a final "Reunion Tour" in 1976 which resulted in the Feel the Love double live album in 1977. Subsequently, many of the original members continued with solo careers. In 1994, the band recorded another reunion album, Welcome Back which primarily consists of new renditions of songs off the first albums but included guitar work from Keaggy and bass from John Patitucci.

In 2001, they released a box-set containing their first three albums plus a DVD of a 1973 concert in San Antonio. All original tapes on all three projects (Love Song, Final Touch, and the live Feel the Love albums) were re-mastered at Mastering Lab. Recording engineer Bill Schnee assisted Girard and Coomes in the work. Mehler's seven-minute drum solo, omitted from the original CD release of the live album, was added back in the re-mastered version. Love Song started a reunion tour in 2010 with Calvary Chapel founding Pastor Chuck Smith touring throughout the U.S.

In 2017 the band played a two-night appearance concert at The Upper Room in Orange County, California. Those concerts were filmed with the intention of producing a live concert DVD. Through a series of circumstances that project turned into the production of a 3-part docuseries on this iconic band, which has been released on Amazon Prime. Many notable people contributed to this project. The title of the docuseries is A Band Called Love Song.

== Discography ==
- Love Song (1972) remastered in 2010
- Final Touch (1974) remastered in 2010
- Feel the Love (1977) - double live album remastered in 2010 with "Drum Solo" included; original CD release had excluded it
- Welcome Back (1994)
- Love Song: The Book of Love Box Set (2010) contains three original albums plus a DVD of early 1973 concert and a CD of demo sessions The Early Years.

=== Compilation appearances ===
- "Love Song" – First Love (1998)
- "Little Country Church" – The Everlastin' Living Jesus Music Concert (1971)
- "Jesus Puts the Song in Our Hearts" – Great Gospel Songs Encore! (1974)
- "Think About What Jesus Said" – Love Peace Joy (1974)
- "Think About What Jesus Said" – Jubilation! (1975)
- "Little Country Church" – The Latest Word (1978)
- "Little Country Church" – The Best of Maranatha! (1979)
- "Little Country Church", "Since I Opened Up the Door" and "Two Hands" – The Rock Revival (1994)
- "Little Country Church" – Maranatha! Collection - Volume 1 (1999)
- "Little Country Church" – The Best of Christian Rock Volume 1 1970-1986 (2003)
- "A Love Song" – Jesus Music Anthology: The '70s (2012)
- "Little Country Church" – The Maranatha Series (2012)

== Videography ==
- Live In San Antonio '73-DVD (2010) Includes Live performance, photos and footage of a baptism led by Pastor Chuck Smith
