= Dennis Jernigan =

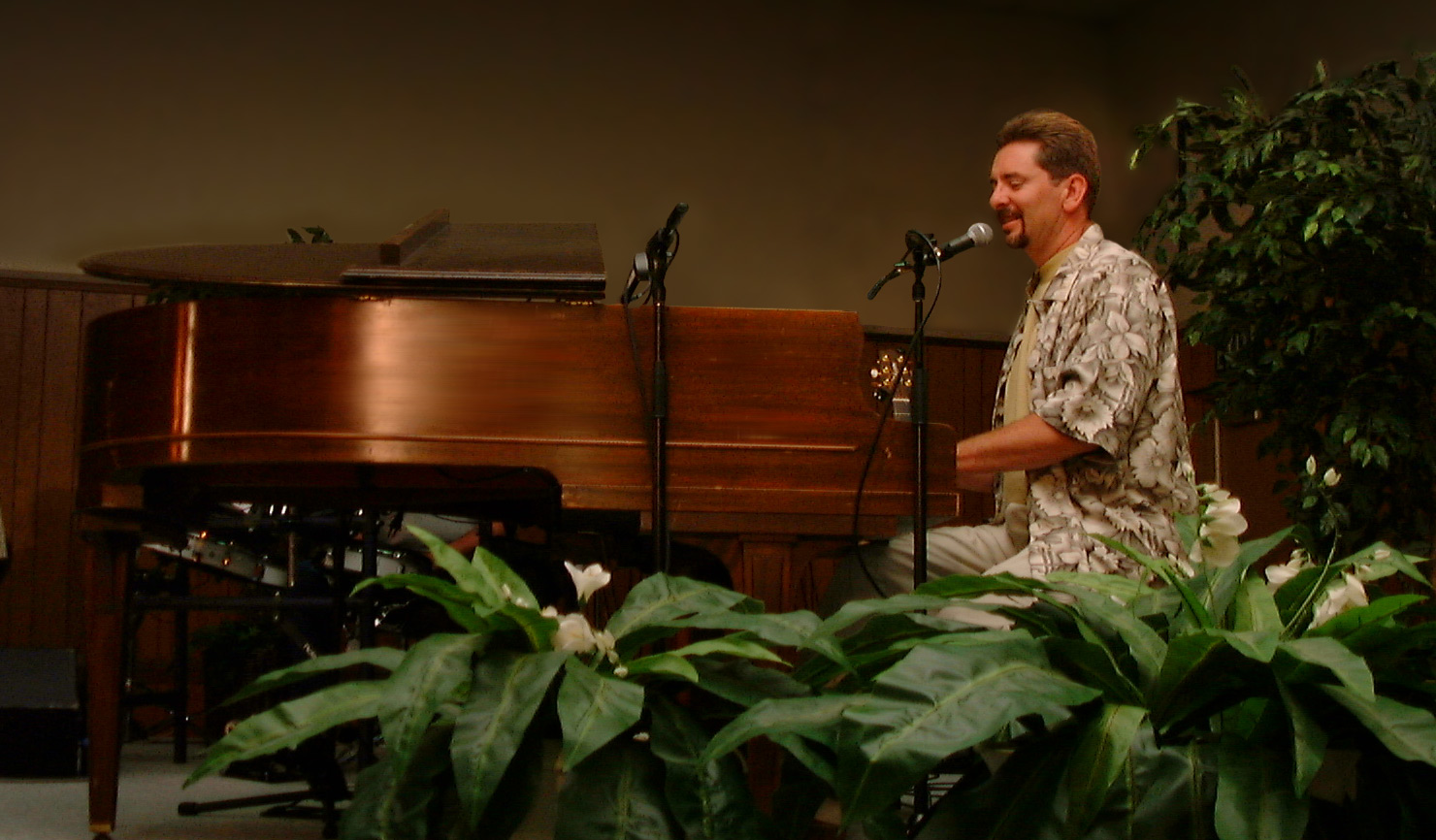
- Dennis Jernigan in June 2001

Background information
- Born: February 9, 1959 (age 67); Oklahoma City, Oklahoma, US
- Origin: Boynton, Oklahoma, US
- Genres: Contemporary Christian music
- Occupation: Singer-songwriter
- Instrument: Piano
- Years active: 1989–present
- Website: dennisjernigan.com

Dennis Jernigan is a singer-songwriter of contemporary Christian music. He is native to Oklahoma, and headquarters a music-based Christian ministry from there. Jernigan now lives in Muskogee, Oklahoma, with his wife and their nine children.

Jernigan is a graduate of Oklahoma Baptist University.

== Awards ==
Jernigan was inducted into the Oklahoma Music Hall of Fame in 2018.

== Personal life ==
A primary source of inspiration for Jernigan's message and music is an experience he describes as his deliverance from homosexuality. Jernigan states that this began during a 2nd Chapter of Acts concert in Norman, Oklahoma. Jernigan believes his prior identification as homosexual was related to an erroneous childhood perception that he had been rejected by his father.

Following the experience at the concert, Jernigan developed a ministry based on his personal experience, which he shares at churches and other locations around the world. In a concert at Wynne Baptist Church, Jernigan stated that he does not wish to be labeled as "ex-gay", but instead as "reborn" or as "[God's] new creation."

== Documentary film ==
Jernigan is the subject of the 2014 film Sing Over Me, a documentary covering his career and struggle with homosexuality. The film was written and directed by Jacob Kindberg.

== Creative collaborations ==
Jernigan has recorded with Natalie Grant, Twila Paris, Ron Kenoly and Rebecca St. James.

== Discography ==
- Like Christmas All Year 'Round (1994)
- Celebrate Living (1995)
- A Mystery of Majesty (1997)
- The Dennis Jernigan Collection (1998)
- This Is My Destiny (1999)
- Help Me To Remember (2000)
- Worshipper's Collection, Vol. 1 (2000)
- Worshipper's Collection, Vol. 2 (2000)
- Worshipper's Collection, Vol. 3 (2000)
- Worshipper's Collection, Vol. 4 (2000)
- Songs of Ministry (2000)
- We Will Worship (Worship Musical) (2000)
- David (2001)
- I Surrender (2001)
- Giant Killer: A Heart Like David (2002)
- Jernigan Family Christmas (2003)
- Hands Lifted High (2004)
- I Salute You (2005)
- Songs of Freedom for Men (2005)
- Songs of Freedom for Women (2005)
- Daddy's Song (2005)
- I Will Be There (2006)
- I Cry Holy (2007)
- Carols Made New (2007)
- Kingdom Come (2008)
- Here In Your Presence - Live from San Antonio (2010)
- Forty Days & Forty Nights Volume 1 (2010)
- Forty Days & Forty Nights Volume 2 (2010)
- Hymns 1 (2011)
- Days of Awe (2013)
- Christmas Piano Volume 2 (2015)
- First Love (2016)
- Fun Songs & Lullabies (2018)
- Victim to Victor (2019)
- The Very First Christmas Tree (2019)
- The Middle of Nowhere (2020)
- Might As Well Be Happy (2023)
- Peace Piano & Sounds Of Nature (2024)
- Sanctuary (2024)
- Mosaic of Your Love (2025)
- Forty Days & Forty Nights Volume 3 (2025)
- Forty Days & Forty Nights Volume 4 (2025)

== See also ==
- You Are My All in All, Jernigan's most notable song
- Ex-gay movement
