= Holy, Holy, Holy! Lord God Almighty =

Christian hymn written by Reginald Heber

"Holy, Holy, Holy! Lord God Almighty!"
- Hymn
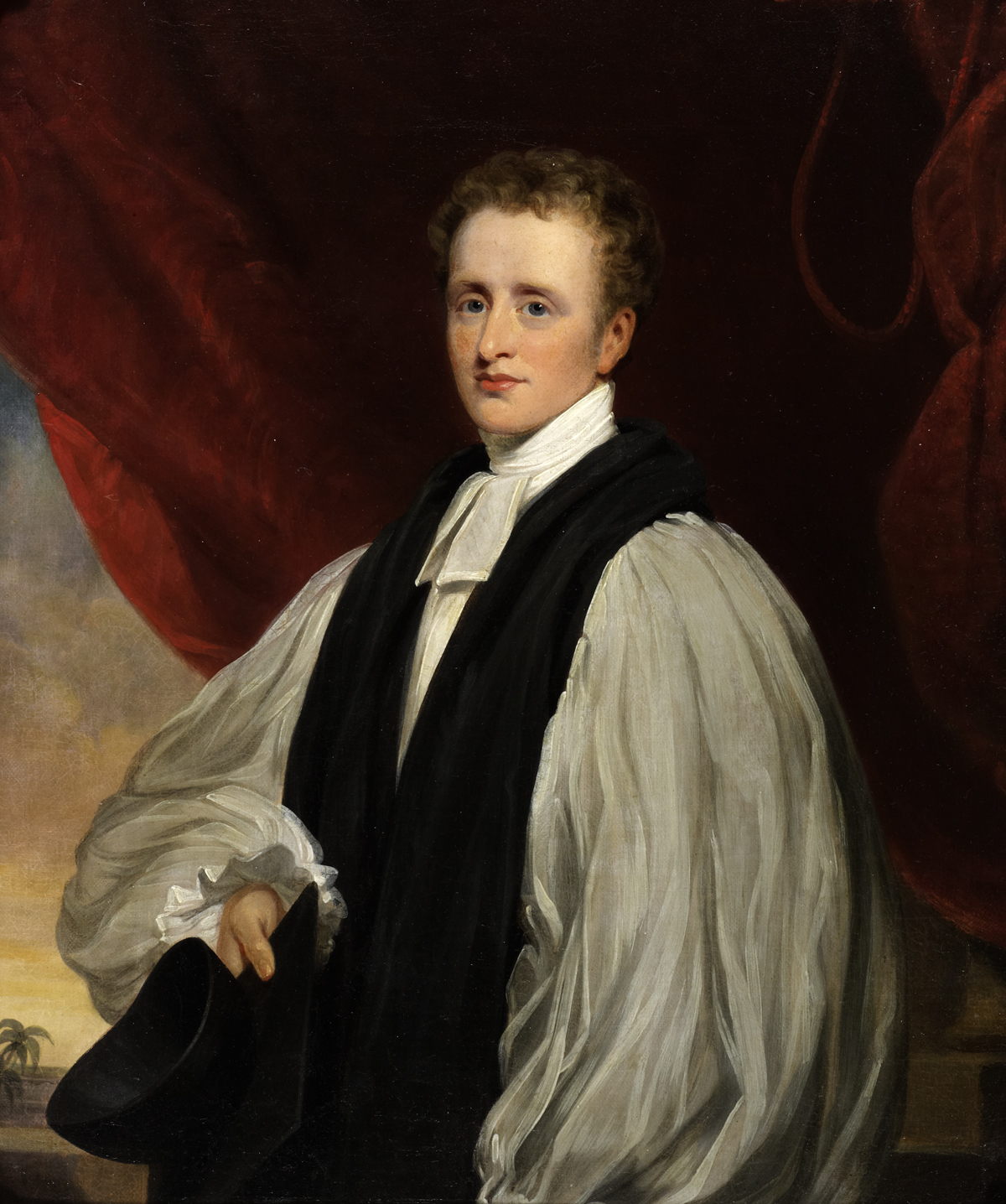
- Reginald Heber
- Occasion: Trinity
- Text: by Reginald Heber
- Based on: Sanctus; Revelation 4:1–11
- Meter: 11.12.12.10
- Melody: "Nicaea" by John Bacchus Dykes
- Composed: 1861

"Holy, Holy, Holy! Lord God Almighty!" is a Christian hymn written by the Anglican bishop Reginald Heber (1783–1826).

Written during the author's time as vicar in Hodnet, Shropshire, England, the text was first published posthumously in 1826. It was set to the tune "Nicaea," by John Bacchus Dykes, in the influential Hymns Ancient and Modern. It remains one of Heber's most popular compositions, enduring into the 21st century in many Christian traditions.

Intended for use on Trinity Sunday, the text invites worshippers to join in praising the trinitarian Deity, paraphrasing Revelation 4:1–11.

== History ==
The hymn was written in the early 1800s during Heber's time as vicar (1807–1823) in Hodnet, Shropshire, England, a period in which the author was prolific, writing more than 100 hymns, many having survived to modern times. It was first published posthumously in A Selection of Psalms and Hymns for the Parish Church of Banbury (Third Edition, 1826), and thereafter by the writer's widow in Hymns Written and Adapted to the Weekly Church Service of the Year (1827), one of the first hymnals to group their hymns by the liturgical occasion within the church year.

It was published when Anglican authorities disapproved of the singing of hymns in churches, other than metrical psalms, although there was considerable informal hymn-singing in parishes. Heber originally intended to win support for their inclusion. It is popular in the Anglican tradition, having appeared in the influential Hymns Ancient and Modern (1861) as well as The English Hymnal (1906) and The New English Hymnal (1986). It is considered the author's best known and most widely used hymn, and remains popular in many denominations. It has been described as one of the rare hymns which appears "in just about every hymnal". It has been performed and recorded in various styles, by artists such as Steven Curtis Chapman, Sufjan Stevens, Hillsong United, the Choir of King's College, Cambridge, the 2nd Chapter of Acts and the Mormon Tabernacle Choir.

== Text ==
The text speaks specifically of the Holy Trinity, having been written for use on Trinity Sunday, although it can also be used as a general hymn of praise throughout the liturgical year. The opening line (Holy, Holy, Holy! Lord God Almighty!) references Isaiah 6:3 and Revelation 4:8 and mirrors the opening line of the Sanctus (Holy, Holy, Holy, Lord God of hosts). Described as a "reverent and faithful paraphrase of Revelation 4:8–11" and of the Johannine vision of unending worship in Heaven, it is an example of Heber's dutiful attempt to avoid excessive emotionalism. A defining characteristic is that the text does not "initiate praise", but is rather an invitation to join in an endless song. Poetically, it is in the long and unusual 11.12.12.10 meter, contrasting with the shorter stanzas of most preceding English hymnody, such as that of Isaac Watts or Charles Wesley. Additionally, every single line rhymes with the initial "holy".

The text has a wide scope, successively referencing humans, saints, angels and all living creatures, and its main theme is the "basic belief in the Trinity", which is shared by most denominations of the Christian church despite other differences. The first stanza opens with an invitation to worship God in the morning; although variants have been sometimes used to adapt the hymn for any time of day. The second stanza magnifies the opening idea, with saints joining "in adoring the Majesty in heaven". The third stanza describes some attributes of the Christian deity, while the final stanza is a climax of the preceding with "earth and sky and sea" joining in praising the divine. Variants to the original text in modern hymnals are relatively minor, mostly found in usage by non-trinitarian groups such as the Mormons – where the final line is changed to "God in His glory, blessed Deity!" – or as a push for more gender inclusive language.

Holy, Holy, Holy! Lord God Almighty!
Early in the morning our song shall rise to Thee;
Holy, Holy, Holy! Merciful and Mighty!
God in Three Persons, blessed Trinity!

Holy, Holy, Holy! All the saints adore Thee,
Casting down their golden crowns around the glassy sea;
Cherubim and seraphim falling down before Thee,
Which wert, and art, and evermore shalt be.

Holy, Holy, Holy! though the darkness hide Thee,
Though the eye of sinful man, thy glory may not see:
Only Thou art holy, there is none beside Thee,
Perfect in power in love, and purity.

Holy, holy, holy! Lord God Almighty!
All thy works shall praise thy name in earth, and sky, and sea;
Holy, Holy, Holy! merciful and mighty,
God in Three Persons, blessed Trinity!

Some Unitarian hymnals also employed, deliberately, the same tune for "Bring, O morn, thy music" by William Channing Gannett, which has been described as a "considered response" to the Trinitarianism of the original text. It includes deliberate quotations of Heber's text, notably the repeated final line "Who wert, and art, and evermore shalt be". This text remained popular in such denominations until recently.

== Tune ==
The tune for this hymn, Nicaea, was composed by John Bacchus Dykes for the first edition of Hymns Ancient and Modern in 1861. The tune name is a tribute to the First Council of Nicaea – held by the Roman Emperor Constantine I in 325 – which formalized the doctrine of the Trinity. Rarely separated from the lyrics since then, it has been noted as one of the composer's finest and shares resemblances with a 16th-century Lutheran chorale, "Wachet auf, ruft uns die Stimme" by Philipp Nicolai.

It is a good example of Victorian hymn tune writing, with "solid harmonies and subtle chromaticism." It begins with an ascending major triad, which can be seen as symbolizing the Trinity. Few leaps and many repeated consecutive notes lend it a chant-like character. The four-part harmonisation written by Dykes is usually unchanged in hymnals, though it is frequently transposed down a tone from the initial E major. The following setting is as it appears in The New English Hymnal:
