= Easter Song =

Song by 2nd Chapter of Acts

from the album With Footnotes
- Language: English
- Released: 1974
- Recorded: 1974
- Studio: Sun West Studios in Hollywood, California
- Genre: Jesus music
- Length: 2:20
- Label: Myrrh
- Songwriter: Annie Herring
- Producer: Buck Herring

"Easter Song" is a song written by Annie Herring of the Jesus music group the 2nd Chapter of Acts that tells of Jesus Christ's resurrection and the elation Christians feel about this resurrection on Easter. It was first recorded in 1974 and released on the band's debut album, With Footnotes. It continues to be performed, appearing in church hymnals and Easter songbooks as well as on Wow Gold CD. It has been covered by several other artists, including GLAD and Keith Green.

According to Tori Taff of CCM Magazine, "The opening notes to 'Easter Song' just may be the single most recognizable intro in contemporary Christian music". The song even achieved moderate success as a crossover on mainstream radio stations. In 1998 CCM Magazine named "Easter Song" as the No. 4 Christian song of all time.

== Background ==
Annie Herring began writing songs soon after her marriage in 1969, at first sharing them only with her husband and siblings, then with others who wanted to hear them.

When she wrote "Easter Song", Herring believed that the song should be sung by a choir, not by herself and her two siblings, who comprised 2nd Chapter of Acts. One day Herring sang it for a friend, Jimmy Owens, thinking he might be able to use it in one of the musicals he was writing. Owens knew that the song was for 2nd Chapter of Acts to sing, and convinced Herring that the group should record it.

2nd Chapter of Acts' band did not share Jimmy's vision, and the drummer complained that he did not hear any drums in that song at all. Buck Herring, Herring's husband, would not take "no drums" for an answer, and told the drummer firmly to just play something, anything. The drummer put a different beat to the song, taking it once and for all out of the realm of a choral piece, and into the lilting rhythm. Then another friend, Michael Omartian, added the energetic keyboards that has given the intro the title of "the single most recognizable intro in contemporary Christian music".

== Cover versions ==
- GLAD: The Acapella Project (1988)
- Keith Green: For Him Who Has Ears to Hear (1978), The Ministry Years Volume One (1987), The Live Experience (2008), The Greatest Hits (2008)
- Hella Heizmann: Ich Bin Dir Nah (2010)
- VeggieTales: A Very Veggie Easter (2006)
