= Nancy Honeytree =

American Christian musician

- Born: Nancy Henigbaum
- Origin: Davenport, Iowa, U.S.
- Genres: Jesus music; folk rock; blues; classical
- Occupation: singer
- Instrument: Guitar
- Years active: 1973–present
- Labels: OakTable Publishing, Myrrh/ Word Records, Benson Records, Sparrow Records, Milk & Honey Records
- Website: honeytree.org

Nancy Honeytree is an American Christian musician and one of the leaders in what was known as Jesus music.

== Background ==
Born Nancy Henigbaum ("Honeytree" being a translation of her family's German name) was born into a family of professional classical musicians. As a teen, Nancy Honeytree was drawn toward the hippie kids at her school, University of Iowa High School, eventually drifting into the drug culture. In 1970 she met some Jesus People at her sister's art school, and became one herself. After graduating, she worked at a youth ministry in Fort Wayne, Indiana, called "The Adam's Apple", a part of the Jesus movement, and it was during these years that she began to write songs about her new-found faith, recording her self-titled first album in 1973.

Billed simply as "Honeytree" most of her career, the singer's folk rock-soprano style was influenced by mainstream artists such as Joni Mitchell, Carole King and Judy Collins, but her lyrics were largely dealing with one's personal relationship with Jesus Christ.

She continued recording throughout the 1970s and toured as a solo artist and with some of the best-known names of the Jesus Movement, such as Phil Keaggy, Mike Johnson, and Mike Warnke. Her third album, Evergreen, is often considered among her best. As her career progressed, Honeytree's style shifted to a classical/bluegrass mix. On October 30, 1983, Honeytree was formally ordained by her church, Calvary Temple, in Fort Wayne. During the 1980s she developed a ministry to single adults, a focus she maintains to this day.

== Marriage ==
In June 1990, Honeytree married John Richard Miller, also an ordained minister. In 1995 the couple gave birth to their first child; however, the infant died less than three hours after birth. After the loss, a song, "Up to Something Good", became a song of her faith. Three months later, the Millers were able to adopt another child. John Richard Miller died May 15, 2018, of heart disease.

== Discography ==
- Honeytree: The First Album 1973, Myrrh Records
- The Way I Feel 1974, Myrrh Records
- Evergreen 1975, Myrrh Records
- Me & My Old Guitar (live) 1977, Myrrh Records
- Melodies In Me 1978, Myrrh Records
- Maranatha Marathon 1979, Myrrh Records
- Merry Christmas, Love Honeytree 1981, Sparrow Records
- Best of Growing Up 1981, Myrrh Records
- Single Heart 1985, Benson Music
- Every Single Day 1987, Milk & Honey Records
- Best of Honeytree Classics. 1989, Milk & Honey Records.
- Resurrection Sunday 1991, Milk & Honey Records
- Pioneer (20th Anniversary Recording) 1993, OakTable Publishing, Inc.
- Dios Ha Abierto la Puerta 1994, OakTable Publishing, Inc.
- Change You Made in Me. 2000, OakTable Publishing, Inc.
