= So Familiar =

Studio album by Steve Martin and Edie Brickell
- Released: October 30, 2015
- Recorded: January 23–June 7, 2015
- Genre: Bluegrass
- Length: 34:12
- Label: Rounder
- Producer: Peter Asher

Steve Martin and Edie Brickell chronology
Love Has Come for You (2013)	So Familiar (2015)

Professional ratings
Review scores
Source	Rating
AllMusic	4/5 stars

So Familiar is a studio album by bluegrass duo Steve Martin and Edie Brickell. It was released on October 30, 2015 by Rounder Records.

== Track listing ==
All tracks are written by Edie Brickell and Steve Martin except "Way Back in the Day" written by Edie Brickell.

No.	Title	Length
1.	"So Familiar"	2:46
2.	"Always Will"	2:27
3.	"Way Back in the Day"	3:18
4.	"Won't Go Back"	2:22
5.	"I'm by Your Side"	2:39
6.	"I Had a Vision"	3:55
7.	"I Have You"	2:19
8.	"Another Round"	2:24
9.	"Mine All Mine"	2:09
10.	"Heart of the Dreamer"	3:14
11.	"My Baby"	3:20
12.	"Heartbreaker"	3:19
Total length:		34:12

== Charts ==
Chart (2015)	Peak position
US Billboard 200	126
US Top Bluegrass Albums (Billboard)	1
US Folk Albums (Billboard)	3
