= 2nd Chapter of Acts =

American Christian musical group

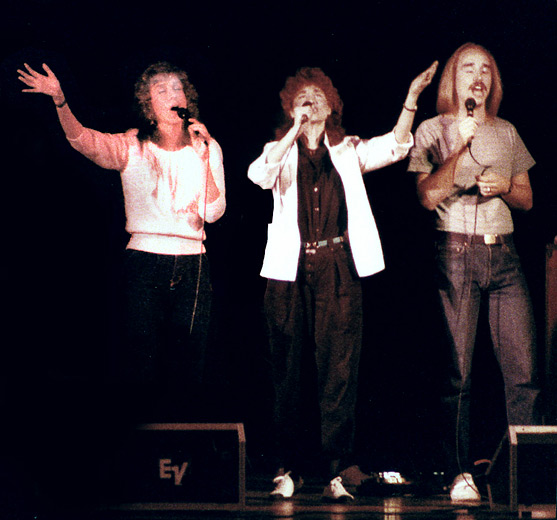
- 2nd Chapter of Acts, c. 1985

Background information
- Origin: California, U.S.
- Genres: Contemporary Christian, Jesus music
- Years active: 1972–1988
- Labels: Myrrh, Sparrow, Live Oak
- Past members: Annie Herring; Nelly Greisen; Matthew Ward
- Website: www.2ndchapterofacts.com

The 2nd Chapter of Acts was a Jesus music and early contemporary Christian music group composed of sisters Annie Herring and Nelly Greisen and brother Matthew Ward. They began performing in 1972 and enjoyed their period of greatest success during the 1970s. The group disbanded in 1988.

== History ==
The 2nd Chapter of Acts began as a result of the trio singing at home together as Annie played the piano. Following the death of their parents (Elizabeth in 1968 and Walter Ward in 1970), Nelly and Matthew, still minors, moved in with their older sister, Annie, and her husband, recording engineer and producer, Buck Herring. Annie was a self-taught singer and songwriter who composed and played her songs around the family piano. Her brother and sister would often join in as she played, and eventually they developed extremely tight and intricate harmonies.

They started singing for local coffee houses and small gatherings, then gained the notice of Pat Boone who arranged a contract to record and release two singles with MGM, "Jesus Is" (1972) and "I'm So Happy" (1973). The fledgling trio also came to the attention of 1960s folk singer Barry McGuire, who had recently become a Christian and was preparing to record his first Christian music album, produced by Buck Herring. The siblings provided background vocals for Seeds and McGuire's 1974 follow-up Lighten Up.

The trio released their debut album, With Footnotes, in 1974. This album featured "Easter Song" which would become a signature piece for the group and has been recorded by many other artists since. This was followed up with In the Volume of the Book in 1975, the year that also saw the release of a live album with Barry McGuire, To the Bride, which included "a band called David", who supported 2nd Chapter of Acts on tour. 2nd Chapter of Acts' first three releases were issued by Myrrh Records, and the group toured with McGuire intermittently for three years.

The group went on a touring hiatus in 1976. Annie released her first solo record on the Sparrow Records label founded that year by the executive who had signed them to the Myrrh label, Billy Ray Hearn. For the summer of 1977, they were joined on an 18-city tour by Phil Keaggy and the result was the live triple album, How the West Was One. Their contract with Myrrh fulfilled, they moved as a group to Sparrow.

Their Sparrow debut, Mansion Builder (1978) was followed up with The Roar of Love (1980) (a concept album inspired by C. S. Lewis' The Lion, the Witch, and the Wardrobe), Rejoice (1981), Singer Sower (1983), and Together Live (1983) (with Michael and Stormie Omartian). 2nd Chapter moved to their own Live Oak label with the release of Night Light in 1985, and their final recording of original material, Faraway Places in 1987.

Their voices can be heard among other Christian artists on two benefit singles in 1985. Do Something Now! credited to The Cause on Sparrow Records to aid famine relief in Africa and Fight the Fight, Rescue the Unborn which featured over 100 Christian artists, to benefit the Christian Pro-Life Movement, released on Live Oak.

2nd Chapter of Acts broadened their appeal with the release of Hymns and Hymns 2, reaching audiences with more traditional music. Hymns proved to be their best-selling release, receiving a Dove Award for "Best Praise and Worship Album of the Year" in 1987.

Except for two sabbatical years in 1976 and 1983, 2nd Chapter of Acts continued to tour until 1988. Their final concert was in Houston, Texas on August 12 of that year.

2nd Chapter was recognized by the Gospel Music Association in 1999 by their induction into its Gospel Music Hall of Fame.

Annie and Matthew also recorded several solo projects during the 2nd Chapter of Acts years. Both have continued to release new material and perform concerts as of 2011.

== Roles of group members ==
Annie was the main songwriter of the group and the only one who played an instrument (piano). Her admittedly unschooled compositional style, with its frequent irregular rhythms, sometimes added almost progressive rock-like elements to what was otherwise an easy listening or soft-rock sound. Matthew and Nelly initially made the occasional small contribution to the lyrics, and Matthew developed as a songwriter for the group as his solo career grew.

Annie and Matthew sang most of the solo parts. Nelly — whose voice could be hard to distinguish from Annie's — most commonly sang lead only on songs where each member took a verse. Other songs where she sang lead were "I Don't Wanna Go Home," "Make My Life a Prayer to You," "Mountain Tops," "My Jesus I Love Thee" and "Sing Over Me." Some of the group's albums, such as The Roar of Love and Night Light, do not have any lead vocals by her.

== Discography ==
=== Albums ===
- 1974: With Footnotes (Myrrh)
- 1975: In the Volume of the Book (Myrrh)
- 1975: To the Bride (two LPs; with Barry McGuire and "a band called David") (Myrrh). Most of this is by McGuire. The 2nd Chapter's section — one side plus two songs — consists mostly of songs they never released anywhere else.
- 1976: Firewind (a "dramatic musical" based on Acts chapters 1–4) featuring Barry McGuire, Anne Herring, Terry Talbot, John Talbot, Nelly Ward, Keith Green and Matthew Ward, with narration by David Young (Sparrow SPR 1004)
- 1977: How the West Was One (Three LPs; with Phil Keaggy and "a band called David") (Myrrh). Half of this was by 2nd Chapter, half by Phil Keaggy. It was later reissued on two CDs.
- 1978: Mansion Builder (Sparrow Records)
- 1980: The Roar of Love (Sparrow)
- 1981: Rejoice (Sparrow)
- 1983: Singer Sower (Sparrow)
- 1983: Together Live (Two LPs; with Michael and Stormie Omartian) (Sparrow). One side plus one song was by the Omartians; the rest was by 2nd Chapter. It includes one 2nd Chapter song that was never released anywhere else. This is the only 2nd Chapter album that has never been released on CD.
- 1985: Night Light (Live Oak Records)
- 1986: Hymns (Live Oak Records)
- 1987: Far Away Places (Live Oak Records)
- 1988: Hymns II (Live Oak Records)
- 1989: Hymns Instrumental (Live Oak Records)

=== Compilations ===
- 1981: Encores (Myrrh)
- 1992: 20 (Navarre) [includes early singles and 2 previously unreleased songs] Issued on two CDs or two cassettes.
- 2006: Very Best of 2nd Chapter of Acts

=== Video ===
- 1983: Together Live [with Michael and Stormie Omartian] (Sparrow)
- 1998: First Love Various Artists
