= Matthew Ward (singer) =

American Christian singer

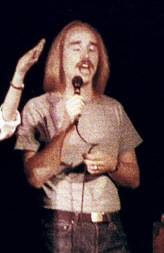
- Ward singing as part of 2nd Chapter of Acts, c. 1985

Background information
- Born: February 15, 1958 (age 68); Grand Forks, North Dakota, U.S.
- Genres: Contemporary Christian, Jesus music
- Occupations: Singer, songwriter
- Years active: 1972–present
- Formerly of: 2nd Chapter of Acts
- Website: matthewward.com

Matthew Ward (born February 15, 1958) is one of the pioneers of the Jesus music genre, later to be called contemporary Christian music. He is best known as a member of the trio 2nd Chapter of Acts, in which he sang and performed with his sisters Annie Herring and Nellie (Ward) Greisen. During his musical career with the 2nd Chapter of Acts from 1973 to 1988, he also recorded solo albums.

== Early history ==
Matthew's music and ministry was in no small part forged from personal family tragedy. In 1968 his mother, Elizabeth Ward, died of a brain tumor; two years later his father, Walter, died of leukemia leaving him and his sister, Nellie orphaned. The Ward siblings all decided that Matthew's older sister, Annie, and her new husband record producer Buck Herring should take in the two younger Ward siblings.

Matthew's older sister, Annie, was a self-styled (and self-taught) singer and songwriter who wrote and played her songs around the family piano. Matthew and sister, Nelly would often join in as Annie played and eventually they developed extremely tight and intricate harmonies.

As the trio gradually started singing for local coffee houses and small gatherings, they eventually gained the notice of Pat Boone who arranged a contract to record and release two singles with MGM, "Jesus Is" (1972), recorded on Matthew's 13th birthday, and "I'm So Happy" (1973). The fledgling trio also came to the attention of 1960s folk singer Barry McGuire, who had recently become a Christian and was preparing to record his first Christian music album, produced by Buck Herring. The siblings provided background vocals for Seeds and McGuire's 1974 follow-up Lighten Up.

Ward and his sister Nellie were enrolled in the Hollywood Professional School in 1972, and he attended that school for two years.

== Recent history ==
Following his career with the 2nd Chapter of Acts, Matthew Ward has recorded many more solo works and also works in the music industry as a background & jingle vocalist. He has worked with other such artists as Leslie Phillips, Donna Summer, LeAnn Rimes, Randy Stonehill, Sandi Patti, Dennis Jernigan, Jordin Sparks and many others.

The book, My 2nd Chapter: The Matthew Ward Story was released in February 2005. The autobiography includes how Ward battled his own bout with cancer—and won.

Matthew qualified as a Certified Nurse's Aide in 2013.

== Discography ==
=== 2nd Chapter of Acts ===
See 2nd Chapter of Acts Discography

=== Solo recordings ===
- 1979: Toward Eternity (Sparrow)
- 1986: Armed & Dangerous (Live Oak)
- 1988: Fade To White (Live Oak)
- 1990: Fortress (Live Oak)
- 1992: Matthew Ward Collection (a.k.a. The Best of Matthew Ward) (Benson)
- 1992: Point of View (Benson)
- 1997: My Redeemer (Newport)
- 2000: Even Now (Discovery House)
- 2006: Christmas with Matthew Ward (independent)
- 2011: Easter Song – A New Arrangement (single – independent)

=== Collaborations and guest appearances ===
- 1974: Come Together: A Musical Experience In Love various artists
- 1975: Growing Pains Jamie Owens (Light Records)
- 1976: Firewind: A Contemporary Dramatic Musical various artists
- 1976: Love Broke Thru Phil Keaggy (NewSong) (background vocals)
- 1978: First Class The Boones (Lamb & Lion) "I Love You More Than My Rock And Roll"
- 1980: So You Wanna Go Back to Egypt Keith Green (Sparrow) (background vocals)
- 1983: Ph'lip Side Phil Keaggy (Sparrow) (background vocals)
- 1983: She Works Hard for the Money Donna Summer (Mercury) "Love Has A Mind of Its Own"
- 1984: Dancing With Danger Leslie Phillips (Myrrh) "By My Spirit"
- 1986: Morning Like This Sandi Patti (Word) "Hosanna" (with sisters Annie Herring & Nelly Greisen, collectively as 2nd Chapter of Acts)
- 1986: Only the Overcomers Harvest (Benson) "Not By Sight"
- 1986: Greg X. Volz "The River is Rising", track: "Hold On to the Fire"
- 1987: Same Girl Twila Paris (Star Song) (background vocals)
- 1987: Voices various artists (Word) "Light of the World"
- 1987: Gorillas in the Mix Bernie Krause (Rykodisc) (keyboards, producer)
- 1989: Hosanna: 15 Songs Of Freedom The Maranatha Singers (Maranatha Music)
- 1989: It's the Thought Twila Paris (Star Song)
- 1989: Come and Worship (AM-001)Tape CD(AM-001CD) Various Artists (Alleluia! Music) Various Songs
- 1990: Handel's Young Messiah various artists (Word) "Comfort Ye"
- 1990: Your Love (AM-002)Tape CD(AM-002CD) Various Artists (Alleluia! Music) "Come into His Presence" & "When I See Your Smile"
- 1991: Flying Lessons Annie Herring (Sparrow) (background vocals)
- 1992: Master Pieces various artists (Benson) "The Warrior Is A Child"
- 1992: Generation 2 Generation various artists (Benson) "Who Do You Love The Best" with his daughter
- 1992: There's a Stirring Annie Herring (Sparrow)
- 1993: Completely Taken In Dallas Holm (Benson) (background vocals)
- 1994: God Is Able Ron Kenoly (Hosanna!)
- 1995: Sing Out with One Voice Ron Kenoly (Integrity)
- 1996: Celebrate Living Dennis Jernigan (Heartcry) "The Lord Is My Shepherd"
- 1996: Blue LeAnn Rimes (Curb) (background vocals)
- 1996: Glimpses Annie Herring (Chordant) (background vocals)
- 1998: First Love various artists (Exploration Films) "There is a Redeemer", "To The King" (and 2 with 2nd Chapter of Acts)
- 1998: Sittin' on Top of the World LeAnn Rimes (Curb) (background vocals)
- 1998: Wonder Annie Herring (Spring Hill) (background vocals)
- 1999: Choose This Day Promise Keepers (Maranatha) "To The King"
- 1999: LeAnn Rimes LeAnn Rimes (Curb) (background vocals)
- 1999: Praise 16: The Power of Your Love Maranatha Singers (Maranatha Music) "The Power of Your Love"
- 2000: Blue Moon Steve Holy (Curb) (background vocals)
- 2002: Celtic Cry: The Heart Of A Martyr various artists (Acts 26) "Hearts United"
- 2003: For Now Jordin Sparks
- 2004: Hands Lifted High Dennis Jernigan (Doxology) "When The Night Is Falling" with Dennis & Annie Herring
- 2006: Gated Community VeggieTales (background vocals; with Matthew West)
- 2009: A Timeless Christmas Israel & New Breed (Integrity) "Hark", "Have Yourself A Merry Little Christmas"
- 2011: Luke: A World Turned Upside Down Michael Card "A World Turned Upside Down"
- 2011: Testimony 2 Neal Morse (background vocals)
- 2022 There's A Rainbow Somewhere (The Songs Of Randy Stonehill), various artists, Song: "Until Your Love Broke Through"
