= Jesus music =

Style of Christian music

- Stylistic origins: Folk music; folk rock; Christian music; psychedelic music
- Cultural origins: Late 1960s – early 1970s, Jesus movement

Other topics
- Christian music

Jesus music, known as gospel beat music in the United Kingdom, is a style of Christian music that originated on the West Coast of the United States in the late 1960s and early 1970s. This musical genre developed in parallel to the Jesus movement and became a defining part of the movement. It outlasted the movement that spawned it and the Christian music industry began to eclipse it and absorb its musicians around 1975.

== History ==
Jesus music primarily began in population centers of the United States where the Jesus movement was gaining momentum—Southern California (especially Costa Mesa and Hollywood), San Francisco, Seattle, and Chicago—around 1969–70. Large numbers of hippies and street musicians began converting to born-again Christianity. A number of these conversions, especially in southern California, were due largely to the outreach of Lonnie Frisbee and Pastor Chuck Smith of Calvary Chapel in Costa Mesa. In the aftermath of such conversions, these musicians continued playing the same styles of music that they had been playing prior to their conversion, though they now infused their lyrics with a Christian message. Of the many bands and artists that came out of this time period, some became leaders within the Jesus movement. Most notably among them Larry Norman, Barry McGuire, Love Song, Second Chapter of Acts, Randy Stonehill, Randy Matthews, and during the mid-1970s, Keith Green.

Much of the music was a blend of folk music and folk rock (Children of the Day, Paul Clark, Nancy Honeytree, Mark Heard, Noel Paul Stookey, Karen Lafferty, Debby Kerner & Ernie Rettino), soft rock (Chuck Girard, Tom Howard, Phil Keaggy, Scott Wesley Brown, Kelly Willard), R&B (Andraé Crouch (and the Disciples)), soul music/jazz fusion (Sweet Comfort Band), country rock (Bethlehem, Daniel Amos, Gentle Faith, The Talbot Brothers: John Michael and Terry Talbot, The Way), Ron Salsbury and JC Power Outlet and hard rock (Agape, All Saved Freak Band, Petra, Resurrection Band, Servant).

Initially, the music tended to be relatively simple, as it drew largely on guitar-based folk and folk-rock influences. The message also seemed to be relatively simple, as the songwriters attempted to present the value of a Christ-centered spiritual experience without evoking the vocabulary or other trappings of ecclesiastical religion. Rather than quoting religious cliches or King James Bible verses, they used storytelling, allegory, imagery, and complex metaphors, often with a colloquial language that flustered conservatives.

In addition to the basic message of salvation, the lyrics often reflected the expectation of the imminent Second Coming of Christ prominent in evangelical circles at the time, reflected and heightened by the publication of The Late, Great Planet Earth. Larry Norman voiced this in his song "I Wish We'd All Been Ready", singing "There's no time to change your mind/The Son has come and you've been left behind."

Despite the message, the music was described by many as worldly at best or as "the Devil's music" in the worst case. This latter position was held by conservatives such as Bill Gothard as taught in his Basic Youth Conflicts Seminars. These were some of the main factors that caused many U.S. churches to largely reject the movement and these artists at the time. This suited many artists as they wanted to bring Jesus to non-Christians, not only to church youth. Larry Norman addressed this culture clash in his 1972 song, "Why Should The Devil Have All the Good Music?"

On the West Coast of the United States, Jesus music festivals began to emerge in the summer months of the early 1970s, featuring many of the artists listed above. While the music was often loud and the venue similar to the Monterey Pop Festival and Woodstock, the atmosphere was decidedly different and attracted large crowds of camping families as well as teenagers and young adults.

By 1973, Jesus music was receiving enough attention inside the mainstream media that an industry began to emerge. By the mid-1970s, the phrase "contemporary Christian music" (CCM) had been coined by Ron Moore and the first edition of CCM Magazine was published in July 1977. CCM now was a combination of traditional gospel music, Southern gospel music, Jesus music artists, and in some cases a style of big-band music with Christian lyrics. By 1976, it was apparent that a new generation of performers who had grown up in the church wanted to play non-secular pop and rock music for other Christians. By the end of the 1970s the term "Jesus music" fell out of use as the movement was replaced by the industry.

== Outside California ==
In the United Kingdom, Parchment, Roger and Jan, Judy McKenzie, Malcolm and Alwyn, Garth Hewitt, Graham Kendrick, Dave and Dana, Len Magee, Adrian Snell, etc. were some of the most notable agents of the gospel beat.

Jesus People USA is an intentional community and ministry, currently located on the North Side of Chicago. Two of the first influences of JPUSA were Cornerstone magazine and Resurrection Band. Jim Palosaari was one of Britain's influential Jesus people and one of the founders of the group that became JPUSA, Servant's Highway Ministries, and Greenbelt festival in England, the largest Christian rock festival in the world.

== See also ==
- Cultural depictions of Jesus
