= Annie Herring =

Singer, songwriter (born 1945)

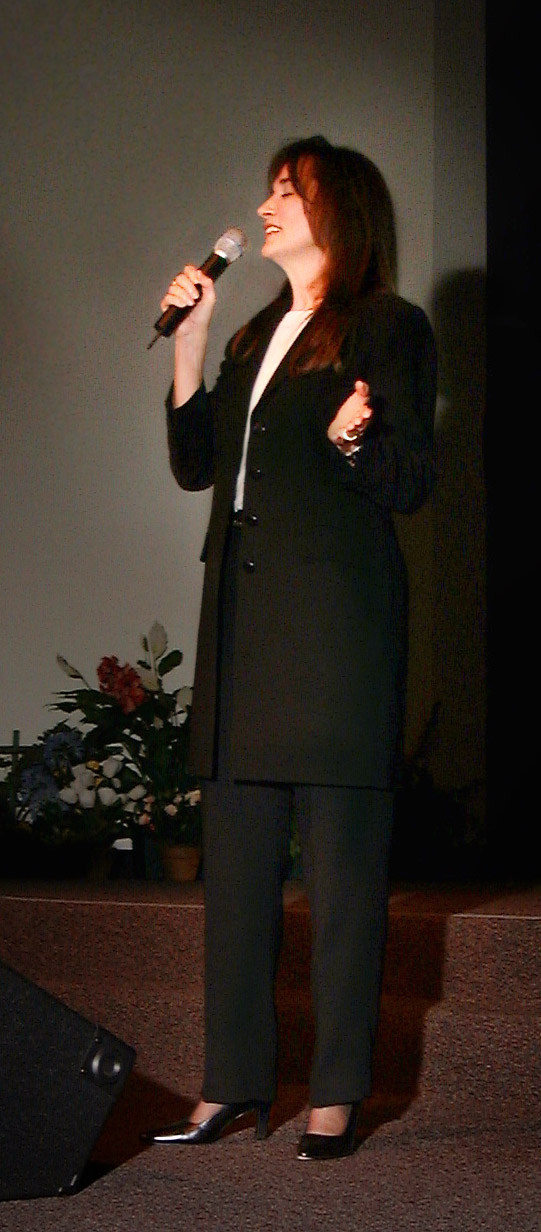
- Annie in concert in Livermore, California, 2001

Background information
- Born: Annie Ward; September 22, 1945 (age 81); North Dakota, United States
- Genres: Contemporary Christian, Jesus music
- Occupations: Singer, songwriter
- Instruments: Voice, piano
- Years active: 1971–present
- Labels: Myrrh, Sparrow, Live Oak, Spring Hill
- Website: annieherring.com

Annie Herring (born Annie Ward September 22, 1945) is one of the pioneers of the Jesus music genre, later to be called Contemporary Christian music. She was a member of the trio 2nd Chapter of Acts, for which she wrote most of the songs and sang lead and harmony vocals with her brother Matthew Ward and sister Nelly (Ward) Greisen. During her musical career with the 2nd Chapter of Acts from 1973 to 1988, she also recorded solo albums.

== Early history ==
Annie Herring's music and ministry was, in no small part, forged from personal family tragedy. In 1968, her mother, Elizabeth Ward, died of a brain tumor; two years later her father, Walter, died of leukemia leaving her youngest sister, Nelly, and brother, Matthew, orphaned. The Ward siblings decided that Annie and her new husband, record producer Buck Herring, should take in the two younger Ward siblings.

She was a self-taught singer and songwriter who wrote and played her songs around the family piano. Her brother and sister would often join in as she played, and eventually they developed extremely tight and intricate harmonies.

As they gradually started singing for local coffee houses and small gatherings, they eventually gained the notice of Pat Boone who arranged a contract to record and release two singles with MGM, "Jesus Is" (1972) and "I'm So Happy" (1973). The fledgling trio also came to the attention of 1960s folk singer Barry McGuire, who had recently become a Christian and was preparing to record his first Christian music album, to be produced by Buck Herring. The siblings provided background vocals for Seeds and McGuire's 1974 follow-up, Lighten Up. The group would take the name "The 2nd Chapter of Acts", and Herring continued to sing with her siblings as part of 2nd Chapter of Acts until 1988, when each member of the group felt called to different careers.

Herring was a guest on 100 Huntley Street, and was included in the "Hall of Honor" in Homecoming Magazine in 2013.

== Solo career ==
During her time with 2nd Chapter, Herring released two solo albums, Through a Child's Eyes and Search Deep Inside, as well as a children's album, Kids of the Kingdom. After 2nd Chapter disbanded, she continued her solo career and continued to tour the US through the 1990s and early 2000s, performing 40 to 50 concerts a year. During that time she continued to receive songs and record solo albums, to which her siblings from 2nd Chapter often added backup vocals. She also occasionally added her vocals to other artist's albums.

Though officially retired from touring, Herring continues to make music and minister privately, as well as take time for more relaxing pursuits such as learning to play golf.

== Discography ==
- 1976: Kids of the Kingdom with Annie Herring (Sparrow Records)
- 1976: Through a Child's Eyes (Sparrow)
- 1981: Search Deep Inside (Sparrow)
- 1989: Flying Lessons (Live Oak Records)
- 1991: Waiting for My Ride to Come (Live Oak)
- 1992: There's a Stirring (Sparrow)
- 1993: All That I Am (Sparrow)
- 1996: Glimpses (Spring Hill)
- 1998: Wonder (Spring Hill)
- 2000: Picture Frames (Spring Hill)
- 2001: Here in My Heart (Baah Records)
- 2006: One on One (Baah)
- 2010: Dance of the Horses and Other Animal Tracks

=== Collaborations and guest appearances ===
- 1974: Come Together: A Musical Experience in Love – Jimmy & Carol Owens; "He is Here"
- 1974: If My People: A Musical Experience in Worship and Intercession – Jimmy & Carol Owens
- 1976: Firewind: A Contemporary Dramatic Musical – Terry Talbot; "New Jerusalem"
- 1978: Sparrow Spotlight Sampler – various artists; "Some Days"
- 1978: The Witness: A Musical of Easter [Soundtrack] – various artists
- 1980: The Glory of Christmas – various artists (Herring portrays Mary, the Mother of Jesus)
- 1980: The Birthday Party Candle ("I Will Shine, I Will Sing")
- 1986: Come Together Again: A Musical Experience in Worship and Commitment – various artists
- 1989: The Lord Reigns – Bob Fitts ("I Stand in Awe")
- 1990: Handel's Young Messiah – various artists; "Behold the Lamb"
- 1990: Love Broke Thru – Phil Keaggy (percussion, background vocals)
- 1992: Let It Rain – Dennis Jernigan; duet on "You Come Raining"
- 1995: Sisters: The Story Goes On – various artists; duet with Bonnie Keen on "Will You Go to the Father for Me?"
- 1998: First Love – various artists; "My Redeemer"
- 1999: Praise 16: Power of Your Love – Maranatha! Music; "Great is the Lord"
- 2002: Edge of the World – Randy Stonehill; "We Were All So Young"

== Publications ==
- 2006: Glimpses: Seeing God in Everyday Life
