= Force of Darkness =

- Force of Darkness
- Directed by: Alan Hauge
- Written by: Jack Baylam
- Starring: Mel Novak; Doug Shanklin; Loren Cedar; Mark Milan; Marlin Fischer; Eddie Hailey; Gordon Rigsby; Eddie Hailey; Donald Sommers
- Cinematography: Ken Lamkin
- Edited by: George Simich
- Music by: Jim Stipech
- Release date: 1985
- Running time: 90 minutes
- Country: United States
- Language: English

Force of Darkness is a 1985 American horror film about demonic possession. A woman witnesses a murder and a detective investigating the case believes the killer was possessed by the devil. It starred Mel Novak, Doug Shanklin, Loren Cedar, Mark Milan, Marlin Fischer, Gordon Rigsby and Eddie Hailey.

== Story ==
This is a film about a man who is under demonic possession. Gloria Ramsey witnesses the murder of her man who is a doctor. Detective Ben Johnson believes that Gloria is innocent of the crime and he goes after the killer who was the doctor's last patient, who has multiple personality disorder. Detective Johnson believes it's demonic possession that is involved. Conrad who is the killer roams the streets looking for victims. Detective Johnson has a job to stop him. The quest takes him to Alcatraz prison. Alcatraz prison is not empty. There are people who are staying there. The killer's possession may be related to demons that reside in Alcatraz. The demons that possess Conrad have an interest in Gloria and they beckon her to come to Alcatraz. A final confrontation is due in the prison that has been closed for 22 years.

== Background ==
The film story was by Jack Baylam.

The video release slick says, The EXORSIST opened the door and now someone has made contact.

=== Possible Christian connection ===
There's a possible Christian connection to the film. Eddie Hailey who played Murry in the film, and Gene Redlon in Another Life had been a born again Christian for some years prior to this film. While on the set of Another Life, he would lead the cast in prayer each morning. Mel Novak who played Conrad in the film has been an ordained Christian pastor for decades. James Gabriel Stipech who composed the music for the film also worked on a pro-life film called The Silent Scream which was released the previous year in 1984. He had been a member of Christian rock band The Way in 1976.

== Cast ==
Judd Hamilton singles
Name	Role	Notes #
Mel Novak	Conrad	
Doug Shanklin	Detective Ben Johnson	Credited as Douglas Alan Shanklin
Loren Cedar	Gloria Ramsey	
Mark Milan	Tom Ramsey	
Marlin Fischer	Ron Hubbard II	
Eddie Hailey	Murry	
Gordon Rigsby	Dr. Rogers	
Christopher Roberts	Prison Guard	
Clifford Hauge	Witness	
Florence Hauge	Witness	
Charles Robert Smithe	Police officer #1	
William Douglas	Police officer #2	
Thomas R. Hess	Police officer #3	Credited as Tom Hess
Deke Anderson	Punk Hoodlum	
