= Jim Stipech =

American Christian musician

- Also known as: James Gabriel Stipech
- Genres: Contemporary Christian; pop; rock
- Occupations: Composer, musician, record producer
- Instruments: Piano, guitar
- Years active: 1960s–present
- Labels: Chalice; Chalace Music
- Formerly of: The Way

Jim Stipech is a Christian musician and record producer who has released recordings under his own name as well as contributing to the work of other artists such as Nancy Honeytree and Roby Duke. He has also provided music for films such as The Silent Scream and Force of Darkness.

== Career ==
=== 1970s ===
In 1970, Stipech was a member of Jonathan Goodlife, a group which was from Reno, Nevada. The group was gaining popularity in the San Francisco Bay area and had been playing at the Old Fillmore. In addition to Stipech, the group consisted of Terry Petersen, Steve Dunwoodie, Jerry Weems, and Jim Mask.

In 1976, he joined Christian rock band, The Way, replacing founding member, Bruce Herring on guitar and vocals, also playing piano. He went on tour with the group a few times.

In 1979, Nancy Honeytree's album Maranatha Marathon was released on the Myrrh label. Stipech not only produced and arranged it, he also played guitar, piano and contributed to the background vocals.

=== 1980s ===
In 1982, his album All That I Am was released. The album was in the mainstream pop mode but without some of the usual commercial aspects. In addition to Stipech on vocals, guitar and keyboard, the album also had Michele Pilar and Kathi Pinto on vocals. Also that year he did some work on Roby Duke's album Not the Same, providing the strings for the track, "Promised Land".

He provided the music for Jack Duane Dabner's anti-abortion film, The Silent Scream which was released in 1984. The film showed an ultrasound view of an abortion of a 13-week fetus. The film was produced by American Portrait Films.

The film, Force of Darkness was released in 1985. It starred Mel Novak, Doug Shanklin, Loren Cedar and Eddie Hailey.

== Discography ==
Albums
| Act | Title | Label & cat | Year | Notes # |
|---|---|---|---|---|
| Jim Stipech & Friends | Thank You for the Music | Chalice CRT-1050 | 1980 | |
| James Gabriel Stipech | All That I Am | Chalace Music CRT-01050 | 1982 | |

== Filmography ==
List
| Title | Director | Year | Role | Notes # |
|---|---|---|---|---|
| The Silent Scream | Jack Duane Dabner | 1984 | Music | |
| Force of Darkness | Alan Hauge | 1985 | Music | |
| Eclipse of Reason | R. Anderson | 1987 | Music | |
