= 1976 California Democratic presidential primary =

- June 8, 1976
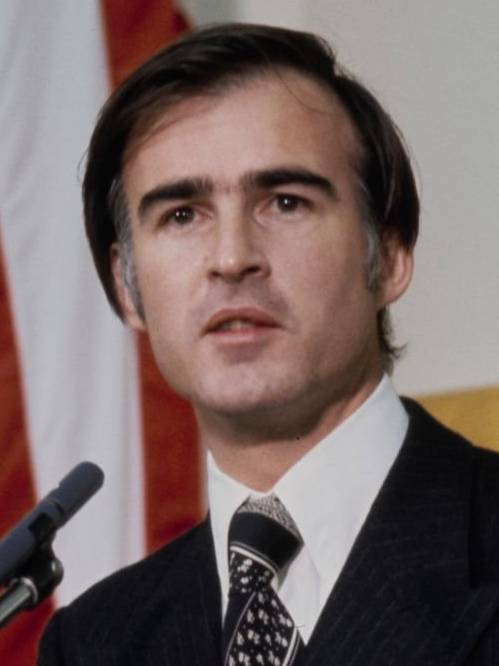

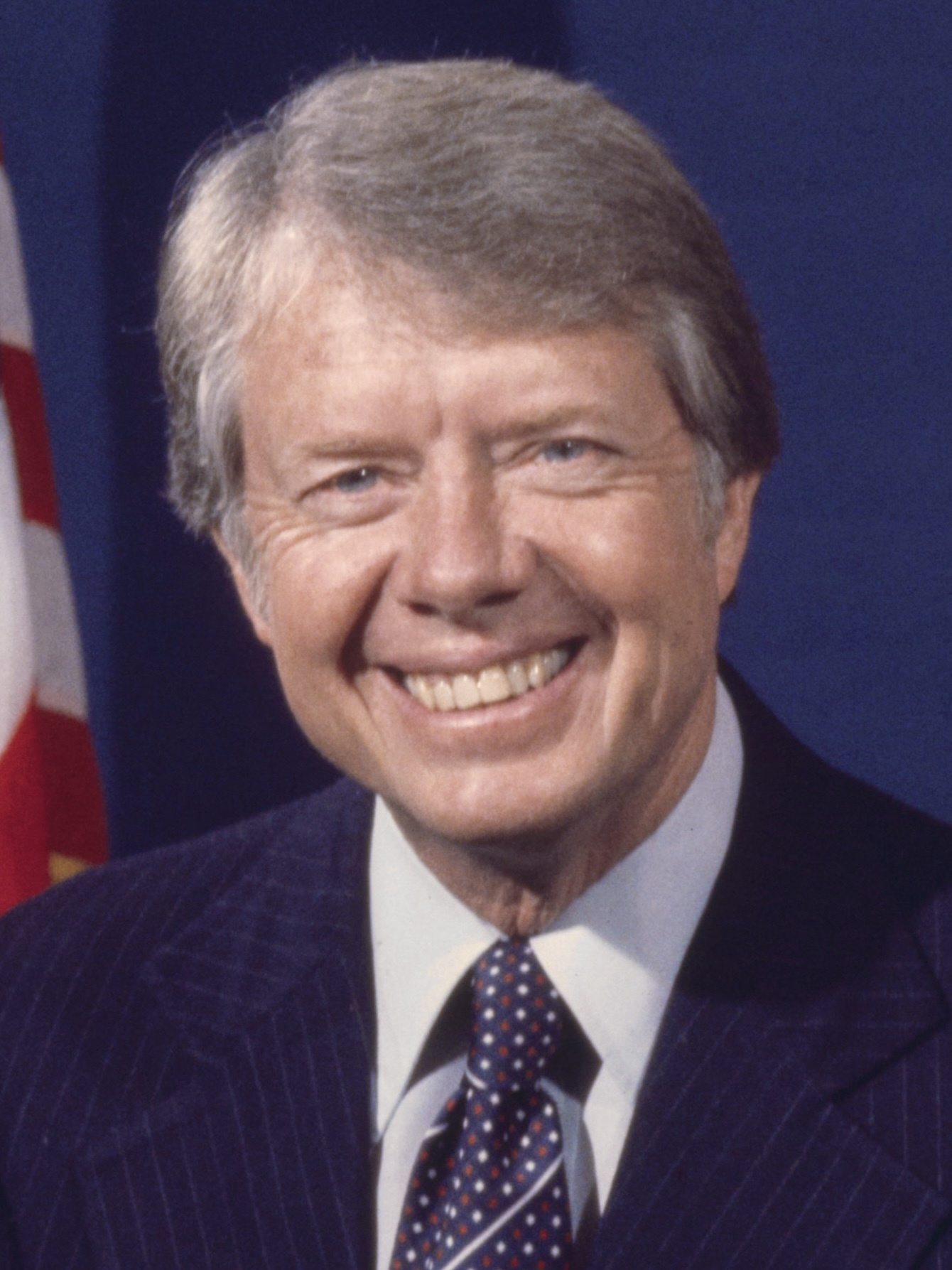

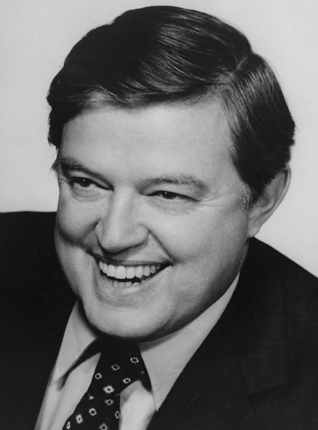

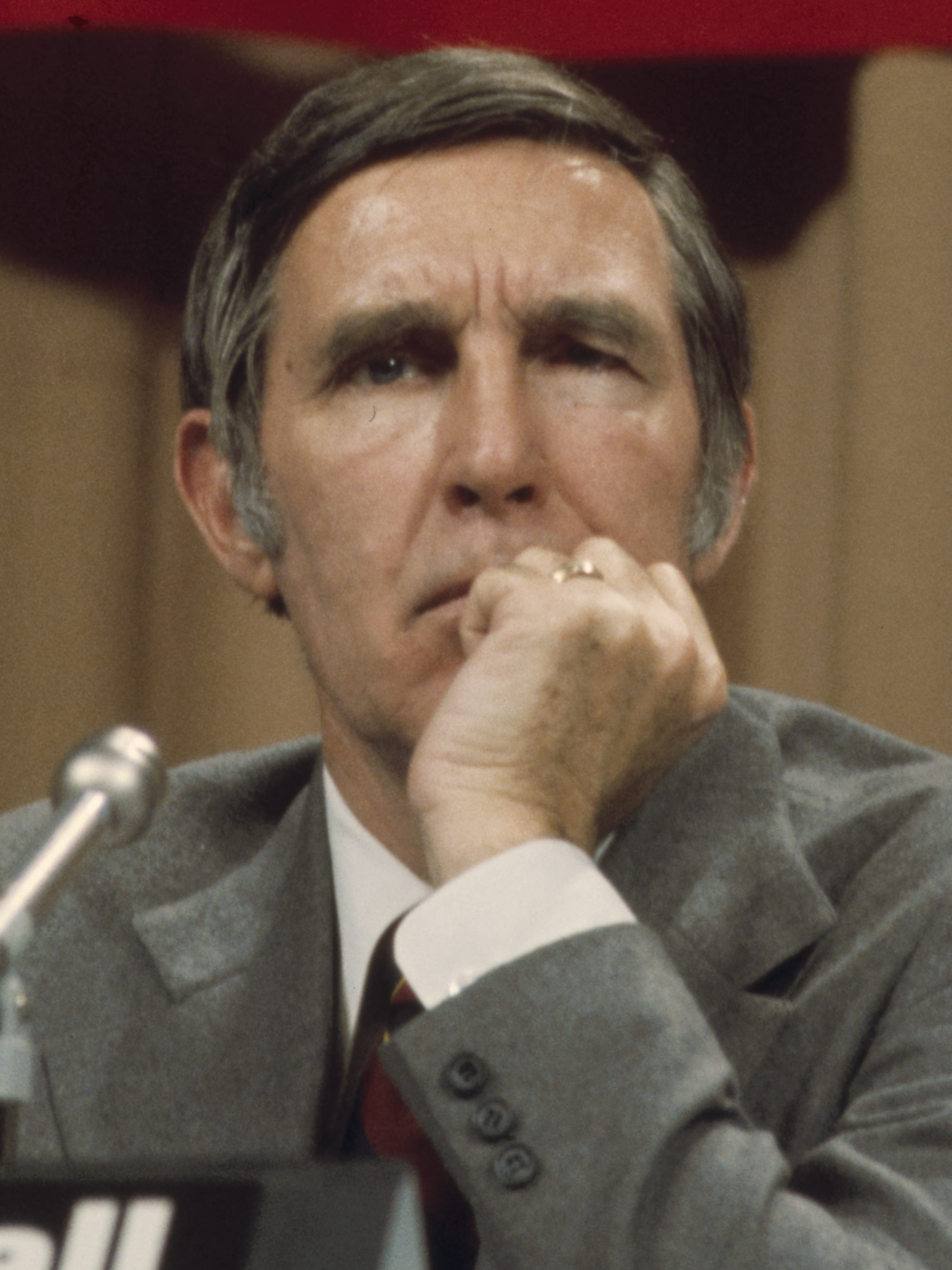
| Candidate | Jerry Brown | Jimmy Carter |
| Home state | California | Georgia |
| Delegate count | 204 | 67 |
| Popular vote | 2,013,210 | 697,092 |
| Percentage | 59.0% | 20.4% |
| Candidate | Frank Church | Mo Udall |
| Home state | Idaho | Arizona |
| Delegate count | 7 | 2 |
| Popular vote | 250,581 | 171,501 |
| Percentage | 7.3% | 5% |
- County results Brown: 30-40% 40-50% 50-60% 60-70%
Previous Democratic nominee
George McGovern
Democratic nominee
Jimmy Carter

The 1976 California Democratic presidential primary was held on June 8, 1976, as one of the Democratic Party presidential primaries ahead of the 1976 United States presidential election. The primary was held alongside the state's Republican Party presidential primary as well as primaries in New Jersey and Ohio. It was one of the last elections before the 1976 Democratic National Convention the following month.

Then incumbent California governor Jerry Brown faced off against Georgia governor Jimmy Carter, as well as a small number of others. Brown won his home state in a blowout, winning every county, but ultimately failed to secure the nomination. Carter would go on to win the nomination and later the presidency, unseating incumbent president Gerald Ford.

== Results ==
1976 California Democratic presidential primary
| Candidate | Votes | % | Delegates |
|---|---|---|---|
| Jerry Brown | 2,013,210 | 59.0% | 204 |
| Jimmy Carter | 697,092 | 20.4% | 67 |
| Frank Church | 250,581 | 7.3% | 7 |
| Mo Udall | 171,501 | 5.0% | 2 |
| George Wallace | 102,292 | 3.0% | 0 |
| Uncommitted | 78,595 | 2.3% | 0 |
| Henry M. "Scoop" Jackson (withdrawn) | 38,634 | 1.1% | 0 |
| Ellen McCormack | 29,424 | 0.9% | 0 |
| Fred R. Harris (withdrawn) | 16,920 | 0.5% | 0 |
| Birch Bayh (withdrawn) | 11,419 | 0.3% | 0 |
| Total: | 3,409,668 | 100.0 | 280 |
