= National Right to Life Committee =

American anti-abortion organization

- Founded: April 1, 1968; 58 years ago
- Founder: National Conference of Catholic Bishops
- Tax ID no.: EIN 52-0986195
- Location: Washington, D.C., United States
- Members: 7 million
- Key people: Carol Tobias, president James Bopp, general council
- Revenue: $5,717,028 (2012–2013)
- Expenses: $6,288,548 (2012–2013)
- Website: nrlc.org

The National Right to Life Committee (NRLC) is the oldest and largest national anti-abortion organization in the United States with affiliates in all 50 states and more than 3,000 local chapters nationwide. (Note: The oldest state pro-life organization in the US is Virginia Society for Human Life which was founded in 1967. • Nation's Oldest Right to Life Organization Supporting Thompson Standard News Wire.com, December 20. Retrieved: September 9, 2013. • Fred Thompson Receives the Endorsement of Virginia Society for Human Life Presidency Project UCSB.EDU, December 20, 2007. Retrieved: September 9, 2013.) It was founded in 1968 by future bishop James T. McHugh the National Conference of Catholic Bishops.

Since the 1980s, NRLC has influenced abortion policy at national and state levels through campaign financing of anti-abortion (and almost exclusively Republican) candidates and writing model legislation that would restrict or ban abortion.

== History ==
=== National Conference of Catholic Bishops: 1968–73 ===
In 1966 the National Conference of Catholic Bishops (NCCB) asked James T. McHugh to begin observing trends in the reform of policy on abortion. At the time then McHugh was Director of the United States Catholic Conference (USCC) Family Life Bureau, and later became the Bishop of Camden and then of Rockville Centre. The NCCB asked McHugh during its annual conference in April 1967 to organize the National Right to Life Committee (NRLC) and fund the established NRLC with $50,000 to "initiate and coordinate a program of information" with state affiliates that would inform stakeholders of the wave of proposed state legislation to liberalize statutes prohibiting abortion.

The National Right to Life Committee was formalized in 1968. McHugh hired executive assistant Michael Taylor to help with the day-to-day needs of the organization. In October 1968, they published the first NRLC newsletter formally introducing the organization and providing information on the efforts to change abortion laws. On the state level, independent right to life organizations were beginning to form and began to rely on NRLC for direction and information. The newsletter lasted until 1971.

NRLC held its first meeting of nationwide anti-abortion leaders in Chicago, Illinois, in 1970 at Barat College. New Jersey attorney Juan Ryan served as the first President of NRLC. In the following year NRLC held its first convention at Macalester College in Saint Paul, Minnesota.

"The only reason that we have a pro-life movement in this country is because of the Catholic people and the Catholic Church", stated the executive director of NRLC James T. McHugh in 1973.

=== Incorporation and Human Life Amendment ===
The NRLC was formally incorporated in May 1973, in response to the Roe v. Wade ruling of the US Supreme Court and the desire to gain autonomy apart from the Catholic Church, to attract more Protestants to the organization. The National Conference of Catholic Bishops launched a campaign to amend the United States Constitution by enacting a Human Life Amendment that not only invalidated Roe v. Wade but also prohibited both the US Congress and the States from legalizing abortion in the United States. Its first convention as an incorporated organization was held the following month in Detroit, Michigan. At the concurrent meeting of NRLC's Board, Ed Golden of New York was elected president. Among the founding members was Mildred Jefferson, the first African-American woman to graduate from Harvard Medical School. Jefferson subsequently served as president in 1975.

=== Schisms ===
Erma Clardy Craven spoke out against the increasing alignment of anti-abortion groups and the American right. In 1978, NRLC found itself $100,000 in debt after Jefferson's presidency. Rather than acknowledge her record, she left the organization to form the Right to Life Crusade. On April 1, 1979, the American Life League (ALL) was founded by Judie Brown, former public relations director of NRLC, and 9 others after a schism within the NRLC.

=== Media publicity ===
Since its incorporation, the NRLC prioritized its politics over getting publicity due to its concern of being portrayed in a poor light and due to its lack of funds. By 1980 NRLC's annual budget increased to $1,600,000 and retained a membership of 11 million, allowing the organization to invest in media strategy and establish its media department in 1984. By 1985, the organization had a communications department that produced and distributed a radio program, media campaigns, and maintained press connections. Its media strategy worked to create a public image that differentiated the NRLC from allies by using medical professionals, including its president and primary spokesperson John Willke. One hallmark of their media campaign was utilizing the slogan "Love them Both" which embraces claims of women's rights and welfare through compassion to gain the support of those ambivalent on the issue.

In 1995, the NRLC coined the term "partial-birth abortion" to describe a new medical procedure also known as "dilation and extraction," or D&X, and "intact D&E" in which the fetus is removed intact from the uterus after 20 weeks gestation. The organization illustrated and published drawings of the procedure in booklets and paid newspaper advertisements to generate public opposition to both the procedure and abortion in general. The NRLC criticized Bill Clinton's 1995 veto of a bill that would ban the procedure. The phrase was used by Congress in the Partial-Birth Abortion Ban Act of 2003.

In 1992 and 1998, Fortune magazine recognized the NRLC as the most publicly recognized and politically effective anti-abortion organization. In 1999, Fortune ranked them as the 8th most influential public policy group working in Washington, DC.

=== The Silent Scream ===
In 1984 the Committee co-produced the documentary The Silent Scream on abortion with Bernard Nathanson. In 1985, following 2 years of a boycott of a product of the Upjohn Company that NRLC coordinated, the Company ceased all research on abortifacient drugs. Three years later, NRLC joined other anti-abortion organizations in saying that if any company sold an abortifacient drug, the millions of Americans who opposed abortion would boycott all the products of that company.

=== NRLC boycott of Hoechst Marion Roussel and Altace ===
In the 1990s the NRLC began a nationwide grassroots lobbying campaign against the Freedom of Choice Act, and announced a boycott of the French pharmaceutical company Roussel Uclaf and its American affiliates for permitting its abortion drug, mifepristone, into the United States. The U.S. National Right to Life Committee announced a 1994 U.S. boycott of all Hoechst pharmaceutical products including Altace, targeting the abortion pill RU-486.

According to Keri Folmar, the lawyer responsible for the language of the Partial-Birth Abortion Ban Act, the term "partial-birth abortion" was developed in early 1995 at a meeting of herself, Charles T. Canady, and NRLC lobbyist Douglas Johnson. The phrase elicited strong negative reactions from a focus group and became a key phrase in NRLC's attack on abortion.

=== Campaign financing ===
In 1978, James Bopp was hired to serve as legal counsel and the NRLC became more involved in elections to further influence state and federal legislation to advance their anti-abortion position. In 1980, the National Right to Life Political Action Committee (NRL PAC) was founded to support anti-abortion candidates, mostly Republicans. Also that year, Bopp led a walkout of conservative delegates from a White House Conference on Families and defended the NRLC's 1980 presidential election voter guides from legal challenges of improper electioneering by a nonprofit.

By the 1990s, the NRLC became a major player in campaign financing through its $2 million campaign contributions in the 1996 presidential election. In 1999, the NRLC aggressively lobbied against the 1999 Shays-Meehan bill, which later became the Bipartisan Campaign Reform Act of 2002 (BCRA), because it would reclassify many of its and other nonpartisan groups' ads as campaign contributions. A bipartisan group of legislators including John McCain, Ronnie Shows, and Zach Wamp criticized the organization for getting involved in issues that did not affect the unborn. Legislative Director Douglas Johnson defended the NRLC's involvement in campaign financing, saying that the bill "would cripple the prolife movement."

In 2003, Bopp filed a lawsuit on behalf of the NRLC against the Federal Election Commission about whether BCRA violates the First Amendment in its prohibition of the use of "soft money" in campaign financing. On May 1, 2003, the district court issued judgment on the case and the NRLC appeals to the Supreme Court. Later that year, the case was consolidated along with eleven other lawsuits into McConnell v. FEC. In the ruling, the Supreme Court upheld the control of soft money and the regulation of electioneering communications in BCRA.

The death of Justice William Rehnquist and retirement of Justice Sandra Day O’Connor changed the Supreme Court to a conservative majority, and in 2007 NRLC's affiliate Wisconsin Right to Life brought a case against the FEC again challenging BCRA provisions. In FEC v. Wisconsin Right to Life, Inc., the justices held that issue ads may not be banned from the months preceding a primary or general election.

=== Model legislation strategy ===
At the national and state level, NRLC writes model legislation that lawmakers can utilize in bills to restrict or ban abortion. Their legislation is written with the composition of the Supreme Court in mind, so that the court would be less likely to block it afterwards. For instance, when Justice Anthony Kennedy was on the bench, bills were introduced that would ban abortion after 20 weeks. After the conservative Gorsuch, Barrett and Kavanaugh were appointed, legislations began to pass trigger laws.

Prior to the ruling on Dobbs v. Jackson Women's Health Organization, NRLC released model legislation that bans all abortions unless "necessary to prevent the death of the pregnant woman". Enforcement strategies of the legislation include criminal penalties for anyone aiding or abetting a person seeking an abortion, selling or distributing of abortifacients, and transporting a pregnant minor to obtain an abortion.

==== In cases of rape ====
In 2022, responding to reports that a 10-year-old rape victim obtained an abortion, the group's general counsel James Bopp said that the group's proposed legislation would have banned that abortion; he also said that they believed she should have carried the baby, and "as many women who have had babies as a result of rape, we would hope that she would understand the reason and ultimately the benefit of having the child."

== Affiliates ==
NRLC has affiliates in all fifty states and over 3,000 local chapters.

Its Virginia affiliate, the Virginia Society for Human Life, was founded in 1967 as the first state right to life organization. Other state and local affiliates include:

- Georgia Right to Life
- Kentucky Right to Life
- Minnesota Citizens Concerned for Life
  - Northern Kentucky Right to Life
- Oregon Right to Life
- Right to Life of Michigan
- Wisconsin Right to Life

== Past presidents ==
- 1968–1973 – Juan Ryan, New Jersey
- 1973–1974 – Edward Golden, New York
- 1974–1975 – Kenneth VanDerHoef, Washington
- 1975–1978 – Mildred Jefferson, Massachusetts
- 1978–1980 – Carolyn Gerster, Arizona
- 1980–1983 – John C. Willke, Ohio
- 1983–1984 – Jean Doyle, Florida
- 1984–1991 – John C. Willke, Ohio
- 1991–2005 – Wanda Franz, West Virginia
- 2005–present – Carol Tobias, North Dakota

== See also ==
- Eclipse of Reason
- Right to life
- Susan B. Anthony Pro-Life America
