= The Way (1973 album) =

Studio album by The Way
- Released: 1973
- Genre: Jesus music
- Length: 37:37
- Label: Maranatha!
- Producer: The Way

The Way chronology
The Way (1973)	Can It Be? (1975)

The Way is the self-titled debut album recorded by Jesus music band The Way, released in 1973 on Maranatha! Records.

== Track listing ==
Side one
No.	Title	Writer(s)	Length
1.	"Son Come Out"	Dana Angle	3:58
2.	"You're Caught in a World"	John Wickham, Angle	4:10
3.	"Song of Joy"	Gary Arthur, Angle	3:30
4.	"Come on Down"	Arthur, Angle	3:45
5.	"Closer to God"	Arthur	4:43

Side two
No.	Title	Writer(s)	Length
1.	"New Song"	Bruce Herring	3:45
2.	"There's a Love"	Angle	2:44
3.	"He's the Reason to Go On"	Herring	2:56
4.	"Harvest Time"	Herring, Angle	4:42
5.	"Are You Listening"	Angle	3:24
Total length:			37:37

== Personnel ==
- The Way – producer
- Buck Herring – engineer
- Buddy King – engineer
- Buddy King Studio, Huntington Beach, California – recording location
- Mama Jo's, North Hollywood California – recording location for "New Song" and "Song of Joy" and remixing location
- Chuck Johnson – remixer
- Gary Arthur – design
- Neal Buchanan – art
- Woody Blackburn – photography
- Tracy Guthrie – clay sculptures for front cover
- Tom Stipe – special thanks
- Chuck Butler – special thanks
- Tom Coomes – special thanks
- Chuck Girard – special thanks
