= Wanda Franz =

American anti-abortion lobbyist and activist

Wanda Franz (born 1944) is a West Virginian anti-abortion lobbyist and activist.

== Biography ==
Franz spent her childhood in post-World War II Germany, where her father was stationed. In the 1970s, she attended West Virginia University (WVU) to obtain her doctorate in psychology. While attending WVU, she was asked to speak to anti-abortion activists where she connected her experience in Germany to anti-abortion activism. As a graduate student in 1971, she joined the WVU Right to Life Club.

In 1983, she served as a consultant for the Office of Population Affairs in the Reagan and Bush administrations until 1991. In 1983, Franz wrote the introduction to Reagan's book Abortion and the Conscience of the Nation.

From 1991 to 2011, she was the President of the National Right to Life Committee (NRLC). During her tenure as president, Fortune magazine recognized the organization twice as the "most publicly recognized and politically effective pro-life organization." She was also the host of NRLC's daily five-minute radio program, Pro-Life Perspective, for 20 years.

Franz is president of West Virginians for Life, the largest anti-abortion group in West Virginia, first serving from 1975 to 1990 and then getting the position again in 2011. She is working towards the creation of an amendment that specifies that "nothing in this [United States'] Constitution secures or protects a right to abortion."

Franz retired from her professor of psychology position at WVU in 2003. After retirement, she became a professor emerita of child development in the Division of Family and Consumer Sciences at WVU.

Franz is also President of the James Madison Center for Free Speech, which was co-founded by Senator Mitch McConnell and attorney James Bopp Jr.

== Personal life ==
Franz was married to her husband for 53 years and had three children and 12 grandchildren.
