= Susan Scannell =

American actress

- Born: Astoria, Queens, New York City, U.S.
- Occupation: Actress
- Years active: 1978-present
- Spouses: Christopher Roland (m. 1983; div. 1985) Robert P. Gilbert (m. 2013)

Susan Scannell is an American actress known for her roles in television soap operas.

== Early years ==
Originally from Lexington, Massachusetts, Scannell studied musical theater at the University of New Hampshire.

== Career ==
Scannell began as a model in New York with the Eileen Ford modelling agency, where her first booking resulted in being on the September 1978 cover of Seventeen. She lived at the Rehearsal Club in Manhattan and sang in various clubs around the city.

Scannell played Becky Hewitt on Another Life from 1981 to 1982, and Kristin Carter on Search for Tomorrow from 1982 to 1984. She next portrayed Nicole Simpson De Vilbis Colby on the primetime soap opera Dynasty from 1984 to 1985, followed by a stint as Chessy Blake/Gabrielle Dubujak on Ryan's Hope in 1985. She also appeared on One Life to Live (1986) and All My Children (1990, 1991), and had guest starring roles on The A-Team and Remington Steele.

Scannell left Hollywood after a "me too" experience, moved to Astoria, Queens, and was the founding executive director of Astoria Performing Arts. In 2006 she moved to Massachusetts.

== Personal life ==
Scannell is divorced from actor Christopher Roland, who had worked with her on Another Life playing Russ Weaver. She married Robert P. Gilbert on September 13, 2014, and formed Gilbert Entertainment after moving to Massachusetts in 2006.

== Filmography ==
=== Television ===
Year	Title	Role	Notes
1981–1982	Another Life	Becky Hewitt / Becky Hewitt-Weaver	5 episodes
1982–1983	Search for Tomorrow	Kristin Carter Emerson	134 episodes
1984–1985	Dynasty	Nicole Simpson	14 episodes
1985	Ryan's Hope	Gabrielle Dubujak	18 episodes
1985	The A-Team	Kelly	Episode: "Uncle Buckle-Up"
1986	Remington Steele	Maxine Gilroy	Episode: "Sensitive Steele"
2016	Who Does That?	Lilly's friend	Episode: "Cheapskate"
