= Center for Reproductive and Sexual Health =

Health clinic in New York City, US

Center for Reproductive and Sexual Health (CRASH), at the time the largest freestanding abortion clinic in the world, opened in New York City after New York legalized abortion in 1970. It was run for a time by Bernard Nathanson.

CRASH was ordered closed for 60 days by the New York State Health Department on September 30, 1988, following the death of a 19-year-old patient from anesthesia errors. A department spokesman said that the 60-day closure was the most they were empowered to do, and that they would push for revocation of the facility's permit. CRASH, the department indicated, was an "imminent danger" to its patients because it lacked a supervising anesthesiologist, proper equipment and procedures for monitoring patients under anesthesia, and the necessary equipment and procedures for resuscitating patients. It never re-opened.

The clinic's medical director, Dr. David Gluck, had lost his medical license earlier in the year after being convicted of using and selling prescription drugs, but had obtained a court order to block the revocation.
