= Erma Clardy Craven =

American anti-abortion activist

- Born: November 2, 1918; Minneapolis, Minnesota, U.S.
- Died: May 19, 1994 (aged 75)
- Education: College of St. Scholastica
- Occupation: Anti-abortion activist

Erma Clardy Craven (November 2, 1918 – June 19, 1994) was an African-American anti-abortion activist and leader in several anti-abortion advocacy groups, including the National Right to Life Committee and Minnesota Citizens Concerned for Life.

== Biography ==
=== Early life and education ===
Craven was born in Minneapolis, Minnesota, and attended South High School. She then attended the College of St. Scholastica in Duluth, Minnesota, where she earned her bachelor's in social work. After she graduated, she worked in an ammunition plant supporting the American World War II effort. She returned to Minneapolis in the 1950s, at one point serving on the Mayor's Commission on Human Rights.

=== Activism ===
Craven published multiple works on the topic of abortion during her lifetime. In 1972, she published an essay titled "Abortion, Poverty and Black Genocide: Gifts to the Poor?" The work has since become a "classic read for [anti-abortion] activists across the country". This reflected her lifelong concern that abortion functioned as a form of eugenics against African Americans by the federal government.

Craven long favored education about birth control instead of abortion, and was concerned about the increasing alliance between anti-abortion activists and conservatives in the United States during the 20th century. She believed the focus should be on systemic issues like poverty, lack of opportunity and healthcare access. Believing that protecting the unborn should be a progressive, humanitarian duty rather than a right-wing platform, she actively worked to keep the issue visible within the Democratic party. In 1976, Craven addressed the Democratic National Convention, where she seconded the presidential nomination of Ellen McCormack.

== Personal life ==
Craven described herself as a "liberal democrat and a radical Methodist." Craven had at least one son, James Craven, who is an actor.
