= Can It Be? =

Studio album by The Way
- Released: 1975
- Studio: Mama Jo's, North Hollywood
- Genre: Jesus music
- Length: 32:34
- Label: Maranatha!
- Producer: Al Perkins

The Way chronology
The Way (1973)	Can It Be? (1975)

Can It Be? is the second album recorded by the Jesus music band The Way, released in 1975 on Maranatha! Records.

== Track listing ==
Side one
No.	Title	Writer(s)	Length
1.	"A Cowboy's Dream"	Bruce Herring	3:14
2.	"Days of Noah"	John M. Wickham	4:02
3.	"I've Been Sealed"	Dana P. Angle	3:16
4.	"Do You Feel the Change"	Dana P. Angle	5:16

Side two
No.	Title	Writer(s)	Length
1.	"Livin' on the Bottle"	Dana P. Angle	3:58
2.	"Sittin' in the Pew"	Dana P. Angle & Bruce Herring	4:09
3.	"Bearded Young Man"	Dana P. Angle	3:49
4.	"Can It Be?"	Kelly W. Diederich	4:50
Total length:			32:34

== Personnel ==
The Way

- John Wickham – lead guitar, bass, acoustic guitar, background vocals
- Gary Arthur – bass guitar, acoustic guitar, synthesizer, background vocals
- Alex MacDougall – drums, congas and timbales, percussion
- Dana Angle – lead and slide guitar, banjo, acoustic guitar & vocals
- Bruce Herring – acoustic guitar, bass, vocals

Additional personnel

- Al Perkins – producer, mixing, pedal steel guitar on "A Cowboy's Dream"
- Bill Taylor – engineer, mixing
- Mama Jo's, North Hollywood, California – recording location
- Bernie Grundman – mastering
- Dave Diggs – string arrangements on "Bearded Young Man"
- Michael Excalente – keyboards except on "A Cowboy's Dream"
- Dave Diggs – keyboards on "A Cowboy's Dream"
- Don Dixon – front cover airbrush
- Daniel Agulian – inside photo
- Dana Angle – album concept
- Neal Buchanan – design and artwork

Note: special thanks to Jesus Christ our Lord
