= James Madison Center for Free Speech =

Legal defense organization in the US

The James Madison Center for Free Speech is a legal defense organization in Terre Haute, Indiana, United States.

== Overview ==
The James Madison Center was founded by Republican Senator Mitch McConnell in 1997 with help from Betsy and Richard DeVos. Its general counsel is James Bopp. The non-profit was founded to protect political expression as part of the First Amendment and to counter the American Civil Liberties Union's campaign finance work. The Center provides free legal services to underfunded clients.

In 2020, the Corporate Officers and Board of Directors of the Center are: Wanda Franz, President; Darla St. Martin, Secretary; and David N. O'Steen, Treasurer. The Board doesn't play an active role in governing the organization, delegating management to Bopp.

It has supported the recognition of the Ten Commandments as one of America's founding texts. It opposed a measure proposed by the Federal Election Commission to ban nonprofits from expressing views on public policy.

== Controversy ==
In 2013, the Citizens for Responsibility and Ethics in Washington (CREW) filed a complaint with the IRS that the James Madison Center misrepresented its activities by diverting a majority of its funds to Bopp's law firm and was in "violation of prohibitions against using charitable organizations for private inurement and private benefit." Bopp countered the complaint by calling it a smear campaign by CREW.

According to journalist Jane Mayer, James Bopp's law firm and the Madison Center have the same address and phone number, and "virtually every dollar from donors" goes or went as of 2016 to Bopp's law firm.
