= Bernard Nathanson =

American physician, activist, and writer (1926–2011)

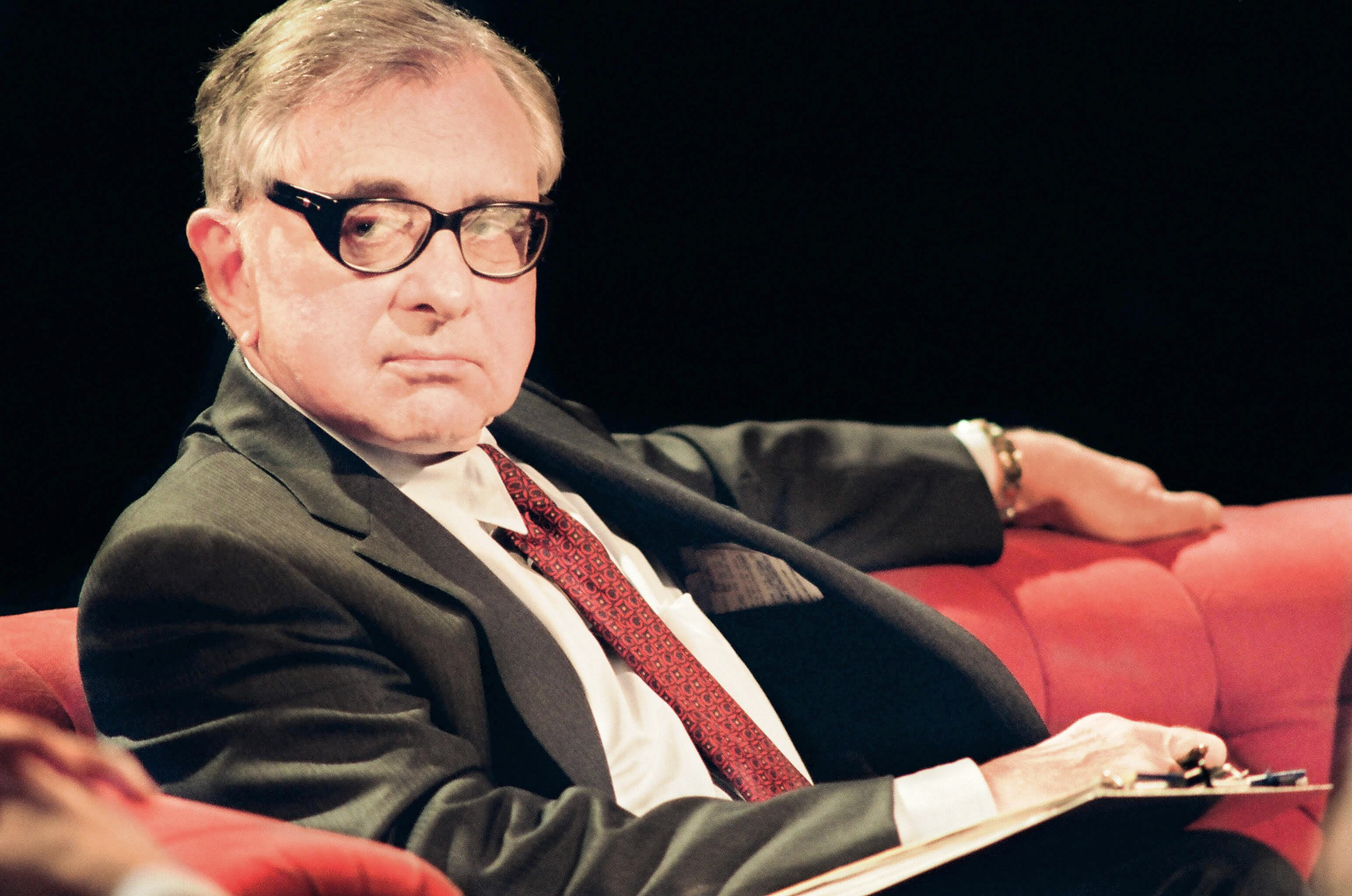
Nathanson appearing on British TV discussion programme After Dark in 1997

Bernard N. Nathanson (July 31, 1926 – February 21, 2011) was an American physician, abortion rights advocate turned anti-abortion activist, and a prominent figure in the abortion debate in the United States. He was originally a co-founder in 1969 of the National Association for the Repeal of Abortion Laws (NARAL), later renamed National Abortion Rights Action League and the former director of New York City's Center for Reproductive and Sexual Health. He was the narrator for the controversial 1984 anti-abortion film The Silent Scream.

== Early life and education ==
Nathanson was born in New York City in Manhattan to a Jewish family. His father, Dr. Joseph Norman Nathanson, was an obstetrician/gynecologist, the same career that Nathanson held in his professional life. His mother was Harriet Nathanson. His father exposed him early to the medical profession. Though he attended Hebrew school during childhood, his family maintained a largely secular approach to religion, which shaped Nathanson’s early worldview.

Nathanson earned his undergraduate degree at Cornell University in 1943 through an accelerated program. He attended medical school in 1945 at McGill University Faculty of Medicine in Montreal, later earning his medical degree in 1949. Nathanson's post-graduate training followed an internship at Michael Reese Hospital in Chicago and a residency at St. Luke's Hospital in New York for four years.

== Career ==
Nathanson was licensed to practice medicine in New York state in 1953. Soon after residency, he joined the United States Air Force, where he worked as an obstetrician and gynecologist for several years until establishing his own practice in his hometown, Manhattan. He was inspired to increase access to legal abortions due to his experience treating poor women who had undergone illegal abortions, which he believed were the primary cause of death among pregnant women. Nathanson became board-certified in obstetrics and gynecology in 1960. He was for a time the director of the Center for Reproductive and Sexual Health (CRASH), then the largest free-standing abortion facility in the world.

In 1974, he wrote: "There is no longer serious doubt in my mind that human life exists within the womb from the very onset of pregnancy, despite the fact that the nature of the intrauterine life has been the subject of considerable dispute in the past." He also wrote of his certainty that he conducted the deaths of over 60,000 lives. He continued to perform an abortion on a woman whom he had impregnated, this being quite a traumatic experience for him. Nathanson's last performed abortion was on a woman with cancer in late 1978 or early 1979.

== Activism ==
=== Pro-abortion rights ===
Originally an abortion rights activist, Nathanson gained national attention as one of the founding members, along with Lawrence Lader, of the National Association for the Repeal of Abortion Laws (later renamed the National Abortion Rights Action League, and now known as Reproductive Freedom for All). He worked with Betty Friedan and others for the legalization of abortion in the United States. Their efforts essentially succeeded with the Roe v. Wade (1973) decision. Nathanson's commitment to this cause was driven by concerns over the health risks associated with illegal abortions and a belief in women's autonomy over reproductive decisions. Nathanson's early activism played a significant role in advancing women's reproductive rights during that era.

=== Anti-abortion ===
With the development of ultrasound in the 1970s, Nathanson had the chance to observe a real-time abortion. This led him to reconsider his views on abortion. He is often quoted as saying that abortion is "the most atrocious holocaust in the history of the United States". He wrote the book Aborting America in which he discussed what he called "the dishonest beginnings of the abortion movement". In 1983, Nathanson debated Henry Morgentaler for an hour on a Canadian national superstation.

In 1984, Nathanson directed and narrated a film titled The Silent Scream, in co-operation with the National Right to Life Committee, which contained the ultrasound video of a mid-term (12 weeks) abortion. His second documentary, Eclipse of Reason, dealt with late-term abortions. He stated that the numbers he once cited for Naral concerning the number of deaths linked to illegal abortions were "false figures". Referring to his previous work as an abortion provider and abortion rights activist, he wrote in his 1996 autobiography Hand of God: "I am one of those who helped usher in this barbaric age." Nathanson developed what he called the "vector theory of life", which states that from the moment of conception there exists "a self-directed force of life that, if not interrupted, will lead to the birth of a human baby."

Despite his drastic change in beliefs, Nathanson claimed to have genuine women's rights as his priority. He argued that abortion exploited women rather than empowering them. This was based on his belief that women were often pressured into choosing abortion due to factors like financial instability, lack of support, or societal pressures, rather than having a truly free choice. Nathanson also criticized the abortion industry for profiting from women's vulnerability and accused the feminist movement of manipulating women’s rights rhetoric to promote abortion. In his view, true support for women’s rights meant providing alternatives that supported women and their unborn children.

== Religious conversion ==
Despite Nathanson growing up Jewish, for more than 10 years even after he became anti-abortion, he described himself as an atheist.

In 1996, Nathanson converted to Catholicism through the efforts of Fr C. John McCloskey and psychiatrist Karl Stern. In December 1996, Nathanson was baptized by Cardinal John O'Connor of New York in a private Mass with a group of friends at St. Patrick's Cathedral. He also received Confirmation and First Communion from the cardinal. Nathanson's increasing participation in the anti-abortion movement along with his contemplations on the ethical ramifications of his prior job in abortion services had an impact on this change. When asked why he converted to Catholicism, he stated that "no religion matches the special role for forgiveness that is afforded by the Catholic Church".

== Personal life and death ==
Nathanson married four times; his first three marriages ended in divorce. From his second marriage to Rosemary, he had a son named Joseph. Following his conversion to Catholicism in 1996, Nathanson married Christine Reisner in a church ceremony officiated by Father C. John McCloskey. He died of cancer in New York on February 21, 2011, at the age of 84. His wife Christine remained with him until his death, along with his son Joseph, from his second marriage.

His funeral Mass was held on February 28, 2011, at St. Patrick's Cathedral, the same church where he had been baptized. Archbishop Timothy Dolan presided over the service, which was attended by his wife Christine, his son Joseph, and numerous members of the pro-life community.

Deep guilt for his role in the abortion industry marked Nathanson's later years. He committed himself to anti-abortion activity and performed penance, including fasting periods, his own metamorphosis frequently compared to that of St. Paul by the public.

== Works ==
- Aborting America, Garden City, NY: Doubleday, 1979. ISBN 0-385-14461-X. Free to read at Internet Archive
- The Silent Scream (1984 documentary). 1979 film free to view on Internet Archive
- The Abortion Papers: Inside the Abortion Mentality. New York: Frederick Fell, 1983. ISBN 0-8119-0593-4. Free to read at Internet Archive
- Eclipse of Reason (1987 documentary).
- The Hand of God: A Journey from Death to Life by the Abortion Doctor Who Changed His Mind. Washington, D.C.: Regnery, 1996. ISBN 0-89526-463-3. Free to read at Internet Archive.
