= The Way (Jesus music band) =

Jesus music band

The Way was a Jesus music band who were active from 1971 to 1976. They released two albums on Maranatha! Records and contributed four non-LP tracks to their label's compilation series and one LP track was pulled for the first label retrospective.

== History ==
The first recordings by The Way appeared on the Maranatha! compilation albums, The Everlastin' Living Jesus Music Concert with the song "If You Will Believe", and Maranatha! 2 with "Jesus Is the One" and "Jesus Is All that We Need".

Their self-titled debut album was recorded at Buddy King Studios in Huntington Beach. It was self-produced and had a smooth mixture of folk and country rock that reminds the listener of America.

With their second album the band took a giant step by adding more of a rock edge to many of the songs while staying true to their country roots. It was recorded at Mama Jo's in North Hollywood and produced by Al Perkins. It was recorded in the nighttime and early-morning hours, because of Ambrosia's daytime sessions.

In 1974 they also recorded a song for the Maranatha! 4 compilation entitled "Have You Ever Heard". In 1979, the song "He's the Reason to Go On", off their debut album, was used by the label on Best of Maranatha, Volume 1.

== Members ==
- Ric Latendresse—(founding member), acoustic guitar (1971)
- John Wickham—lead guitar, bass, acoustic guitar, background vocals
- Gary Arthur—(founding member) bass, acoustic guitar, piano, percussion, vocals
- Dana Angle—(founding member) lead & slide guitar, banjo, acoustic guitar, flute, vocals
- Bruce Herring—(founding member) guitar, bass, vocals
- Alex MacDougall—drums, congas & timbales, percussion (1975)
- Micheal Fickling—drums (1976)
- Jim Stipech (also known as James Gabriel)—guitar, piano, vocals (1976)

== Discography ==
- The Way—(1973)
- Can It Be?—(1975)
