= Ellen McCormack =

American politician

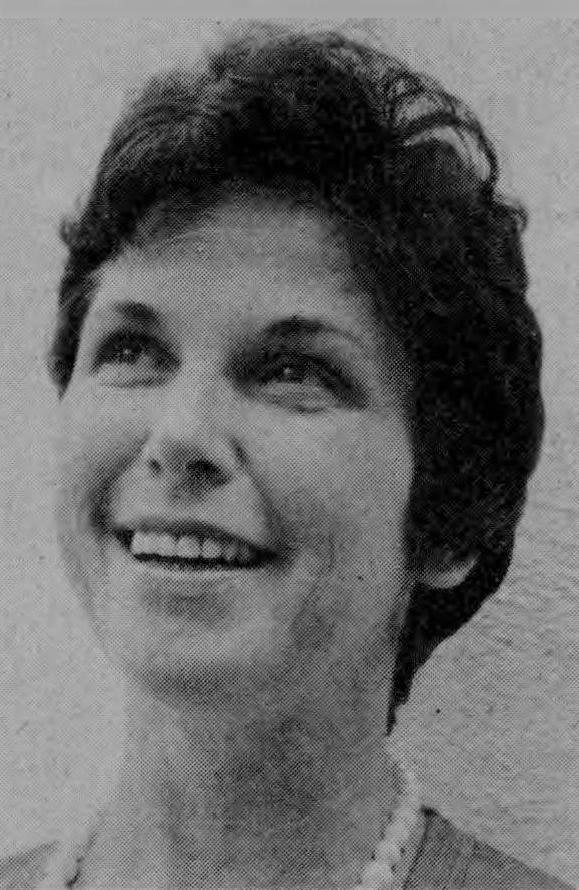

Chair of New York State Right to Life Party

Personal details
- Born: Eleanor Rose Cullen; September 15, 1926 The Bronx, New York, U.S.
- Died: March 27, 2011 (aged 84) Avon, Connecticut, U.S.
- Party: Right to Life
- Other political affiliations: Democratic
- Spouse: Francis J. McCormack (m. 1949; died 1993)
- Children: 4

Ellen Cullen McCormack (September 15, 1926 – March 27, 2011) was an American politician who was a candidate for the Democratic presidential nomination in 1976.

== Early life ==
On September 15, 1926, Eleanor Rose Cullen was born in The Bronx borough of New York City, to Irish immigrants William and Ellen Cullen. In 1949, she married Francis J. McCormack, after meeting him at a dance, and had four children with him.

== Career ==
On July 14, 1975, McCormack filed with the Federal Election Commission to run in the 1976 presidential primary, and formally announced her candidacy at a news conference in Boston, Massachusetts, on November 16. She was the first woman to receive federal matching funds (she received $244,125), and appeared on the ballot in twenty states. She ran on an exclusively anti-abortion platform, and won no primaries, but had her name placed into nomination and seconded by Erma Clardy Craven and received 22 votes from delegates at the 1976 Democratic National Convention, and engaged in a debate that also included future President Jimmy Carter.

During the 1980 presidential election, she ran as the presidential nominee of the New York State Right to Life Party, with Carroll Driscoll as her running mate. They received 32,327 votes.

She had been a chairwoman of the New York Right to Life Party, and was their candidate for Lieutenant Governor of New York in 1978.

== Later life ==
On March 27, 2011, she died in an assisted-living facility in Avon, Connecticut, after a long period with a heart ailment which originated during one of her pregnancies.
