= 1976 Democratic National Convention =

Political convention

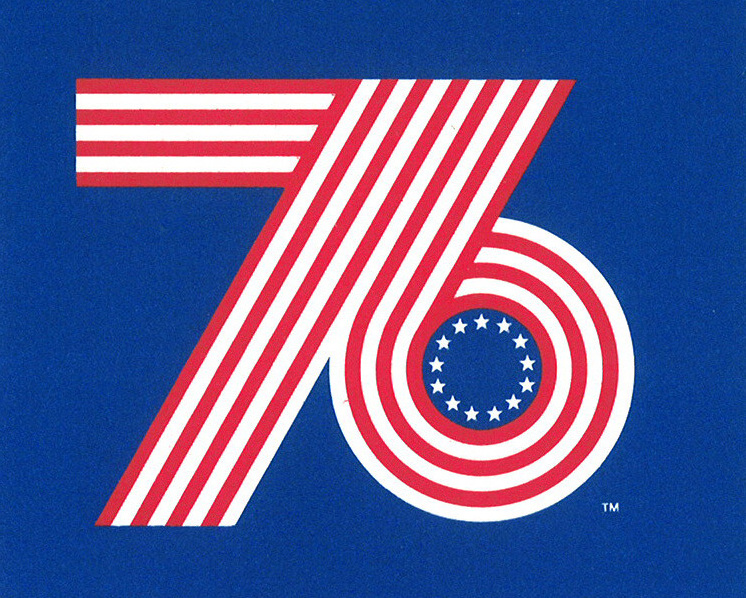
- 1976 presidential election

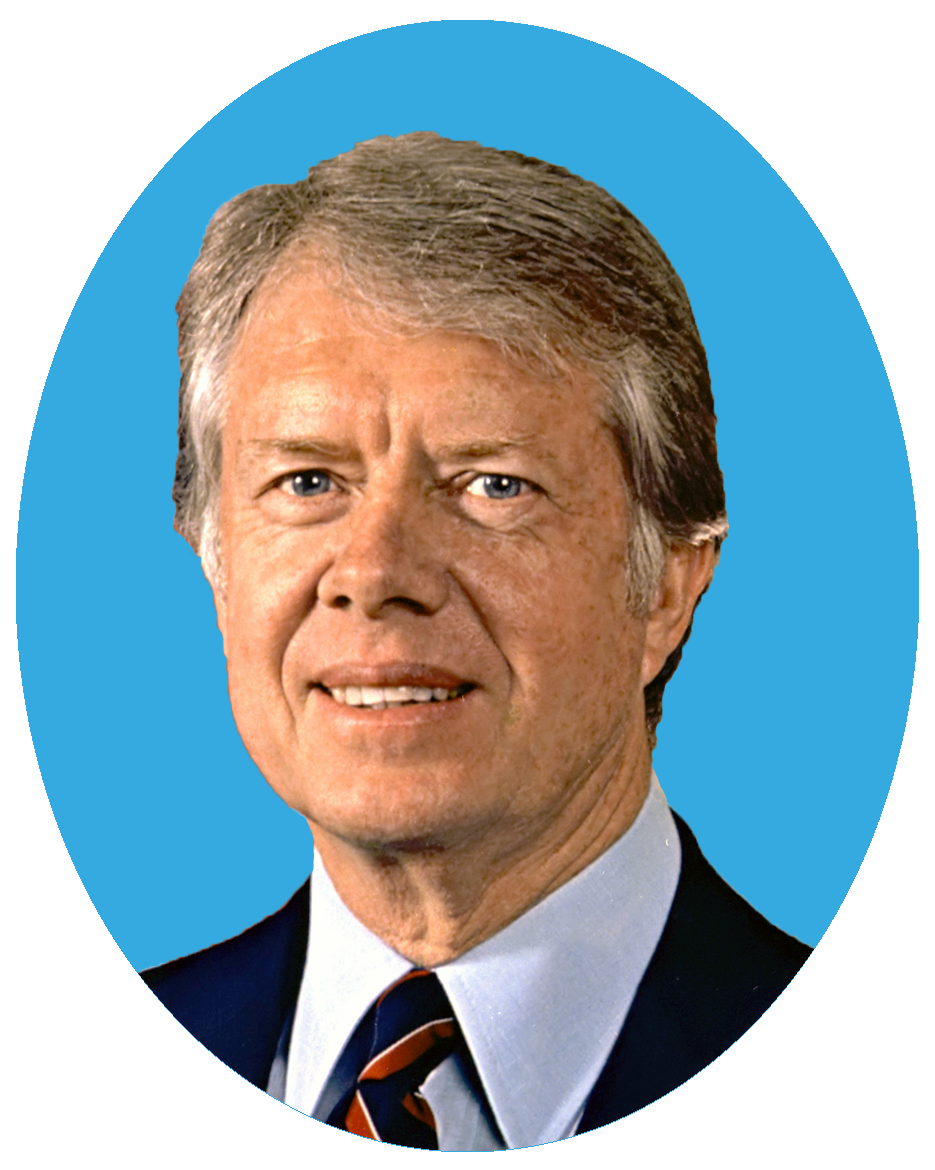
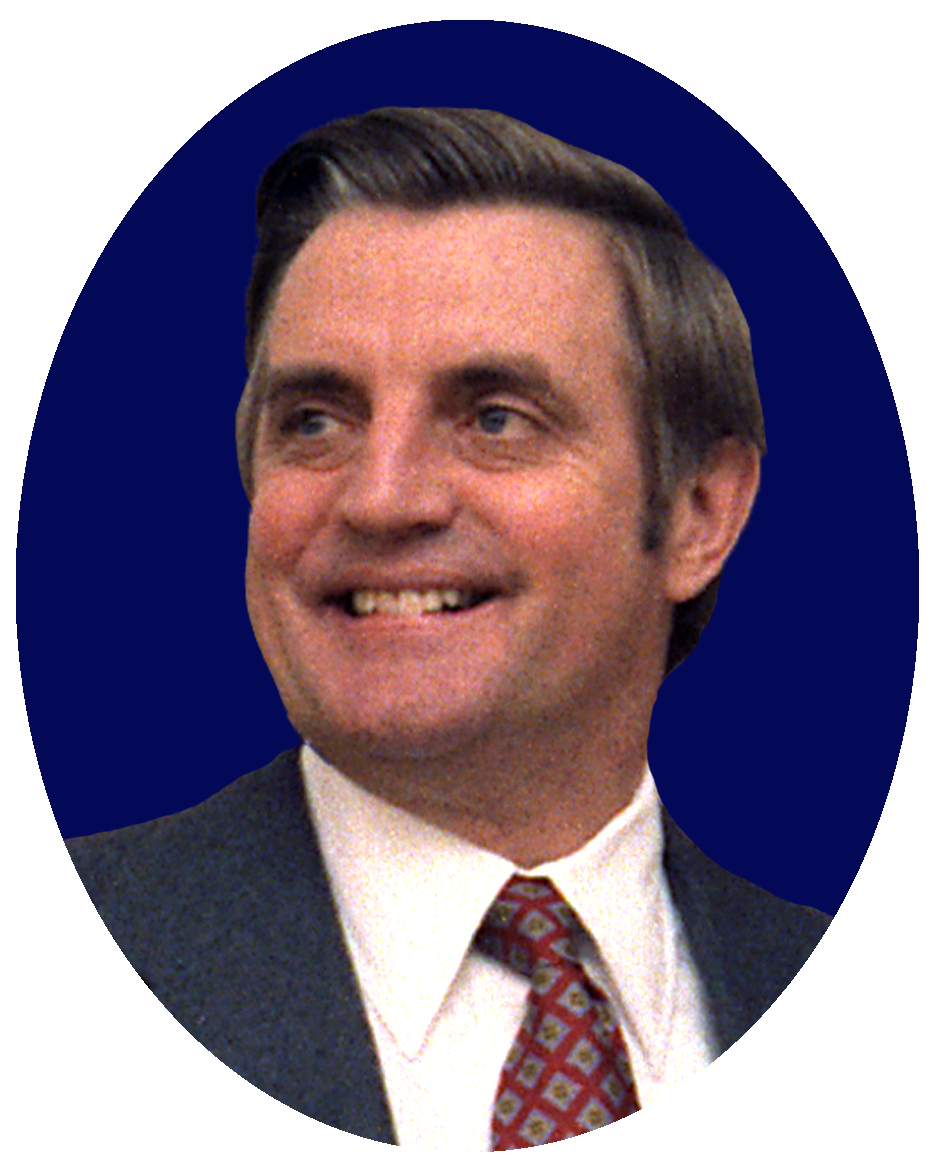
- Nominees; Carter and Mondale

Convention
- Dates: July 12–15, 1976
- City: New York, New York
- Venue: Madison Square Garden
- Keynote speaker: Barbara Jordan

Candidates
- Presidential nominee: Jimmy Carter of Georgia
- Vice-presidential nominee: Walter Mondale of Minnesota

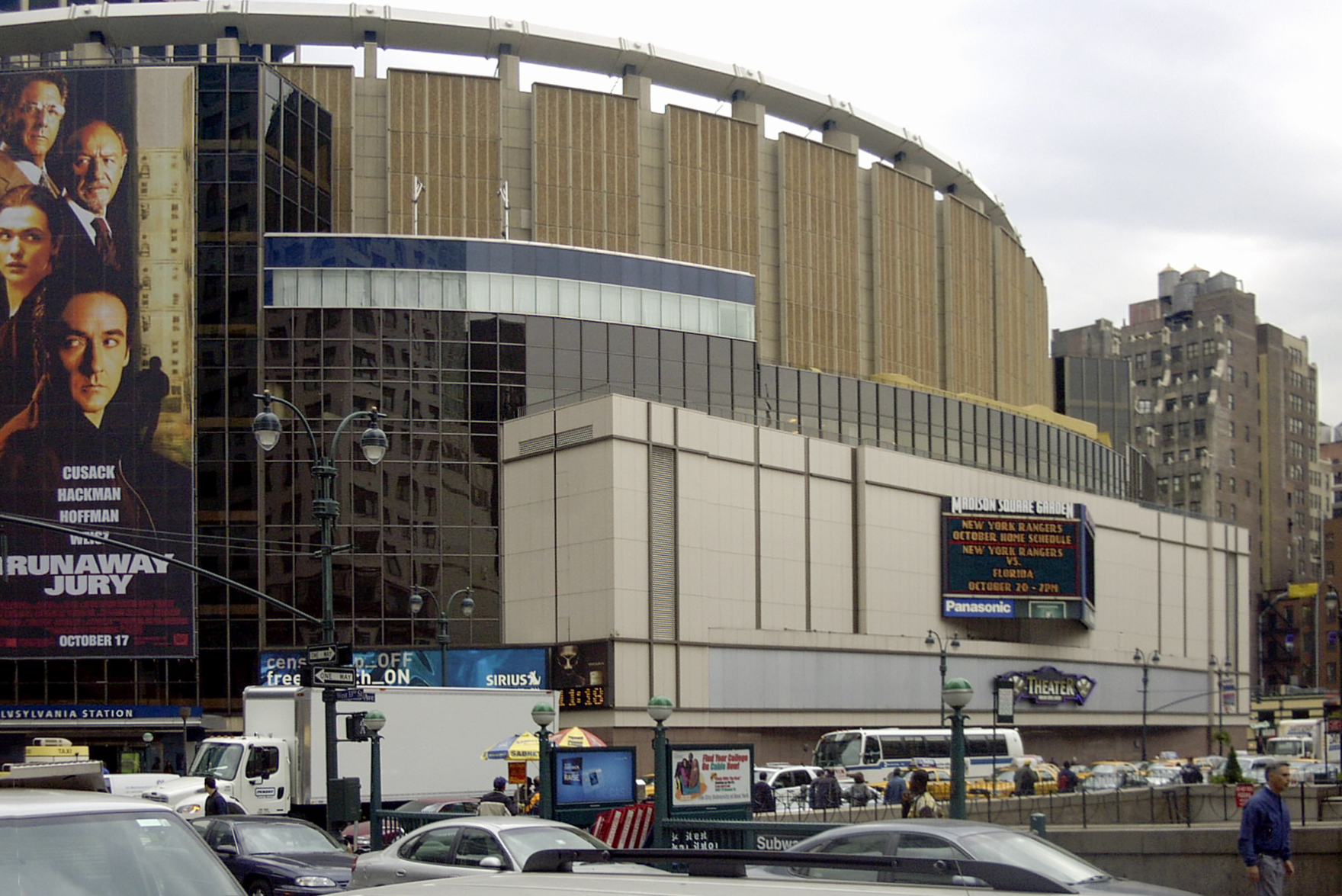
Madison Square Garden was the site of the 1976 Democratic National Convention

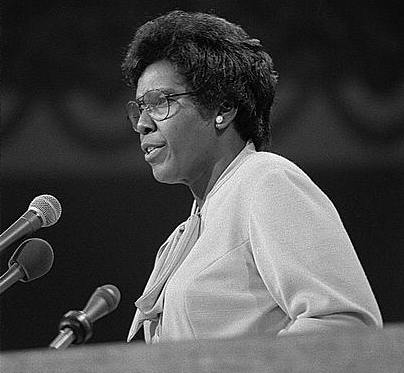
Barbara Jordan delivering the keynote address on the first day of the convention

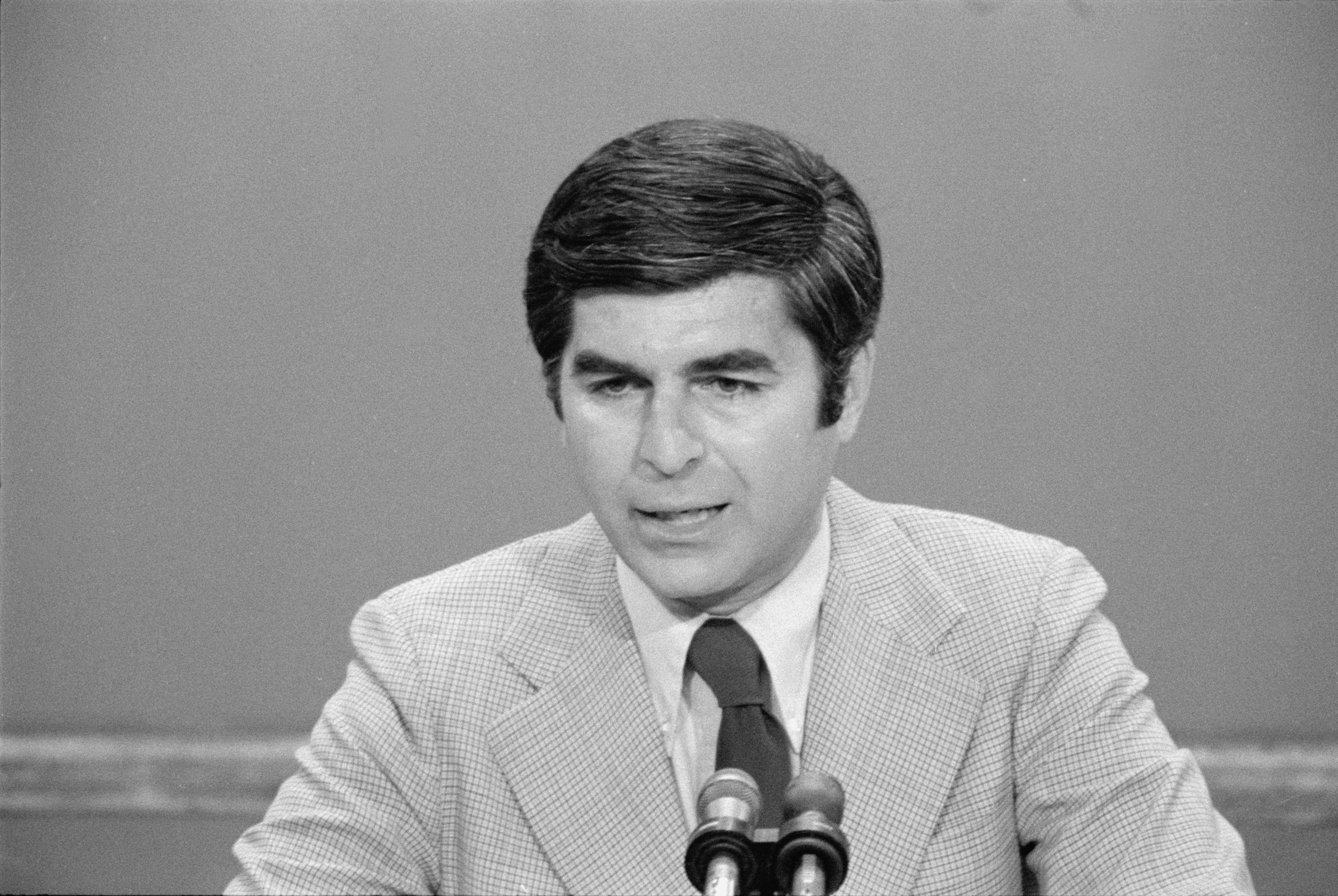
Michael Dukakis speaks on the second day of the convention

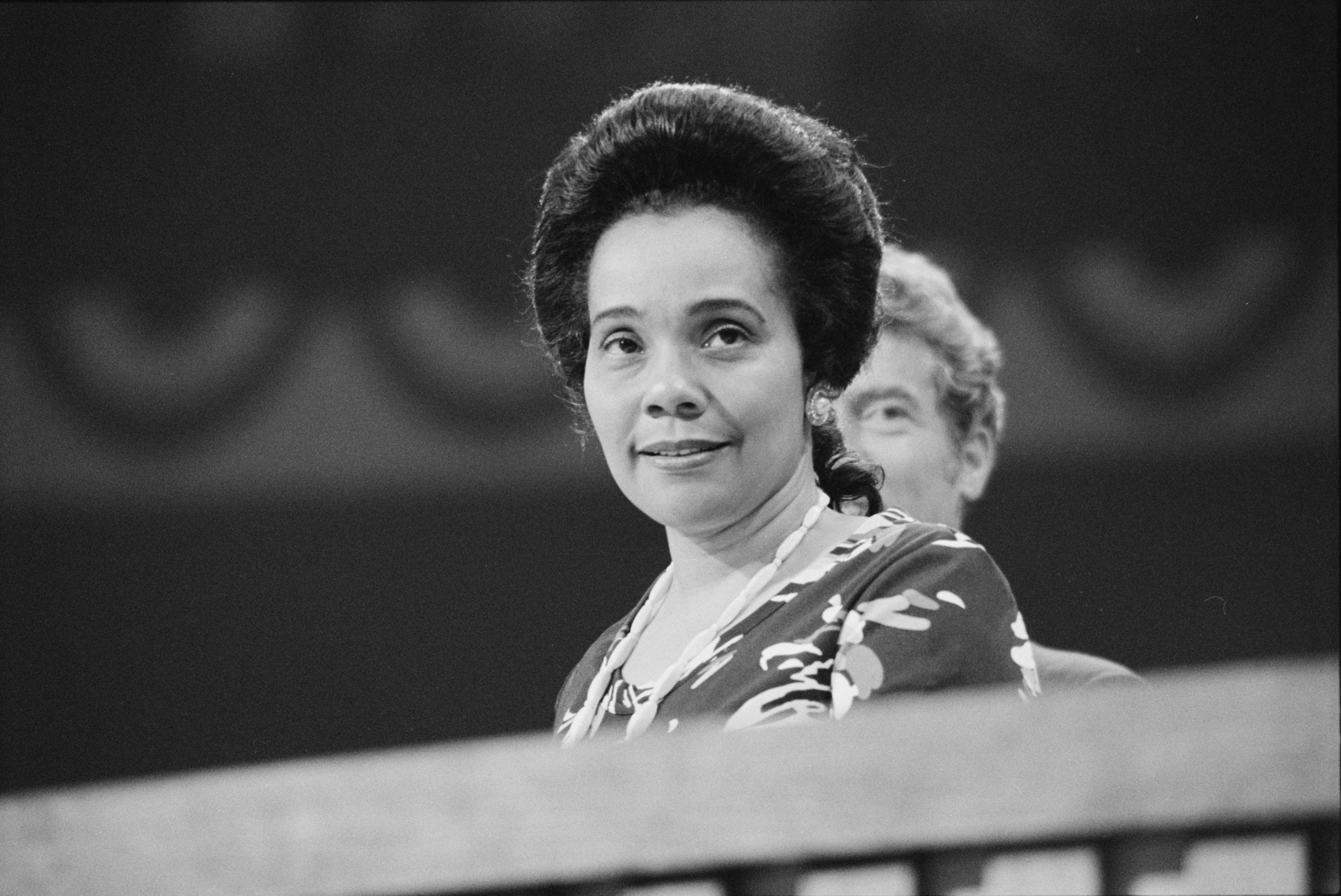
Coretta Scott King (the widow of Martin Luther King Jr.) attending the second day of the convention

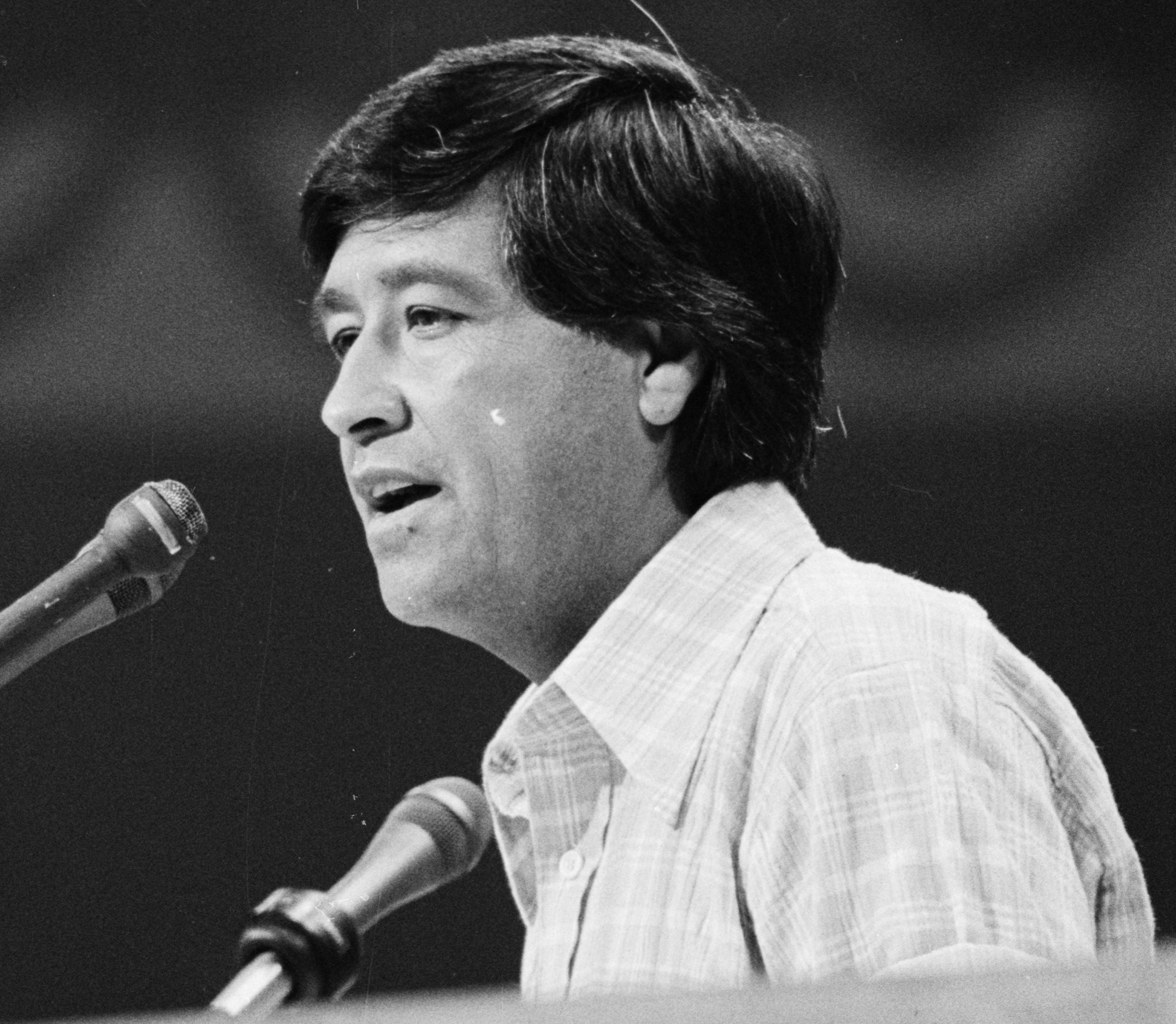
Cesar Chavez nominating Jerry Brown during the presidential roll call vote on the third-day of the convention

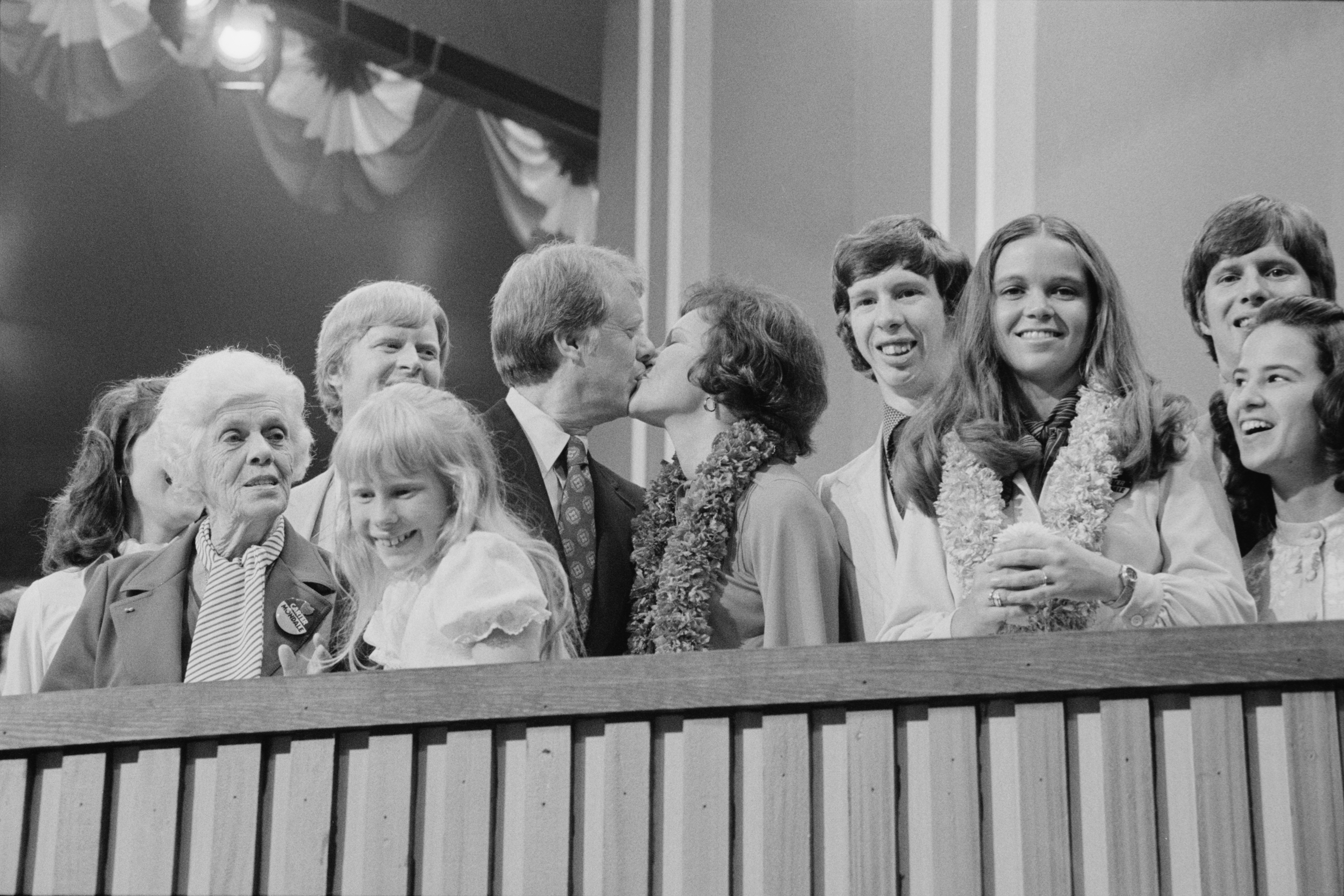
Carter kisses his wife Rosalynn on the final day of the convention, with members of their family surrounding them

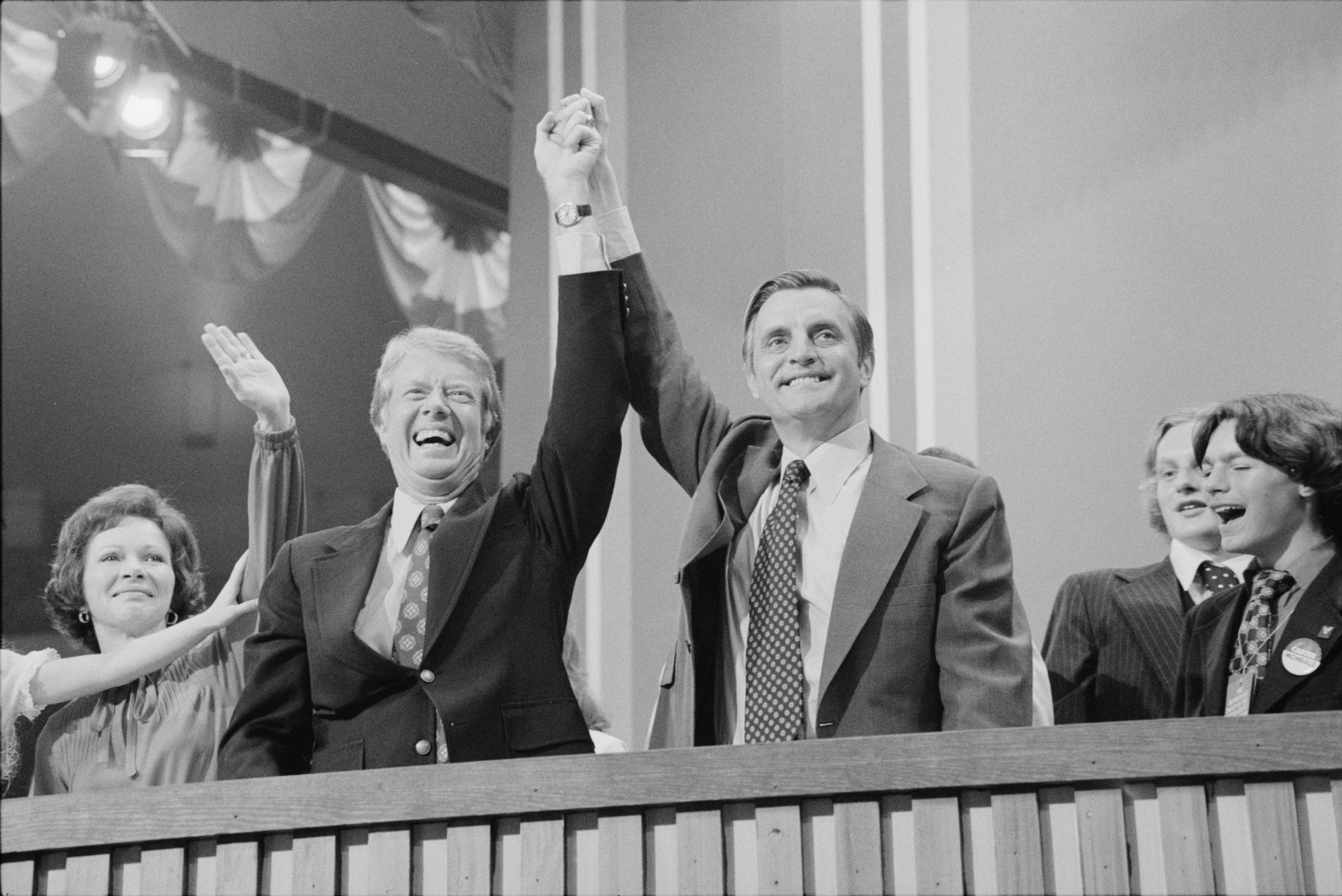
Carter and Mondale stand alongside their wives on the final day of the convention

The 1976 Democratic National Convention met at Madison Square Garden in New York City, from July 12 to July 15, 1976. The assembled United States Democratic Party delegates at the convention nominated former Governor Jimmy Carter of Georgia for president and Senator Walter Mondale of Minnesota for vice president. John Glenn and Barbara Jordan gave the keynote addresses. Jordan's keynote address made her the first African-American woman to deliver the keynote address at a Democratic National Convention. The convention was the first in New York City since the 103-ballot 1924 convention.

By the time the convention opened Carter already had won more than enough delegates in the primary elections and caucuses to clinch the nomination, and so the major emphasis at the convention was to create an appearance of party unity, which had been lacking in the 1968 and 1972 Democratic Conventions. Carter easily won the nomination on the first ballot. He then chose Mondale, a liberal and a protégé of Hubert Humphrey, as his running mate. Mondale was put over the top at roll call by the convention's second youngest delegate Cathy Clardy who cast the delegate votes for the State of Minnesota.

The Carter–Mondale ticket went on to win the 1976 presidential election on November 2.

The convention is also notable for the fact that congresswoman Lindy Boggs, who presided over it, thus became the first woman to preside over a national political convention.

== Platform ==
The Democrats' 1976 platform called for continued price controls on natural gas, a policy which had caused dwindling domestic natural gas reserves since 1974 and which President Gerald Ford was asking to rescind. The platform stated: "Those now pressing to turn natural-gas price regulation over to OPEC, while arguing the rhetoric of so-called deregulation, must not prevail."

=== Abortion ===
Despite an address from anti-abortion activist Erma Clardy Craven, the platform added "it is undesirable to attempt to amend the U.S. Constitution to overturn [Roe v. Wade]".

== Presidential vote tally ==
The following people had their names placed in nomination.

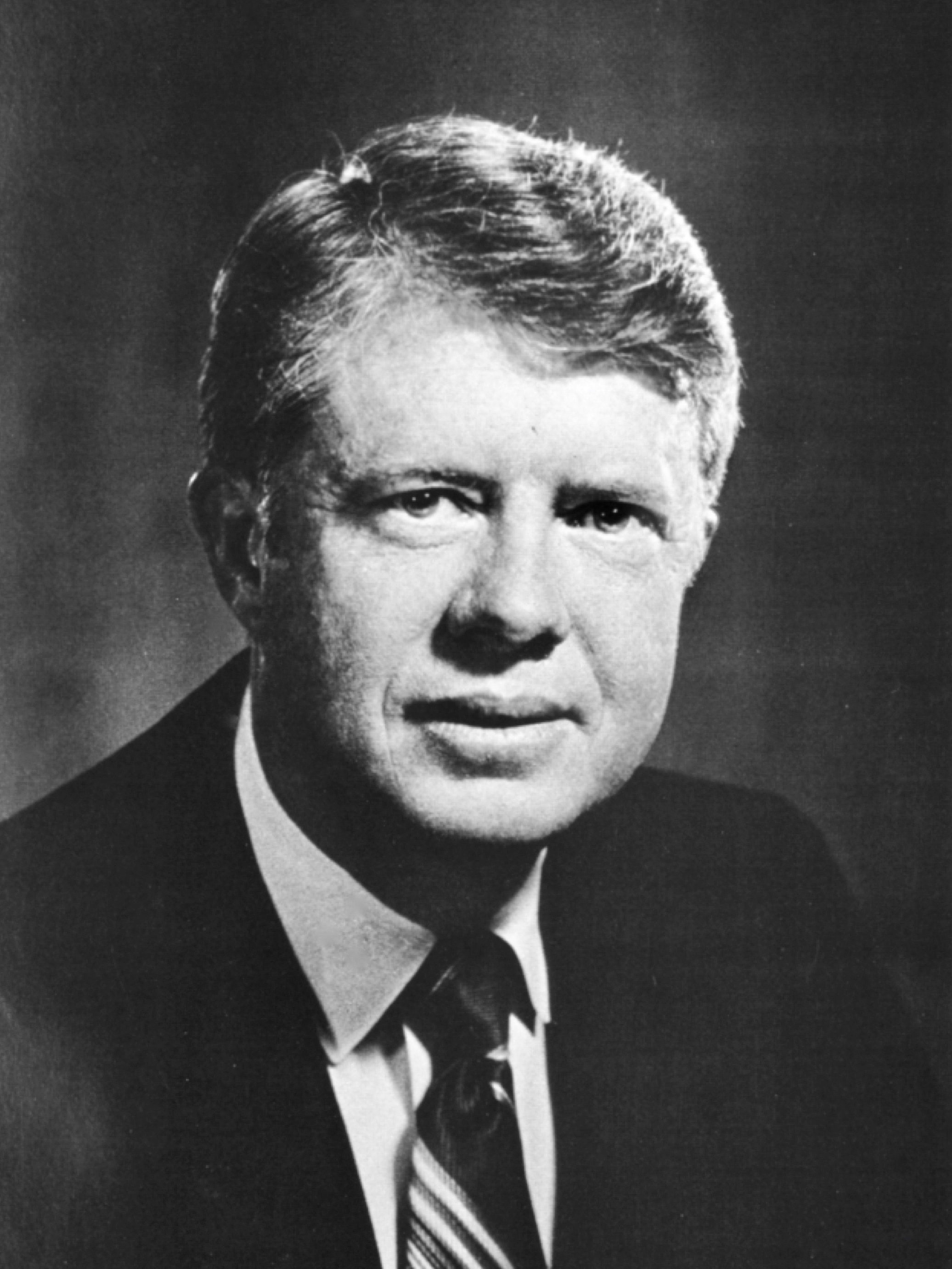
Former Governor
Jimmy Carter
of Georgia

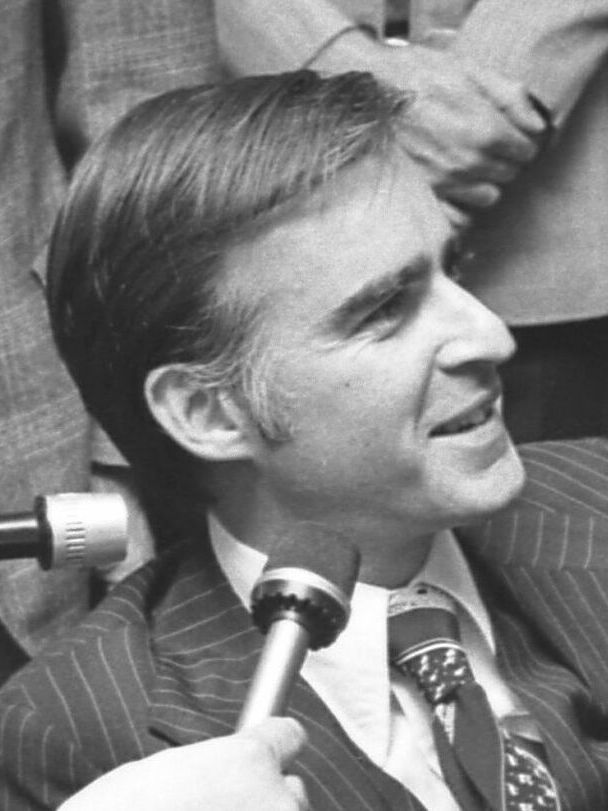
Governor
Jerry Brown
of California

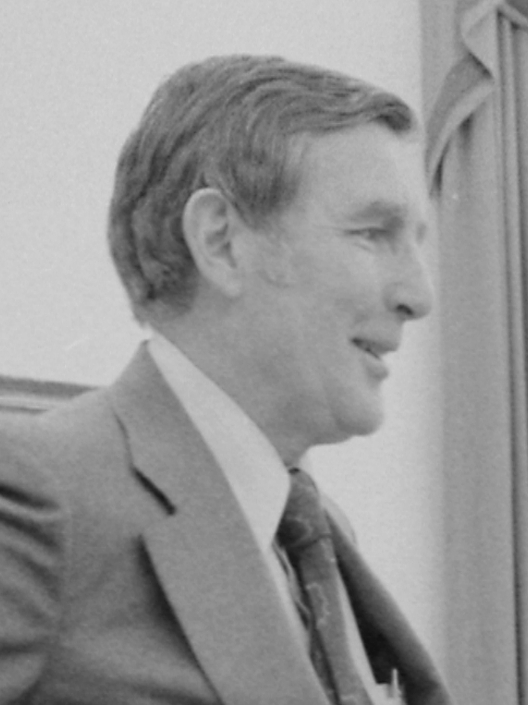
Representative
Morris Udall
from Arizona

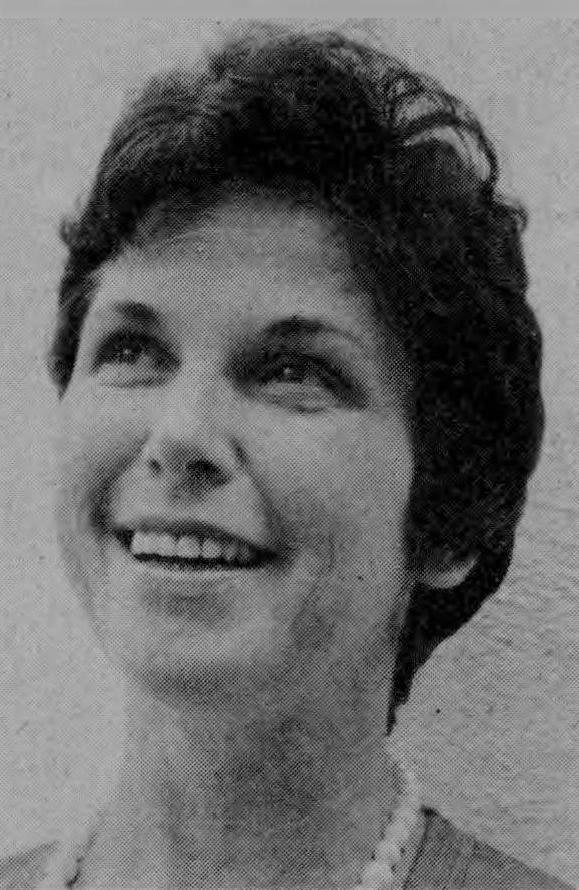
Activist
Ellen McCormack
of New York

The tally at the convention was:

Democratic National Convention Presidential nominee vote, 1976
Candidate	Votes	Percentage
Jimmy Carter	2,238.5	74.42%
Mo Udall	329.5	10.95%
Jerry Brown	300.5	9.99%
George Wallace	57.0	1.89%
Ellen McCormack	22.0	0.73%
Frank Church	19.0	0.63%
Hubert Humphrey	10.0	0.33%
Henry M. Jackson	10.0	0.33%
Fred R. Harris	9.0	0.30%
Milton Shapp	2.0	0.07%
Robert Byrd	2.0	0.07%
César Chávez, Leon Jaworski, Barbara Jordan, Ted Kennedy, Jennings Randolph and Fred W. Stover	1 vote each	0.03% each
"nobody"	0.5	0.02%
Abstention	3.0	0.10%
Totals	3,008	100.00%

== Vice presidential nomination ==
According to Jimmy Carter, his top choices for vice president were: Walter Mondale, Edmund Muskie, Frank Church, Adlai Stevenson III, John Glenn, and Henry M. Jackson. He selected Mondale.

The vice presidential tally was:

- Walter Mondale, 2,817 (94.28%)
- Carl Albert, 36 (1.21%)
- Barbara Jordan, 25 (0.84%)
- Ron Dellums, 20 (0.67%)
- Henry M. Jackson, 16 (0.54%)
- Gary Benoit, 12 (0.40%)
- Frank Church, 11 (0.37%)
- Fritz Efaw, 11 (0.37%)
- Peter F. Flaherty, 11 (0.37%)
- George Wallace, 6 (0.20%)
- Allard K. Lowenstein, 5 (0.17%)
- Edmund Muskie, 4 (0.13%)
- Philip Hart, 2 (0.07%)
- Thomas E. Morgan, 2 (0.07%)
- Mo Udall, 2 (0.07%)
- Al Castro, 1 (0.03%)
- Fred R. Harris, 1 (0.03%)
- Ernest Hollings, 1 (0.03%)
- Peter W. Rodino, 1 (0.03%)
- Josephine E. R. A. Smith, 1 (0.03%)
- Daniel Schorr, 1 (0.03%)
- Hunter S. Thompson, 1 (0.03%)
- Wendell Anderson, 1 (0.03%)

In his acceptance speech, Mondale diverted from his printed text which echoed John F. Kennedy's call to "get the country moving again;" Mondale instead said, "Let's get this government moving again!"

== See also ==
- 1976 Republican National Convention
- 1976 United States presidential election
- History of the United States Democratic Party
- List of Democratic National Conventions
- United States presidential nominating convention
- 1976 Democratic Party presidential primaries

Preceded by 1972; Miami Beach, Florida	Democratic National Conventions	Succeeded by 1980; New York, New York
