= James Bopp =

American lawyer (born 1948)

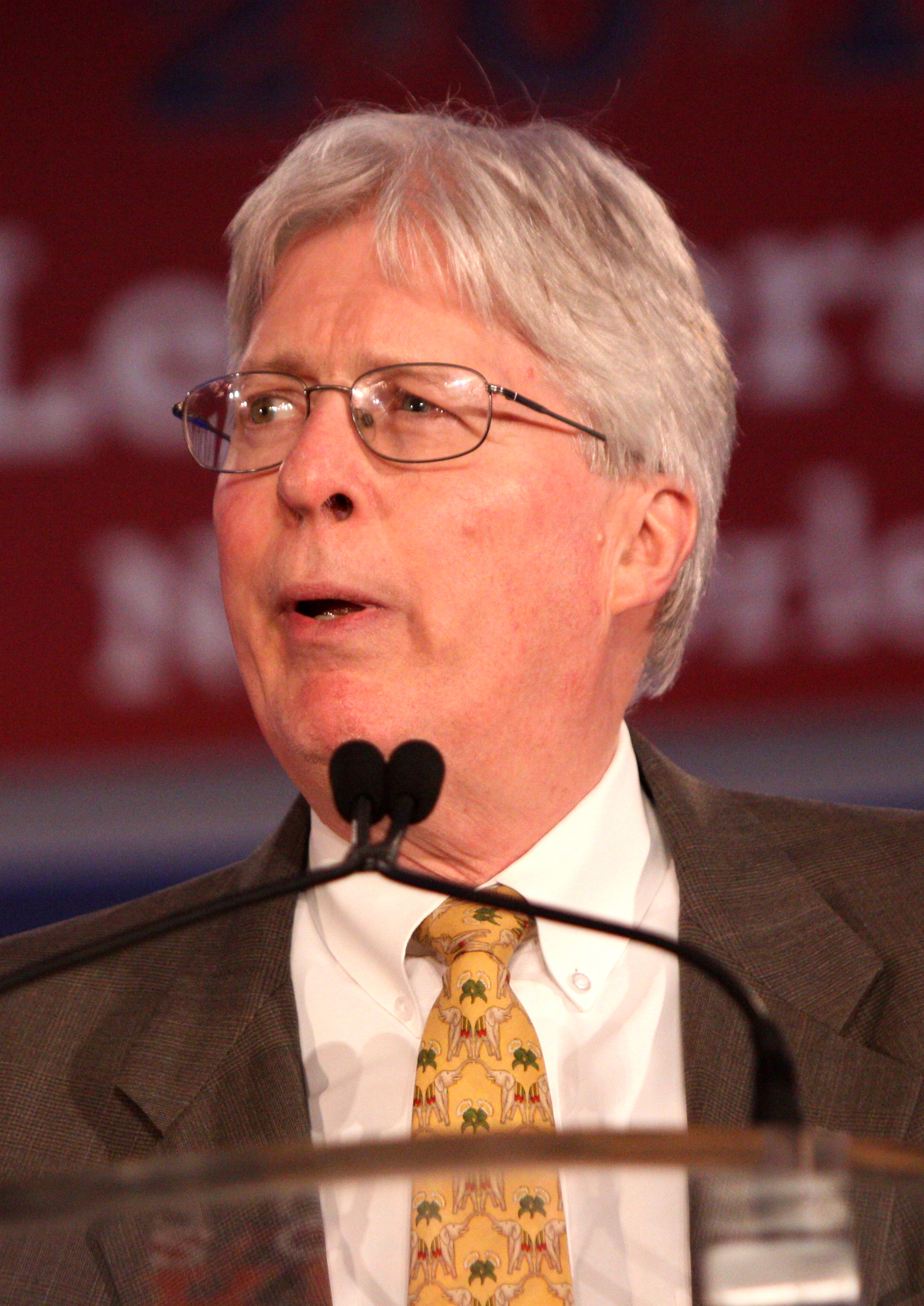
- Born: February 8, 1948 (age 78); Terre Haute, Indiana, U.S.
- Education: Indiana University Bloomington (BA); University of Florida (JD)
- Political party: Republican
- Website: Official website

James Bopp Jr. (born February 8, 1948) is an American conservative lawyer. He is most known for his work associated with election laws, anti-abortion model legislation, and campaign finance.

Bopp served as deputy attorney general of Indiana from 1973 to 1975. He later served as Indiana's committeeman on the Republican National Committee (RNC), and was the RNC's vice chairman from 2008 to 2012.

== Early life ==
Bopp is a native of Terre Haute, Indiana, and holds a bachelor's degree from Indiana University Bloomington and a J.D. degree from the University of Florida College of Law.

== Career as lawyer and Republican Party activist ==
Bopp is known for his staunch social conservatism, and his past and present clients are "a who's who of social conservatism," including the Traditional Values Coalition, the Home School Legal Defense Association, Concerned Women for America, and the Federation for American Immigration Reform. He has been the general counsel for National Right to Life since 1978, the James Madison Center for Free Speech since 1997, and as the special counsel for Focus on the Family since 2004. Bopp was the editor of Restoring the Right to Life: The Human Life Amendment, a book promoting the Human Life Amendment to the U.S. Constitution to overturn Roe v. Wade and ban abortion.

A study conducted in 2014 showed that Bopp was one of a comparatively small number of lawyers most likely to have their cases heard by the Supreme Court. He has repeatedly been named one of the 100 most influential lawyers in the United States by the National Law Journal,

=== Activities in Republican organizations ===
He became Indiana's Republican National Committeeman on the Republican National Committee in 2006, and became the RNC's vice chairman in 2008. His tenure on the RNC ended in 2012 when he was defeated for another term by John Hammond at the state Republican convention. Bopp said after the convention that he was defeated because he supported Richard Mourdock over incumbent Richard Lugar for the Republican nomination for U.S. Senate in 2012.

In 2009, Bopp was the lead sponsor of an RNC resolution that initially called on the Democratic Party to change its name to Democratic Socialist Party. A compromise resolution was passed instead, condemning President Barack Obama and the then-Democratic congressional majority for "pushing America toward socialism and more government control."

During a 2010 RNC meeting, he was the chief sponsor of a resolution covering financial support of candidates. The "purity test" resolution (titled "Proposed RNC Resolution on Reagan's Unity Principle for Support of Candidates") names ten public policy positions that are important to the RNC and stipulated that public officials and candidates who disagree on three or more of the ten positions would be ineligible for financial support or endorsement from the RNC. The resolution was defeated.

Bopp clashed with Michael Steele during Steele's term as chairman of the Republican National Committee; after Bopp criticized Steele, Steele called Bopp an "idiot."

During the 2012 Republican presidential primaries, Bopp initially stayed neutral in the race because he was part of a committee charged with setting the number of Republican primary debates. However, three attorneys in Bopp's office left to work for Herman Cain. In February 2012, Bopp endorsed Mitt Romney.

=== Activism against same-sex marriage and LGBT rights ===
Bopp has repeatedly represented Indiana on the Republican Party's platform committee, including in 2016. On the committee, Bopp pushed for a socially conservative platform, advocating platform language stating that children "deserve a married mom and dad" and referring to "natural marriage" as between a man and a woman. Bopp opposed efforts by billionaire Republican Paul E. Singer to add a statement to the party platform committing the party "to respect for all families," a signal of openness to LGBT Americans; Bopp called the proposed language "redundant and superfluous." Bopp also opposed efforts by delegate Rachel Hoff (the first openly gay member of a Republican platform committee) to include a reference in the platform to the 2016 attack on a gay nightclub in Orlando; Bopp stated that including such language (which was ultimately voted down) would be "identity politics."

Bopp opposed an effort by some delegates to replace the 60-page platform that the committee had adopted with a simplified two-page "statement of principles" that excluded any mention of contentious issues, such as same-sex marriage. Bopp wrote in opposition to the alternative proposal that: "Obviously, the adoption of this statement of principles would be a major defeat for those of us that want the Republican Party to promote traditional marriage since the minority report wipes out our current platform language that supports traditional marriage."

In ProtectMarriage.com v. Bowen, Bopp represented ProtectMarriage.com in a suit challenging the finance limit required for reporting campaign donations and the open way in which information on such donations is shared in California. This lawsuit was filed after the identities of people supporting California Proposition 8 were revealed as a result of disclosure laws.

=== Attempts to overturn 2020 presidential election results ===
In the November 2020 election, President Donald Trump was defeated by Democratic candidate Joe Biden. Trump refused to concede the election and made false claims that the election was "stolen" from him; Bopp supported Trump's false claims. Bopp filed four lawsuits challenging the election results in four swing states won by Biden—Pennsylvania, Michigan, Georgia and Wisconsin. Bopp's lawsuit, brought on behalf of a handful of voters in each of the four states, sought to throw out more than 6.3 million votes across 18 counties and therefore make Trump the winner of those states, and thus the election. One week after filing the lawsuits, Bopp abruptly withdrew the suits. He declined to explain why.

Bopp also represented True the Vote, a right-wing advocacy group that promotes false allegations of election fraud, in several failed lawsuits that questioned the presidential election outcome in Georgia, Michigan, Pennsylvania and Wisconsin. The lawsuits produced no evidence of significant fraud or irregularities. True the Vote claimed to be investigating the 2020 election and aimed to raise more than $7 million for donors. Fred Eshelman, a Trump-supporting businessman and political donor, contributed $2 million to the group, but later sued after it became clear that there was no evidence to support the group's conspiracy-laden claims. Documents subsequently revealed in Eshelman's litigation showed that Bopp and True the Vote coordinated with Trump allies, such as Trump's personal attorneys Rudolph W. Giuliani and Jay Sekulow, as well as Senator Lindsey Graham and Oracle Corporation founder Larry Ellison.

=== Representation of Republicans in unsuccessful lawsuits claiming voter fraud ===
During the 2020 election, Bopp represented Republicans in lawsuits over voting rights. Bopp claimed, without evidence, that proactively mailing ballots to registered voters would lead to voter fraud.

=== Anti-vaccination lawsuit ===
In 2021, Bopp was the lead counsel for a group of eight Indiana University students who sued the university over its requirement that all students and employees to be vaccinated against COVID-19, except students and employees who had a religious or medical reason not to be vaccinated. America's Frontline Doctors, a right-wing anti-vaccination group, financed the litigation. The federal district court rejected the group's request for an injunction, and the U.S. Court of Appeals for the Seventh Circuit and Supreme Court rejected the plaintiffs' motion for an injunction pending appeal.

=== Campaign finance and election-law suits ===
Bopp is particularly known for his opposition to all forms of limits on money in politics and his role as counsel for groups seeking to strike down campaign-finance limitations. Bopp describing himself as launching a "ten-year plan" to invalidate campaign finance regulations.

In McCutcheon v. Federal Election Commission, Bopp successfully represented McCutcheon. The Supreme Court struck down section 441 of the Federal Election Campaign Act, which imposed a limit on contributions an individual could make over a two-year period to national party and federal candidate committees, is unconstitutional.

In 2011 in Susan B. Anthony List v. Driehaus, Bopp successfully defended the Susan B. Anthony List against a defamation lawsuit by Steve Driehaus, a former Democratic congressman who claimed that the SBA List had made false statements regarding taxpayer funding of abortion in the Patient Protection and Affordable Care Act. The court ruled "We do not want the government deciding what is political truth — for fear that the government might persecute those who criticize it. Instead, in a democracy, the voters should decide."

In Citizens United v. Federal Election Commission, Bopp represented Citizens United, drafting the complaint and handling the early stages of the litigation. Bopp did not argue the case in the Supreme Court in 2009, having been replaced by Ted Olson. Bopp previously represented parties challenging provisions of the Bipartisan Campaign Reform Act of 2002 in other cases, including Christian Civic League of Maine v. Federal Election Commission. In Leake v. North Carolina Right to Life, Inc., Bopp also represented the challengers to a North Carolina campaign-finance regulations.

In Wisconsin Judicial Commission v. Gableman (2010), Bopp successfully represented Wisconsin Supreme Court Justice Michael Gableman in a case alleging he broke the Wisconsin Judicial Code of Conduct during his successful run for the state supreme court. The Wisconsin Supreme Court deadlocked, 3–3, on the case.

In Kurita v. Tennessee Democratic Party (2008), Bopp represented former State Senator Rosalind Kurita, a Democrat, in her suit against the Tennessee Democratic Party for removing her as the Democratic nominee in her State Senate district after she had won the primary.

In Western Tradition Partnership, Inc. v. Montana (2012), Bopp represented party challenging Montana's ban on corporate independent expenditures. In Doe v. Reed (2010), Bopp delivered oral argument to the U.S. Supreme Court, arguing that Washington state's disclosure of signatures on a ballot initiative petition violate the First Amendment; the Court rejected this argument. In Randall v. Sorrell (2006), Bopp argued before the Supreme Court on behalf of Vermont Right-to-Life Committee, Vermont Republican Party, and American Civil Liberties Union in a successful challenge to Vermont's stringent spending and contribution limits. In Federal Election Commission v. Beaumont (2003), Bopp represented North Carolina Right to Life, Inc., and others in the U.S. Supreme Court, unsuccessfully arguing that a direct contribution prohibition to nonprofit advocacy corporations violated the First Amendment.

In Republican Party of Minnesota v. White (2002), Bopp argued on behalf of the challengers to a Minnesota rule of judicial conduct barring candidates for judicial office from expressing their views on disputed legal and political issues; the U.S. Supreme Court agreed, 5–4, that the rule was unconstitutional. In McConnell v. FEC (2004), Bopp represented the challengers in a suit challenging the constitutionality of the Bipartisan Campaign Reform Act (BCRA) of 2002 (McCain-Feingold); the challenge was largely unsuccessful, as the court upheld most BCRA provisions as constitutional, but the Supreme Court subsequently gutted one of the two key provisions of McCain-Feingold a few years later in FEC v. Wisconsin Right to Life, Inc. (2006–07), in which Bopp also represented the challengers.

=== FATCA challenge ===
Bopp represented a group of plaintiffs, including Senator Rand Paul (R-KY), Republicans Overseas, and current and former U.S. citizens living in foreign countries, in a legal challenge to the Foreign Account Tax Compliance Act (FATCA) filed in 2015. The plaintiffs in the lawsuit, Crawford v. U.S. Department of Treasury, alleged that a number of provisions of the act unconstitutionally violate privacy rights of U.S. citizens, while burdening both private individuals and the financial institutions that they patronize. The federal district court dismissed the suit for lack of standing, and U.S. Court of Appeals for the Sixth Circuit upheld the dismissal.

=== 14th Amendment lawsuits ===
Bopp represented Representatives Marjorie Taylor Greene and Madison Cawthorn in separate lawsuits that attempted to disqualify them from office on the basis of the Fourteenth Amendment to the United States Constitution.

=== National Right to Life Committee ===
In 2022, responding to reports that a 10-year-old rape victim travelled from Ohio to Indiana to receive an abortion, Bopp said that model legislation he developed for the National Right to Life Committee would have banned that abortion; he also said that they believed that the child should have been legally forced to carry the pregnancy to full term and give birth, and "we would hope that she would understand the reason and ultimately the benefit of having the child."
