= Dave's Room =

California recording studio

Coordinates: 34.22182°N 118.38777°W

Dave's Room, previously known as Mama Jo's Recording Studio, is a recording studio in North Hollywood, California.

== History ==
=== Mama Jo's (1969–2005) ===
Dave's Room was built in the late 1960s by producer and engineer Freddie Piro. Originally called Mama Jo's, the studio was the first independent recording studio in North Hollywood, California. Albums by artists such as Richie Furay, Keith Green, Billy Joel, Pat Benatar, Amy Grant, Sam Phillips, Ambrosia, Ziggy Marley, George Michael, Love Song, Michael W. Smith, Margaret Becker, BeBe and CeCe Winans, Andraé Crouch and the Disciples, Blink 182, Chuck Girard, The Way, Smokey Robinson, Randy Stonehill, Sweet Comfort Band and Daniel Amos were recorded there.

Producers and engineers including Alan Parsons, Jack Joseph Puig, Jonathan David Brown, Al Perkins, T Bone Burnett, Andy Johns, Brown Bannister, Burt Bacharach and Larry Norman were clients during this period.

=== Dave's Room (2006–present) ===
After falling into disrepair in the mid-2000s, in 2006 it was completely refurbished by David Bianco. Bianco restored the recording space with an eye toward maintaining the incredible period feel, and acoustics. The control room, originally designed by Vincent Van Haaff, was updated technically. The main speakers were re-built using matching components from another Van Haaff-designed room at Larrabee Sound Studios, and was re-named Dave's Room.

Albums by Lucinda Williams, Blues Traveler, Bob Dylan, Big Head Todd and the Monsters, Trombone Shorty, Exene Cervenka, Meghan Trainor, Bettye LaVette, Tift Merritt, Susan Tedeschi, Travis, Marilyn Manson, Robert Randolph, Paul Stanley and Judith Owen were recorded there, along with soundtrack music for The Muppets, Blades of Glory, Jonah Hex and Gangster Squad.

After Bianco's death, in June 2018 the studio was taken over by his longtime friends, and colleagues David Spreng and Paul "Fig" Figueroa with the support of the Bianco family.

== Selected albums recorded at Mama Jo's, Dave‘s Room ==
- Final Touch, Love Song, 1974
- Ambrosia, Ambrosia, 1975
- Can It Be?, The Way, 1975
- Take Me Back, Andraé Crouch and The Disciples, 1975
- Daniel Amos, Daniel Amos, 1976
- In Another Land, Larry Norman, 1976
- Welcome to Paradise, Randy Stonehill, 1976
- Tales of Mystery and Imagination, Alan Parsons, 1976
- Barefoot Ballet, John Klemmer, 1976
- View from the Bridge, Tom Howard, 1977
- Seasons of Change, Richie Furay, 1982
- A Call To Us All, Teri Desario, 1983
- Caught in the Act of Loving Him, Servant, 1983
- Beat the System, Petra, 1984
- Another Country, Tiff Merritt, 2008
- Jonah Hex, Mastodon, 2010
- Gangster Squad, soundtrack, 2013
- Psycho Killer, Harper Blynn, 2013
- Down Where the Spirit Meets The Bone, Lucinda Williams, 2014
- Get It Out, Harper Blynn, 2015
- The Ghosts of Highway 20, Lucinda Williams, 2016
- This Sweet Old World, Lucinda Williams, 2017
- We Are Chaos, Marilyn Manson, 2020
- Lamentations, American Aquarium, 2020
- Now And Then, Paul Stanley, 2021
- Why Not, Kenny Loggins, Jake Shimabukuro, 2021
- The Rose, Jake Shimabukuro, Bette Midler, 2021
- Physical Thrills, Silversun Pickups, 2022
- Floating on a Dream, Avi Kaplan, 2022
- A Cat in the Rain, Turnpike Troubadours, 2023
- Golden State, Logan Ledger, 2023
- Sirens, The Wild Feathers, 2024
- The Hardway Blues, Jesse Dayton, 2024
- L.A. Times, Travis, 2024
- If It Takes Forever, Brett Dennen, 2024
- " 'March To War' (album), Dexter Drive (band). 2025
