= The Silent Scream =

1984 film

- Original 1984 VHS cover
- Directed by: Jack Duane Dabner
- Written by: Donald S. Smith
- Produced by: Jack Duane Dabner, executive producer: Donald S. Smith
- Narrated by: Bernard N. Nathanson
- Cinematography: Roger Boller
- Edited by: Dan R. Fouts
- Music by: Jim Stipech
- Distributed by: American Portrait Films
- Release date: 1984
- Running time: 28 mins.
- Country: United States
- Language: English

The Silent Scream is a 1984 anti-abortion film created and narrated by Bernard Nathanson, a former abortion provider who had become an anti-abortion activist. It was produced by Crusade for Life, Inc., an evangelical anti-abortion organization, and has been described as a pro-life propaganda film. The film depicts the abortion process via ultrasound and shows an abortion taking place in the uterus. During the abortion process, the fetus is described as appearing to make outcries of pain and discomfort. The video has been a popular tool used by the anti-abortion campaign in arguing against abortion, but it has been criticized as misleading by members of the medical community.

== Development ==
Nathanson credits then-president Ronald Reagan for inspiring him to make The Silent Scream. In a speech to the Association of National Religious Broadcasters in January 1984, Reagan stated that a fetus suffers "long and agonizing pain" during an abortion. The American College of Obstetricians and Gynecologists issued a statement in response to the president's comment, saying that the neurological pathways necessary to experience pain do not begin to develop until the third trimester of pregnancy. Nathanson agreed with the president and issued a counterstatement. When critics continued to dispute that a fetus feels pain during the first two trimesters of pregnancy, Nathanson decided to make a movie, saying "I mulled it over and thought there's only one way we can resolve this issue, and that's by photographing an abortion, beginning to end."

== Overview ==
The entire film

Nathanson, an anti-abortion (formerly pro-abortion rights) obstetrician, serves as both the medical expert and narrator of the film, describing the events of the abortion as they unfold. He begins by stating the viewer is about to witness the "dazzling" new "science of fetology" and to witness an abortion in real time "from the victim's vantage point." The film compiled a series of still ultrasound images of the abortion of a twelve-week-old fetus (referred to as a child by Nathanson) spliced together to create the video.

Nathanson displays the instruments used in a typical abortion and calmly demonstrates how each instrument is introduced into a woman's body during an abortion. Nathanson states that the head, even at 12 weeks' gestation, will be too large to enter the suction device and shows how forceps are used to crush the skull. He suggests that brain waves have been active for six weeks, though this is disputed by scientists.

A television screen shows ultrasound images of a fetus. As the images of an abortion appear on the screen, Nathanson describes step-by-step what is taking place, pointing out new instruments that are introduced into the uterus. The suction cannula is described as a lethal weapon that will "dismember, crush, and destroy" the child. He narrates that the fetus is unprepared for the invasion of the womb and attempts to escape the cannula, describing it as a "child being torn apart [...] by the unfeeling steel instruments of the abortionist." He notes how the fetus's heartbeat speeds up and how it seems to open its mouth in a "chilling silent scream."

The film concludes by discussing the implications behind hiding this material from women. Nathanson states that he believes the film is necessary in keeping women informed on matters concerning abortion. This was the first time the images of an aborted fetus were given an electronic platform, as opposed to the printed form of the imagery used in prior years.

== Reception ==
The Silent Scream was viewed by its producer and by the anti-abortion lobby as a tool capable of swaying public opinion against abortion. The film premiered on televangelist Jerry Falwell's program, and aired five times over the span of a month on major television networks. The film was later distributed widely to high schools and colleges and, according to Time magazine, "embraced as an effective propaganda weapon by right-to-life organizations." The film was popular among people who opposed abortion, even being shown at the White House by then-President Ronald Reagan. Reagan said that "if every member of Congress could see that film, they would move quickly to end the tragedy of abortion." The film's producers reportedly planned to send copies to every member of the United States Congress and to the Justice of the Supreme Court of the United States upon its release. Some opponents of abortion stated that the film gave a scientific basis to their position.

=== Medical community ===
Many members of the medical community were critical of the film, describing it as misleading and deceptive. Richard Berkowitz, professor of obstetrics and gynecology at Mount Sinai Medical Center, described the film as "factually misleading and unfair." John Hobbins of the Yale School of Medicine called the film's use of special effects deceptive, a form of "technical flimflam." He pointed out that the film of the ultrasound is initially run at slow speed, but that it is sped up when surgical instruments are introduced to give the impression that "the fetus is thrashing about in alarm." Hobbins questioned the titular "scream", noting that "the fetus spends lots of time with its mouth open," that the "scream" may have been a yawn, and also that "mouth" identified on the blurry ultrasound in the film may in fact have been the space between the fetal chin and chest. Edward Myer, chairman of pediatrics at the University of Virginia stated that, at twelve weeks, the brain is not sufficiently developed for a fetus to be able to feel pain. Similarly, Hart Peterson, chairman of pediatric neurology at the New York Hospital, stated that the "notion that a 12-week-old fetus is in discomfort is erroneous."

Fetal development experts argued that, contrary to Nathanson's assertion in the film, a fetus cannot perceive danger or make purposeful movements. David Bodian, a neurobiologist at Johns Hopkins School of Medicine, stated that doctors had no evidence that a twelve-week-old fetus could feel pain, but noted the possibility of a reflex movement by a fetus in response to external stimuli such as surgical instruments. The size of the ultrasound image and of the fetus model used was also misleading, appearing to show a fetus the size of a full-term baby, while in actuality a twelve-week-old fetus is under two inches long. Jennifer Niebyl of the Johns Hopkins School of Medicine said that what Nathanson described as the fetus recoiling from pain and seeking to escape is "strictly reflex activity" which Nathanson made look purposeful by speeding up the film as the suction catheter was placed. Fay Redwine of the VCU Medical Center stated: "Any of us could show you the same image in a fetus who is not being aborted."

=== Senate subcommittee hearing ===
Additional medical opinions on the film, some critical and some supportive, were presented before a U.S. Senate subcommittee that was examining the question of fetal pain. Among the opinions expressed were those of Dr. Richard Berkowitz, whose criticism of the film was already mentioned above, and Dr. Ian Donald, an English physician and pioneer of diagnostic ultrasound. Dr. Donald's affidavit said that the fetal activities shown in the film "are not faked nor the result of artefact intentional or otherwise." Nathanson himself appeared before the subcommittee and said that the film had portions that were shown in freeze frame or slow motion for clarification purposes but that it reverted to normal speed without any intention to deceive. On the issue of fetal pain, Nathanson said that the fetal reactions in the film imply that it is in pain, albeit at a "primitive level." He also conceded that at this stage of development there would be no cognition of pain in the cerebral cortex.

=== Pro-abortion rights community ===
Ron Fitzsimmons, of the National Abortion Rights Action League, stated that "it has forced us to respond." In 1985, Planned Parenthood Federation of America (PPFA) produced a brochure in response, titled The Facts Speak Louder than "The Silent Scream", which described the video as "riddled with scientific, medical, and legal inaccuracies as well as misleading statements and exaggerations". PPFA convened what it described as "a panel of internationally known and respected physicians" to review and critique the film, and issue a rebuttal of the claims made, including fetal pain, purposeful movement, and the titular "scream." PPFA also produced its own film, in which women, doctors, and other experts responded to the claims made in The Silent Scream, and which criticized it as portraying pregnant women as childlike and unfit to hold reproductive rights. Author and journalist Katie Roiphe described the video as "extremely suspect propaganda" and "essentially a horror movie that used frank distortions." Political scientist and pro-abortion rights activist Rosalind P. Petchesky described "its visual distortions and verbal fraud" and said it "belongs in the realm of cultural representation rather than [...] medical evidence."

== Legacy ==
According to TIME magazine's Nancy Gibbs, The Silent Scream helped "to shift the public focus from the horror stories of women who had suffered back-alley abortions to the horror movie of a fetus undergoing one." The film has been very important for the anti-abortion movement.

Nathanson later produced a follow-up film, Eclipse of Reason, depicting a late-term abortion procedure known as dilation and evacuation (D&E).
