= Another Life (1981 TV series) =

American television soap opera

- Genre: Soap opera
- Created by: Robert Aaron; Gerard Straub; Lloyd Watson; Roy Winsor
- Composer: Brent Havens
- Country of origin: United States
- Original language: English
- No. of episodes: 875

Original release
- Network: CBN
- Release: June 1, 1981 – October 5, 1984

Another Life is an American television soap opera produced and broadcast by The Christian Broadcasting Network from June 1, 1981 to October 5, 1984. It was co-created by both Gerard T. Straub and Jason Vinley and ran for 875 episodes. It attempted to combine standard afternoon intrigue with religious overtones, as many characters were portrayed as born again who relied on the power of prayer to solve their problems. Set in the fictional east coast town of Kingsley (ostensibly thought to be in Virginia), the show was taped in CBN's hometown of Virginia Beach, Virginia.

== Synopsis ==
Throughout its run, Another Life revolved around the Davidson family - local anchorman Scott Davidson (John Corsaut), his wife Terry (Mary Jean Feton), who works as a Nurse, daughter Lori (Jeannette Larson and later Debbie McLeod) and teenage son Peter (Darrel Campbell). Although the Davidsons sometime struggled with their faith, they stuck by their principles and showed compassion towards their fellow man - most notably next-door neighbor Liz Cummings (Carolyn Collings) who lives with her alcoholic and adulterous husband Jeff (Tom McGowan) and their daughter Jenny (Amy Williams)- and eschew revenge on those who have caused them grief.

Wealthy businessman Charles Carpenter (Randolph Kraft) attempted to control every situation with his power and influence and held a grudge against the Davidsons, particularly after Scott investigated a crime story involving a mob gang which has connections with Kingsley's uppercrust, which included the Carpenter family. Charles' daughter Miriam Mason (Ginger Burgett) also held a grudge against the Davidsons and filed an adultery case against Lori, accusing her of having an affair with Miriam's husband Paul (Robert Bendall), a lecturer at Kingsley College. Although it was later proved that Paul and Lori were innocent, Paul and Miriam get a divorce, with Miriam losing custody of their son Frederick- although it is often hinted that Paul does indeed have feelings for Lori. Charles would later date Terry Davidson's half-sister, the equally nefarious Nancy Lawson (Nancy Hathaway) who also clashes with the Davidsons and uses her charms to lure wealthy men into relationships with her, but never appears to hold down a steady career.

Russell "Russ" Vincent Weaver (Christopher Roland) is a pre-medical student who is about to propose to Lori. Russ found himself tangled with the drug ring when he is left with a huge debt after paying Lori's medical bills, following a serious car accident the couple are involved in. Russ is also torn between Lori and fellow peer Rebecca "Becky" Lynn Hewitt (Susan Scannell-Gilbert), who is Lori's best friend. Unknown to Lori, Becky slept with Russ after he grew frustrated with Lori's refusal to have sex with him, due to her Christian beliefs. Lori would later catch the attention of Ben Martin (Matt Williams), a handsome but older doctor who attended to Lori after her and Russ' car accident: this infuriated Russ even after Lori breaks up with him. Russ's father is later revealed to be Vince Cardello (Michael M. Ryan), a member of the local mob.

Russ and Becky secretly marry. Shortly after, Becky became the lead singer of the rock band Summerwind. The lead guitarist and founder, Phil Hayes (Scott Russell Brown), falls for Becky, thus creating tension in her relationship with Russ. Becky later becomes pregnant by Russ, but miscarries due to Summerwind's hectic schedule. After discovering Russ had cheated on her with another student Sheila Carter (Nancy Pope) and that their wedding is not legal, Becky left Russ to pursue a solo singing career in New York.

The Davidsons were also close friends of the Redlons, an African-American family which included the deeply religious Ione (Edye Byrde) and her son Gene (Eddie Hailey), who is Scott's colleague. Gene's Son James Eugene "Jimmy" (Aaron White then Troy Chandler Paris) is hospitalized following a drug overdose, but refused to name his dealer. Later, Gene became involved in a custody battle with his Wife Carla (Elain Graham and Kari Selenow) over Jimmy, who was often stuck in the middle; the situation is not helped when Carla puts her singing career before her family. Scott and Gene realized there was a connection between the mob and drug ring and both men vowed to investigate, leading to their dismissal at work, after their TV station receives threats.

The Cummings family were eventually written out of Another Life, while more families were featured: the Prescotts and the Phillipses.

== Production ==
=== Criticism ===
One of the program's creators, Bob Aaron, left the show, after a dispute on one of the show's most heavy-handed moments when Jeff was in the hospital suffering from cancer, and was miraculously healed when a beam of light entered his hospital room. Declaring such soap writing "deplorable", Aaron quit the show soon after.

=== On the set ===
Eddie Hailey, who played the non-Christian part of Gene Redlon, is actually the son of a minister. At the time of making the series, he had been a born again for some time. He credited his rebirth into Christianity as a result of his failure to win the part of Alex Haley in Roots: The Next Generations. He started attending a Los Angeles church that Bob Dylan went to. One day, he was reading a Parish magazine saw something about Another Life and later successfully auditioned for a part. While on the set of Another Life, he would lead the cast in a half hour prayer service each morning.

=== Title sequences and theme music ===
During its first nine months on the air, Another Life had a simple opening shot of a beach at sunrise. Brent Havens, who was the music director of CBN's signature show, The 700 Club, composed the theme music. The original opening and closing arrangement consisted of a trumpet solo, backed by quietly played strings and a Rhodes electric piano, which was a frequently used instrument in the show's music cues.

In March 1982, a new, jazzier opening was introduced. This sequence consisted of dramatic scenes from past episodes (which changed regularly), and close-ups of all the main characters. Starting in September of that year, the montage always ended with a shot of Terry praying in her kitchen, which dissolved into a brief portion of the sunrise beach scene from the original sequence. A "hotlicks" version of Brent Havens' theme music was used for the new opening, but the quiet original arrangement continued to be used for the end credits, which featured stills from that day's episode.

== Cancellation ==
In 1984, Another Life was cancelled due to low ratings and a shortage of advertising revenues. In its first year, 68 stations nationwide bought syndication rights to the show which reached an estimated 50,000,000 households daily, but as it entered its third year the number of stations buying the program had dropped to 25, and television ratings showed that Another Life was reaching just 500,000 households.

== Airings ==
Reruns of the series were shown on Trinity Broadcasting Network during the late 1980s and early 1990s, but have not aired in the United States since. The show has aired in the United Kingdom on the GOD TV, and in the Middle East on Middle East Television. An 1984 Koteret Rashit article profiling METV described the series as being "a sort of imitation, a miniature version of Dallas. Episodes have also been uploaded onto YouTube, and the show remains popular in Africa, particularly in Nigeria; in an interview with The Punch, Nollywood producer/director Zeb Ejiro revealed Another Life had inspired his own soap opera Ripples. As of 2017, Another Life is broadcast in the Netherlands by Christian cable channel Family7.

== Cast ==
=== Notable cast members ===
One of the show's more successful alumni Susan Scannell (Becky Hewitt), left after the first year to join the cast of Search for Tomorrow. Dee Dee Bridgewater had a minor role as Sam Marshall, Gene Redlon's boss and later love interest. Additionally, Paul Gleason, who originated the role of troublemaker Lee Carothers, would go on to greater fame as high school principal Richard Vernon in the 1985 film The Breakfast Club. Also, Matt Williams moved behind the camera after the series ended, writing for The Cosby Show - even appearing in the episode "Mrs. Westlake" - before going on to create A Different World and Roseanne and co-creating Home Improvement.

Actor	Character	Role
Mary Jean Feton	Terry Davidson	Local nurse; married to Scott; mother of Lori and Peter; half-sister of Nancy.
John Corsaut	Scott Davidson	Anchorman of the news for Kingsley's local TV station, husband of Terry.
Jeanette Larson and Debbie McLeod	Lori Davidson (later Lori Martin)	College student; daughter of Terry and Scott. Originally involved with Russ Weaver, she would later marry Dr. Ben Martin.
Darrel Campbell	Peter Davidson	Student: son of Terry and Scott, brother of Lori. Known for his frequent wisecracks.
Naomi Riseman	Nora Lindsay	Mother of Terry; step-Mother of Nancy Lawson; grandmother of Peter and Lori.
Matt Williams	Dr. Benjamin 'Ben' Martin	Local surgeon and college lecturer; married Lori after her engagement to Russ ended.
Nancy Hathaway	Nancy Lawson	Terry's half-sister; aunt to Peter and Lori; step-daughter of Nora; Another Life's main villain.
Tom Urich	Dr. Dave Philips	A physician who found Jesus and recovered from alcoholism.
Edye Byrde	Ione Redlon	Mother of Gene and one of Terry's best friends.
Eddie Hailey	Eugene 'Gene' Redlon	Local anchorman who worked with Scott Davidson, son of Ione, husband of Carla; father of Jimmy.
Elain Graham and Kari Selenow	Carla Redlon	Singer; wife of Gene; mother of Jimmy.
Aaron White and Troy Chandler Paris	James Eugene (Jimmy) Redlon	Son of Gene and Carla.
Dee Dee Bridgewater	Samantha 'Sam' Marshall	Gene's boss/love interest
Edward Allen	Leon Marshall	Real estate agent-turned- dinner chef; brother of Sam; close friend of Gene
Joseph (Joe) James	Monroe 'Monk' Lassiter	Juvenile delinquent taught by Lori
Alan Sader	Harold Webster	Local lawyer, representing the Carpenters.
Ray Owens	Mitchell "Mitch" Everett Dunbar	Local lawyer, representing the Davidsons
Julie Jenney	Barbara 'Babs' Farley	Former prostitute, lodging with the Redlons
Randy Kraft	Charles Carpenter	Local businessman, villain, married to Helen, father of Miriam
Suzanne Grandfield	Helen Carpenter	Wife of Charles, mother of Miriam.
Susan Claire Carey	Courtney Carpenter-Sumner	Niece of Charles, and cousin of Miriam; dated Peter Davidson, but was pressurized into marrying Vaughn Sumner.
Ginger Burgett	Miriam Mason (née Carpenter)	Daughter of Charles and Helen, and formerly married to Paul Mason; mother of his son, Fredrick.
Robert Bendall	Professor Paul Mason	Local college professor; ex-husband of Miriam, and father of Fredrick.
Jeff Jamison	Norman 'Norm' Eliot	Business associate of Charles'; in love with Miriam; holds grudge against Lori
David Kelly Gwinn	Hugo 'Lance' Lancelot (Miriam's kidnapper), and Jeremy Lancelot (Lance's twin brother) (Dual role)	Hugo kidnapped Miriam, and Jeremy fell for her
Nicholas "Nick" Benedict	Ronnie Washington	Head of drug/prostitution ring; Miriam's kidnapper
Chandler Hill Harbin	Blue Nobles	Also known as "Cinderella Rapist"; works for Ronnie
Nancy Allen	Paula James	Local prostitute working for Ronnie Washington
Christopher Roland	Russell 'Russ' Vincent Weaver	Pre-med student; college football hero; Lori's boyfriend. Secretly involved with Becky Hewitt
Michael M. Ryan	Vincent 'Vince' Cardello	Local gangster; father of Russ; associate of Charles
Marty Rowe	Carrie Weaver	Mother of Russ; Vince's secret mistress
Susan Scannell-Gilbert	Rebecca 'Becky' Lynn Hewitt	Student/Model/Singer; Lori's best friend and college roommate; has a secret affair with Russ
Chris Auer	Francis Miller	Student at college; has unrequited crush on Becky
Read Morgan	Jason Prescott	Local building construction manager/Politician; father of Gil and Marianne
Jerry Timm and J. Michael Hunter	Gil Prescott	Works in father's firm; male chauvinist playboy
Renee McCullah	Marianne Prescott	Lori's friend who works in father's firm; dates Russ after Becky's departure
Peggy Smithhart-Barrois	Amber Phillips	Model; daughter of Dave and Kate Phillips; sister of Stacey
Karen Chapman	Stacey Phillips	News reporter; daughter of Dave and Kate Phillips
John Albert Cardoza and Tom Urich	Dr. Dave Phillips	Former abortionist-turned-general practitioner; ex-husband of Kate; father of Amber and Stacey
Dorothy Stinnette	Kate Phillips-Carothers	Former wife of Dr. Dave Phillips. Mother of Amber and Stacey
Paul Gleason, Jim Williams and John Carroll	Lee Carothers	One of the wealthiest residents of Kingsley; political associate, and later fiancé of Kate
Diane Yohe	Vanessa Fazan	Head of local secret society DOMI; hypnotist
Thomas (Tom) McGowan	Jeff Cummings	Next-door neighbor of the Davidsons; husband of Liz father of Jennifer
Carolyn Collings	Liz Cummings	Jeff's wife, Terry's neighbor and friend and mother of Jennifer.
Michele Seidman	Jill Hanson	Juvenile delinquent living with the Cummings
Donna McLaughlin-Wyant	Judge Bethany "Beth" Sleighmaker	Local court judge; biological mother of Jill
Annamarie Smith-Butz	Vicki Lang	Love interest of Peter; worked with Gene, and later Miriam
Robert (*Bob) Morris Burchette	Dr. Alex Greenley	Local doctor at Kingsley General; love interest of Terry
Frankie Cardoza	Lucille Figgins	Local nurse at clinic
Scott Russell Brown	Phil Hayes	Founder of rock band 'Summerwind'; rival of Russ Weaver
