= Eclipse of Reason =

1987 anti-abortion documentary film

- DVD cover
- Directed by: Bernard Nathanson
- Produced by: Bernard Nathanson; Adelle Roban Nathanson
- Narrated by: Bernard Nathanson; Charlton Heston
- Distributed by: American Portrait Films
- Release date: 1987
- Running time: 27 mins.
- Country: USA
- Language: English

Eclipse of Reason is a 1987 anti-abortion documentary video directed, filmed, and narrated by Bernard Nathanson, with an introduction by Charlton Heston. Eclipse of Reason is a follow-up to Nathanson’s first film The Silent Scream. The film contains a depiction of a dilation and evacuation (D&E) abortion. The subject matter of this film focuses more on the moral implications of abortion. It is a tool for evangelizing abolition of abortion. This film, as well as The Silent Scream, was instrumental in the Right to Life Committee's garnering the attention of the United States public regarding the issue of abortion.

The film serves to combat critics to The Silent Scream who argue that, although Nathanson claimed the film relied only on imagery and not pejorative speech, the film was heavily reliant on upon the language of the narrator.

== Overview ==
Eclipse of Reason shows a late term abortion occurring sometime after the fourth month of pregnancy. The film focuses on the limbs of the fetus while in the womb then proceeds to show the abortion in graphic detail. While the fetus in Nathanson’s previous film was little more than a black and white pulsating image, the fetus in Eclipse of Reason was shown vividly in full color.

Different women who have had abortions and suffered harmful effects from the procedure give testimony later in the film.

Nathanson concludes Eclipse of Reason with a montage of photographs that depicts his idea of opposing worlds, one filled with abortions and one without abortions. He argues there is no place for violence in a world of reason.

== Critical reception ==
According to Newsweek, the film is "harder for critics to dismiss as misleading" than was The Silent Scream.

Eclipse of Reason is most heavily criticized for its idealization of the “World of Reason” and for creating a dichotomy that may not exist in between the two hypothetical worlds.
