= List of 1970s Christian pop artists =

This is a list of notable contemporary Christian music artists from the 1970s.

The Encyclopedia of Contemporary Christian Music (2002) defines CCM as "music that appeals to self-identified fans of contemporary Christian music on account of a perceived connection to what they regard as Christianity". Based on this definition, this list includes artists that work in the Christian music industry as well as artists in the general market.

== 0-9 ==
- 2nd Chapter of Acts

== A ==
- After the Fire (ATF)
- Dennis Agajanian
- All Saved Freak Band
- The Alpha Band
- The Archers

== B ==
- a band called David
- Brown Bannister
- Bash-n-the-Code
- Bob Bennett
- Debby Boone
- Pat Boone
- Scott Wesley Brown
- Anita Bryant
- T Bone Burnett
- Wendell Burton

== C ==
- Steve Camp
- Glen Campbell
- Ralph Carmichael
- Johnny Cash
- Chalice
- Children of the Day
- Chris Christian
- Paul Clark
- Terry Clark
- Cynthia Clawson
- Bruce Cockburn
- Denny Correll
- Andrae Crouch (and the Disciples)
- Andrew Culverwell
- The Continental Singers
- Celebration

== D ==
- Daniel Amos (a.k.a. DA and da)
- David and the Giants
- Mike Deasy
- DeGarmo and Key
- Dino
- Dion
- Jessy Dixon
- Phil Driscoll
- Roby Duke
- Bob Dylan

== E ==
- Evie

== F ==
- Mark Farner
- Don Francisco
- Found Free
- Aretha Franklin
- Richie Furay

== G ==
- The Bill Gaither Trio
- Chuck Girard
- Glad
- Glass Harp
- Amy Grant
- Al Green
- Keith Green
- Peter Green
- Steve Green
- Arlo Guthrie

== H ==
- Danniebelle Hall
- Pam Mark Hall
- Larnelle Harris
- Harvest
- Edwin Hawkins (and the Edwin Hawkins Singers)
- Bryn Haworth
- Mark Heard
- Heritage Singers
- Annie Herring
- Benny Hester
- Dallas Holm
- Honeytree
- Jimmy Hotz
- Tom Howard
- Billie Hughes

== I ==
- The Imperials

== J ==
- Jerusalem

== K ==
- Tonio K.
- Kurt Kaiser
- Kansas
- Phil Keaggy
- Dave Kelly

== L ==
- Lazarus
- Liberation Suite
- Little Richard
- Love Song

== M ==
- Malcolm and Alwyn
- Darrell Mansfield
- Randy Matthews
- Barry McGuire
- Sister Janet Mead
- Ken Medema
- David Meece
- Mighty Clouds of Joy
- Van Morrison
- Mustard Seed Faith
- Mylon and Holy Smoke

== N ==
- Larry Norman

== O ==
- Oak Ridge Boys
- Doug Oldham
- Michael and Stormie Omartian

== P ==
- Leon Patillo
- Sandi Patty
- Gary S. Paxton
- Dan Peek
- Petra
- Andy Pratt
- Elvis Presley
- Billy Preston
- Pantano Salsbury

== R ==
- Reba Rambo
- Ray Repp
- Resurrection Band (a.k.a. Rez Band)
- Cliff Richard
- Johnny Rivers
- Austin Roberts

== S ==
- Seawind
- Tim Sheppard
- Simon & Garfunkel
- B.W. Stevenson
- Randy Stonehill
- Noel Paul Stookey
- Sweet Comfort Band
- Michael W. Smith

== T ==
- John Michael Talbot
- B.J. Thomas
- Truth
- Tim Sheppard

== W ==
- Matthew Ward
- Wayne Watson
- The Way
- Kelly Willard
- Lanny Wolfe Trio
- Christine Wyrtzen
