= Manna Music Inc =

Manna Music
- Founded: 1955
- Founder: Tim Spencer
- Genre: Christian, gospel
- Country of origin: U.S.
- Official website: www.mannamusicinc.com

Manna Music was founded in 1955 by Tim Spencer as a song publishing company. During the early 1970s through the mid 1980s it included its own label, Manna Records.

== Manna Music ==
The publishing company has worked with numerous Christian songwriters, including Doris Akers, Andrae Crouch, Dan Barker, Andrew Culverwell, Stuart Hamblen, and Ralph Carmichael.

In the early days of its existence, Manna attained ownership of "How Great Thou Art", written by Stuart K. Hine. According to ASCAP, the song has been recorded by many mainstream and gospel artists, including Elvis Presley, Lee Greenwood, The Imperials, The Oak Ridge Boys, The Florida Boys, and George Beverly Shea.

Hal Spencer later took over the company and in 1979 was presented the ASCAP Award for Gospel Publisher of the Year.

== Manna Records ==
In the late 1960s, Manna Music formed the label Manna Records and began producing albums by Ralph Carmichael, The Crownsmen, Andrew Culverwell, Doris Akers, Bob Cull, Paul Johnson and his wife Kathie Lee Johnson, among others.

Manna also produced a number of church musicals and cantatas. Among them were In His Presence and Sing Christmas.

During the mid 1980s, the Manna Records label became inactive. As of 2016, the parent company, Manna Music Inc., was still in operation out of Pacific City, Oregon.

== Songs ==
- "How Great Thou Art" – Stuart K. Hine
- "Sweet, Sweet Spirit" – Doris Akers
- "The Blood Will Never Lose Its Power" – Andraé Crouch
- "Through It All" – Andraé Crouch
- "Heaven" – Andraé Crouch
- "Spread a Little Love Around" – Danny Lee Stutzman
- "Come On Ring Those Bells" – Andrew Culverwell
- "I've Never Seen the Righteous Forsaken" – Archie Dennis, Jr

== Artists ==
- Dale Evans
- Doris Akers
- Lillie Knauls
- Dan Barker
- The Kathryn Kuhlman Choir
- June Wade & The Country Congregation
- The Crownsmen
- The Californians Quartet
- Audrey Mieir
- Andrew Culverwell
- The Second Coming

== See also ==
- List of record labels
