= Culverwell =

Culverwell may refer to:

== Places ==
- Caliente, Nevada, formerly known as Culverwell
- Culverwell Mesolithic Site, on the Isle of Portland, Dorset, England

== People ==
- Nathaniel Culverwell (1619–1651), an English author and theologian
- Cyril Thomas Culverwell (1895–1963), a British Conservative Party politician
- Andrew Culverwell (born 1944), an English Contemporary Christian music artist and songwriter
- Charles Wyndham (actor) (1837–1919), born as Charles Culverwell
