= The Crownsmen =

- Also known as: The Crownsmen Quartet
- Origin: United States
- Genres: Southern Gospel; Contemporary Christian
- Years active: 1970—present
- Label: Manna Records

The Crownsmen is an American Christian gospel band.

== The early years ==
Formed in the early 1970s by Dan Hunter, the original vocal line up was Dan (bass), Ted Hunter (Dan's son, baritone), Jim Davis (lead) and Randy Price (tenor). Dan acted as manager while young Ted Hunter spearheaded the musical direction of the group. Their first album Sounds of Reality was released in 1972 on a local Southern California indie label "Love Inc." The album featured the original studio version of the Crownsmen's most requested song "Heaven".

== The Manna years ==
In 1973, the Crownsmen signed a deal with Hal Spenser's Manna Records, which was a division of Manna Music Inc. They stepped into MCA/Whitney Studios in Glendale, California, to record their first album on the label "I'm Gonna Take a Trip". The album featured songs such as "The Lighthouse", "Daddy Sang Bass", and Lavern Tripp's classic "I Know". In 1974, the Crownsmen released their 3rd album, and 2nd for Manna, It's Gonna Be a Morning to Remember, featuring compositions by pianist Jody Barry. Original lead singer Jim Davis who left soon after this album was released. In 1975 the Crownsmen recorded LIVE, an album that featured Rev. Dick Hillary as the Master of Ceremonies. Band members included Marty Adams (piano), Rick Mayfield (lead guitar), and Mike Gordon (drums).

=== All in the Family ===
In 1976 all four front members of the Crownsmen were related for the first time. Pam Hunter (Dan's daughter) and Rick Evans joined the group. This lineup was backed by band members Terry Cross (drums), Keith Hughes (keyboards) & Gary Kaufman (lead guitar). "I'm Gonna Rise" was released in 1977. In 1979, the Crownsmen recorded You Gave the Song with the title song composed by Keith Hughes. This was described as one of the most versatile albums the Crownsmen ever recorded, with instrumental enhancements by new pianist Tracy Heaston. (Keith met Tracy by chance at university and the two traded situations between a full-time student and Crownsmen keyboardist.) You Gave the Song featured everything from Southern gospel, to country gospel and contemporary Christian music. Group members' college graduations, marriages, and family responsibilities evoked the inevitable, "to everything there is a season."

=== The 1980s ===
In 1981, Dan Hunter brought to the Crownsmen former original member Jim Davis, former member Rick Gentry and new member Joe Wilson, who was the pastor for the Rock of Faith Church in Ontario, California, which at that time was called Liberty Christian Center. Dan brought in musicians to form a full live band. The Crownsmen for the first time expanded to 10 members (including the bus driver).

The Crownsmen released the Country/Traditional album Back to the Basics, featuring such songs as "Excuses" and "God Walks The Dark Hills". The album was a return to traditional Southern Gospel Music. In 1982, the Crownsmen released their final live album and their final album for Manna Records, On Stage.

In 1983, the Crownsmen regrouped with Ted, his sister, Pam, Dan, and Rick Evans. The family performed concerts accompanied by Rick Balentine on keyboards and Jeff Olson on drums. This version lasted for a year or two.

=== The 1990s ===
By 1990 Dan Hunter would see new life coming into The Crownsmen with wife Debbie, Brian Beathard on lead vocals, and Zack de la Rocha singing baritone. Dan would run through a number of musicians through the 90s before Zack finally run the whole band through his keyboard. In the mid-90s Tony Gonzales, a fan of the Crownsmen, became the next guitarist, and the Crownsmen were set once again for The Road.

In 1995, Brian Beathard moved to Tennessee, leaving the Crownsmen without a lead singer. Douglas Brown, already a veteran performer on the west coast, stepped in to fill the lead part.

Dan got a surprise when the former lead singer Rick Gentry placed a call. In 1996, Gentry moved back down to Southern California and rejoined the Crownsmen and plans were underway for their next album.

The Road was released in 1998 featuring all brand-new material, songs written by Debbie, as well as Brian Beathard and Ted & Penny Hunter.

=== 2000 & Beyond ===
In 2002, the Crownsmen released their final album with Rick Gentry, Debbie Hunter, and Zack delaRosa, called THE CROWNSMEN. The CD featured a new version of "The Coming Of The Lord", as well as the Heavy Rock N' Roll version of "The B.I.B.L.E."

In 2003, Gentry left the Crownsmen to sing with The Watchmen Quartet and delaRosa took a job with a recording studio. The Crownsmen shut down.

In 2005 Dan moved back to Arkansas where he was born and is currently working on the next version of The Crownsmen.

Ted Hunter formed a new music ministry with Penny, his wife of 30 years. Ted is often called upon to assist other ministries in the area of music.

Tracy Heaston became a pianist at Dollywood in Pigeon Forge, Tennessee, and the Echo Hollow Jubilee Show in Branson, Missouri.

Rick Evans went on to be a member of the Legendary Californians Quartet, and is a consultant to many churches and organizations. Evans also travelled with Dennis Agajanian and appeared for Billy Graham, Promise Keepers, and the Harvest Crusades with Greg Laurie. Rick also enjoyed more than 10 years as a featured member of the Franklin Graham Crusade team and in 2005, he became a member of gospel music's The Imperials (The Classic Imperials)

Randy Price became a member of the Legendary Californians Quartet. He then went on to form his own group called Sweet Water in the 1980s before becoming a member of the Songfellows Quartet in the 90s.

Both Jim Davis & Joe Wilson died sometime in the 1990s (exact dates unknown at this time).

Douglas Brown died April 13, 2006.

Keith Hughes won a national piano scholarship competition and completed a classical concert tour of the U.S. and Canada before soloing at Carnegie Hall. He became a conceptual writer in the creative development of projects for The Walt Disney Company, Warner Bros., FOX Entertainment, and Universal Studios.

Rick Balentine is a composer and producer in Los Angeles composing music for many clients including Coke, Chevrolet, GMC, JCPenney and Budweiser as well as composing orchestral music for music libraries. He owns SCORE LA <media> recording studios in Van Nuys California, a fully equipped 5.1 music production facility, and is currently working on composing music for video games.

== Vocal Members ==
- 01. Dan Hunter (Bass) 1970–2002
- 02. Ted Hunter (Baritone) 1970-1980, 1983
- 03. Jim Davis (Lead, Baritone) 1970-1974, 1980–1982
- 04. Randy Price (Tenor) 1970-1976
- 05. Floyd Terry (Lead) 1974
- 06. Rick Gentry (Lead) 1975-1976, 1980–1982, 1996-2002
- 07. Pam Hunter (Tenor) 1976-1980, 1983
- 08. Rick Evans (Lead) 1976-1980, 1983
- 09. Joe Wilson (Tenor) 1980-1982
- 10. Wayne Landes (Lead) 1984-1993
- 11. Debbie Hunter (Tenor) 1990-2002
- 12. Zack delaRosa (Baritone) 1990-2002
- 13. Brian Beathard (Lead) 1993-1995
- 14. Douglas Brown (Lead) 1995-1996

== Band members ==
- 01. Ted Hunter (Bass Guitar / Steel Guitar) 1970-1980, 1983
- 02. Jim Stuckey (Piano) 1970-1972
- 03. John Billester (Drums) 1970-1974
- 04. Danny Potson (Guitar) 1970-1973
- 05. Jody Barry (Piano) 1973-1974
- 06. Rich Mayfield (Guitar) 1973-1975
- 07. Marty Adams (Piano) 1975-1976
- 08. Ken Snyder (Drums) 1975-1976
- 09. Keith Hughes (Piano/synth/composer) 1976-1978
- 10. Mike Gordon (Drums) 1975-1976
- 11. Terry Cross (Drums) 1977-1980
- 12. Gary Kauffman (Guitar) 1977-1979
- 13. Tracy Heaston (Piano/Keyboards) 1979-1980
- 14. Tim Bailey (Guitar) 1979-1980
- 15. Roy Cooper (Bass) 1980-1983
- 16. John Thompson (Guitar, Steel) 1980-1983
- 17. Chris Harring (Drums) 1980-1982
- 18. Mike Cross (Piano) 1980-1983
- 19. Wayne Landes (Guitar, Fiddle, Banjo, Mandolin, Hands) 1980-1983
- 20. Jeff Olson (Drums) 1982-1985
- 21. Rick Balentine (Keyboards) 1983–1989
- 21. Zack delaRosa (Keyboards) 1990-2002
- 22. Kenny Jure Jr (Drums, Guitars) 1991-1993
- 23. Rob Olson (Bass) 1991-1993
- 24. Tony Gonzales (Guitar) 1995-2001
- 25. Nelson Beltran (Guitar) 2001
- 26. Don Wheeler (Guitar) 2001-2002

== Discography ==
- 1972 Sounds of Reality (Love, Inc)
- 1973 I'm Gonna Take A Trip (Manna Records)
- 1974 It's Gonna Be A Morning to Remember (Manna Records)
- 1975 The Crownsmen LIVE (Manna Records)
- 1978 I'm Gonna Rise (Manna Records)
- 1979 You Gave the Song (Manna Records)
- 1981 Back To the Basics (Manna Records)
- 1982 On Stage (Manna Records)
- 1998 The Road (HC Ministries/Indie)
- 2002 The Crownsmen (HC Ministries/Indie)
