= Ins Wasser fällt ein Stein =

Christian hymn

- Christian hymn
- English: A stone falls into the water
- Written: 1973
- Text: by Manfred Siebald
- Language: German
- Based on: "Pass it on"
- Melody: by Kurt Kaiser
- Composed: 1969

"Ins Wasser fällt ein Stein" (A stone falls into the water) is a 2001 Christian song with text by Manfred Siebald, with a melody by Kurt Kaiser. The hymn of the genre Neues Geistliches Lied is contained in several hymnals and songbooks.

== History ==
The text "Ins Wasser fällt ein Stein" is based on an English song, "Pass it on" ("It only takes a spark") with text by Paul Janz and 1969 music by Kurt Kaiser. The German version was written by Manfred Siebald. The song has been recommended for baptisms because the song is focused on how small beginnings can become a blessing.

The song has three stanzas. The melody is in common time. Its range is rather wide, and depending on the abilities of a congregation may be better introduced by a soloist. The song is contained in regional sections of the Protestant hymnal Evangelisches Gesangbuch, in hymnals for young people and in several songbooks.
