= Saving Power =

Live album by Generation Unleashed
- Released: November 19, 2010
- Recorded: January–February, 2010
- Genre: Contemporary worship
- Length: 63:57
- Label: Maranatha!
- Producer: Jeremy Scott

Generation Unleashed chronology
| Generation Unleashed (2008) | Saving Power (2010) | BridgeCity (2013) |

Professional ratings
Review scores
| Source | Rating |
|---|---|
| New Release Tuesday | 4/5 stars |

Saving Power is the fifth live album from the American worship band of the annual Generation Unleashed conference in Portland, Oregon. The album was released on November 19, 2010 under Maranatha! Music, in partnership with Air1 Radio.

The band is now formally known as BridgeCity, as they released their debut self-titled album in 2013.

== Track list ==
| No. | Title | Writer(s) | Length |
|---|---|---|---|
| 1. | "Intro" | Isaac Tarter | 1:58 |
| 2. | "Sing" | Tarter | 4:24 |
| 3. | "Standard" | Jeremy Scott | 4:09 |
| 4. | "Our God Reigns" | Scott, Tarter, Bryan Bettis | 4:23 |
| 5. | "I Am Alive" | Tarter | 5:13 |
| 6. | "I Will Praise You" | Kim-Maree Roberts | 6:23 |
| 7. | "By The Cross" | Tarter | 6:29 |
| 8. | "Never Looking Back" | Tarter, Scott | 3:20 |
| 9. | "He Lives" | Scott | 4:22 |
| 10. | "Anthem" | Donna Lasit | 9:08 |
| 11. | "Holding On" | Bettis | 6:22 |
| 12. | "Saving Power" | Scott | 7:23 |
| Total length: | | | 63:57 |

== Personnel ==
Primary band

- Jeremy Scott – lead vocals, acoustic guitar, executive producer, producer, pre/post production
- Bryan Bettis – lead vocals, piano, vocal production
- Kim-Maree Roberts – lead vocals
- Robby Palmer – lead vocals
- Donna Lasit – lead vocals
- Yasuhito Hontani – electric guitar
- Jer Leary – electric guitar
- Gabe Adams – electric guitar
- Matt Bushard – bass
- Jay Sudarma – drums, graphic design/art direction
- Nate Scott – drums

Additional singers

- Josh Cross, Genovieve Belindean, Ruthie Miller, Erica Scott, Stephanie Truong, Karina Jameson, Amy Bettis, Dylan Miller

Additional production

- Jenee' Fahndrich – choir director
- Katrina Tarter – choir director
- Jenny Civis – choir director
- Poncho Lowder – executive producer
- Brian Lawrence – FOH engineer, music engineer, pre/post production
- Chris Chesnutt – FOH engineer
- Alex Corson – FOH assistant
- David Benton – monitor engineer
- Rocky Ortega – monitor engineer
- Min Bae – monitor assistant
- Takahiro Fujii – music engineer, tracking engineer, pre/post production
- Colby Goddard – assistant tracking engineer
- Henry Seeley – mixer
- Dan Shike – mastering
- Joh Ridley – assistant
- Nick Priest – assistant
- Chris Crary – DVD producer
- Frank & Sharon Damazio – lead pastors

Camera men & stage lighting

- Nate Scott, Brandon Daniel, Josh Enobakhare, Mark Nashif Caleb Brown, David Bushard, Chris Corrado, Chris Crary, Dylan Miller (camera assistant)
- Garrett Syfrett, Matt Rich, Henry Truong, Joe Vogel

== Music videos ==
- Sing (and Intro) on YouTube
- Our God Reigns on YouTube
- I Am Alive on YouTube
- He Lives on YouTube
- Saving Power on YouTube

(These videos can also be found on the special deluxe edition DVD of the release)

== Notes ==
- The band is based out of City Bible Church in Portland, Oregon and has been around since 1993 for the annual youth conference: Generation Unleashed.
- The song "Our God Reigns" was later given a studio recording version on BridgeCity's debut self-titled album in 2013.
- The song "He Lives" was originally on the band's fourth live album entitled Generation Unleashed.
- The special deluxe edition of the album comes with a DVD which includes a documentary and a few music videos.
- The 2010 Generation Unleashed conference, at which the album was recorded, was entitled Saving Power.
