= Matthew 7:12 =

- ← 7:11 7:13 →
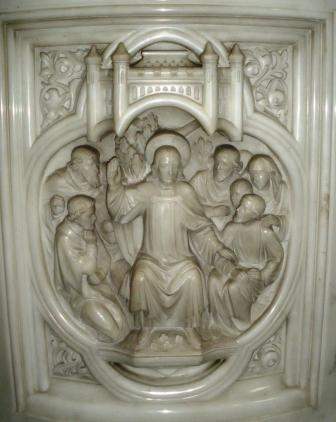
- "The Sermon on the Mount" - The central panel on the pulpit of St Stephen's Church, Bournemouth, as carved by Nathaniel Hitch.
- Book: Gospel of Matthew
- Christian Bible part: New Testament

Matthew 7:12 is the twelfth verse of the seventh chapter of the Gospel of Matthew in the New Testament and is part of the Sermon on the Mount. This well known verse presents what has become known as the Golden Rule.

== Content ==
In the King James Version of the Bible the text reads:

Therefore all things whatsoever ye would that men should do to you:
do ye even so to them: for this is the law and the prophets

The World English Bible translates the passage as:

Therefore whatever you desire for men to do to you, you
shall also do to them; for this is the law and the prophets.

The Novum Testamentum Graece text is:

Πάντα οὖν ὅσα ἐὰν θέλητε ἵνα ποιῶσιν ὑμῖν οἱ ἄνθρωποι,
οὕτως καὶ ὑμεῖς ποιεῖτε αὐτοῖς· οὗτος γάρ ἐστιν ὁ νόμος καὶ οἱ προφῆται.

== Analysis ==
This verse is considered to be a summation of the entire sermon. Some editions append it to the end of Matthew 7:7-11, and the rule does seem to be an expansion on the teaching about prayer in that section. However, the word therefore and the mention of the law and the prophets implies that this is a more far reaching teaching. Davies and Allison note that this is indicated by the mention of the law and the prophets, which links the verse back to Matthew 5:17, the start of the teaching on ethics. The verse is most closely linked with the teaching to "love thy enemies" in Matthew 5:44. In Luke 6:31 the Rule is present just after the teaching about enemies, making the link even more explicit. Luz notes that as well as summarizing the sermon, this rule also adapts it to normal life. While verses like Matthew 5:29 seem incompatible with reality, the teachings in this verse can reasonably be attempted by all.

Richard Thomas France notes that the negative form of the Golden Rule, or the "Silver Rule" as it is sometimes called: 'don't do to others what you don't want them to do to you', appears in several works of Greek philosophy and also in earlier Jewish writings. It also appears in other traditions such as Buddhism and Confucianism.

When Jesus spoke to the Sadducees, his words would have been most familiar to them. In the Torah, Moses gives The Shema to his people in the book of Deuteronomy 6:4-9, the most important of all Jewish prayers. It is a declaration of faith and a pledge of allegiance to God. Twice daily, recitation of the Shema Israel is a mitzvah for the Jewish people—it is said upon rising in the morning and going to sleep at night. It is said when praising God and when petitioning him. The Shema Israel is the first prayer taught to Jewish children and it is the last words a Jew says before death. The Shema is recited in preparation for the reading of the Torah on the Sabbath and Jewish holidays and at the end of the holiest day, Yom Kippur. Judaism teaches that the name of God is not read aloud in the Shema; it is replaced with Adonai ("my Lord")

Luz notes that some scholars see the positive version as being very important because it instructs all disciples to work actively for the good of others, not simply to desist passively from doing harm. However, Luz notes that in actual implementation there is not a great deal of difference between the two formulations. He ascribes much of the efforts to divide the two ideas to anti-Judaic prejudices of many Biblical scholars. Early Christian writers saw little difference between the two versions, and several paraphrased this verse with the negative form.

The good end does not justify the evil means. The Golden Rule may not be perverted to justify an evil means. St. Augustine noticed this problem and commented on how many redactors rephrased this verse as "whatsoever good you desire…"

The concluding phrase indicates that Jesus is here presenting the Golden Rule as a valid summary for the entirety of moral law. It might also be a reference to Hillel, whose negative formulation of the Golden Rule ended with a similar statement that it represented the totality of Biblical teachings. The author of Matthew presents a second summation of religious law at Matthew 22:40, where Jesus tells his followers there are but two laws: to love God and to love neighbour. While phrased differently, these two basic laws are essentially the same.

== Commentary from the Church Fathers ==
Augustine: Firmness and strength of walking by the way of wisdom in good habits is thus set before us, by which men are brought to purity and simplicity of heart; concerning which having spoken a long time, He thus concludes, All things whatsoever ye would, &c. For there is no man who would that another should act towards him with a double heart.

Pseudo-Chrysostom: Otherwise; He had above commanded us in order to sanctify our prayers that men should not judge those who sin against them. Then breaking the thread of his discourse He had introduced various other matters, wherefore now when He returns to the command with which He had begun, He says, All things whatsoever ye would, &c. That is; I not only command that ye judge not, but All things whatsoever ye would that men should do unto you, do ye unto them; and then you will be able to pray so as to obtain.

Glossa Ordinaria: Otherwise; The Holy Spirit is the distributor of all spiritual goods, that the deeds of charity may be fulfilled; whence He adds, All things therefore &c.

Chrysostom: Otherwise; The Lord desires to teach that men ought to seek aid from above, but at the same time to contribute what lays in their power; wherefore when He had said, Ask, seek, and knock, He proceeds to teach openly that men should be at pains for themselves, adding, Whatsoever ye would &c.

Augustine: Otherwise; The Lord had promised that He would give good things to them that ask Him. But that He may own his petitioners, let us also own ours. For they that beg are in everything, save having of substance, equal to those of whom they beg. What face can you have of making request to your God, when you do not acknowledge your equal? This is that is said in Proverbs, Whoso stoppeth his ear to the cry of the poor, he shall cry and shall not be heard. (Prov. 21:13.) What we ought to bestow on our neighbour when he asks of us, that we ourselves may be heard of God, we may judge by what we would have others bestow upon us; therefore He says, All things whatsoever ye would.

Chrysostom: He says not, All things whatsoever, simply, but All things therefore, as though He should say, If ye will be heard, besides those things which I have now said to you, do this also. And He said not, Whatsoever you would have done for you by God, do that for your neighbour; lest you should say, But how can I? but He says, Whatsoever you would have done to you by your fellow-servant, do that also to your neighbour.

Cyprian: Since the Word of God, the Lord Jesus Christ came to all men, He summed up all his commands in one precept, Whatsoever ye would that men should do to you, do ye also to them; and adds, for this is the Law and the Prophets.

Pseudo-Chrysostom: For whatsoever ever the Law and the Prophets contain up and down through the whole Scriptures, is embraced in this one compendious precept, as the innumerable branches of a tree spring from one root.

Gregory the Great: He that thinks he ought to do to another as he expects that others will do to him, considers verily how he may return good things for bad, and better things for good.

Chrysostom: Whence what we ought to do is clear, as in our own cases we all know what is proper, and so we cannot take refuge in our ignorance.

Augustine: This precept seems to refer to the love of our neighbour, not of God, as in another place He says, there are two commandments on which hang the Law and the Prophets. But as He says not here, The whole Law, as He speaks there, He reserves a place for the other commandment respecting the love of God.

Augustine: Otherwise; Scripture does not mention the love of God, where it says, All things whatsoever ye would; because he who loves his neighbour must consequently love Love itself above all things; but God is Love; therefore he loves God above all things.

Preceded by Matthew 7:11	Gospel of Matthew; Chapter 7	Succeeded by Matthew 7:13
