= Karen Lafferty =

American singer (born 1948)

- Born: February 29, 1948 (age 78)
- Education: Eastern New Mexico University
- Genres: Contemporary Christian music
- Occupation: Musician
- Website: karenlafferty.com

Karen Lafferty (born February 29, 1948) is an American Contemporary Christian musician from Alamogordo, New Mexico.

Lafferty graduated from Eastern New Mexico University and unsuccessfully attempted to join a Campus Crusade for Christ musical ensemble shortly after. Intending to pursue a career in secular music, she moved to southern California, soon beginning to perform at Calvary Chapel Costa Mesa. She toured the Netherlands as an opener for Children of the Day in 1973 and released her debut album on Maranatha! Music two years later. Following the release of her second album, Sweet Communion, she toured Europe as a headlining act.

While on tour, Lafferty noted how popular American music was, even though, for most professional American musicians, touring Europe was not financially viable. In response she founded Musicians for Missions in 1981, under the ministry of Youth With A Mission (YWAM) Holland. This organization sought to train young Christian musicians for mission tours where they could perform live shows. She later moved to Amsterdam to direct the organization.

Lafferty is the author of the praise and worship song "Seek Ye First", first released on a 1974 Maranatha compilation.

== Discography ==
- Bird in a Golden Sky (Maranatha! Music, 1975)
- Sweet Communion (Maranatha, 1978)
- Life Pages (Maranatha, 1980)
- Country to Country (Ministry Resource Center, 1983)
- Land of No Goodbyes (Asaph, 1989)
- Multitudes: Sounds of Many Nations (MFM, 2004)
- Singing My Heart Out (MFM, 2008)
