= Generation Unleashed =

Live album by Generation Unleashed
- Released: January 29, 2008
- Recorded: January–February 2007
- Genre: Contemporary worship
- Length: 62:59
- Label: Maranatha!
- Producer: Donna Lasit, Jeremy Scott

Generation Unleashed chronology
God's Not Dead (2007)	Generation Unleashed (2008)	Saving Power (2010)

Generation Unleashed is the fourth live album from American worship band of the annual Generation Unleashed conference in Portland, Oregon. The album was released on January 29, 2008, under Maranatha! Music.

== Track listing ==
No.	Title	Writer(s)	Length
1.	"Always"	Jeremy Scott	4:48
2.	"He Lives"	Scott	3:50
3.	"Saved My Soul"	Scott	5:06
4.	"Through Christ"	Donna Lasit	5:14
5.	"Song In My Heart"	Matt Bushard	4:44
6.	"King of All"	Isaac Tarter, Scott, Bushard	4:09
7.	"Shout It Out"	Scott	4:05
8.	"Be Lifted High"	Jordan Filip	4:01
9.	"I Worship You"	Esther Filip	5:21
10.	"Shine"	Scott	5:37
11.	"All That I Need"	Tarter	5:03
12.	"Carried Me"	Lasit	4:56
13.	"I Love You Lord" (originally performed by Petra)	Laurie Klein	6:05
Total length:			62:59

== Personnel ==
- Jeremy Scott - lead vocals, acoustic guitar, producer, pre/post production
- Donna Lasit - lead vocals, piano, producer
- Jordan Filip - lead vocals, background vocals, assistant producer
- Esther Filip - lead vocals, background vocals
- Lisa Trent - background vocals
- Yasuhito Hontani - electric guitar
- Jer Leary - electric guitar, background vocals
- Stephen Bostwick - electric guitar
- Matt Bushard - bass
- Isaac Tarter - keyboard
- Jay Sudarma - drums, graphic design

Additional production

- Doug Lasit - executive producer
- Randy Alward - executive producer
- Ryan Callahan - FOH engineer
- Chris Chesnutt - FOH assistant
- David Benton - monitor engineer
- Brian Lawrence - engineer, pre/post production
- Takahiro Fujii - engineer, pre/post production
- Andy Dodd - mixing
- Adam Watts - mixing
- Nic Rodriguez - mixing assistant
- Robert Hadley - mastering
- Chris Corrado - graphic design
- Nathan Scott - photography
- Jim Dahm - photography
- Garrett Syfrett - stage lighting

== Notes ==
- The band is based out of City Bible Church in Portland, Oregon and has been around since 1993 for the annual youth conference: Generation Unleashed.
- Some versions of the album come with a bonus DVD which include bonus material regarding the release.
