= Matthew 7:9 =

- ← 7:8 7:10 →
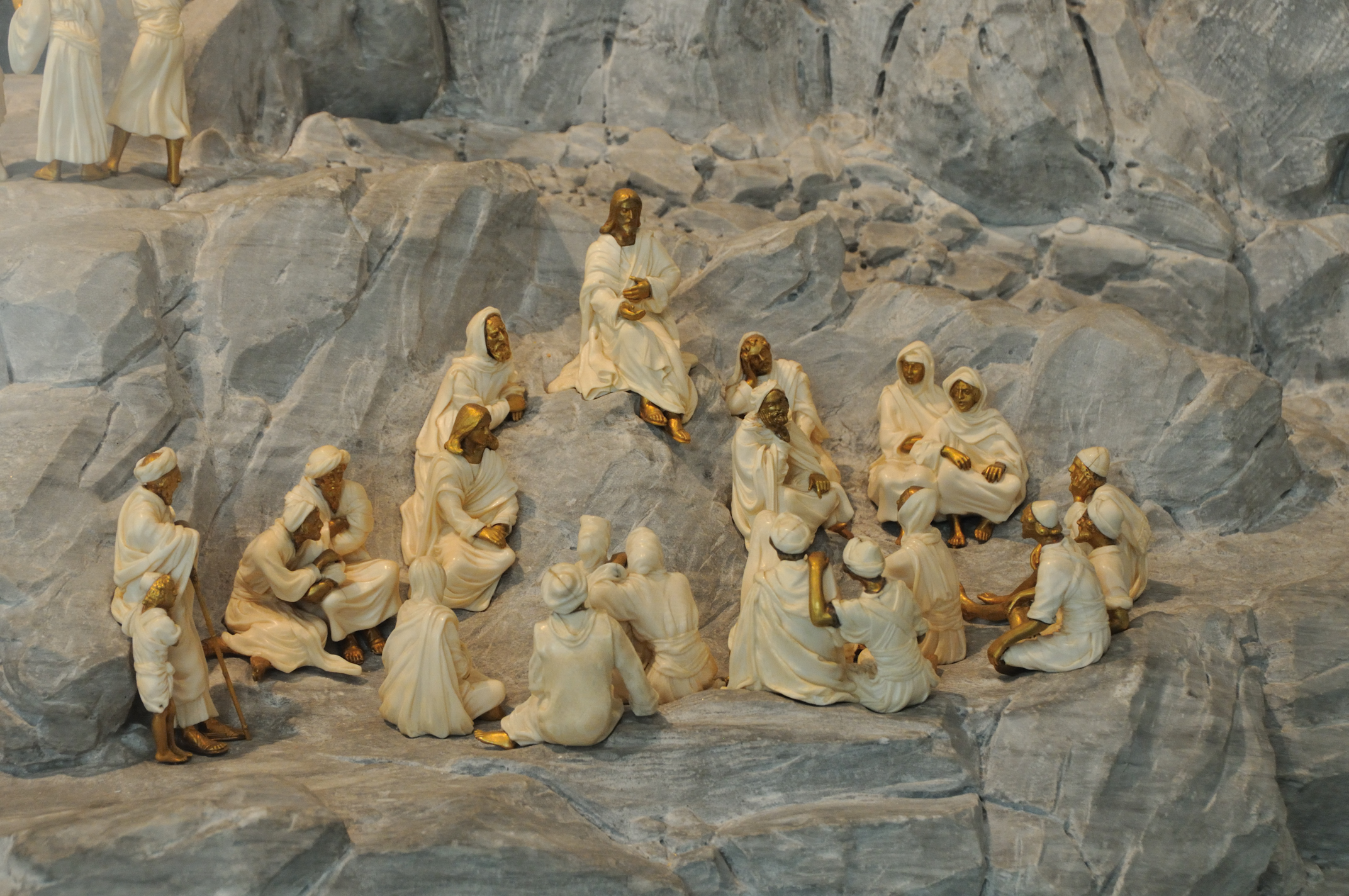
- "Sermont on the Mount", Via Vitae, by Joseph Chaumet (1852-1928), musée eucharistique du Hiéron, Paray-le-Monial, Saône-et-Loire, France.
- Book: Gospel of Matthew
- Christian Bible part: New Testament

Matthew 7:9 is the ninth verse of the seventh chapter of the Gospel of Matthew in the New Testament and is part of the Sermon on the Mount. This verse presents the first of a pair of metaphors explaining the benefits of prayer.

== Content ==
In the King James Version of the Bible the text reads:

Or what man is there of you, whom if his
son ask bread, will he give him a stone?

The World English Bible translates the passage as:

Or who is there among you, who, if his son
asks him for bread, will give him a stone?

The Novum Testamentum Graece text is:

ἢ τίς ἐστιν ἐξ ὑμῶν ἄνθρωπος,
ὃν αἰτήσει ὁ υἱὸς αὐτοῦ ἄρτον, μὴ λίθον ἐπιδώσει αὐτῷ;

For a collection of other versions see here: Matthew 7:9

== Analysis ==
"Who is there among you" is a phrase that also appears at Matthew 6:27. Nolland notes that it is Matthew's device for introducing an appeal to human experience. Bread was the basic food stuff of the people in Palestine of this era. Rocks were, as today, considered valueless. The basic metaphor of this verse is that a human father would not refuse a basic desire from his son, so God too would not refuse a basic need of one of his followers. This verse makes quite explicit the common Christian metaphor of God as the father to his followers. This metaphor also implies that while God will meet basic needs, there is no basis for expecting extravagances. If asked which father would turn down his son's request for a Ferrari the answer would be most.

Fowler notes that rocks and bread previously appeared as part of the temptation narrative in Matthew 4:3, where Satan told Jesus to relieve his hunger by turning a stone into bread. Jesus refused Satan, and was later provided for by God. As he implies all people will be if they have faith in him. Morris notes that the small round loaves of bread that were standard in this era may very well have looked like stones, and this may explain why they are often linked.

== Commentary from the Church Fathers ==
Augustine: As above He had cited the birds of the air and the lilies of the field, that our hopes may rise from the less to the greater; so also does He in this place, when He says, Or what man among you?

Pseudo-Chrysostom: Lest perchance anyone considering how great is the difference between God and man, and weighing his own sins should despair of obtaining, and so never take in hand to ask; therefore He proposes a comparison of the relation between father and son; that should we despair because of our sins, we may hope because of God's fatherly goodness.

Chrysostom: There are two things behoveful for one that prays; that he ask earnestly; and that he ask such things as he ought to ask. And those are spiritual things; as Solomon, because he asked such things as were right, received speedily.

Preceded by Matthew 7:8	Gospel of Matthew; Chapter 7	Succeeded by Matthew 7:10
