= The Kids Praise Album! =

Studio album by Debby Kerner & Ernie Rettino
- Released: 1980
- Genre: Children's music, Christian music
- Label: Maranatha! Music

The Kids Praise Album!, also known as Kids' Praise! 1: An Explosion of Happiness, is an American 1980 Maranatha! children's Christian music album that features Psalty the Singing Songbook. It is the very first album in a long-running series of Kids Praise! and other Psalty related albums. The album was written by Debby Kerner & Ernie Rettino (Mr. Rettino plays Psalty). This album has been credited to "The Maranatha! Kids" and to "The Kids' Praise! Kids".

== Track listing and plot ==
Some children hear weeping, and discover that it is coming from a children's songbook. The book is discovered to be alive and to be named Psalty, and to be upset because nobody will sing his music. The children proceed to cheer Psalty up by singing ten of his songs as Psalty teaches them about praise.

1. "Amen Praise the Lord"
2. "Behold What Manner of Love"
3. "Jesus, Name Above All Names"
4. "The Butterfly Song" (If I Were a Butterfly)
5. "Seek Ye First"
6. "Heaven is a Wonderful Place"
7. "I John 4:7-8 (Beloved)"
8. "The Wa Wa Song"
9. "Father I Adore You"
10. "Children of the Lord"
