= Christmas Memories (Evie album) =

Compilation album by Evie
- Released: 1987
- Recorded: 1977, 1984, 1987
- Studio: Whitefield Studios, Santa Ana, California
- Genre: Contemporary Christian, Christmas
- Length: 1:03:59
- Label: Word Records
- Producer: Greg Nelson, Lennart Sjöholm, Pelle Karlsson

Evie chronology
When All Is Said And Done (1986)	Christmas Memories (1987)	Celebrate the Family (1990)

Professional ratings
Review scores
Source	Rating
AllMusic	3/5 stars

Christmas Memories is a 1987 compilation Christmas album by Christian singer Evie released on Word Records. It is a collection of Christmas songs that Evie has recorded from her two Christmas albums Come On, Ring Those Bells (1977) and Christmas, A Happy Time (1984), plus she has recorded four new songs for this collection. The songs from Come On, Ring Those Bells were remixed and remastered by Greg Nelson and Jim Scheffler. Christmas Memories debuted and peaked at number 17 on the Billboard Top Inspirational Albums chart.

== Track listing ==
No.	Title	Writer(s)	Original album	Length
1.	"Come On, Ring Those Bells" (*)	Andrew Culverwell	Come On, Ring Those Bells	3:02
2.	"Christmas is Especially (For Those Who Love the Lord)" (***)	Pelle Karlsson	New recording	3:25
3.	"Come, Adore" (***)	Dick and Melodie Tunney	New recording	2:10
4.	"Peace on Earth" (***)	Greg Nelson, Phil McHugh	New recording	5:30
5.	"Away in a Manger" (*)	Traditional; arranged by Lennart Sjöholm	Come On, Ring Those Bells	2:37
6.	"Mary's Boy Child" (*)	Jester Hairston	Come On, Ring Those Bells	2:45
7.	"O Little Town of Bethlehem" (**)	Phillips Brooks	Christmas, A Happy Time	3:30
8.	"A Thousand Candles" (*)	Traditional; arranged by L. Sjöholm	Come On, Ring Those Bells	2:39
9.	"Move Me Closer (A Shepherd's Prayer)" (***)	Jon Mohr, Luanne Mohr	New recording	4:25
10.	"The First Noel/Joy to the World" (**)	Arranged by Clifford Robertson	Christmas, A Happy Time	3:45
11.	"Christmas, A Happy Time" (**)	P. Karlsson	Christmas, A Happy Time	2:15
12.	"Hark! The Herald Angels Sing" (**)	William H. Cummings, Felix Mendelssohn, Charles Wesley	Christmas, A Happy Time	2:50
13.	"No Room/Have You Any Room for Jesus?" (*)	John W. Peterson/C.C. Williams; arranged by L. Sjöholm	Come On, Ring Those Bells	3:42
14.	"A Tiny Baby" (**)	C. Robertson, Carter Robertson	Christmas, A Happy Time	3:00
15.	"O Holy Night" (*)	Adolphe Adam, John Sullivan Dwight	Come On, Ring Those Bells	3:45
16.	"O Come, O Come Emmanuel" (**)	Traditional; arranged by C. Robertson	Christmas, A Happy Time	2:45
17.	"Shiloh Has Come" (**)	C. Robertson, C. Robertson	Christmas, A Happy Time	3:40
18.	"O Come, All Ye Faithful" (**)	John Francis Wade	Christmas, A Happy Time	4:20
19.	"Silent Night" (*)	Franz X. Gruber, Joseph Mohr	Come On, Ring Those Bells	3:34

Note: (*) - tracks produced by Lennart Sjöholm; (**) - tracks produced by Pelle Karlsson; (***) - tracks produced by Greg Nelson.

== Charts ==
Chart (1989)	Peak position
US Top Inspirational Albums (Billboard)	17
