= Dorothy Vernell Simmons =

American singer

- Born: 1910; Powhatan, Louisiana, United States
- Died: 1996 (aged 85–86)
- Genre: Gospel
- Occupation: Singer
- Formerly of: Simmons-Akers Singers

Dorothy Vernell Simmons (1910–1996) was the founder and singer for the Los Angeles–based Gospel act the Simmons-Akers Singers.

== Biography ==
Simmons was born in Powhatan, Louisiana, in 1910. Her family moved to Chicago when Simmons was seven year old. After she graduated from high school she went to work for the Martin and Morris Music Company. In 1940 Simmons became a member of the Sallie Martin Singers. She moved to Los Angeles in 1947.

In 1948, she and Doris Akers (1923–1995) formed the Simmons-Akers Singers. Their music played a part in the expanding Los Angeles gospel movement and emphasized melody and a smooth sound. Simmons sang soprano and Akers sang mezzo-soprano-alto.

Simmons died in 1996.
