= Manfred Siebald =

- Born: Manfred Siebald; 1948 (age 77–78)
- Origin: Germany
- Genres: Pop
- Occupations: Singer-songwriter, university professor
- Years active: 1970 –
- Website: http://www.siebald.org/

Manfred Siebald (born 26 October 1948 at Alheim-Baumbach) is a German singer-songwriter and lecturer in American studies in Mainz.

Siebald is best known as a Christian singer-songwriter, who writes and speaks on contemporary worship music. His songs of the genre Neues Geistliches Lied (NGL) have gained a firm place in the songbooks of many different Christian denominations and are sung in fellowships and youth groups throughout Germany.

== Artistic and musical career ==
As a child Manfred Siebald learned to play several musical instruments, including the violin, the viola and the piano. Along with his studies at the University of Marburg he took instruction in harmonisation and singing. As early as 1970 he was conducting the Youth for Christ Choir and singing in the Christ Singers. He also brought out his first single – "Meinst du wirklich, es genügt?" – at that time. In 1972 he published his first solo album, entitled Da steh ich nun. Siebald gained an international following with his performances at Eurofest '75, the international youth conference and evangelistic crusade which was organized by the Billy Graham organisation in Brussels. Siebald has often been compared with the singer-songwriter Reinhard Mey for his style, and sometimes with Graham Kendrick for his influence on Christian music in his country.

Over time he has become the most well-known German Christian singer songwriter, and has influenced many others. This is demonstrated, among other things, by the release of the album In deinem Haus – A Tribute to Manfred Siebald in 2003, consisting of reinterpretations of some of Siebald's best-loved songs by other well-known Christian musicians (such as Michael Janz^{de} from the group Beatbetrieb^{de}). The album was arranged by Florian Sitzmann^{de} and produced by Arne Kopfermann^{de}.

Siebald also translates English songs and writes lyrics for other singers. For example, he wrote all the lyrics for Cae Gauntt's^{de} album Welt von 1000 Wegen. He is frequently asked to write a theme song for special meetings or conferences. This was the case when he wrote "Von deinen Worten können wir leben" (We Can Live Off Your Words) for The Year of the Bible in 1992. To date Siebald has penned about 350 songs, produced 19 albums and published seven poetry books.

Manfred Siebald performs about thirty concerts annually, accompanying himself on various acoustic guitars. For this he travels all over Germany and abroad. For his concerts abroad, including the US, South Africa, and Sri Lanka, he has produced English versions of his songs.

== Academic career ==
In 1967, Siebald graduated from secondary school in Kassel. While on tour in America with the German Youth for Christ Choir, he studied at Manchester College, North Manchester, Indiana, in 1969. He then read German and English philology at Philipps University of Marburg. He trained to be a secondary school teacher of English and German, taking his first state diploma examination in 1972. After his marriage in 1973, he paused his studies for three years, completing his teacher training by taking the second state examination in 1976.

In 1977, he did a PhD in American studies at the Johannes Gutenberg University of Mainz. His dissertation dealt with the topic Auflehnung im Werk Herman Melvilles – Rebellion in Herman Melville's Novels. In 1983, he was made assistant professor (tenured) for American studies at Johannes Gutenberg University and continued his academic work after completion of his PhD. He interrupted his work at Mainz by taking sabbaticals at Wheaton College (Illinois) (Clyde S. Kilby Professor in 1992) and guest professor at Georgia State University in Atlanta (1996 and 1997). In the first year (1996), Siebald produced the monograph Der verlorene Sohn in der amerikanischen Literatur – The Prodigal Son in American Literature – which was published in 2003. He was made associate professor in American studies in Mainz in 2002 and has remained there to the present.

== Other activities ==
Manfred Siebald is curator of the Faith and Science Institute of the Studentenmission in Deutschland (SMD), the German equivalent of the Universities and Colleges Christian Fellowship (UCCF). In 1979, the nationwide television special "Whether My Songs Are Loud or Soft" was broadcast about his work. The same year, he co-founded the Christian arts group Das Rad (The Wheel) in Wetzlar, together with about 50 other Christians also working in the arts.

He is married to a doctor, Christine Siebald (née Stossberg), and they have a son, Benjamin, born in 1984.

In 2008, President Horst Köhler awarded him and his wife the Federal Cross of Merit for their tireless charity work both at home and abroad.

== Music ==
=== Popular songs ===
- "Ins Wasser fällt ein Stein" – "A Stone Drops in the Pond", original text ("It only takes a spark") and music: Kurt Kaiser, his best-known song in the current German Protestant hymnal Evangelisches Gesangbuch (EG)
- "Geh unter der Gnade", in EG
- "Es geht ohne Gott in die Dunkelheit" – "It's dark without God"
- "In Deinem Haus" – "In your house, Lord"
- "Jesus, zu dir kann ich so kommen wie ich bin" – "I can come to you, Jesus, just as I am" (music: Johannes Nitsch, sung every evening of the ProChrist crusade.)
- "Gut, dass wir einander haben" – "It's good that we've got each other" (song about the advantages of Christian fellowship)
- "Friede sei mit dir" – "Peace be with thee" (benediction)
- "Du bist mein Rabe" – "You are my raven" (love song)
- "Über Nacht" – "Over night" (song about the fall of the Berlin Wall and German reunification 1989/90)
- "Mit federleichter Hand" – "With a Soft Touch" (love song)
- "Wenn der Mund stumm ist" – "If I hold my tongue" (song about the September 11, 2001 attacks)
- "Die Weihnachtsfreude" – "Christmas joy" (a well-known carol, used as the theme tune for the cartoon Die Stadt, die Weihnachten vergaß – The Town That Forgot Christmas)
- "Wenn wir Gott in der Höhe ehren" – "If we glorify God in the Highest" (Christmas carol)

=== Discography ===
==== Single ====
- "Meinst du wirklich, es genügt?" (1970)
  Do you really mean, it's enough?"

==== Vinyl albums ====
- Da steh ich nun (1972)
  Here I stand
- Ich gehe weiter (1974)
  I'll press on
- Das ungedüngte Feld (1976)
  A Field of organic food
  see: discussion
- Zeitpunkte (1978)
  Points in Time
- Überall hat Gott seine Leute (1983) ("Manfred Siebald and Friends")
  God has his people everywhere
  The title comes from Manfred's translation of Andrae Crouch's song "Through it all".
- Kreuzschnabel (1985)
  Crossbill
- Alles auf seine Weise – Liebeslieder (1986)
  Everything in its own way – Love songs

==== Compact discs ====
- Gib mir die richtigen Worte (1987) (Sampler)
  Words that are wise and yet simple
  see: discussion
- Spuren (1988)
  Traces
- Von Wegen (1991)
  No Way
- Amasement
  (Instrumentals arranged by Tom Keene)
- Du bist mein Rabe – Lieder von der Liebe (1993)
  You are my raven – Love songs
- Worte wie Brot – Lieder für den Gottesdienst (1994) ("Manfred Siebald and friends")
  Words like bread – Worship songs
- Lass uns Freunde sein (Songs for children)(1996) ("Manfred Siebald and children")
  Let's Be Friends
- Nicht vergessen (1998)
  Not Forgotten
- Weltbewegende Winzigkeiten (2000)
  Little Things That Make the World Go Round
- Was die Engel uns sagen (2000) ("Manfred Siebald and friends") – Songs for Christmas
  What the angels tell us
- Vielleicht kommst du mit (2001)
  Maybe you'll come along
- Morgenmantelmorgen (2004)
  Dressing Gown Morning
- Singen Sie bald mit? (2005) (Sampler) Manfred Siebald's congregational songs
  Will you sing along?
- Ich lass dich nicht fallen (2006)
  I won't let you fall
- Aber Sicher (2008) But Surely
- Das Beste kommt noch (2010) The Best Is Yet to Come
- Manfred Siebald - Live (2010)
- Höchste Zeit (2013) High Time
- Zur Feier des Tages (2017) Celebrating the Day
- The first four vinyl albums have been re-released on compact disc as a 4-CD pack.

== Publications ==
For an extensive list of the academic publications see

=== Poetry books ===
- Ist schon alles gesagt (1976) Poetry collection Has Everything Been Said?
- Worauf noch warten (1980) Poetry collection Why Wait
- Kreuzschnabel (1983) Poetry collection Crossbill (with woodcuts by Andreas Felger^{de})
- Wir brauchen Mut (1992) Poetry collection We Need Courage
- Lehn dich zurück (1992) Poetry collection Lean Back
- Von den Augen abgelesen (1993) Book of poetry Read My Eyes
- Du bist mein Rabe (1993) Book of poetry You Are my Raven (with Christine Siebald)

=== Other books ===
- Auflehnung im Werk Herman Melvilles — Rebellion in Herman Melville's Novels (1979) (dissertation)
- Eine Handvoll schöner Gedanken Collection of aphorisms – A handful of beautiful thoughts (1985)
- Das Leben ist eine Boulebahn – Life is a bowling alley (2003)
  ISBN 3-417-24724-1
- Der verlorene Sohn in der amerikanischen Literatur – The prodigal son in American literature (2003)
  ISBN 3-8253-1302-6 (Monograph)
- Die ganze Weite: Ein Amerika-Lesebuch. – The big picture: An American primer (2004)
  ISBN 3-87630-525-X
- Gib mir den richtigen Ton. Lauter Liedergeschichten – Give me the right sound. Stories of famous songs (2006)
  ISBN 3-7751-4355-6
- Dorothy L. Sayers: Leben – Werk – Gedanken. – Her life, work and thoughts (2007)
  ISBN 978-3-937896-51-9
- Pitti lächelt und andere Geschichten – Pitti smiled and other stories (2008)
  ISBN 978-3-7655-1982-6

=== Articles ===
- Amerikanisierung des Dramas und Dramatisierung Amerikas – Americanisation of Drama and Dramatisation of America (1985)
  Marriage Studies by Hans Helmcke, contributions by Horst Immel and Manfred Siebald.
- "Salt of the Earth." Article in A Dictionary of Biblical Tradition in English Literature. David Lyle Jeffrey, general editor. Grand Rapids: W.B. Eerdmans, 1992.
  ISBN 0-8028-3634-8.
