= Seek Ye First =

Seek Ye First or Seek Ye First the Kingdom of God is a Christian song based on Matthew 6:33. It was written in 1971 by Karen Lafferty after a Bible study on the verse at Calvary Chapel, and has become one of the most familiar praise songs, included in many recent hymnals.

The original version only included a single verse with a refrain of alleluias, which can also be sung in canon with the verse. Other verses of anonymous authorship have been added based on Matthew 7:7 and Matthew 4:4. It is sometimes included in Christian children's song books.

== See also ==
- Jesus music
