= Matthew 7:10 =

- ← 7:9 7:11 →
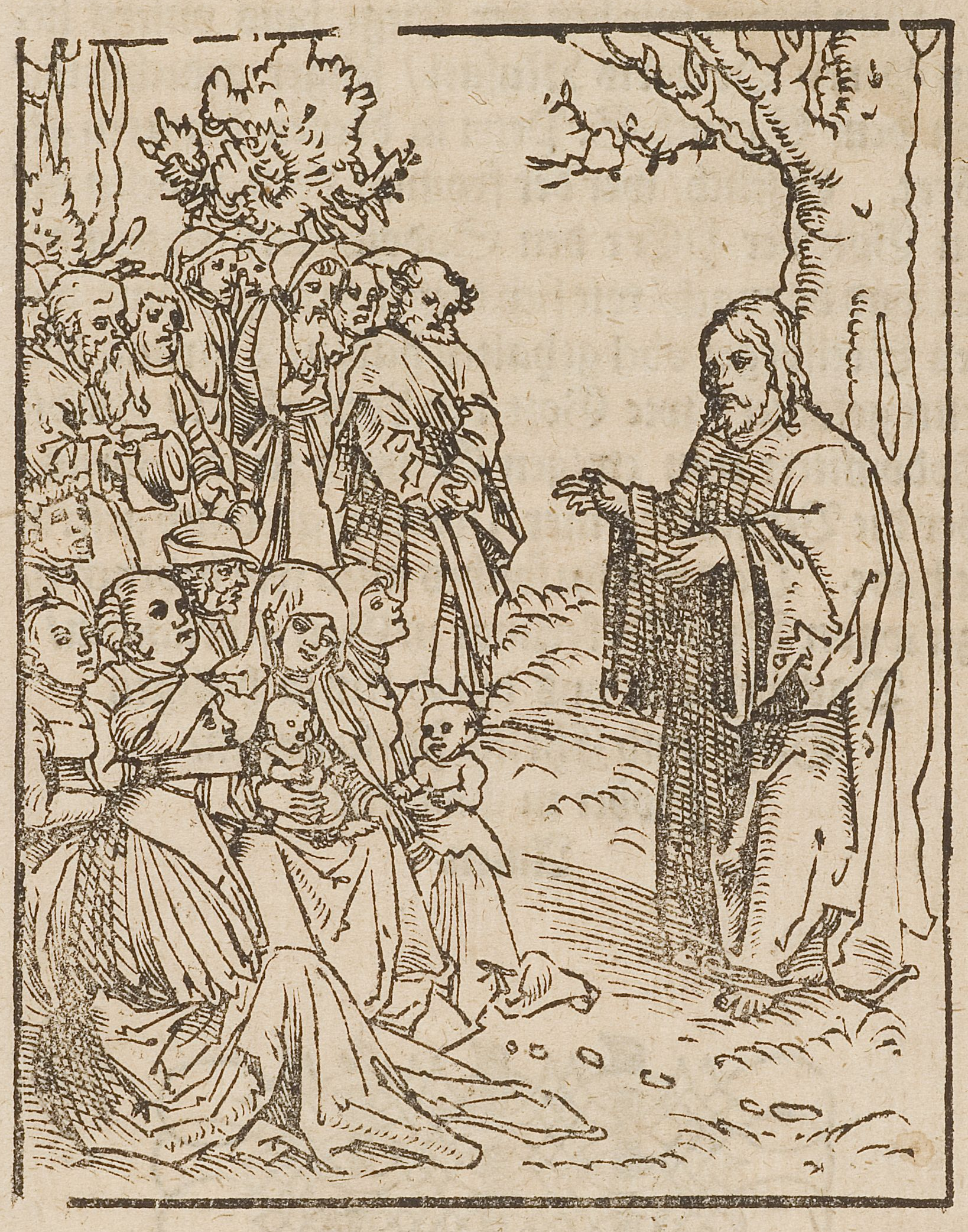
- "The Sermont on the Mount", woodcut by Lucas Cranach the Elder, from his "Passion Christ und Antichrist", Herzog Anton Ulrich-Museum, Braunschweig (1582).
- Book: Gospel of Matthew
- Christian Bible part: New Testament

Matthew 7:10 is the tenth verse of the seventh chapter of the Gospel of Matthew in the New Testament and is part of the Sermon on the Mount. This verse presents the second of a pair of metaphors explaining the benefits of prayer.

== Content ==
In the King James Version of the Bible the text reads:

Or if he ask a fish, will he give him a serpent?

The World English Bible translates the passage as:

Or if he asks for a fish, who will give him a serpent?

The Novum Testamentum Graece text is:

ἢ καὶ ἰχθὺν αἰτήσει, μὴ ὄφιν ἐπιδώσει αὐτῷ;

For a collection of other versions see BibleHub Matthew 7:10

== Analysis ==
The first comparison was bread and stones, this second one has the same metaphor but with a different pair of objects. The basic metaphor of this verse, as with the previous one is that a human father would not refuse a basic desire from his son, so God too would not refuse a basic need of one of his followers, when they ask him. Second to bread, fish would have been the main food source for the communities around the Sea of Galilee where Jesus was preaching, and fish and fishing metaphors appear a number of times in the New Testament. As with stones and loaves, fish and snakes are somewhat similar in appearance. Both are long thin scaled creatures. A dried fish may look like snakeskin. France notes that a common catch in the Lake of Galilee was the eel-like Clarias lazera, a type of catfish, which looks very much like a snake. Unlike rocks, which were of little use but inoffensive, snakes were considered a dangerous, evil creature and positively harmful. A snake is the form of the tempter in Genesis, and other negative snake metaphors appear in the New Testament. This metaphor is thus somewhat stronger than the previous one.

In Luke there is a third metaphor of a scorpion and an egg, which does not continue the pattern of similar appearances. This metaphor does not appear in Matthew.

== Commentary from the Church Fathers ==
Pseudo-Chrysostom: And what are the things that we ought to ask, he shows under the likeness of a loaf, and a fish. The loaf is the word concerning the knowledge of God the Father. The stone is all falsehood that has a stumbling-block of offence to the soul.

Saint Remigius: By the fish we may understand the word concerning Christ, by the serpent the Devil himself. Or by the loaf may be understood spiritual doctrine; by the stone ignorance; by the fish the water of Holy Baptism; by the serpent the wiles of the Devil, or unbelief.

Rabanus Maurus: Or; bread which is the common food signifies charity, without which the other virtues are of no avail. The fish signifies faith, which is born of the water of baptism, is tossed in the midst of the waves of this life and yet lives. Luke adds a third thing, an egg, (Luke 11:12.) which signifies hope; for an egg is the hope of the animal. To charity, He opposes a stone, that is, the hardness of hatred; to faith, a serpent, that is, the venom of treachery; to hope, a scorpion, that is, despair, which stings backward, as the scorpion.

Saint Remigius: The sense therefore is; we need not fear that should we ask of God our Father bread, that is doctrine or love, He will give us a stone; that is, that He will suffer our heart to be contracted either by the frost of hatred or by hardness of soul; or that when we ask for faith, He will suffer us to die of the poison of unbelief. Thence it follows, If then ye being evil.

== Sources ==
- France, R.T. The Gospel According to Matthew: an Introduction and Commentary. Leicester: Inter-Varsity, 1985.

Preceded by Matthew 7:9	Gospel of Matthew; Chapter 7	Succeeded by Matthew 7:11
