= Matthew 7:11 =

- ← 7:10 7:12 →
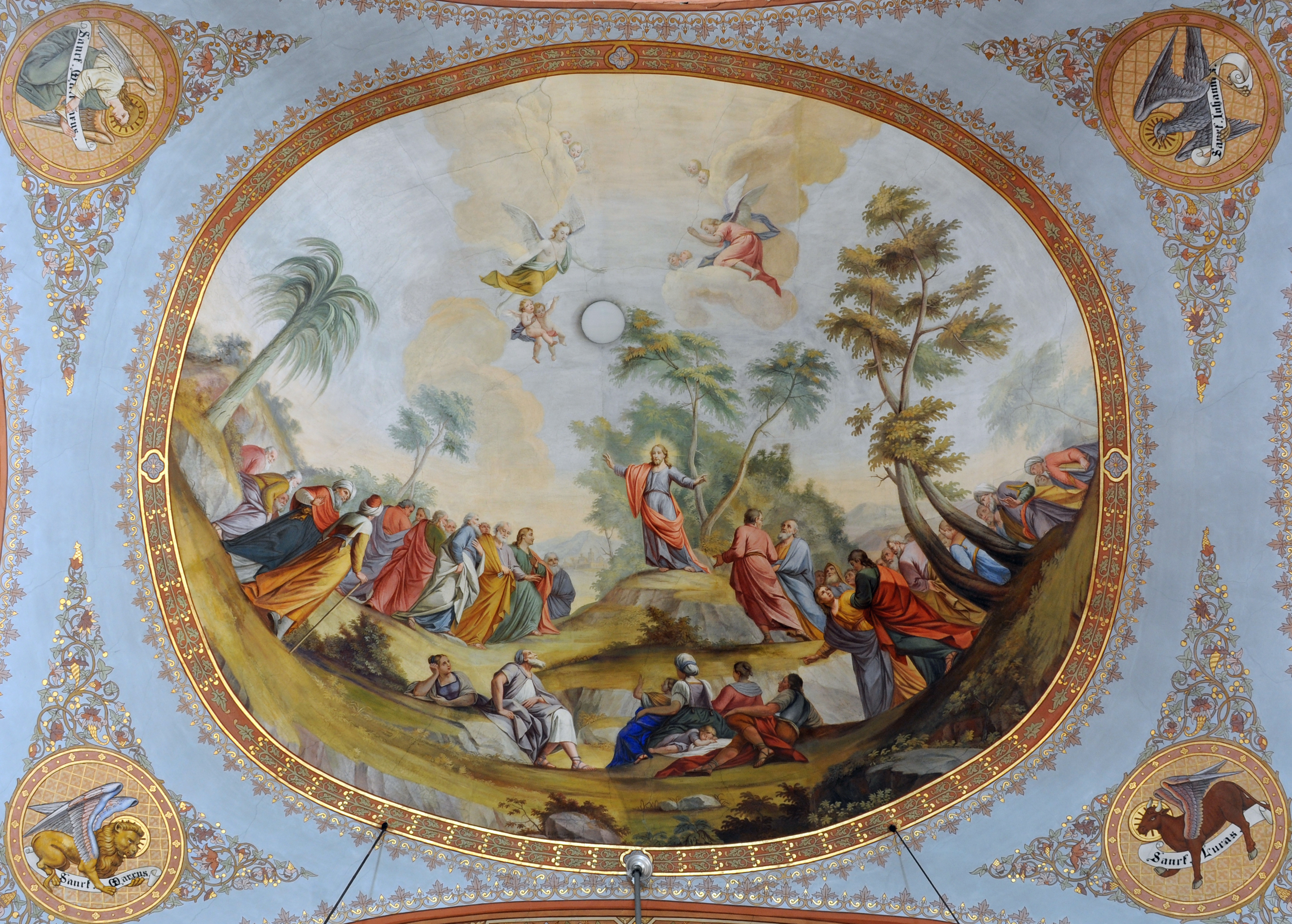
- "The Sermon of Jesus on the mount". Fresco by Franz Xaver Kirchebner in the Parish church of St. Ulrich in Gröden-it:Ortisei (late 18th century).
- Book: Gospel of Matthew
- Christian Bible part: New Testament

Matthew 7:11 is the eleventh verse of the seventh chapter of the Gospel of Matthew in the New Testament and is part of the Sermon on the Mount. This verse summarizes the preceding metaphors in favour of prayer.

== Text ==
In the King James Version of the Bible the text reads:

If ye then, being evil, know how to give good gifts
unto your children, how much more shall your Father which
is in heaven give good things to them that ask him?

The World English Bible translates the passage as:

If you then, being evil, know how to give good gifts
to your children, how much more will your Father who
is in heaven give good things to those who ask him!

The Novum Testamentum Graece text is:

εἰ οὖν ὑμεῖς πονηροὶ ὄντες οἴδατε δόματα ἀγαθὰ διδόναι
τοῖς τέκνοις ὑμῶν, πόσῳ μᾶλλον
ὁ Πατὴρ ὑμῶν ὁ ἐν τοῖς οὐρανοῖς δώσει ἀγαθὰ τοῖς αἰτοῦσιν αὐτόν.

For a collection of other versions see BibleHub Matthew 7:11

== Interpretation ==
The previous two verses presented a pair of observations which showed how a human father would not callously mistreat his own child. This verse extends the same observations to God's response to prayer. If a flawed human father looks out for his own child, then there is no reason to doubt that the perfectly good God will not have the best interest of his followers in heart.

According to this verse, Jesus calls his hearers Greek: Πονηροὶ, poneroi, "evil". Jesus was here speaking to his disciples, and others who had chosen to follow him, far from the most reprehensible part of society. The text is unambiguous, the word here translated as evil is the same one routinely used to describe Satan himself. Heinrich Meyer suggests that the meaning is that his hearers, "as compared with God, are morally evil". and Harold Fowler also suggests that Jesus might simply mean that all humans are evil when compared to the perfection of God.

Jesus here presents no arguments for man's evil nature: he appears to take it as a "given". This is true throughout the New Testament, the essentially evil nature of humanity is simply assumed. Theologian Eduard Schweizer notes that this passage is somewhat hopeful, as even the inherently evil man will in some situations almost always do good.

God will give good things to those who ask him. In Luke's Gospel, the parallel text has God giving the Holy Spirit to those who ask, but David Hill suggests that Matthew's wording is likely to have been closer to the original. The reference to good things might be linked to the idea that God will only give good gifts, that if you ask for something that will end up harming you God will not provide it. Ulrich Luz disagrees with this view, and argues that this reading would contradict the thrust of this group of verses.

== Commentary from the Church Fathers ==
Chrysostom: This He said not detracting from human nature, nor confessing the whole human race to be evil; but He calls paternal love evil when compared with His own goodness. Such is the superabundance of His love towards men.

Pseudo-Chrysostom: Because in comparison of God who is preeminently good, all men seem to be evil, as all light shows dark when compared with the sun.

Jerome: Or perhaps he called the Apostles evil, in their person condemning the whole human race, whose heart is set to evil from his infancy, as we read in Genesis. Nor is it any wonder that He should call this generation evil, (Gen. 8:22.) as the Apostle also speaks, Seeing the days are evil.

Augustine: Or; He calls evil (Eph. 5:16.) those who are lovers of this age; whence also the good things which they give are to be called good according to their sense who esteem them as good; nay, even in the nature of things they are goods, that is, temporal goods, and such as pertain to this weak life.

Augustine: For that good thing which makes men good is God. Gold and silver are good things not as making you good, but as with them you may do good. If then we be evil, yet as having a Father who is good let us not remain ever evil.

Augustine: If then we being evil, know how to give that which is asked of us, how much more is it to be hoped that God will give us good things when we ask Him?

Pseudo-Chrysostom: He says good things, because God does not give all things to them that ask Him, but only good things.

Glossa Ordinaria: For from God we receive only such things as are good, of what kind soever they may seem to us when we receive them; for all things work together for good to His beloved.

Saint Remigius: And be it known that where Matthew says, He shall give good things, Luke has, shall give his Holy Spirit. (Luke 11:13.) But this ought not to seem contrary, because all the good things which man receives from God, are given by the grace of the Holy Spirit.

Preceded by Matthew 7:10	Gospel of Matthew; Chapter 7	Succeeded by Matthew 7:12
