= Marsha Stevens =

American Christian musician

Marsha Stevens-Pino
- Born: Marsha Carter; August 20, 1952 (age 74)
- Origin: Pomona, California, U.S.
- Genres: Jesus music, Contemporary Christian Music
- Occupations: Singer, songwriter, recording artist
- Instruments: Piano, guitar
- Years active: 1969–present
- Labels: Maranatha! Music, BALM
- Website: www.balmministries.net

Marsha Stevens-Pino (nee Carter) is an American Christian singer, musician, songwriter and recording artist.

== Early music career ==
Shortly after becoming a Christian as a sixteen year old high school student in 1969, Marsha Carter wrote the song "For Those Tears I Died (Come to the Water)". Taking the advice of her school's choir director, she copyrighted the song. For Those Tears I Died eventually became widely known and sung by Christian youth groups and churches across the United States. Over time, it was included in Christian songbooks as well as church hymnals.

As Carter further utilized her musical and songwriting talents with sister Wendy Carter and friends Peter Jacobs and Russ Stevens, the group formed the Jesus music group "Children of the Day". The group played regularly at their home church, Calvary Chapel in Costa Mesa, California, and made appearances at other churches in Southern California. As their popularity and what was known as the Jesus movement grew, Children of the Day sought to record an album of their music. After borrowing $900 for the project from their pastor, Chuck Smith, Carter and her bandmates recorded Come to the Waters; the album included songs she penned along with the others in the group. The album was released in 1971 on the Maranatha! Music label. More albums by the group followed, along with the individual band members making appearances on other Maranatha! projects such as The Praise Album in 1974.

Prior to the release of Come to the Waters, Marsha Carter and bandmate Russ Stevens married, with Carter taking Stevens' last name.

Because of the widespread distribution and success of For Those Tears I Died, Stevens received an entry in the Encyclopedia of Contemporary Christian Music. In it, her impact on the early Jesus Music scene is recognized, with Stevens being referred to as "The Mother of Contemporary Christian Music".

== Personal life and later music career ==
Stevens' marriage to Russ Stevens lasted for seven years; together, they had two children. Support of her music and Children of the Day by their pastor, Chuck Smith, ended when the Stevens marriage ended. In her later-written memoir, Stevens stated Smith insisted Children of the Day be headed by one of the male band members and that after she revealed publicly she was a lesbian in 1981, Smith cut ties with her. Stevens further stated in the book that Smith suggested she had not "married the right man."

In the divorce, the judge awarded Marsha Stevens half the royalties of all her songs, as well as custody of their children. Stevens continued to live and raise her children in Southern California and became a registered nurse.

After coming out publicly as a lesbian following her divorce, Stevens faced severe criticism from Christians, churches, and the Christian music industry. Her songs were torn from hymnals and songbooks with the torn pages sent to her in the mail.

Never feeling she was no longer a Christian after coming out, Stevens joined the predominantly gay and lesbian Metropolitan Community Church (MCC) in Los Angeles in 1984. Becoming involved in that church's music ministry, she continued to write music and began touring with a group from the MCC as well as doing solo concerts. Stevens' concerts were often held at other MCC churches around the country in addition to independent churches with predominantly gay and lesbian congregations. It was during this time period in the 1980s that Stevens formed BALM, "Born Again Lesbian Music"; the ministry being the label under which she started recording her music.

In 2002, Marsha and Cindy Stevens-Pino attended a concert in Phoenix, featuring Bill Gaither and his wife Gloria, along with his Homecoming singers. During the concert, Gaither recognized Stevens being in the audience, as well as her contribution to the beginnings of Contemporary Christian Music. Following the concert, Stevens-Pino and her then-girlfriend met backstage with Gaither and singer Mark Lowry, having their picture taken together. The photo was published on social media and became a source of controversy for Gaither with Christians who did not endorse homosexuality. In a later official written statement, Gaither distanced himself from any association with her and stated:

...a visit by Marsha Stevens to a Gaither Homecoming concert in 2002 is being misrepresented and misused by her and others. Marsha Stevens is an outspoken lesbian singer-songwriter who operates an organization called Born Again Lesbian Music (BALM Ministries). Her story is a sad one.

Gaither's official statement continued, to include accusing Stevens-Pino of exploiting their backstage meeting for publicity.

In 2003, Stevens and Cindy Pino married that August. and changed their last names to "Stevens-Pino". After moving to Florida, they created a music ministry training school for LGBT+ Christians out of King of Peace Metropolitan Community Church in St. Petersburg. Together they lead BALM Ministries and attend Pass-a-Grille Community Church.

Stevens-Pino, along with her sister Wendy Carter Fremin, are seen in the archive film footage of a scene at the end of the 2023 Lionsgate film, Jesus Revolution. The scene shows one of the many en masse baptisms in the Pacific Ocean sponsored by Calvary Chapel. In the footage, both Stevens-Pino and her sister are seen singing and playing guitars as part of a baptism service at Corona del Mar State Beach in Newport Beach, California.

== Albums ==
- Songs of Praise in a Strange Land
- Is this the real you?
- In Retrospect
- The Waiting's Over
- The Gift is on the inside
- UP (Unashamed Praise)
- I Will Not Behave Like Prey
- I Found You
- You Called Us Good
