= Geh unter der Gnade =

German Christian hymn

- Christian hymn
- English: Go under the mercy
- Written: 1987
- Text: by Manfred Siebald
- Language: German
- Melody: by Siebald

"Geh unter der Gnade" (Go under the mercy) is a Christian hymn in German with text and music by Manfred Siebald, written in 1987. It is a hymn of the genre Neues Geistliches Lied (NGL), appearing in the Protestant Evangelisches Gesangbuch, and in many songbooks. The first verse begins "Alte Stunden, alte Tage" (Old hours, old days).

== History ==
Manfred Siebald wrote the German text and the music of "Geh unter der Gnade" in 1987, first as a birthday greeting for the 60th birthday of the publisher Friedrich Hänssler, trying to translate the greeting "Go under the mercy" into German. It is a hymn of the genre Neues Geistliches Lied (NGL), that appeared in the Protestant hymnal Evangelisches Gesangbuch, as EG 543, and in many songbooks.
