= Bettenhausen =

Bettenhausen may refer to:

== Places ==
=== Germany ===
- Bettenhausen, Baden-Württemberg, in the Rottweil district, Baden-Württemberg
- Bettenhausen, Kassel, a district of the city Kassel, Hesse
- Bettenhausen, Lich, in the Lich, Hesse district
- Bettenhausen, Rhineland-Palatinate, in the Kusel district, Rhineland-Palatinate
- Bettenhausen, Thuringia, in the Schmalkalden-Meiningen district, Thuringia

=== Switzerland ===
- Bettenhausen, Switzerland, in the Canton of Bern

== People ==
- Gary Bettenhausen (1941–2014), American auto racing driver
- Merle Bettenhausen (1943–2026), American race car driver
- Tony Bettenhausen (1916–1961), American racing driver
- Tony Bettenhausen Jr. (1951–2000), American race car owner and driver

== See also ==
- HVM Racing#Bettenhausen Motorsports
- 1963 Tony Bettenhausen 200, the seventh round of the 1963 USAC Championship Car season
