= Mustard Seed Faith =

American Jesus music group

- Origin: Costa Mesa, California
- Genres: Jesus music, Christian rock
- Years active: 1970–77, 1980
- Label: Maranatha! Music

Mustard Seed Faith was an American Jesus music group from Costa Mesa, California.

Mustard Seed Faith was one of several groups formed by members of Calvary Chapel Costa Mesa in the late 1960s and early 1970s; others included Daniel Amos and Sweet Comfort Band. Mustard Seed Faith's first releases were songs on Maranatha! Music compilations: "Happy in Jesus", released in 1973 on Maranatha Three, "All I Know" in 1974 on Maranatha Four and "Sidney the Pirate" in 1976 on Maranatha Five. The group's only album for Maranatha, Sail On Sailor, was released in 1975 and featured album art by Rick Griffin.

The group toured extensively from 1970 to 1977. They disbanded in 1977 partly due to "road touring fatigue." They reunited in 1980 to independently issue a second full-length album. Members Oden Fong and Lewis McVay went on to pursue solo careers.

== Members ==
Earliest version

- Wade Link — guitar, vocals
- Pedro Buford — keyboards, flute, vocals
- Dan Leist — vocals, harmonica

Second version

- Pedro Buford
- Oden Fong — vocals, guitars
- Lewis McVay — vocals, drums & acoustic guitar
- John Belles — electric bass

Third version

- Lewis McVay — lead vocals, now playing guitar only
- Darrell Cook — electric bass
- Steve Berchtold — drums
- Pedro Buford
- Oden Fong

== Discography ==
- Sail On Sailor (Maranatha! Music, 1975)
1. "The Question"
2. "Let Go"
3. "Can't Work Your Way to Heaven"
4. "Once I Had a Dream"
5. "Dried Up Well"
6. "Sail On Sailor"
7. "Lighter Side of Darkness"
8. "Sweet Jesus Morning"
9. "More Than Sunlight"
10. "Back Home"
- Limited Edition (independent, 1980)
