= Culverwell Mesolithic Site =

Mesolithic settlement in England

Coordinates: 50.5232°N 2.4455°W

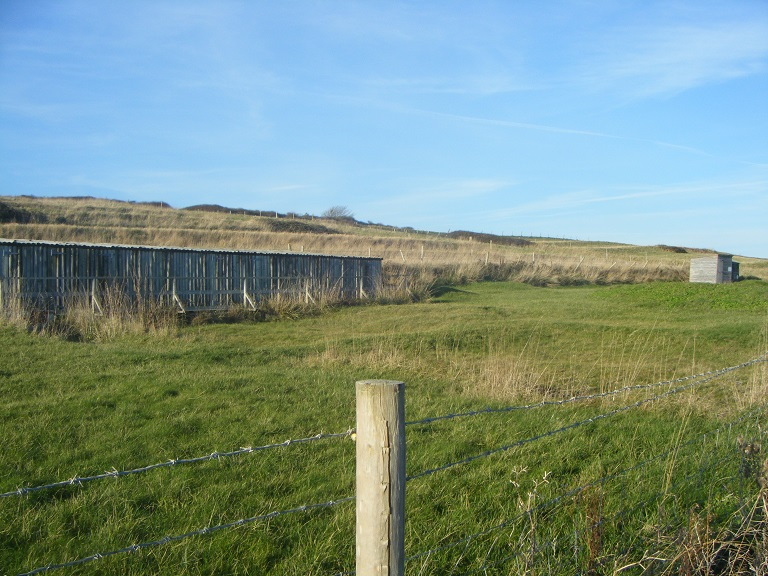
The Culverwell Mesolithic Site.

Culverwell Mesolithic Site is a Mesolithic settlement, located on the Isle of Portland, Dorset, England. It is found in the local area known as Culverwell, along the Portland Bill Road. It is within an area of unspoiled countryside, with no past quarrying. The site is maintained by the Association for Portland Archaeology – a small group dedicated to researching, investigating and excavating on Portland.

Open days have been held on the site, where guided tours take place of the preserved site, showing and explaining the visible remains and artefacts and how Mesolithic people lived. In 2004, the Culverwell Mesolithic Site won an archaeological award; the prestigious "Pitt Rivers Award", for developing this Mesolithic site on Portland.

The surrounding fields between the Bill and Southwell are made up of an ancient strip field system, once found all over the island before quarrying continued to destroy them. These particular fields remain untouched from housing or quarrying. Culverwell Mesolithic Site has become a scheduled monument under the Ancient Monuments and Archaeological Areas Act 1979.

== Background ==
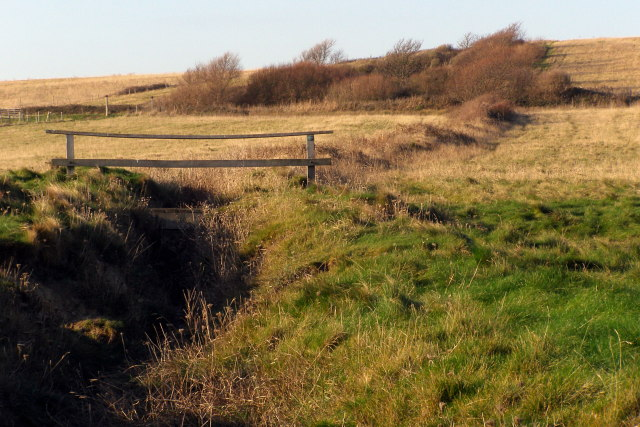
The Culverwell stream.

The site is said to be circa 7500-8500 years old. The site's main feature is the large floor of limestone slabs on top of a shell midden (rubbish dump). The floor is unique for this period and is also the earliest known structural evidence in England for the extensive use of Portland Jurassic limestone on a living site. Other features on the site include the remains of a low wall, four hearths, and a cooking pit. A ritual feature incorporated into the floor consisted of a sub-triangular stone with a large beach cobble next to it. Vast quantities of stone tools and the debris created during their production have been found on the site. The most common tools are microliths, scrapers, knives, chopping tools, pounders and picks. Pierced shell beads have also been found.

Some academics estimate that the total Mesolithic population of Britain never exceeded 5000, and it is likely that approximately 20 people lived on the site for at least 20-25 years in 4-5 stone huts. The occupants were possible semi-sedentary, and survived by gathering molluscs and edible plants with the addition of occasional meat. Water came from the nearby Culver Well, and the chert for the stone artefacts came from exposures in the cliffs. The edge of the sea was about 300–400 metres further out than it is presently. In November 1999, Archaeopress published the book Culverwell Mesolithic Habitation Site: Excavation Report and Research Studies, written by Susann Palmer. The book is part of the British Archaeological Reports (BAR).
