= Matthew 7:7–8 =

- ← 7:6 7:9 →
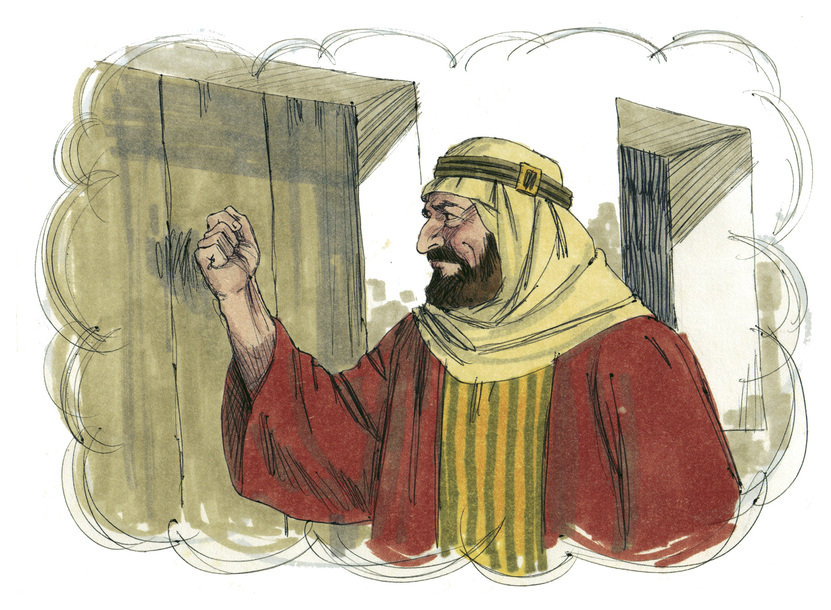
- Illustration for Matthew 7:7 "Knock, and it shall be opened unto you".
- Book: Gospel of Matthew
- Christian Bible part: New Testament

Matthew 7:7–8 are the seventh and eighth verses of the seventh chapter of the Gospel of Matthew in the New Testament and is part of the Sermon on the Mount. These verses begin an important metaphor generally believed to be about prayer.

== Content ==
In the King James Version of the Bible the text reads:

7 Ask, and it shall be given you; seek, and ye
shall find; knock, and it shall be opened unto you:
8 For every one that asketh receiveth; and he that seeketh
findeth; and to him that knocketh it shall be opened.

The World English Bible translates the passage as:

7 "Ask, and it will be given you. Seek, and you will
find. Knock, and it will be opened for you.
8 For everyone who asks receives. He who seeks
finds. To him who knocks it will be opened.

The Novum Testamentum Graece text is:

7 Αἰτεῖτε, καὶ δοθήσεται ὑμῖν· ζητεῖτε, καὶ εὑρήσετε
κρούετε, καὶ ἀνοιγήσεται ὑμῖν.
8 πᾶς γὰρ ὁ αἰτῶν λαμβάνει
καὶ ὁ ζητῶν εὑρίσκει καὶ τῷ κρούοντι ἀνοιγήσεται.

For a collection of other versions, see BibleHub Matthew 7:7-8.

== Interpretation ==
The most common interpretation of these verses, which are also found at Luke 11:9–10, is that they are a return to the issue of prayer, which was discussed in the last chapter and is quite clearly addressed by the subsequent verses. In this view asking, seeking, and knocking are all metaphors for the act of prayer. In the original language the terms ask, seek, and knock are/were intended to mean a continuous act versus a one-time act: Ask (and keep asking), and it will be given you. Seek (and keep seeking), and you will find. Knock (and keep knocking) and the door will be opened for you. For everyone who asks (and keeps on asking) receives. He who seeks (and keeps on seeking) finds. To him who knocks (and keeps on knocking) the door will be opened. William Hendriksen notes that asking implies humility, an inferior asking for aid from a superior. Leon Morris notes that idea of seeking does not completely mesh with the prayer metaphor. The person praying who prays to God has obviously already decided that it is there that their answers are to be found. Morris feels that seeking in prayer means that the person does not know exactly what they need, and feel that they can seek the answer to this question through God. Fowler feels that the verb seek emphasizes the effort and concentration that must be put into prayer. Hendriksen summarizes this by describing seeking as "asking plus acting." Knocking, according to France, was also a metaphor for prayer in the Jewish literature of this period. Later in Matthew, however, knocking will be a metaphor for gaining admittance to the Kingdom of Heaven. The present imperative tense is used for the verbs in these verses. This implies that the asking, seeking, and knocking are all described as continuous actions, and this implies that prayer to be effective should also be a continual habit, rather than an occasional plea. Nolland posits that knocking may be linked to the Narrow Gate metaphor found in Matthew 7:13.

The verse presents prayer as certain to be answered, and the following verses explain why this is. This of course cannot mean that every demand made of God will be met in full. Fowler notes that in Matthew 6:5-13 Jesus has already laid out some rules for proper prayer. These verses thus cannot apply to all prayer, but only those who truly seek God. Christian theology has long tried to address the issue of prayers that seem unanswered. One notion is that God only gives good gifts. Even if you ask for something that will harm you, he will not provide it. Thus a prayer for wealth may not be answered, as such wealth may damage one's spiritual soul.

In Matthew 6:8 Jesus also states that prayer is not necessary as God knows what a person needs even before they ask him. Fowler feels that while prayer is not useful to God, it is useful to humans. If we do not have to toil through continuous prayer before receiving God's grace we will grow soft. The metaphor could also be one for religious study. Schweizer notes that Rabbis of the period and the Qumran community both put important stress on the pursuit of religious knowledge. Both groups believed that the true believer should strive to get to know God and the Law. The asking, seeking, and knocking, may be searches for knowledge just as much as for aid. This verse can thus be read as a support for inquisitiveness. A third view, rejected by almost all scholars, is that these verses are outlining a specific religious ritual involving asking, seeking, and knocking, and that the verse is not a metaphor at all. Luz notes that this alternative interpretation was central to Gnosticism, and this was one of the defining verses of that branch of Christianity. To Gnostics the continuous seeking for the hidden God was a central part of their faith. By contrast most other Christian groups describe believers as those who have found God, not those who are still seeking. The verse is elaborated upon by saying 92 in the Gospel of Thomas.

The words "Ask, and you will receive" also form part of Jesus' farewell discourse in John 16.

The common English expressions "Ask, and you shall receive" and "Seek, and ye shall find" are both derived from this verse.

== Commentary from the Church Fathers ==
Jerome: Having before forbidden us to pray for things of the flesh, He now shows what we ought to ask, saying, Ask, and it shall be given you.

Augustine: Otherwise; when He commanded not to give the holy thing to dogs, and not to cast pearls before swine, the hearer conscious of his own ignorance might say, Why do you thus bid me not give the holy thing to dogs, when as yet I see not that I have any holy thing? He therefore adds in good season, Ask, and ye shall receive.

Glossa Ordinaria: We ask with faith, we seek with hope, we knock with love. You must first ask that you may have; after that seek that you may find; and lastly, observe what you have found that you may enter in.

Augustine: Asking, is that we may get healthiness of soul that we may be able to fulfil the things commanded us; seeking, pertains to the discovery of the truth. But when any has found the true way, he will then come into actual possession, which however is only opened to him that knocks.

Augustine: How these three differ from one another, I have thought good to unfold with this travail; but it were better to refer them all to instant prayer; wherefore He afterwards concludes, saving, He will give good things to them that ask him.

Chrysostom: And in that He adds seek, and knock, He bids us ask with much importunateness and strength. For one who seeks, casts forth all other things from his mind, and is turned to that thing singly which he seeks; and he that knocks comes with vehemence and warm soul.

Pseudo-Chrysostom: He had said, Ask, and ye shall receive; which sinners hearing might perchance say, The Lord herein exhorts them that are worthy, but we are unworthy. Therefore He repeats it that He may commend the mercy of God to the righteous as well as to sinners; and therefore declares that everyone that asketh receiveth; that is, whether he be righteous or a sinner, let him not hesitate to ask; that it may be fully seen that none is neglected but he who hesitates to ask of God. For it is not credible that God should enjoin on men that work of piety which is displayed in doing good to our enemies, and should not Himself (being good) act so.

Augustine: Wherefore God hears sinners; for if He do not hear sinners, the Publican said in vain, Lord, be merciful to me a sinner; (Luke 18:13.) and by that confession merited justification.

Augustine: He who in faith offers supplication to God for the necessities of this life is heard mercifully, and not heard mercifully. For the physician knows better than the sick man what is good for his sickness. But if he asks that which God both promises and commands, his prayer shall be granted, for love shall receive what truth provides.

Augustine: But the Lord is good, who often gives us not what we would, that He may give us what we should rather prefer.

Augustine: There is need moreover of perseverance, that we may receive what we ask for.

Augustine: In that God sometimes delays His gifts, He but recommends, and does not deny them. For that which is long looked for is sweeter when obtained; but that is held cheap, which comes at once. Ask then and seek things righteous. For by asking and seeking grows the appetite of taking. God reserves for you those things which He is not willing to give you at once, that you may learn greatly to desire great things. Therefore we ought always to pray and not to fail.

== See also ==
- Seek Ye First

| Preceded by Matthew 7:6 | Gospel of Matthew; Chapter 7 | Succeeded by Matthew 7:9 |
