= Kurt Kaiser =

American singer-songwriter (1934 –2018)

- Born: December 17, 1934; Chicago, Illinois, U.S.
- Died: November 12, 2018 (aged 83) Waco, Texas, U.S.
- Genres: Worship; Contemporary Christian
- Occupations: Worship leader Songwriter
- Instrument: Piano
- Years active: 1945 – 2018
- Labels: Word Records 1959 – 1994; Sparrow Records 1994
- Website: http://www.kurtkaiser.com

Kurt Frederic Kaiser (December 17, 1934 – November 12, 2018) was an American contemporary church music composer and arranger.

== Biography ==
Kurt Kaiser was born on December 17, 1934, in Chicago, Illinois. He was the third child born to Elizabeth (née Seumper) and Otto Kaiser who were committed Plymouth Brethren. His father was born in Rheinland, Germany, and his mother was born in Westfalen, Germany. Kaiser studied at the American Conservatory of Music in Chicago while earning two degrees from Northwestern University. Kurt grew up performing throughout the city of Chicago. As early as 12 years of age, he was playing piano and organ for live radio on WMBI. At 15, Kurt spent more than a year in Billings, Montana, doing live radio on KGHL. While there he accompanied musicians, played for revivals and church events throughout the Northwest.

Kurt met his future bride, Patricia Anderson, during this period and married her in 1956. After his time in Billings, Kaiser spent a year and a half traveling with basso Bill Carle before entering the American Conservatory of Music at age eighteen.

Kaiser joined Word, Inc. in 1959 as Director of Artists and Repertoire, and later became vice president and Director of Music. With more than 300 copyrighted songs, he arranged and produced albums for many national and international artists, among them George Beverly Shea, Jerome Hines, Burl Ives, Tennessee Ernie Ford, Ethel Waters, Ken Medema, Joni Eareckson Tada, Anne Martindale Williams, Christopher Adkins & Stephen Nielson, Christopher Parkening, and Kathleen Battle.

Kaiser led innumerable choral workshops, performed concerts, and recorded eighteen solo albums at the piano. He received a Dove Award for his piano album, Psalms, Hymns, and Spiritual Songs on the Sparrow label.

For over 50 years, Kaiser influenced modern day church music and helped usher in a new era in American Christian music. Crossing denominational boundaries, his compositions have found their way into many church hymnals. Kaiser and composer Ralph Carmichael co-wrote the first broadly popular youth musical, Tell It Like It Is, sparking an explosion of popularity in this new genre of contemporary Christian music. Several other Carmichael–Kaiser musicals followed as churches, colleges, and universities recognized their value in conveying the Christian faith to a new generation. Kaiser continued to achieve subtle trend changes by maintaining sensitivity to music already widely accepted by the church, while managing to move into new and unexplored areas that have broadened the realm of worshipful, sacred music. Best known for the songs "Pass It On" and "Oh How He Loves You and Me," Kaiser continued to compose traditional church music. His timeless compositions helped insure that music in its purest form will continue to be embraced in the church worship experience. "The Lost Art of Listening" project has been hailed as one of the finest recorded works available today. The melody of "Pass It On" was used for a popular German hymn of similar content, "Ins Wasser fällt ein Stein".

During the past five decades, Kaiser copyrighted more than 300 songs, one of the latest being a Christmas piece, "One Quiet Night," that was premiered by the Waco Symphony. In 1999, Kaiser traveled to Sweden at the request of the U.S. Ambassador to perform with a string quartet and soloist at a gala Christmas gathering of guests and dignitaries at the Museum of History in Stockholm.

In 1992, Kaiser was awarded a special Lifetime Achievement Award from the American Society of Composers, Authors and Publishers (ASCAP) for his contributions to the Christian music industry. In November 2001, he was inducted into the Gospel Music Hall of Fame and received the Faithfulness in Service award in 2003. He received an Honorary Doctorate in Sacred Music degree from Trinity College in Illinois and an Honorary Doctorate in Humane Letters degree from Baylor University. Baylor also presented him with the Pro Ecclesia award in 2017. Through the years, Kaiser enjoyed his associations with the Baylor University music programs and the five years he conducted the Baylor Religious Hour Choir.

Kaiser served as president of the Waco Symphony Association and was a board member for the Christian Music Publishers Association as well as the Gospel Music Association. From 1959 until his death, Kurt and his wife Pat resided in Waco, Texas. They had four children, ten grandchildren, and two great-grandchildren.

== Death ==
Kaiser died on November 12, 2018, in Waco after struggling with ongoing health problems.

== Discography ==
- 1959: Kurt Kaiser Piano (Word W 3093-LP/WST 8035-LP)
- 1962: Preludes to Faith (Word W-3157-LP/WST-8095-LP)
- 1963: Hymntime Sing-Along (Word W-3176-LP/ WST 8110-LP)
- 1965: From London...Kurt Kaiser's Sweeping Strings (Word W-3301-LP/WST-8301-LP)
- 1965: Master Designer (Word W 3322-LP/ WST 8322-LP)
- 1966: Hymns of Prayer (Word W-3227/ WST-8327-LP)
- 1972: Kurt Kaiser: Pass it On (Word WST-8562-LP)
- 1975: An Offering (Word WST-8679-LP)
- 1979: Just For You: Loving Adventure with God (Word WSB-8728 LP)
- 1987: Alone with the Music (Word 701-90460196 CD)
- 1990: "Come Away" with Jenni Till (Kurt Kaiser Music)
- 1991: The Lost Art of Listening (Word 701-9329-609-CD)
- 1993: Christmas Favorites (Sparrow)
- 1994: Psalms, Hymns and Spiritual Songs (Sparrow)
- 2005: Kaiser: Emmanuel, Fantasie for Violin and Orchestra (Kurt Kaiser Music)
- 2013: Legacy (Kurt Kaiser Music)
