= Maranatha! Music =

- Parent company: Universal Music
- Founded: 1971
- Founder: Chuck Smith
- Distributor: Capitol Christian Music Distribution
- Genre: Jesus music, contemporary worship
- Country of origin: United States
- Official website: maranathamusic.com

Maranatha! Music is a Christian music record label which was founded as a nonprofit ministry of Calvary Chapel in 1971. The label is distributed by Capitol Christian Music Group, a division of Universal Music.

== Background ==
In the early 1970s Calvary Chapel was home to more than 15 musical groups that were representative of the Jesus movement. In 1971, Maranatha! Music was founded as a nonprofit outreach of Calvary Chapel to popularize and promote a new, folk-rock style of hymns and worship songs influenced by the Jesus people. Some of the early Maranatha! recording groups were Sweet Comfort Band, Love Song, Chuck Girard, Children of the Day, The Way, Debby Kerner, Mustard Seed Faith, Karen Lafferty, and Daniel Amos. The label's first release was a various artists compilation entitled The Everlastin' Living Jesus Music Concert, in 1971. The first release is also known as Maranatha! 1 as it became part of what would be called the Maranatha Series.

Maranatha! also branched into the children's market segment. Premier products included Psalty the Singing Songbook and The Kids Praise Album!. In the early 1990s this segment represented about 40% of company revenues.

In the 1980s, Maranatha! launched Broken Records, a label focusing on modern rock, punk and alternative music. The "Colours" series contained instrumental music in the vein of New Age artists, but the label avoided the term.

== Awards ==
In 1990, Maranatha! was awarded the National Religious Broadcasters' President's Award and in 1991, the Lifetime Achievement Award by the Gospel Music Association.

== Maranatha! Singers ==
=== Maranatha! Singers discography ===
- Praise 1: The Praise Album (1974)
- Praise 2: Open Our Eyes (1976)
- Praise 3: Behold, Bless Ye the Lord (1979)
- Praise 4: In His Time (1980)
- Praise 5: Glorify Thy Name (1981)
- Praise 6: Come and Sing Praises (1983)
- Praise 7: The Lord Reigns (1985)
- Praise 8: As the Deer (1986)
- Praise 9: Great Are You Lord (1987)
- Praise 10: O Lord, My Lord (1988)
- Praise 11: Let Us Worship the Lord, Jehovah (1989)
- Praise 12: He Is Able (1989)
- Praise 13: Meet Us Here (1990)
- Praise 14: I Will Celebrate (1991)
- Praise 15: He Has Made Me Glad (1992)
- Praise 16: The Power of Your Love (1997)
- Praise 17: In Your Presence (1997)
- Praise 18: Grace Alone (1998)
- Praise 19: Glorious Father (1999)
- Praise 20: Who Is Like the Lord (1999)

=== Maranatha Colours Discography ===
- A Time for Joy – Reflections In Guitar – Steve Erquiaga and Wayne Brasel (1986)
- A Time for Peace – Ivory Sessions – Jeffrey Lams, Frank Martin, Kenneth Nash (1985)
- Candlelight Colours - A Dinner Music Collection – Werner Hucks, Tom Howard, Kenneth Nash, Steve Erquiaga, Dieter Falk, Jeffrey Lambs (1993)
- Christmas Colours – John Andrew Schreiner (1992)
- Classical Praise Cello – Robin Thompson-Clarke (1993)
- Classical Praise Piano – Tom Keene (1991)
- Colours in the Night – Saxophone Solos - George Brooks (1993)
- Hiding Place – Music for Devotions – Nick Coetzee (1999)
- Hymns In Colour – Harlan Rogers and Smitty Price (1989)
- I Love You Lord – Classical Guitar Praise – Rob and Gilly Bennett (1990)
- Instruments of Your Peace – Celtic Music for Devotions – John Andrew Schreiner (1999)
- Jesus You Are My Life – Shawn Tubbs (1999)
- Jesus, Draw Me Close – Music for Devotions – Phil Kristianson (1998)
- Palette – A Colours Sampler – Tom Howard Ensemble, Phil Keaggy and Jeffrey Lams (1986)
- Praise – Harlan Rogers and Smitty Price (1987)
- Praise Beyond Words – A Colours Collection – Harlan Rogers, Phil Keaggy, Tom Howard (1991)
- Prisms – Portraits In Synthesis – Jeffrey Lams and John Andrew Schreiner (1986)
- Rainmaker – Music for Devotions – Nick Coetzee (1994)
- Reflection – A Colours Sampler – Tom Howard, Phil Keaggy, Smitty Price and Harlan Rogers (1987)
- Solo Piano – Tom Howard (1987)
- Spectrum – The Colours Sampler – Tom Howard, Phil Keaggy, Jeffrey Lams, John Andrew Schreiner and Steve Erquiaga (1986)
- Technicolours – Bob Somma & John Campbell (1991)
- The Colours of Praise Two – Harlan Rogers and Smitty Price (1988)
- The Gift – A Colours Christmas – Jeffrey Lams, John Andrew Schreiner, Tom Howard, Harlan Rogers and Smitty Price (1986)
- The Harvest – Piano Solos – Tom Howard (1986)
- The Hidden Passage – Tom Howard (1986)
- The Wind and the Wheat – Phil Keaggy (1987)
- Timeless – Hymns In Colour – Harlan Rogers & Smitty Price (1986)

=== Maranatha Sanctuary Series – Colours Reissues ===
Note: This series is the same as the Maranatha Colours projects except the song titles have been renamed. The original artist and music are retained.

- Hope (2002) – previously issued as "Classical Praise Cello"
- Mercy (2002) – previously issued as "Classical Praise Piano"
- Reflection (2002)- previously issued as "Tom Howard – The Harvest"
- Rest (2000) – previously issued as "A Time For Joy"
- Restoration (2002) – Compilation from Sanctuary Series
- Shelter (2000) – previously issued as "Tom Howard – The Hidden Passage"
- Serenity (2003) – previously issued as "Tom Howard – Solo Piano"
- Vision (2000) – previously issued as "Technicolours"

== Artists ==
- Charles Billingsley
- Jonathan Butler
- Terry Clark
- Teri DeSario
- Lenny LeBlanc
- Marsha Stevens
- Mustard Seed Faith
- Tommy Walker
- Kelly Willard

== See also ==
- List of record labels
