= Doris Akers =

American musician

Background information
- Born: Doris Mae Akers; May 21, 1923; Brookfield, Missouri, U.S.
- Died: July 26, 1995 (aged 72) Minneapolis, Minnesota, U.S.
- Genre: Gospel
- Occupations: Composer, arranger, recording artist
- Instruments: Piano, Voice
- Years active: 1945–1995
- Labels: Score, Superb, Songs of the Cross, Imperial, RCA Victor, Christian Faith, Manna Records, Praise, Worship
- Formerly of: Simmons-Akers Singers

Doris Mae Akers (May 21, 1923 – July 26, 1995) was an American gospel music composer, arranger and singer who is considered to be "one of the most underrated gospel composers of the 20th century [who] wrote more than 500 songs". Known for her work with the Sky Pilot Choir, she was inducted into the Gospel Music Hall of Fame in 2001.

== Biography ==
=== Early years ===
Doris Akers was born in Brookfield, Missouri to parents Floyd Akers (1887-1958) and Pearl M. Kelly (1896-1988). "Floyd and Pearl had married 21 June 1909 in Linn County, Missouri, an interracial marriage. They divorced some time after the birth of Bernice in 1926. When Pearl remarried to John Lawson (1892–1974) on 24 Feb. 1929, Doris and some of her siblings became part of that household, living in Kirksville, Adair County, Missouri, while three of her brothers stayed with their father." She had nine siblings: Edward, Floyd, Evelyn, Marian, Donald, Nellie, Bernice, Harley, and Charles. She learned to play the piano by ear at age six and wrote her first song, "Keep the Fire Burning in Me," when she was ten years old. During the 1930s, she formed a group with her siblings, Edward, Marian and Donald, who went by the name of "Dot and The Swingsters".

Bethel A.M.E. Church in Kirksville, Missouri, where Doris Akers first learned to sing and play Gospel music.

=== Early career ===
According to ASCAP documentation, in 1958, along with her friend Mahalia Jackson, Doris co-wrote the song "Lord, Don't Move the Mountain", which sold over a million records. This composition also became a hit for another gospel superstar, Inez Andrews, over a decade later.

While in Los Angeles, she became director of the Sky Pilot Choir, an integrated choir, which was also featured on recordings, television shows, and radio broadcasts across the country. Her fresh, modern arrangements of traditional Negro spirituals drew large crowds from far and near and increased attendance at the church dramatically. They released three albums: The Sky Pilot Choir, The Sky Pilot Choir Vol. 2 (with the Sutton Sisters), and Doris Akers Sings with The Sky Pilot Choir. Their organist on many occasions was a young Billy Preston. She ended her collaboration with the Sky Pilot Choir in 1965, but they reunited again in 1974 to record their fourth effort, Doris Akers and the Original Members of the Sky Pilot Choir.

Akers continued recording for RCA Victor into the mid-sixties, cutting such albums as Forever Faithful (1963); a collaboration with The Statesmen Quartet entitled Sing for You in 1964; and Highway to Heaven.

After having lived in Los Angeles since the mid-forties, she moved to Columbus, Ohio in 1970. On the "He Touched Me" track of her album All God's Children, she recounts an incident of playing the song at the St. James Pentecostal Church in that city. She continued recording, composing and traveling. An album, The Artistry of Doris Akers, was released in 1979.

=== Later career ===
In the 1980s, Akers issued a new gospel album every year on a regional midwest label. Each album cover featured a new color photograph of the artist to confirm it was a current production. She also recorded a few albums in Canada which were not distributed in the United States, such as Crusade LP 2702 with Glad Tidings Temple's Harvest Time Choir.

In the United States, she began recording for the Gaither label and appeared at some of their concerts and in TV productions. In the early 1990s she was featured in Bill Gaither's gospel videos Old Friends, Turn Your Radio On, and Precious Memories.

She was affectionately known as "Miss Gospel Music" because she was admired and respected by everyone in the music industry over the years, she had mastered every aspect of gospel music including vocals, keyboards, choir directing, arranging, composing and publishing, she had worked with many of the pioneers of the Golden Age of Gospel Music, she had authored many standard gospel compositions, and she moved freely and successfully in all spheres of gospel music. Many of her compositions such as "Lead Me, Guide Me", "I Cannot Fail The Lord", "You Can't Beat God Giving", and "Sweet, Sweet Spirit", sold millions for other gospel artists and evangelists. She was interviewed by Lindsay Terry for the book: "Stories Behind 50 Southern Gospel Favorites" and she explained how the hit song "Sweet, Sweet Spirit" was revealed to her during a prayer session with one of her choirs before a church service.

=== Last years and death ===
Akers lived out the final years of her life in Minneapolis, Minnesota, serving as Minister of Music at Grace Temple Deliverance Center. She discovered she had spinal cancer when she visited the doctor after breaking her ankle in August 1994. Akers died on July 26, 1995, in Edina, Minnesota. She was survived by two of her sisters, Nellie & Bernice, and her brother, Donald Akers.

== Works ==
=== Collections ===
- The Doris Akers Choral Series Vol. 1: Special Arrangements (1965)
- The Doris Akers Choral Series Vol. 2: Special Arrangements (1967)
- The Doris Akers Choral Series Vol. 3: Special Arrangements
- The Songs of Doris Akers for Voice and Piano with Guitar (1981)
- Doris Akers Favorite Gospel Songs Vol. 1 (1965)
- Doris Akers Favorite Gospel Songs Vol. 2 (1966)
- Doris Akers Favorite Gospel Songs Vol. 3
- Doris Akers Favorite Gospel Songs Vol. 4

=== Breakdown of published collections ===
Title	Year	Instrumentation	Collection	Published by
Ask what you will	1967	Solo voice, chorus (SATB), and piano	The Doris Akers Choral Series Volume 2: Special Arrangements.	Manna Music
Don't stop using me	1967	Solo voice, chorus (SATB), and piano	The Doris Akers Choral Series Volume 2: Special Arrangements.	Manna Music
Grow closer	1967	Solo voice, chorus (SATB), and piano	The Doris Akers Choral Series Volume 2: Special Arrangements.	Manna Music
Heaven (Happy home above)	1967	Solo voice, chorus (SATB), and piano	The Doris Akers Choral Series Volume 2: Special Arrangements.	Manna Music
Honey in that rock	1967	Solo voice, chorus (SATB), and piano	The Doris Akers Choral Series Volume 2: Special Arrangements.	Manna Music
I was there when the Spirit came	1967	Solo voice, chorus (SATB), and piano	The Doris Akers Choral Series Volume 2: Special Arrangements.	Manna Music
I'm not satisfied yet	1967	Solo voice, chorus (SATB), and piano	The Doris Akers Choral Series Volume 2: Special Arrangements.	Manna Music
Lord, keep my mind on Thee	1967	Solo voice, chorus (SATB), and piano	The Doris Akers Choral Series Volume 2: Special Arrangements.	Manna Music
Sweet, sweet Spirit	1967	Solo voice, chorus (SATB), and piano	The Doris Akers Choral Series Volume 2: Special Arrangements.	Manna Music
Grow closer	1966	Solo voice and piano	Doris Akers favorite gospel songs. Volume 2	Manna Music
God is so good	1966	Solo voice and piano	Doris Akers favorite gospel songs. Volume 2	Manna Music
He's a light unto my pathway	1966	Solo voice and piano	Doris Akers favorite gospel songs. Volume 2	Manna Music
How big is God?	1966	Solo voice and piano	Doris Akers favorite gospel songs. Volume 2	Manna Music
I sure do love the Lord	1966	Solo voice and piano	Doris Akers favorite gospel songs. Volume 2	Manna Music
I just got religion	1966	Solo voice and piano	Doris Akers favorite gospel songs. Volume 2	Manna Music
I was there when the spirit came	1966	Solo voice and piano	Doris Akers favorite gospel songs. Volume 2	Manna Music
I'm not satisfied yet	1966	Solo voice and piano	Doris Akers favorite gospel songs. Volume 2	Manna Music
Lead on, Lord Jesus	1966	Solo voice and piano	Doris Akers favorite gospel songs. Volume 2	Manna Music
Mine just for the asking	1966	Solo voice and piano	Doris Akers favorite gospel songs. Volume 2	Manna Music
No one but the Lord	1966	Solo voice and piano	Doris Akers favorite gospel songs. Volume 2	Manna Music
Sweet Jesus	1966	Solo voice and piano	Doris Akers favorite gospel songs. Volume 2	Manna Music
Sweet, sweet spirit	1965	Solo voice and piano	Doris Akers favorite gospel songs. Volume 1	Manna Music
I cannot fail the Lord	1965	Solo voice and piano	Doris Akers favorite gospel songs. Volume 1	Manna Music
He know and He cares	1965	Solo voice and piano	Doris Akers favorite gospel songs. Volume 1	Manna Music
Don't stop using me	1965	Solo voice and piano	Doris Akers favorite gospel songs. Volume 1	Manna Music
Is there any peace anywhere	1965	Solo voice and piano	Doris Akers favorite gospel songs. Volume 1	Manna Music
You can't beat God giving	1965	Solo voice and piano	Doris Akers favorite gospel songs. Volume 1	Manna Music
Prayer is the answer	1965	Solo voice and piano	Doris Akers favorite gospel songs. Volume 1	Manna Music
My song of assurance	1965	Solo voice and piano	Doris Akers favorite gospel songs. Volume 1	Manna Music
Ask what you will	1965	Solo voice and piano	Doris Akers favorite gospel songs. Volume 1	Manna Music
How great thou art	1965	Solo voice and piano	Doris Akers favorite gospel songs. Volume 1	Manna Music
Lord, don't move the mountain	1965	Solo voice and piano	Doris Akers favorite gospel songs. Volume 1	Manna Music
Lord, keep my mind on thee	1965	Solo voice and piano	Doris Akers favorite gospel songs. Volume 1	Manna Music
Trouble	1965	Solo voice and piano	Doris Akers favorite gospel songs. Volume 1	Manna Music

== Legacy and honors ==
Akers received many awards including back-to-back "Gospel Music Composer of the Year" in both 1960 and 1961. "Doris Akers Day" was held in Kirksville, Missouri in July, 1976. Akers was the headline act of the city's American Bicentennial celebration, with approximately 20,000 people attending an evening concert.

In 1992, Akers was honored by the Smithsonian Institution as "the foremost black gospel songwriter in the United States". She was posthumously inducted to the Gospel Music Hall of Fame in 2001. In 2011 Doris Akers was inducted into the Southern Gospel Music Hall of Fame.
