= Tim Sheppard =

English physiotherapist

Tim Sheppard is a Chartered Physiotherapist. He was physiotherapist for English football team Norwich City F.C.

Sheppard was team physio between 1980 and 2001 when he left for "family reasons"

Sheppard's service was recognised by the Norwich City Hall of Fame. He was an inaugural member
