= Terry Clark (musician) =

- Born: Terry Clark; 22 September 1946 (age 79); San Diego, California, United States
- Genres: Jesus music, contemporary Christian music, contemporary worship music
- Occupation: singer-songwriter
- Instruments: Vocals, keyboards, guitar
- Years active: 1974–present
- Label: Myrrh
- Website: www.catalystpeople.com

Terry Clark (born September 22, 1946) is an American Christian music singer and songwriter. He is a pioneer of the Jesus music genre, later to be called contemporary Christian music.

== Biography ==
Clark is a native of San Diego. Though raised in a Christian home, as a young man he began sampling many lifestyles. A tour of duty with the military in Southeast Asia (1968–1971) left him with severe post traumatic stress. As a result, he pushed away from reality. In that condition, he experienced a powerful glimpse of God's love for him. He recounts: "Jesus said 'Terry, I know how you feel—I've seen everything human beings have ever done--but I want you to understand the difference in our response to that. You've decided not to be a human being and I've decided to become one.'" An overwhelming sense of God's love began a transformation in his life. The psychiatrists evaluating him changed their prognosis from "no hope" to "recovering satisfactorily". Clark was part of a group called "The Children of Faith" which recorded one album in 1974. After they disbanded, he and his brother Duane joined the Myrrh Records recording group Liberation Suite for their 1975 European tour. After being a part of several group ministries, he became a solo artist. From 1980 to 2000, Clark's lead vocal was heard on over 65 songs on Maranatha! Music projects, including the Promise Keepers productions.

== Personal life ==
Clark and his wife, Nancy, had been involved in a few outreaches into the Spanish-speaking world over the years and they had a few songs they could sing in Spanish for those occasions. In January 2007, they were invited to go with Potter's Field Ministries to El Salvador. The primary result was the production of Tuyo Soy, an album completely in Spanish, cover and songs, exclusively for a Spanish-speaking audience.

== Discography ==
- We've Come To Worship - 2008
- Tuyo Soy - 2007
- The Prize - 2005
- Only Believe - 2000
- Love Heals - 1998
- This Christmas - 1996
- U Gada No - 1993
- Living Worship - 1992
- Worship Collection: I Am Yours - 1992
- In The Secret Place - 1991
- The Maranatha! Singers - Live Worship - 1990
- Terry Clark and the Clark Brothers Band: Heaven Is Not That Far Away - 1990
- Let's Worship - 1984
- Living Worship - 1984
- Melodies - 1980
- Welcome - 1977
- The Children of Faith - 1974
