= Dennis Agajanian =

American musician

Dennis Agajanian is an American Christian musician of Armenian descent; he has recorded over 20 albums. He has performed at churches in 120 countries, he has been featured at the Harvest Crusades and Billy Graham's crusades since 1974.

Agajanian is the recipient of multiple music awards including the Inspirational Country Music Association, Entertainer of the Year, and the Living Legend Award. Partnering with Samaritan's Purse, he has been involved with Operation Christmas Child, an organization that distributes shoeboxes which have been filled with gifts from local church members to over 100 million children around the world in over 130 countries.

He is a nephew of auto racing owner and promoter J. C. Agajanian.
