= Andrew Culverwell =

Andrew Culverwell (born on 19 December 1944 in Somerset, England) was an English Contemporary Christian music artist and songwriter who recorded in the 1970s and 1980s. His most notable contribution to contemporary Christian music is possibly the Christmas song "Come On Ring Those Bells", performed in 1977 by Evie. Andrew died 12/1/2023.

== Biography ==
Initially it was acting rather than music that attracted him, and he studied the theater at Italia Conti Stage School in London. His vocational interest changed at age 16 when he discovered a knack for playing piano by ear and for writing original tunes.

After leaving Italia Conti, Culverwell split his time between his day job at a shoe factory and travel with Contemporary Christian Music group The Four Kingsmen. He was with the group for four years before leaving to do solo concerts. British record producer Norrie Paramor discovered Culverwell and signed him to Polydor Records. Polydor released his first album Where is the Love.

In 1973, Andrae Crouch introduced Culverwell to Hal Spencer, president of Manna Records. He went on to record Andrew and Born Again for the label.

In 2012, much of Culverwell's early discography was re-released on CD through Chalosand 7 Records, including Take Another Look (1978), Everyday (1980), and Alive Again (1982).

== Partial discography ==
- Where is the Love? (1971) Polydor Records
- Andrew (1973) Manna Records
- Born Again (1975) Manna Records
- This is the Song (1976)
- Take Another Look (1978)
- Everyday (1980)
- Alive Again (1982)
- The Best of Andrew Culverwell (1984) Dayspring
- He Will Be There (1991)
