= Evie (singer) =

American singer

- Also known as: Evie Karlsson
- Born: Evelyn Tornquist; March 29, 1956 (age 70); Rahway, New Jersey
- Genres: Contemporary Christian music
- Occupation: singer
- Years active: 1970–present
- Website: eviemusic.org

Evelyn Tornquist Karlsson (born Evelyn Tornquist; March 29, 1956), mononymously known as Evie, is an American contemporary Christian music singer who was known in the late 1970s and early 1980s for songs such as "Mirror", "Step into the Sunshine" and "Four Foot Eleven".

Born in the United States to Norwegian immigrants, Evie began her singing career as a young teenager while visiting her parents' homeland. She released her English language debut album at 16 in 1972, and went on to release more than 30 albums, including several in various Scandinavian languages. Evie was recognized as the Dove Award recipient of Female Vocalist of the Year for 1977 and 1978.

In November 1978, she become the first gospel artist to achieve a gold album in Australia for Gentle Moments.

She married Swedish pastor and musician Pelle Karlsson in 1979 and retired from performing music in 1981 to pursue other avenues of ministry, such as Sky Angel. Evie later became a mentor to Christian musician Rebecca St. James, joining her for an event series geared toward helping girls and women apply biblical principles in the 21st century.

Evie was officially inducted into the Gospel Music Hall of Fame on February 22, 2005, and was one of the inaugural inductees to the Christian Music Hall of Fame.

Three of her albums were nominated for Grammy Award for best Contemporary Gospel performance: Mirror (1978), Come On, Ring Those Bells (1979), Never the Same (1980).

== Discography ==
- Evie Sings Gospel (1971)
- Evie på svenska (1972)
- Everything Is Beautiful (1972)
- A Song for Everyone (1973)
- Evie (1974)
- Du skulle vara med i sången (1975)
- Evie Again (1975)
- Gentle Moments (1976)
- Mirror (1977)
- Come On, Ring Those Bells (1977)
- A Little Song of Joy for My Little Friends (1978)
- Never the Same (1979) - AUS No. 95
- Teach Us Your Way (1980)
- Unfailing Love (1981)
- Hymns (1983)
- Restoration (1983)
- Christmas: A Happy Time (1984)
- When All Is Said and Done (1986)
- Celebrate the Family (1990)
- Songs for His Family (1996)
- Kingdom Connection (2002)
- Songs from the Hymn Book (2013)

Compilations

- Evie Favorites Volume 1 (1980)
- Complete - Volume 2 (1982)
- Loving Promises (1985)
- Christmas Memories (1987)
- Special Christmas Delivery (1995)
- Day By Day (1996)
- Our Recollections (1996)
- Come On Ring Those Bells (2004)
- Give Them All to Jesus (2005)
