= Ken Medema =

American musician and singer-songwriter (born 1943)

- Born: Kenneth Peter Medema; December 7, 1943 (age 82); Grand Rapids, Michigan, US
- Occupations: Musician, singer-songwriter
- Instruments: Vocals, keyboards
- Years active: 1973–present
- Labels: Word, Brier Patch Music
- Website: kenmedema.com

Kenneth Peter Medema (born December 7, 1943) is an American musician and singer-songwriter who has been performing in the United States, Canada, and Europe for more than forty years. Some of his best known songs began as live improvisations.

Medema was born almost blind; his eyes only let him tell light from shadow and see outlines of major objects. He began playing the piano when he was five years old, and three years later began taking lessons in classical music through braille music, playing by ear and improvising in different styles.

In 1969, he majored in music therapy at Michigan State University in Lansing, studying both piano and voice. Afterwards he worked as a music therapist in Fort Wayne, Indiana, and later at Essex County Hospital in New Jersey.

In 1973, he began performing and recording his own songs while at Essex County Hospital. "I had a bunch of teenagers who were really hurting," he says, "and I started writing songs about their lives. Then I thought, 'Why don't you start writing songs about your Christian life?' So I started doing that, and people really responded."

His lyrics generally provide social commentary on themes such as justice, hunger, poverty, homelessness, and Christian charity as it pertains to them. He has published a total of 26 albums, the first of which he recorded for Word and Shawnee Press, and then went on to found Brier Patch Music in 1985. Through Brier Patch Music, he organizes and schedules his events, as well as publishes his music. The business was named after Brer Rabbit's home in the legendary Uncle Remus stories. "Brer Rabbit lived in a place not comfortable for anyone else," Medema says, "and we decided to follow him there."

Performances regularly include songs improvised both musically and lyrically by accepting audience recommendations, sermon topics, or guest speaker stories as their basis. He performs in national and worldwide (church) congregations, campuses, youth gatherings, and annual assemblies. He lives near San Francisco, California, with his wife Jane. They have been married since 1965 and have two grown children and four grandchildren.
