= Children of the Day =

- Genres: Jesus music, contemporary Christian music
- Years active: 1971–1979
- Past members: Marsha Stevens; Wendy Carter; Russ Stevens; Peter Jacobs; Jeff Crandall

Children of the Day was a Jesus music group that recorded and toured from 1970 to 1980. It is considered to be the first group in the genre, and band member Marsha Stevens referred to as the mother of contemporary Christian music.

== Career ==
After becoming a born-again Christian, 16-year-old Marsha Carter was instrumental to leading her sister Wendy and friend Peter Jacobs to Christianity. The three of them invited Russ Stevens to church, where he became a believer. While driving 45 minutes to church, they would sing worship music in the car and developed harmonies. Marsha, Peter, and Wendy also wrote songs they would work out while driving. They helped lead music and gave no thought to being a group until they were asked to sing at another large church in Anaheim. At that point, the four of them realized they were a group and decided on the name, Children of the Day. All four sang, Marsha and Wendy played guitar, Peter played guitar and piano, and Russ played standup bass.

Released in 1971 on the Maranatha! Music label, the group's first album was titled Come to the Waters. In order to finance the project, the group borrowed $900 from Calvary Chapel pastor Chuck Smith in order to produce the album, which included what would become the group's best-known song penned by Marsha Stevens, For Those Tears I Died. The well-received album was followed two years later by With All Our Love (1973). Two more albums by the group were produced on the Maranatha! Music label, Where Else Could I Go (1975), and Christmas Album (1975). The group later signed with Light Records, releasing, Never Felt So Free (1977) and Butterfly (1979). With Peter Jacobs having left the group, Jeff Crandall did some vocal work on the Butterfly album. It was after the release of Butterfly that the group disbanded.

After the release of Butterfly, Marsha and Russ Stevens divorced. Following their divorce, Marsha Stevens publicly announced she was a lesbian. In The Encyclopedia of Contemporary Christian Music, editor Mark Powell referred to the incident as "Contemporary Christian Music's first official scandal".

Marsha Stevens founded her own ministry, BALM (Born Again Lesbian Music), in the mid-1980s and continues to write and record. Now going by Marsha Stevens-Pino, she is in a domestic partnership with Cindy Stevens-Pino; they both travel the United States with Stevens-Pino giving concerts in predominantly gay and lesbian and as well as gay-affirming churches and fellowships. Stevens-Pino also works to help develop the talents of up and coming LGBT Christian musicians through BALM's "UP Beat!" program.

Peter Jacobs produced Praise 2, and also wrote and produced Praise Strings 2 (Maranatha Music.) From those arrangements, he created Praise Symphony Orchestra, made up of volunteer musicians from local churches. Also, along with writing and producing 8 children's albums starring their character, Colby the Computer, Peter and his wife, Hanneke, wrote and produced the Colby's Clubhouse television series for the Trinity Broadcasting Network. Peter has produced over 100 albums over the years, and currently runs the Pete Jacobs Wartime Revue, a 15-piece big-band that performs live shows featuring hits of the 1930s and 1940s. This big band is fronted by AGT finalist, singer, Matt Mauser, and has headlined the annual New Year's Eve party at Mar A Lago with President Trump for many years. Pete also writes and arranges for his jazz group, the Pete Jacobs Quintet and the 70's/'80's tribute band, Hollywood and Vinyl.

In 1974, Wendy Carter married the band's "roadie", Kit Fremin; they later had two children, daughters Jessica and Rebecca. Wendy Fremin now teaches private voice and guitar lessons in Murrieta, CA, and works with Peter Jacobs.

== Members ==
- Marsha (Carter) Stevens
- Wendy (Carter) Fremin
- Russ Stevens
- Peter Jacobs (1971–79)
- Jeff Crandall (1979)

== Discography ==
- Come to the Waters (1971)
- ''With All Our Love'' (1973)
- Where Else Could I Go (1975)
- Christmas Album (1975)
- Never Felt So Free (1977)
- Butterfly (1979)
