= The Ministry Years =

Compilation album series by Keith Green
- Released: 1987 & 1988
- Genre: Contemporary Christian music
- Label: Sparrow
- Producer: Bill Maxwell

Professional ratings
Review scores
Source	Rating
AllMusic	Vol. 1; Vol. 2

The Ministry Years is a two-volume posthumous compilation album series by the American contemporary Christian music pianist and singer Keith Green, originally released in 1987 and 1988. Each two-disc volume covers half of Green's recording career: 1977–1979 and 1980–1982. Included with each volume is a 19-page booklet insert. These compilation albums include several previously unreleased songs (denoted by a ** below). Both volumes were re-released in 1999 with new covers patterned after the Songs of... series. The re-issue also includes a digital copy of the book No Compromise: The Life Story of Keith Green.

== Track listings ==
=== Volume One: 1977–1979 ===
Disc one
No.	Title	Writer(s)	Original album	Length
1.	"Because of You"	K. Green	For Him Who Has Ears to Hear (1977)	2:57
2.	"How Can They Live Without Jesus"	K. Green	No Compromise (1978)	3:10
3.	"Walk and Talk (Note: [duet with Barry McGuire, originally released on the 1976 various artists LP, Firewind, "A contemporary dramatic musical depicting the times after the death and resurrection of Jesus Christ as recorded in Acts 1–4."])"	Terry Talbot	Firewind (1976)	2:38
4.	"Run to the End of the Highway"	K. Green, M. Green	Jesus Commands Us to Go! (1984)	3:11
5.	"Your Love Broke Through"	K. Green, Randy Stonehill, Todd Fishkind	For Him Who Has Ears to Hear (1977)	3:31
6.	"The Victor"	Jamie Owens Collins	No Compromise (1978)	4:25
7.	"Thank You Jesus"	K. Green	Jesus Commands Us to Go! (1984)	2:57
8.	"The Prodigal Son Suite"	K. Green	The Prodigal Son (1983)	12:21
9.	"Stained Glass"	K. Green, M. Green	No Compromise (1978)	2:50
10.	"Go to the Hungry Ones"	K. Green, M. Green	previously unreleased (1987)**	3:04
11.	"Love With Me (Melody's Song)"	K. Green	The Prodigal Son (1983)	3:23
12.	"You Put This Love in My Heart"	K. Green	For Him Who Has Ears to Hear (1977)	3:32
13.	"There Is a Redeemer"	M. Green	Songs for the Shepherd (1982)	3:13
14.	"No One Believes in Me Anymore"	K. Green, M. Green	For Him Who Has Ears to Hear (1977)	3:24
15.	"On The Road to Jericho"	K. Green	Jesus Commands Us to Go! (1984)	3:25
16.	"You!"	K. Green, M. Green	No Compromise (1978)	3:38
17.	"When I Hear the Praises Start"	K. Green, M. Green	For Him Who Has Ears to Hear (1977)	4:27
18.	"Asleep in the Light"	K. Green	No Compromise (1978)	4:27

Disc two
No.	Title	Writer(s)	Original album	Length
1.	"He'll Take Care of the Rest"	K. Green, Wendell Burton	For Him Who Has Ears to Hear (1977)	4:02
2.	"Make My Life a Prayer to You"	M. Green	No Compromise (1978)	3:23
3.	"Easter Song"	Anne Herring	For Him Who Has Ears to Hear (1977)	3:59
4.	"When There's Love"	K. Green, M. Green, Bobby Hart	Jesus Commands Us to Go! (1984)	2:56
5.	"The Battle Is Already Won"	K. Green, Wendell Burton	previously unreleased (1987)**	3:32
6.	"Pledge My Head to Heaven (Note: (featuring Bob Dylan on harmonica))"	K. Green	So You Wanna Go Back to Egypt (1980)	3:55
7.	"My Eyes Are Dry"	K. Green	No Compromise (1978)	2:06
8.	"Song to My Parents (I Only Want to See You There)"	K. Green	For Him Who Has Ears to Hear (1977)	4:04
9.	"Trials Turned to Gold"	K. Green	For Him Who Has Ears to Hear (1977)	3:28
10.	"Dust to Dust"	M. Green	Jesus Commands Us to Go! (1984)	4:07
11.	"I Can't Believe It"	K. Green, M. Green	For Him Who Has Ears to Hear (1977)	3:40
12.	"To Obey Is Better Than Sacrifice"	K. Green	No Compromise (1978)	3:23
13.	"Soften Your Heart"	K. Green, M. Green	No Compromise (1978)	2:52
14.	"I Don't Wanna Fall Away from You"	K. Green	No Compromise (1978)	3:12
15.	"Here Am I, Send Me"	Wendell Burton, K. Green	previously unreleased (1987)**	3:45
16.	"I Can't Wait to Get to Heaven"	K. Green, M. Green	The Prodigal Son (1983)	4:12
17.	"Dear John Letter (To the Devil)"	K. Green	No Compromise (1978)	3:23
18.	"Rushing Wind"	K. Green, M. Green	The Keith Green Collection (1981)	3:44
19.	"Don't You Wish You Had the Answers"	M. Green	Jesus Commands Us to Go! (1984)	3:22
20.	"Altar Call (Live Version)"	K. Green	I Only Want To See You There (1983)	4:09

=== Volume Two: 1980–1982 ===
Disc one
No.	Title	Writer(s)	Original album	Length
1.	"You Are the One!"	M. Green, K. Green	Songs for the Shepherd (1982)	2:40
2.	"A Billion Starving People"	K. Green, M. Green	Jesus Commands Us to Go! (1984)	3:51
3.	"If You Love the Lord"	K. Green, M. Green	So You Wanna Go Back to Egypt (1980)	4:08
4.	"When I First Trusted You"	K. Green, M. Green	Jesus Commands Us to Go! (1984)	3:56
5.	"O God Our Lord"	K. Green	Songs for the Shepherd (1982)	3:52
6.	"Grace by Which I Stand"	K. Green	So You Wanna Go Back to Egypt (1980)	4:53
7.	"Only by Following Jesus"	K. Green	The Prodigal Son (1983)	3:17
8.	"The Sheep and the Goats"	K. Green	The Keith Green Collection (1981)	7:52
9.	"The Lord Is My Shepherd (23rd Psalm)"	M. Green, K. Green	Songs for the Shepherd (1982)	4:13
10.	"Unless the Lord Builds the House"	K. Green, M. Green	So You Wanna Go Back to Egypt (1980)	3:58
11.	"Summer Snow"	K. Green	previously unreleased (1988)**	3:48
12.	"Lies"	K. Green	So You Wanna Go Back to Egypt (1980)	3:43
13.	"Open Your Eyes"	M. Green	The Prodigal Son (1983)	4:42
14.	"I Will Give Thanks to the Lord (Psalm 9)"	M. Green	Songs for the Shepherd (1982)	1:48
15.	"Romans VII"	K. Green	So You Wanna Go Back to Egypt (1980)	3:26
16.	"Keith's Piano Prelude"	K. Green	Jesus Commands Us to Go! (1984)	4:16
17.	"Create in Me a Clean Heart"	K. Green	Jesus Commands Us to Go! (1984)	4:21

Disc two
No.	Title	Writer(s)	Original album	Length
1.	"So You Wanna Go Back to Egypt"	K. Green, M. Green	So You Wanna Go Back to Egypt (1980)	4:38
2.	"How Majestic Is Thy Name"	K. Green	Songs for the Shepherd (1982)	4:00
3.	"Scripture Song Medley": "This Is the Day"; "This Is My Commandment"; "Rejoice in the Lord Always"; "Clap Your Hands"	Les Garrett author unknown author unknown Jimmy Owens	The Keith Green Collection (1981)	3:49
4.	"Until That Final Day"	K. Green	Songs for the Shepherd (1982)	4:39
5.	"Cut the Devil Down"	K. Green, M. Green	previously unreleased (1988)**	3:42
6.	"I Want to Be More Like Jesus"	Kelly Willard, K. Green, M. Green	So You Wanna Go Back to Egypt (1980)	4:25
7.	"The Promise Song"	K. Green, M. Green	Songs for the Shepherd (1982)	3:21
8.	"Jesus Commands Us to Go!"	K. Green, M. Green	Jesus Commands Us to Go! (1984)	5:15
9.	"Holy, Holy, Holy"	John B. Dykes, Reginald Heber	Songs for the Shepherd (1982)	3:42
10.	"Jesus Is Lord of All!"	K. Green	Songs for the Shepherd (1982)	2:34
11.	"Oh Lord, You're Beautiful"	K. Green	So You Wanna Go Back to Egypt (1980)	4:20
12.	"Keep All That Junk to Yourself"	K. Green, M. Green	The Prodigal Son (1983)	3:30
13.	"Draw Me"	K. Green, M. Green	Songs for the Shepherd (1982)	3:49
14.	"You Love the World (And You're Avoiding Me)"	K. Green	So You Wanna Go Back to Egypt (1980)	2:39
15.	"Lord I'm Gonna Love You"	K. Green, M. Green	The Prodigal Son (1983)	2:53
16.	"Glory Lord Jesus"	K. Green	Songs for the Shepherd (1982)	3:20
17.	"Song for Josiah"	K. Green	The Prodigal Son (1983)	6:25
