= Mike Deasy =

American rock and jazz guitarist

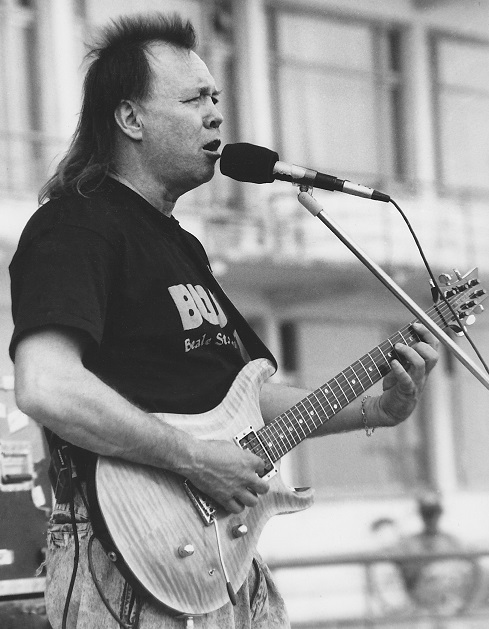
- Mike Deasy in Pärnu, Estonia 1992

Background information
- Born: Michael William Deasy; February 4, 1941 (age 85); Los Angeles, California, U.S.
- Genre: Rock
- Occupations: Singer, songwriter, musician
- Instruments: Guitar, sitar, vocals
- Years active: 1958–present
- Labels: Capitol, Sparrow, Saltmine
- Website: www.mikedeasy.com

Michael William Deasy (born February 4, 1941) is an American rock and jazz guitarist. As a session musician, he played on numerous hit singles and albums recorded in Los Angeles in the 1960s, 1970s and 1980s. He is sometimes credited as Mike Deasy Sr.

== Biography ==
Deasy was born and raised in Los Angeles, California, where he learned to play guitar as a child. While still in high school, he played in bands backing visiting musicians such as Ricky Nelson and The Everly Brothers, and also played in Ritchie Valens' touring band with Bruce Johnston, Larry Knechtel, Sandy Nelson, and Jim Horn. After graduating in 1959, he joined Eddie Cochran's band, the Kelly Four, where he played both guitar and baritone sax and made his first recordings. He also played with The Coasters and Duane Eddy.

Following Cochran's death in 1960, he became an active session musician in Los Angeles after winning a Down Beat magazine collegiate jazz music scholarship in 1961. Deasy married Jim Horn's sister Kathie in 1961, and the couple later set up their own recording studio and production company, Saltmine Recording. He worked as a member of "The Wrecking Crew", with Hal Blaine, Joe Osborn, Larry Knechtel and others, on sessions for Phil Spector, and contributed guitar parts to The Beach Boys' album Pet Sounds. In the 1960s and later years he also worked on records by the Monkees, the Association, Scott McKenzie, Johnny Rivers, the Fifth Dimension, Rick Nelson, Randy Newman, Spanky & Our Gang, Tommy Roe, Fats Domino, The Byrds, Michael Jackson, Helen Reddy, Frank Zappa, and others.

In 1967, he contributed to albums coordinated by record producer Curt Boettcher, including Friar Tuck and His Psychedelic Guitar, effectively a Deasy solo album with wordless vocals by Boettcher. Under the pseudonym Lybuk Hyd, Deasy also played guitar and sitar on the psychedelic concept album Tanyet, credited to The Ceyleib People, which also featured Ry Cooder.

Deasy played guitar (with Tommy Tedesco and Al Casey) on Elvis Presley's 1968 TV special, Elvis. He also performed live with musicians including Cannonball Adderley and Little Richard. In 1969, he was invited by record producer Terry Melcher to work with a newly discovered singer-songwriter, Charles Manson. Deasy left Manson's home after three days, "in a state of drug-fueled paranoia".

Deasy continued to record with leading musicians, including Frank Sinatra, Ella Fitzgerald, Barbra Streisand, Chet Baker, and Mel Tormé. His guitar playing has appeared on the soundtrack of many films including The Graduate, Guess Who's Coming to Dinner, Duel, Bullitt, and Dirty Harry, as well as on many commercials.

From the early 1970s onwards after becoming a born again Christian at the 1969 Billy Graham crusade in Anaheim, California, Deasy became increasingly involved with Contemporary Christian music, producing and writing songs for several successful albums, often in conjunction with his wife. In later years, he has had a parallel career as a motivational speaker, and since 1988 has run a "Yes To Life" educational and inspirational program in schools and colleges in the US, Canada and Europe. The Deasys also co-pastored Rock Church Southeast in Port Arthur, Texas, until it eventually shut its doors when Hurricane Harvey flooded the building.

== Discography ==
- Your Gang (Mercury, 1966)
- Tanyet (Vault, 1967)
- Friar Tuck and His Psychedelic Guitar (Mercury, 1967)
- Gator Creek (Mercury, 1970)
- Letters to My Head (Capitol, 1973)
- Wings of an Eagle (Sparrow, 1976)
- Wings of Praise (Saltmine, 1987)
- God Hates Queer (Saltmine, 1988)
- Holy Smoke (Saltmine, 1991)
- Tru Love (Saltmine, 1994)
- Guitar Gold (Saltmine, 1995)
- Signs and Wonders (Saltmine, 1999)
- Paper Airplane (Saltmine, 2000)
- Path of Peace Vol. 1 (Saltmine, 2003)
- Path of Peace Vol. 2 (Saltmine, 2003)
- Endtimes Weather Band (Saltmine, 2011)
- Driftin' (Saltmine, 2013)
- The Road Home Vol. 1 (Saltmine)
- The Road Home Vol. 2 (Saltmine)

== Partial credits as a sideman ==
Year	Artist	Album title	Allmusic Pro Rating	Allmusic User Rating
1960	Eddie Cochran	"12 Of His Biggest Hits"	0/5 stars	5/5 stars
1962	Aki Aleong and His Licorice Twisters	"Twistin' The Hits"	0/5 stars	4/5 stars
1964	The Road Runners	"The New Mustang and Other Hot Rod Hits"	0/5 stars	4/5 stars
1965	Gary Lewis & The Playboys	"This Diamond Ring"	2/5 stars	3.5/5 stars
1965	Dennis Budimir	"The Creeper"	0/5 stars	0/5 stars
1965	Irene Kral	"Wonderful Life"	3/5 stars	3.5/5 stars
1966	Petula Clark	"My Love"	3/5 stars	3.5/5 stars
1966	Pete Candoli	"Moscow Mule and Many More Kicks"	0/5 stars	0/5 stars
1966	Tommy Roe	"Sweet Pea"	0/5 stars	4/5 stars
1966	The Deep Six	"The Deep Six"	3/5 stars	4.5/5 stars
1966	Nancy Sinatra	"Boots"	3/5 stars	4/5 stars
1966	The Monkees	"The Monkees"	4/5 stars	4/5 stars
1966	Bobby Darin	"If I Were a Carpenter"	2/5 stars	4.5/5 stars
1966	The Beach Boys	"Pet Sounds"	5/5 stars	5/5 stars
1966	Ben Benay	"The Big Blues Harmonica of Ben Benay"	0/5 stars	4/5 stars
1966	Your Gang	"If You Want To Buy 'Em"	0/5 stars	3.5/5 stars
1966	Jerry Goldsmith	"Stagecoach O.S.T."	3.5/5 stars	5/5 stars
1966	The Association	"And Then... Along Comes the Association"	4/5 stars	4/5 stars
1966	Lalo Schifrin	"Murderer's Row"	0/5 stars	0/5 stars
1967	Dean Martin	"Happiness Is Dean Martin"	2.5/5 stars	4/5 stars
1967	Paul Revere & the Raiders	"Revolution!"	4/5 stars	4/5 stars
1967	Nilsson	"Pandemonium Shadow Show"	4.5/5 stars	4.5/5 stars
1967	Scott McKenzie	"The Voice of Scott McKenzie"	3.5/5 stars	4/5 stars
1967	Elvis Presley	"Double Trouble"	1/5 stars	3/5 stars
1967	The Ventures	"Super Psychedelics"	4/5 stars	4.5/5 stars
1967	Bobbie Gentry	"Ode to Billie Joe"	4.5/5 stars	4.5/5 stars
1967	The First Edition	"The First Edition"	0/5 stars	4/5 stars
1967	The Parade	"The Parade"	4.5/5 stars	4.5/5 stars
1967	The 5th Dimension	"The Magic Garden"	3/5 stars	4.5/5 stars
1967	The Association	"Insight Out"	3.5/5 stars	4/5 stars
1967	Gary Lewis & The Playboys	"Listen!"	4/5 stars	4/5 stars
1967	Jan and Dean	"Carnival of Sound"	0/5 stars	4/5 stars
1967	Tommy Roe	"Phantasy"	2.5/5 stars	4.5/5 stars
1967	The Yellow Balloon	"The Yellow Balloon"	4/5 stars	4/5 stars
1967	The Monkees	"More of the Monkees"	4/5 stars	4.5/5 stars
1967	The Robbs	"The Robbs"	4/5 stars	4.5/5 stars
1967	Harpers Bizarre	"Feelin' Groovy"	4/5 stars	3.5/5 stars
1967	Gale Garnett	"Sings About Flying & Rainbows & Love & Other Groovy Things"	0/5 stars	4/5 stars
1967	The Cake	"The Cake"	4/5 stars	4.5/5 stars
1967	Sagittarius	"Present Tense"	4.5/5 stars	4.5/5 stars
1967	The Ceyleib People	"Tanyet"	0/5 stars	4/5 stars
1967	The Beach Boys	"Smiley Smile"	4/5 stars	4/5 stars
1967	Johnny Rivers	"Rewind"	3/5 stars	4.5/5 stars
1967	Lesley Gore	"Magic Colors"	3/5 stars	4/5 stars
1967	Bobby Darin	"Inside Out"	2/5 stars	5/5 stars
1967	Tommy Roe	"It's Now Winter's Day"	4/5 stars	4.5/5 stars
1967	Harpers Bizarre	"Anything Goes"	2/5 stars	4/5 stars
1967	Rick Nelson	"Another Side Of Rick"	2/5 stars	4/5 stars
1967	Dean Martin	"Welcome to My World"	3/5 stars	4/5 stars
1968	Honey Ltd.	"Honey Ltd."	3.5/5 stars	4.5/5 stars
1968	Frank De Vol	"Guess Who's Coming to Dinner O.S.T."	0/5 stars	5/5 stars
1968	Spanky & Our Gang	"Like to Get to Know You"	4/5 stars	3.5/5 stars
1968	The Lettermen	"Put Your Head On My Shoulder"	2/5 stars	4.5/5 stars
1968	The Sugar Shoppe	"The Sugar Shoppe"	0/5 stars	4.5/5 stars
1968	Richard Harris	"A Tramp Shining"	4/5 stars	4.5/5 stars
1968	Randy Newman	"Randy Newman"	4.5/5 stars	4.5/5 stars
1968	Elvis Presley	"Elvis"	4.5/5 stars	5/5 stars
1968	The Millennium	"Begin"	4.5/5 stars	4.5/5 stars
1968	Lalo Schifrin	"Bullitt"	4.5/5 stars	4.5/5 stars
1968	The Monkees	"The Birds, The Bees & The Monkees"	3/5 stars	4/5 stars
1968	Carmen McRae	"The Sound of Silence"	3/5 stars	4/5 stars
1968	The Gosdin Brothers	"Sounds of Goodbye"	4.5/5 stars	4/5 stars
1968	Fats Domino	"Fats Is Back"	3.5/5 stars	4/5 stars
1968	Tiny Tim	"God Bless Tiny Tim"	4/5 stars	4.5/5 stars
1968	The Gentle Soul	"The Gentle Soul"	3/5 stars	4.5/5 stars
1968	Rick Nelson	"Perspective"	2/5 stars	4/5 stars
1968	Richard Harris	"The Yard Went On Forever"	4.5/5 stars	5/5 stars
1968	The Association	"Birthday"	4.5/5 stars	5/5 stars
1968	Mason Williams	"The Mason Williams Phonograph Record"	3/5 stars	4/5 stars
1968	Mel Tormé	"A Day in the Life of Bonnie and Clyde"	0/5 stars	4/5 stars
1968	The Grass Roots	"Golden Grass"	3.5/5 stars	4.5/5 stars
1968	The Beau Brummels	"Bradley's Barn"	4/5 stars	4.5/5 stars
1968	Peggy Lipton	"Peggy Lipton"	3/5 stars	4/5 stars
1968	The 5th Dimension	"Stoned Soul Picnic"	3/5 stars	4.5/5 stars
1969	The Monkees	"The Monkees Present"	3/5 stars	3.5/5 stars
1969	Jimmie Rodgers	"Windmills of Your Mind"	4/5 stars	5/5 stars
1969	Larry Norman	"Upon This Rock"	4/5 stars	4/5 stars
1969	Elvis Presley	"Elvis Sings Flaming Star"	3/5 stars	4/5 stars
1969	Laura Nyro	"New York Tendaberry"	4.5/5 stars	4.5/5 stars
1969	Mark Spoelstra	"Mark Spoelstra"	0/5 stars	4/5 stars
1969	Michele O'Malley	"Saturn Rings"	3.5/5 stars	3.5/5 stars
1969	Tommy Boyce & Bobby Hart	"It's All Happening On The Inside"	2.5/5 stars	4/5 stars
1969	Tommy Roe	"Dizzy"	0/5 stars	4.5/5 stars
1969	Jackie Gleason	"The Now Sound ... For Today's Lovers"	0/5 stars	0/5 stars
1969	John Simon	"Last Summer" O.S.T.	0/5 stars	4/5 stars
1969	Townes Van Zandt	"Our Mother the Mountain"	4/5 stars	4.5/5 stars
1969	Thelma Houston	"Sunshower"	4.5/5 stars	5/5 stars
1969	The Grass Roots	"Lovin' Things"	1.5/5 stars	4/5 stars
1969	The Mystic Moods Orchestra	"Extensions"	0/5 stars	4/5 stars
1969	Cass Elliot	"Bubblegum, Lemonade, and... Something for Mama"	3/5 stars	4/5 stars
1969	Stan Kenton	"Hair"	0/5 stars	0/5 stars
1969	The 5th Dimension	"The Age of Aquarius"	4/5 stars	4.5/5 stars
1969	The Monkees	"Instant Replay"	4/5 stars	4/5 stars
1969	Peggy Lee	"A Natural Woman"	3/5 stars	4.5/5 stars
1970	Jackie DeShannon	"To Be Free"	3.5/5 stars	4/5 stars
1970	The 5th Dimension	"The July 5th Album"	3/5 stars	5/5 stars
1970	Paul Williams	"Someday Man"	4.5/5 stars	4/5 stars
1970	Bobby Scott	"Robert William Scott - In Memory of the Race"	3/5 stars	4.5/5 stars
1970	Elvis Presley	"Let's Be Friends"	3/5 stars	3.5/5 stars
1970	The Jackson 5	"ABC"	4.5/5 stars	4.5/5 stars
1970	Claudine Longet	"Run Wild, Run Free"	3.5/5 stars	3.5/5 stars
1970	Tommy Roe	"We Can Make Music"	3/5 stars	3.5/5 stars
1970	Chet Baker	"Blood, Chet and Tears"	1.5/5 stars	3/5 stars
1970	The 5th Dimension	"Portrait"	4/5 stars	4.5/5 stars
1971	Jack Daugherty	"Class Of Nineteen Hundred and Seventy One"	0/5 stars	5/5 stars
1971	Howard Roberts	"Antelope Freeway"	3/5 stars	3.5/5 stars
1971	David Axelrod	"Rock Interpretation of Handel's Messiah"	3.5/5 stars	3.5/5 stars
1971	Cannonball Adderley	"The Black Messiah"	3.5/5 stars	4/5 stars
1971	Elvis Presley	"You'll Never Walk Alone"	3/5 stars	5/5 stars
1971	The Flying Burrito Brothers	"The Flying Burrito Bros."	3/5 stars	4/5 stars
1971	Kim Carnes	"Rest on Me"	2/5 stars	4/5 stars
1971	The Sandpipers	"A Gift of Song"	0/5 stars	4/5 stars
1971	Solomon Burke	"Electronic Magnetism"	3/5 stars	4/5 stars
1971	Johnny Rivers	"Home Grown"	3/5 stars	4.5/5 stars
1970	Jackie DeShannon	"Songs"	4/5 stars	5/5 stars
1971	The 5th Dimension	"Love's Lines, Angles and Rhymes"	3.5/5 stars	4.5/5 stars
1971	Barbra Streisand	"Barbra Joan Streisand"	4.5/5 stars	4/5 stars
1971	Nilsson	"Aerial Pandemonium Ballet"	4/5 stars	4.5/5 stars
1972	David Clayton-Thomas	"David Clayton-Thomas"	4/5 stars	4/5 stars
1972	Dean Martin	"Dino"	2.5/5 stars	4/5 stars
1972	John Stewart	"Sunstorm"	3/5 stars	4/5 stars
1972	Helen Reddy	"I Am Woman"	4/5 stars	4/5 stars
1972	Little Richard	”Southern Child” released 2005		
1972	Cannonball Adderley / Nat Adderley	"Soul Zodiac"	4/5 stars	3.5/5 stars
1972	Kenny Rankin	"Like a Seed"	4.5/5 stars	4.5/5 stars
1973	Incredible Bongo Band	"Bongo Rock"	3.5/5 stars	4.5/5 stars
1973	Barry McGuire	"Seeds"	3/5 stars	5/5 stars
1973	Della Reese	"Let Me In Your Life"	0/5 stars	0/5 stars
1973	Andy Williams	"Solitaire"	4/5 stars	4.5/5 stars
1973	Frank Sinatra	"Ol' Blue Eyes Is Back"	2/5 stars	4/5 stars
1973	Helen Reddy	"Long Hard Climb"	4/5 stars	4/5 stars
1974	2nd Chapter of Acts	"With Footnotes"	0/5 stars	5/5 stars
1974	Terry Melcher	"Terry Melcher"	3.5/5 stars	4.5/5 stars
1974	Billy Joel	"Streetlife Serenade"	3/5 stars	3.5/5 stars
1974	Incredible Bongo Band	"Return of the Incredible Bongo Band"	2.5/5 stars	4.5/5 stars
1975	Barry McGuire	"Lighten Up"	2/5 stars	5/5 stars
1975	Jackie DeShannon	"New Arrangement"	3.5/5 stars	4.5/5 stars
1975	Frankie Valli	"Closeup"	3.5/5 stars	4.5/5 stars
1975	Kenny Rankin	"Inside"	4.5/5 stars	5/5 stars
1976	Annie Herring	"Through a Child's Eyes"	0/5 stars	5/5 stars
1976	Cannonball Adderley	"Music You All"	4/5 stars	4/5 stars
1976	Janny Grein	"Covenant Woman"	2/5 stars	5/5 stars
1977	Keith Green	"For Him Who Has Ears to Hear"	5/5 stars	5/5 stars
1978	Candle	"Bullfrogs and Butterflies"	4.5/5 stars	4.5/5 stars
1979	Barry McGuire	"Cosmic Cowboy"	0/5 stars	4.5/5 stars
1979	Scott Wesley Brown	"One Step Closer"	0/5 stars	5/5 stars
1983	Phil Driscoll	"I Exalt Thee"	4.5/5 stars	5/5 stars
1983	Phil Spector	"Back to Mono (1958–1969)"	5/5 stars	5/5 stars

== Film and television ==
Title	Composer, Conductor or Artist	Year of Release
Go, Johnny, Go!	Eddie Cochran	1959
Stagecoach	Jerry Goldsmith	1966
Spinout	George Stoll	1966
Grand Prix	Maurice Jarre	1966
Murderer's Row	Lalo Schifrin	1966
The Monkees	The Monkees	1966
Double Trouble	Jeff Alexander	1967
Guess Who's Coming to Dinner	Frank De Vol	1967
The Smothers Brothers Comedy Hour	Nelson Riddle	1967
Bullitt	Lalo Schifrin	1968
The Heart Is a Lonely Hunter	Dave Grusin	1968
Skidoo	Harry Nilsson	1968
Yours, Mine and Ours	Fred Karlin	1968
I Love You, Alice B. Toklas	Elmer Bernstein	1968
The Sweet Ride	Pete Rugolo	1968
Lady in Cement	Hugo Montenegro	1968
Elvis	Bones Howe	1968
The Graduate	Dave Grusin	1968
Monterey Pop	various	1968
Get Smart	Irving Szathmary	1968
What's So Bad About Feeling Good?	Frank De Vol	1968
Coogan's Bluff	Lalo Schifrin	1968
The Summer Brothers Smothers Show	Nelson Riddle	1968
Hang 'Em High	Dominic Frontiere	1968
The Banana Splits Adventure Hour	Ted Nichols	1968
Last Summer	John Simon	1969
Change of Habit	Billy Goldenberg	1969
The Andy Williams Show	Nick Perito	1969
33⅓ Revolutions per Monkee	The Monkees	1969
Sweet Charity	Cy Coleman	1969
Watermelon Man	Melvin Van Peebles	1970
WUSA	Lalo Schifrin	1970
Josie and the Pussycats	Ted Nichols	1970
Sometimes a Great Notion	Henry Mancini	1970
Adam at 6 A.M.	Dave Grusin	1970
The Phynx	Mike Stoller	1970
The Partridge Family	Wes Farrell	1970
Beyond the Valley of the Dolls	Stu Phillips	1970
Star Spangled Girl	Charles Fox	1971
Flip	George Wyle	1970
The Sonny & Cher Comedy Hour	Marty Paich	1971
Play Misty for Me	Dee Barton	1971
Alias Smith and Jones	Billy Goldenberg	1971
Plaza Suite (film)	Maurice Jarre	1971
Duel	Billy Goldenberg	1971
Dirty Harry	Lalo Schifrin	1971
The New Bill Cosby Show	Quincy Jones	1972
Butterflies Are Free	Bob Alcivar	1972
The Getaway	Quincy Jones	1972
The Great Northfield Minnesota Raid	Dave Grusin	1972
Play It Again Sam	Billy Goldenberg	1972
Portnoy's Complaint	Michel Legrand	1972
Magnum Force	Lalo Schifrin	1973
High Plains Drifter	Dee Barton	1973
The Outlaw Josey Wales	Jerry Fielding	1976
Sudden Impact	Lalo Schifrin	1983
The Wrecking Crew	various	2008
Sample This - The Birth of Hip Hop	Perry Botkin, Jr.	2012
