= No Compromise (album) =

Studio album by Keith Green
- Released: November 9, 1978
- Recorded: 1978
- Genre: Contemporary Christian music
- Length: 39:52
- Label: Sparrow
- Producer: Bill Maxwell, Keith Green

Keith Green chronology
For Him Who Has Ears to Hear (1977)	No Compromise (1978)	So You Wanna Go Back to Egypt (1980)

Professional ratings
Review scores
Source	Rating
AllMusic	4.5/5 stars

No Compromise is the second album release by contemporary Christian music artist Keith Green, released in 1978.

The album's title derives from the song "Make My Life a Prayer to You" written by Keith's wife Melody, which begins: "Make my life a prayer to You / I wanna do what You want me to / No empty words and no white lies / no token prayers, no compromise." (The title was used for the official Keith Green biography written by his wife Melody Green, which was included in Rich Text Format (RTF) and Portable Document Format (PDF) formats on The Ministry Years, Volume Two (1980-1982) (CD release), which has the Enhanced CD label, and was also used for the Various Artists compilation No Compromise: Remembering The Music Of Keith Green featuring covers of classic Keith Green songs)

No Compromise features cover art that refers to the Book of Esther in the Bible, specifically the part where Mordecai refused to bow to Haman.

== Making of the album ==
Much like Green's first work, this album was produced by Bill Maxwell, who also contributed some of the instrumental playing on the album along with Keith Green himself.

== Track listing ==
1. Soften Your Heart (Keith & Melody Green) – 2:52
2. Make My Life a Prayer to You (Melody Green) – 3:23
3. Dear John Letter (To the Devil) (Keith Green) – 3:23
4. How Can They Live Without Jesus? (Keith Green) – 3:09
5. Asleep In the Light (Keith Green) – 4:26
6. My Eyes Are Dry (Keith Green) – 2:05
7. You! (Keith & Melody Green) – 3:38
8. I Don't Wanna Fall Away From You (Keith Green) – 3:11
9. Stained Glass (Keith & Melody Green) – 2:50
10. To Obey Is Better Than Sacrifice (Keith Green) – 3:22
11. The Victor (Jamie Owens-Collins) – 4:25
12. Altar Call (Keith Green) – 3:39

== Influence ==
The song 'How Can They Live Without Jesus?' was covered by the band Glad for the 1993 Keith Green tribute album No Compromise: Remembering the Music of Keith Green. The song, "Make My Life a Prayer To You", was covered by Matt Redman & Paul Oakley in 2002 for another tribute album, Your Love Broke Through: The Worship Songs of Keith Green.
