= There Is a Redeemer =

1977 Christian worship song written by Melody Green

"There Is a Redeemer" is a praise and worship song first written by Melody Green in 1977 and popularized by her husband, contemporary Christian musician Keith Green. It was first released on 1982's Songs for the Shepherd, the last album to be released before his death in a plane crash. The final verse was added by Keith.

The song has been covered by various artists such as Robin Mark, David Nevue, Kathryn Scott, Selah, Kathy Troccoli, Michelle Tumes, Matthew Ward, the band Captive Free (a capella), and Kelly Willard. It appears in twenty hymnals and has been described as a 'classic.'
