= The Prodigal Son (Keith Green album) =

Studio album by Keith Green
- Released: August 15, 1983
- Recorded: 1977–1983
- Genre: Contemporary Christian music
- Length: 38:10
- Label: Pretty Good
- Producer: Keith Green

Keith Green chronology
Songs for the Shepherd (1982)	The Prodigal Son (1983)	I Only Want to See You There (1983)

Professional ratings
Review scores
Source	Rating
AllMusic	3/5 stars

The Prodigal Son is the second posthumous release by American contemporary Christian music pianist and singer Keith Green. His widow Melody Green assembled it from unreleased material and released it in 1983.

The album features one of his most notable songs, "The Prodigal Son Suite", originally written by Green in hopes of completing a full rock opera based on Biblical stories and parables. Another component of that project -- "On the Road to Jericho", telling the story of the Good Samaritan—was released on Green's final posthumous album, Jesus Commands Us to Go!.

== Track listing ==
All tracks feature Keith Green on lead vocals.

1. "I Can't Wait to Get to Heaven" (Keith & Melody Green) – 4:13
2. "Lord, I'm Gonna Love You" (Keith Green) – 2:54
3. "The Prodigal Son Suite" (Keith Green) – 12:19
4. "Keep All That Junk to Yourself" (Keith & Melody Green) – 3:28
5. "Open Your Eyes" (Melody Green) – 4:42
6. "Love With Me (Melody's Song)" (Keith Green) – 3:24
7. "Only by Following Jesus" (Keith & Melody Green) – 3:16
8. "Song for Josiah" (Keith Green) – 6:20
