= I Exalt Thee =

Studio album by Phil Driscoll
- Released: 1983
- Studio: Woodland Sound Studios (Nashville, Tennessee); Mama Jo's Studios (North Hollywood, California)
- Genre: CCM; religious music
- Length: 43:19
- Label: Sparrow Records
- Producer: Phil Driscoll; Lari Goss

Phil Driscoll chronology
Covenant Children (1983)	I Exalt Thee (1983)	Celebrate Freedom (1984)

I Exalt Thee is a 1983 album by trumpeter and singer Phil Driscoll. It was released in 1983 on LP by Sparrow Records. The album was released on cassette in 1988. In addition to its regular CD release, in 1998 Driscoll re-performed and re-recorded the album under his own label, adding another track "I Will Bless the Lord", with the title I Exalt Thee: 1998.

The album received a Grammy nomination for Best Male Gospel Performance. It also garnered Driscoll the 1984 GMA Dove Award for Instrumentalist of the Year, and the album was nominated for the GMA Dove Award for Inspirational Album of the Year. I Exalt Thee reached #15 on Billboard's Inspirational LPs. AllMusic gives the album 4.5 stars.

The album includes three original songs by Driscoll, three standards, and three modern tracks from other songwriters. The title track, "I Exalt Thee", had been written by Pete Sanchez in 1975 and copyrighted in 1976. It was not, however, until Driscoll popularized it with this 1983 eponymous album, that the song and Sanchez gained national and international attention.

The album was the first collaboration between Driscoll and producer, arranger, and songwriter Lari Goss, spawned by a chance encounter at Benson Records. Goss went on to co-produce, arrange, and co-write many of Driscoll's songs and albums, and performed with him live on a number of occasions.

== Track listing ==
=== I Exalt Thee (original album, 1983) ===
1. "I Exalt Thee" (Pete Sanchez) - 7:23
2. "Wings as Eagles" (Phil Driscoll) - 5:30
3. "Let the Whole World Know" (Phil Driscoll, Lari Goss) - 4:05
4. "Our God Reigns" (Lenny E. Smith) - 4:36
5. "Amazing Grace" (John Newton) - 4:10
6. "Hosanna" (Peter Scholtes) - 4:33
7. "El Shaddai" (Michael Card, John Thompson) - 3:55
8. "Everlasting Life" (Phil Driscoll, Lari Goss, Mike Deasy) - 4:18
9. "The Lord's Prayer" (Albert Hay Malotte) - 4:49

== Personnel ==
- Phil Driscoll – vocals, trumpets
- Jerry Cleveland – keyboards
- Lari Goss – keyboards
- Mike Deasy – guitars
- Dann Huff – guitars
- Ricky Keller – bass
- Jim Keltner – drums
- Charles "Buster" Phillips – drums
- Alex Acuña – congas, percussion, timbales
- Laran Philpot – congas, percussion, timbales
- Beverly Baxter – backing vocals
- Terry Blackwood – backing vocals
- Roni Goss – backing vocals
- Donna McElroy – backing vocals
- Sharon Scott – backing vocals
- Melodie Tunney – backing vocals
- Wendy Hofheimer – vocals (6)

== Production ==
- Lari Goss – producer, arrangements
- Phil Driscoll – producer, arrangements, mixing, mastering
- Andy Benefield – engineer
- David McKinley – engineer
- Win Kutz – mixing
- Steve Ford – assistant engineer
- Steve Hall – mastering
- Ken Pennell – mastering
- Future Disc (Hollywood, California) – mastering location
- Stan Evenson – album cover design
- B. Charlyne Hinesley – cover coordinator
- Mark Hanauer – photography
- Marlene Bergman – lyric sheet design

=== I Exalt Thee 1998 ===
I Exalt Thee 1998

Studio album by Phil Driscoll
- Released: May 12, 1998
- Length: 53:46
- Label: Mighty Horn
- Producer: Phil Driscoll; Lari Goss

1. "I Will Bless The Lord" (Tradition) - 4:20
2. "Let the Whole World Know" (Phil Driscoll, Lari Goss) - 6:17
3. "Wings as Eagles" (Phil Driscoll) - 5:46
4. "I Exalt Thee" (Pete Sanchez) - 7:23
5. "Hosanna" (Peter Scholtes) - 4:28
6. "Our God Reigns" (Lenny E. Smith) - 4:59
7. "Amazing Grace" (John Newton) - 4:07
8. "El Shaddai" (Michael Card, John Thompson) - 5:22
9. "Everlasting Life" (Phil Driscoll, Lari Goss, Mike Deasy) - 5:58
10. "The Lord's Prayer" (Albert Hay Malotte) - 5:06
