= Celebrate Freedom =

Studio album by Phil Driscoll
- Released: 1984
- Genres: Country; Folk; World
- Length: 48:50
- Label: Sparrow Records
- Producers: Lari Goss; Phil Driscoll

Phil Driscoll chronology
I Exalt Thee (1983)	Celebrate Freedom (1984)	Power of Praise (1985)

Celebrate Freedom is a 1984 album by virtuoso trumpeter and singer Phil Driscoll. It is an inspirational album of patriotic songs. The album won the 1985 GMA Dove Award for Instrumental Album of the Year. The 1984 release was on LP, and the album was released on cassette and CD in the 1990s.

Cross Rhythms' review of the album stated that "On Celebrate Freedom Phil puts down some vocals as well as his already well established 'Miles Davis eat your heart out' trumpet style." The UK publication also noted Driscoll's "Joe Cocker-ish approach to blue-eyed soul singing".

== Track listing ==
1. "The Star-Spangled Banner" - 2:29
2. "America the Beautiful" - 4:07
3. "Battle Hymn of the Republic" - 6:36
4. "Statue of Liberty" (Neil Enole) - 6:22
5. "God of Our Fathers" - 6:00
6. "I Love America" (Driscoll) - 3:10
7. "We Are His People" (Driscoll) - 6:02
8. "Land of the Free" (Driscoll) - 4:00
9. "America" (Driscoll) - 4:04
10. "E Pluribus Unum" (Driscoll) - 7:11

== Personnel ==
- Phil Driscoll – vocals, trumpet, flugelhorn, arrangements
- Lari Goss – keyboards, backing vocals
- Harlan Rogers – keyboards, organ
- Joe Hardy – guitars
- Hadley Hockensmith – guitars
- Ricky Keller – bass
- Jim Keltner – drums
- James Robertson – congas, timbales
- London National Philharmonic Orchestra – orchestra
- Terry Blackwood – backing vocals
- William C. Brown – backing vocals
- Duncan Sisters – backing vocals
- Roni Goss – backing vocals
- Sharon Scott – backing vocals
- Melodie Tunney – backing vocals
- The Christ Missionary Baptist Church Choir – choir

Production

- Phil Driscoll – producer, mixing
- Lari Goss – producer, mixing
- Joe Hardy – engineer, mixing
- Mike Ross-Trevor – mixing
- Richard Hollywood – mix assistant
- Steve Hall – mastering
- Ken Pennell – mastering
