= Tulsa Youth Symphony =

Nonprofit organization based in Tulsa, Oklahoma

1974 Tulsa Youth Symphony Recording

The Tulsa Youth Symphony Orchestra (TYS) is an Oklahoma nonprofit arts organization founded in 1963 to provide advanced orchestral training and performance experience for young musicians in Northeastern Oklahoma. As of 2016, more than 200 students, ages 8 to 18, participate in the program's two orchestras. The orchestra is composed of students from northeast Oklahoma communities and schools including Tulsa, Bartlesville, Owasso, Sapulpa, Sand Springs, Broken Arrow, Bixby, Coweta, Grove, Oologah, Jenks, and Holland Hall, as well as home schooled children.

== History ==
The Tulsa Youth Symphony Orchestra began as an educational wing of the Tulsa Philharmonic in the early 1960s. In October 1962, Tulsa Philharmonic Society President Burch Mayo appointed a committee of six society board members to explore the possibility of establishing a Tulsa Youth Symphony Orchestra. The committee members included Bonnibel Lester, Betty Bradstreet, C.A. Astle, Herbert Gussman (founder of the Tulsa Philharmonic), Dr. Robert L. Briggs and Gerald Whitney. Briggs was the chair of the music department at the University of Tulsa and Whitney was Supervisor of Music for the Tulsa Public Schools. Mrs. Lester chaired the committee. The board members had extensive ties in the music world - Gussman's friendships included Isaac Stern, Leonard Bernstein, Eugene Istomin, and Jan Pierce. The 78-member youth symphony gave its debut concert on February 15, 1964, in the Tulsa Municipal Theater - now known as the Brady Theater. They performed Howard Hanson's Symphony No. 2. The featured soloist was the orchestra's principal trumpet, Phil Driscoll. A second concert was given May 9, also in the Municipal Theater. In August 1965, Tulsa hosted the National Youth Symphony convention at the Mayo Hotel; Maestro Franco Autori, conducted the convention orchestra. Mrs. Richard Nixon attended a Tulsa Youth Symphony concert in her honor May 13, 1971.

In the fall of 2003 the Tulsa Youth Symphony added another orchestra, the "concert orchestra." In 2016, a preparatory string orchestra was added. Currently TYS has four conductors: Richard Wagner, Symphony Orchestra Conductor; Pete Peterson, Concert Orchestra Conductor; Kenneth Baird, assistant concert orchestra conductor; and Amelia Ivory, preparatory orchestra conductor.

== Chamber orchestra ==
In 1989 the Tulsa Youth Symphony added a chamber orchestra which performed at All Souls Unitarian Church in the spring. This provided an opportunity for the best orchestra members to perform in a small group and to appear as soloists. The youth symphony also provides free children's concerts.

== Conductors ==
The search for a conductor commenced in early 1963, and by April the board had selected Max Waits. Waits was principal flute of the Tulsa Philharmonic and assistant professor of flute and piano at the University of Tulsa. In May, he named as assistants Robert McNally, principal second violinist of the philharmonic, and Mr. Eugene Schweiger, principal cellist of the philharmonic.

Robert McNally took over as conductor in the 1966–67 season, and remained through the 1971–72 season. At that time, McNally was appointed concertmaster of the Tulsa Philharmonic, and Ron Wheeler became youth symphony conductor in the 1972–73 season. Wheeler had been the assistant conductor of the youth symphony since 1970. He was also a violinist in the Tulsa Philharmonic, and production manager of the philharmonic.

Ron Wheeler was conductor and executive director of the Tulsa Youth Symphony Orchestra from 1972 through 2021. He was on the Oral Roberts University music faculty for fourteen years. Mr. Wheeler designed and conducted concerts for young audiences with the Tulsa Philharmonic Chamber Orchestra and the Sunriver, Oregon Music Festival Orchestra, and presented adult educational lectures for the Tulsa Philharmonic, Tulsa Opera, Tulsa Public Library and California State University at Los Angeles. He conducted at music camps and festivals in Oklahoma, Arkansas, Tennessee, California, Oregon, and North Dakota, and is an honorary member of Sigma Alpha Iota International Music Fraternity as a National Arts Associate. Wheeler currently performs as a violinist with the Tulsa Symphony Orchestra.

In March 1981 youth symphony assistant conductor Grant Cooper, a native New Zealander, conducted the American premiere of Aotearoa by contemporary composer Douglas Lilburn, also a New Zealander.

Richard Wagner has been with the Tulsa Youth Symphony since 2002 and is currently music director at Tulsa Youth Symphony and the conductor of the symphony orchestra. He also is the director of instrumental music at Bixby High School in Bixby, Oklahoma, and is in his seventh year as the conductor of the University of Tulsa Symphony Orchestra. Richard has been on the faculties of Oklahoma State University and the Oklahoma Summer Arts Institute at Quartz Mountain.

Earl "Pete" Peterson's is currently concert orchestra conductor. Pete Peterson has served as cellist with the Gettysburg Symphony, Tulsa Philharmonic, Tulsa Opera, Tulsa Ballet, Tulsa Symphony Orchestra and Signature Symphony. He teaches music at Union High School, and led the orchestra in regional and national contests from Branson, Missouri, to Chicago, Illinois, and Washington, D.C.

== Auditions ==
The Tulsa Youth Symphony auditions students in May for the season beginning the following September. Students range from grade 3 through grade 12.

== World Premiere Concerts ==
- 1981 - world premiere of Aotearoa by contemporary composer Douglas Lilburn
- 1985 - Franco Autori, associate conductor of the New York Philharmonic (1949–1959), and conductor of the Tulsa Philharmonic (1961–1971), conducted a piece he had composed for the Youth Symphony

== Tours ==
Over the years the youth symphony has presented concerts out of town, in such places as London, England, St. Louis, Missouri, Los Angeles, California, and in cities in Oklahoma including Bartlesville, Chickasha, Henryetta, Norman, Oklahoma City, Tahlequah as well as Fayetteville, Arkansas. The youth symphony presented its first "Tour Concert" on May 10, 1964, in Bartlesville, Oklahoma.

- 1974 the youth symphony launched its first tour – a four-day excursion to St. Louis, where they had a joint rehearsal with the Ritenour High School Orchestra. One of the highlights of the trip was rehearsing on the stage of Powell Hall, where the St. Louis Symphony performs, with Leonard Slatkin as conductor.
- 1985 the symphony traveled to Los Angeles in June and performed at Disneyland, St. Vibiana's Cathedral in Los Angeles, and had a combined rehearsal and concert with the Los Angeles Youth Orchestra.
- 1987 the orchestra toured England for 10 days, performing concerts in southwest London, at Battersea Town Hall and at the United Reformed Church in Sutton-Coalfield, just outside Birmingham.
- 1989 the youth symphony traveled to Los Angeles for a ten-day tour, and performed at Pasadena High School, Cal. State, and at the Huntington Library.

== Fundraising and sponsorship ==
Funding was initially provided by the Tulsa Philharmonic, and then by the Junior Division of the Tulsa Philharmonic. Since 2003, the youth symphony has been an independent organization, with major support from the Albert and Hete Barthelmes Foundation. All other funds are raised by students, parents and staff or through ticket sales. Rehearsal facilities have been donated by Oral Roberts University.

== Notable alumnae ==
Tulsa Youth Symphony alumni have held permanent positions in many of America's orchestras, including the Chicago Symphony, San Francisco Symphony, Metropolitan Opera Orchestra, and National Symphony, perform on Broadway, serve as educators or specialize in other facets of music. A partial list of alumns active in music includes:

- David McGill, Principal Bassoonist of the Chicago Symphony
- Susan Spector (Laney), oboist with the Metropolitan Opera Orchestra
- Robin McKee, Assoc. Principal Flute of the San Francisco Symphony
- Heather LeDoux-Green, Violinist, National Symphony Orchestra
- Marissa Kuney, Violinist, Ensemble Green
- Eliza James, professional Violinist
- Micheal Deatherage, Cellist, San Diego Symphony
- Charles LeDoux, Cellist, Detroit Symphony Orchestra
- Bruce Schultz, Principal French Horm, Tulsa Symphony
- Tom Sherwood, Assoc. Principal French Horn with the Cincinnati Symphony
- Jason Graae, Broadway entertainer
- Cathy Venable, Broadway Mezzo-Soprano and Pianist
- Phil Driscoll, Christian Music Artist
- Christopher Johnson, director of music and organist, Riverside Church, New York
- Wade Weast, dean of music at the University of North Carolina School of the Arts
- Paul Bryan, dean of faculty and students, Curtis Institute of Music,
- Charles Lawson, professor of clarinet, Colorado State University
- Chad Burrow, assistant professor of clarinet, University of Michigan
- Julianne Kirk Doyle, assistant professor of clarinet, Crane School of Music-Potsdam University
- Sarah Underwood, actress and saxophonist
- Hayden Oliver, violinist

Over the years, graduates have attended The Juilliard School, Curtis Institute, Cleveland Institute, Eastman School of Music, Harvard University, Cincinnati College-Conservatory, Oberlin, Manhattan School of Music, Stanford and other notable universities. Many alumni went on to successful careers in medicine, engineering, finance, education, and energy.

== Awards and recognition ==
Nationally recognized students have included:

- Anne Linebarger, 2012 International Trumpet Guild Young Artist Award
- David McGill, 1983 First Prize in the Fernand Gillet Competition sponsored by the International Double Reed Society

=== Conductor recognition ===
- On January 24, Ronald Wheeler, Tulsa Youth Symphony Orchestra's (TYSO) conductor and executive director, was honored by his peers for a lifetime of leadership in music. Wheeler received the prestigious Lifetime Achievement Award at the Oklahoma Music Educators Association (OMEA) annual convention, in recognition of his outstanding contributions to music education in Oklahoma, and over 40 years leading the TYSO.

=== Orchestra recognition ===
- 2013 Governor's Award for Arts in Education by the Oklahoma Arts Council

== Discography ==
- 1964 - American Youth Performs (RR4M5734) - Vaughan Williams-English Folk Song, Berlioz-Hungarian March, Rimsky-Korsakov-Scheherazade (3rd mvt), Saint-Saëns- Samson & Deliah, others

1964 Tulsa Youth Symphony Recording

- 1974 - Celebration Records (VES716S) - Tulsa Youth Symphony - Berlioz-"Flight into Egypt", Beethoven-Egmont Overture, Rimsky-Korsakov-Cortege from Mladad, Mozart-Flute Cto #2, Bizet-Suite from Carmen, others
