= Songs for the Shepherd =

Album by Keith Green

Studio album by Keith Green
- Released: April 12, 1982
- Recorded: 1982
- Genre: Contemporary Christian music
- Label: Pretty Good
- Producer: Bill Maxwell

Keith Green chronology
| The Keith Green Collection (1981) | Songs for the Shepherd (1982) | The Prodigal Son (1983) |

Professional ratings
Review scores
| Source | Rating |
|---|---|
| AllMusic | 2/5 stars |

Songs for the Shepherd is the fourth studio album released by American contemporary Christian music pianist and singer Keith Green. It is the last album which had been completed prior to his death in a plane crash in July 1982.

== Track listing ==
1. "The Lord Is My Shepherd" (Keith Green) – 4:13
2. "You Are the One" (Keith & Melody Green) – 2:39
3. "How Majestic Is Thy Name" (Keith Green) – 4:02
4. "Draw Me" (Keith & Melody Green) – 3:49
5. "Glory, Lord Jesus" (Keith Green) – 3:20
6. "There Is a Redeemer" (Melody Green) – 3:09
7. "The Promise Song" (Keith Green) – 3:21
8. "Until That Final Day" (Keith Green) – 4:39
9. "Jesus Is Lord of All" (Keith Green) – 2:32
10. "O God Our Lord" (Keith Green) – 3:50
11. "I Will Give Thanks to the Lord" (Keith & Melody Green) – 1:47
12. "Holy, Holy, Holy" (Dykes & Heber) – 3:40
