= Glad (band) =

American Christian a cappella rock group

GLAD
- Origin: Pennsylvania, USA
- Genres: Contemporary Christian
- Years active: 1972–present
- Label: Indie
- Website: http://www.glad-pro.com/

GLAD is one of the pioneers of Christian pop/rock and a cappella music, forming as a progressive rock group in 1972 and discovering a large audience for their a cappella music in 1988. Today, with over 1.5 million albums sold, they continue to perform concerts and release occasional recordings. The Fort Lauderdale Sun-Sentinel noted that when most contemporary Christian music reflected the "showbiz" style of Southern California or Nashville's country or gospel music, GLAD emphasized jazz, rhythm & blues, and fusion. As CCM Magazine described it, "GLAD's elegant vocals helped set them apart from other pioneers of Contemporary Christian music. That vocal sound has since evolved into a complex, self-sustaining life form of its own..."

== History ==
GLAD formed on the campus of West Chester State University of Pennsylvania when singer Ed Nalle auditioned for a new Christian band. Nalle, along with Bob Kauflin, would write and produce much of GLAD's early material while serving as lead vocalist. The other members (from Temple University in Philadelphia) were Kauflin (keyboards, vocals), T. Coble (bass, vocals), Don Nalle (bass and lead vocals), John Bolles (guitar, vocals), and Brad Currie (drums). The group's name was chosen from a poll taken at a shopping mall. Playing over 200 dates annually at college campuses, churches and concert halls throughout the United States, GLAD released their first two albums on Myrrh Records: GLAD (1978) and Beyond a Star (1980). Brothers Wayne Scott Farley (guitar, vocals) and Mark Farley (drums) briefly joined the group to record the latter album, Beyond a Star.

In 1981, the group signed with Benson Records (on their Greentree label) and began releasing albums with different inflections: Captured in Time (1982) was markedly jazzy, Champion of Love (1985) was big and brassy, and Who Do You Love? (1987) offered driving synth rock.

"The Reason" (on Beyond a Star) was their first a cappella song, which they subsequently re-recorded for their watershed 1988 album, The Acapella Project. That album was released with some trepidation because there was no track record for the genre in the Christian market, but it proved tremendously popular, selling over 400,000 copies. Since that time, GLAD has alternated a cappella recordings with more subdued Adult Contemporary albums, the notable exception being 1995's lively Color Outside the Lines, co-produced by industry veterans Mark Baldwin and Joe Hogue for Light Records.

GLAD made a venture into the mainstream later that year with A Cappella Gershwin (featuring arrangements by Gene Puerling), which helped introduce their music to a wider audience. The Charleston Gazette wrote, "GLAD has long been Christian pop music's most sophisticated ensemble... The singing, built around Ed Nalle's uncanny high tenor, has the elegance and sophistication the source material demands."

To date the group has produced twenty-three albums and performed thousands of concerts; additionally, since 1985 they have helped to secure sponsors for thousands of needy children in Third World nations through Compassion International and trips to countries such as Haiti, Mexico, Ecuador, Kenya, Brazil and Indonesia.

GLAD's most recent lineup included Nalle and longtime members Chris Davis (a musician with a background in classical and electric guitar, plus session work in the Northwest) and John Gates (an experienced studio percussionist who backed Gladys Knight & the Pips, Frankie and the Knockouts, and others), plus alternating keyboardists Paul Langford and Don Pardoe. Kauflin and Don Hart are the group's primary a cappella arrangers.

John Gates died on July 8, 2016.

== Discography ==
=== Albums ===
- 1978: GLAD
- 1980: Beyond a Star
- 1982: Captured in Time
- 1983: No Less Than All
- 1984: Live at the Kennedy Center
- 1985: Champion of Love
- 1987: Who Do You Love?
- 1988: The Acapella Project
- 1989: Romans
- 1990: The Acapella Project II
- 1991: The Symphony Project
- 1991: An Acapella Christmas
- 1992: Floodgates
- 1993: Acapella Hymns
- 1995: Color Outside the Lines
- 1995: A Cappella Gershwin
- 1996: The A Cappella Project III
- 1998: A Cappella Worship
- 1999: A Cappella Worship 2
- 2000: Voices of Christmas
- 2002: Pure and Holy Passion
- 2003: God of All Comfort
- 2005: Receive the Glory (The A Cappella Project IV)

==== Compilations ====
- 1987: GLAD: Radio Anthology
- 1994: The Acapella Collection (includes "Prelude 19")
- 1995: GLAD: Right Price
- 1998: GLAD: Collector's Series (2-disc set) (includes "Praise to the Lord, the Almighty")
- 2000: Signature Songs (includes "I Find Your Love Again" and "Always")
- 2005: Simply GLAD

=== Other album appearances ===
- 1977: Scott Wesley Brown; I'm Not Religious, I Just Love the Lord (Instruments and background vocals)
- 1977: Sonship; It Shall Be (Background vocals)
- 1977: Scott Wesley Brown; Songs and Stories (Instruments and background vocals)
- 1988: Al Denson; Al Denson (Background vocals)
- 1989: The Stingers; My Home Isn't in This World ("Psalm 113:1-3")
- 1989: People Of Destiny; Arise and Worship II ("In The Presence", "Faithful God", "Great Is the Lord")
- 1992: Master Pieces: Classic Christian Songs Made New ("Rise Again")
- 1992: Generation 2 Generation ("A Simple Song of Praise" featuring the Children of Compassion)
- 1993: No Compromise: Remembering the Music of Keith Green ("How Can They Live Without Jesus?")
- 1996: Kenny Rogers; The Gift (background vocals on "Sweet Little Jesus Boy")

=== Video ===
- 1990: The Video Project (includes "A Mighty Fortress", "Easter Song", "Just as I Am", "That Hymn Thing", "I Am Not Ashamed", "In the First Light", "Be Ye Glad", "Still on the Side of Love")
