= So You Wanna Go Back to Egypt =

Studio album by Keith Green
- Released: May 7, 1980
- Recorded: 1979–1980
- Genre: Contemporary Christian music
- Length: 40:00
- Label: Pretty Good
- Producer: Bill Maxwell, Keith Green

Keith Green chronology
No Compromise (1978)	So You Wanna Go Back to Egypt (1980)	The Keith Green Collection (1981)

Professional ratings
Review scores
Source	Rating
AllMusic	3/5 stars

So You Wanna Go Back to Egypt is the third album released by American contemporary Christian music pianist and singer Keith Green, released on May 7, 1980.

The album was listed at No. 49 in the 2001 book, CCM Presents: The 100 Greatest Albums in Christian Music.

It includes several notable Christian artists, including Matthew Ward, Kelly Willard, and Bob Dylan playing harmonica.

== Not for Sale ==
This album marked a turning point in Green's career when he realized his principles would no longer allow him to charge money for albums. In 1979, after negotiating a release from his contract with Sparrow, Green initiated a new policy of refusing to charge money for concerts or albums. Keith and Melody mortgaged their home to privately finance the album. The album was offered through mail-order and at concerts for whatever price the recipient was willing to pay. As of May 1982, Green had shipped out more than 200,000 units of his album–61,000 for free. Green continued this policy for the remainder of his career.

The original 1979 promotional flyer included the text:

Keith Green has just recorded a new album, and it will not be available for sale in bookstores or through any of the usual commercial outlets. Pretty Good Records has been given the exclusive right by Keith to give the album away to anyone for whatever they can afford to give in return

The whole reason for not charging a set price for the album is simple: We want everyone, no matter how much they have (even if it's nothing), to be able to hear the ministry of new life in Jesus that springs forth from this powerfully anointed album.

At Last Days, we have always had a burden for the poor. To date we have sent out over a million tracts, thousands of ministry cassette tapes, and every six weeks we send out a newsletter magazine, world-wide, to almost 100,000 people—and we've never charged for any of them. We believe that if the Lord gives you something for free then you should share it freely (Matthew 10:8). The new album is our biggest undertaking yet, and we believe it will reach a lot of people. We don't want anyone to be left out!

We'd really like to share this ministry of music with you, so if you would like a copy of Keith's new album then use the attached coupon, and just give whatever you can afford, as God directs.

We realized that this is a matter of trust. Some have warned us that there will be those who will just use the opportunity to 'get a free album'. But we hope you understand that we're doing this, not so people can get a 'good deal', but simply because it's hard for some people to reconcile paying 8 dollars for a gospel record, when they can hardly afford to buy shoes for their kids!

At some point, after Green's death, this album was offered for sale mainly through the Last Days Ministries web site.

== Making of the album ==
The album was made over a span of several months between 1979 and 1980, produced by Bill Maxwell and Keith Green. String arrangements were by Ralph Carmichael. There were many others who contributed their talents and ministries to the record, among whom are: Hadley Hockensmith, Matthew Ward (from 2nd Chapter of Acts), Kelly Willard, and Bob Dylan who was a close friend of Green's - contributing his harmonica to the track "Pledge My Head to Heaven". Guitarist Kelly Perkins also assisted in playing lead for some of Green's music, including the title song.

== Track listing ==
1. "So You Wanna Go Back to Egypt" (Keith and Melody Green) – 4:38
2. "Pledge My Head to Heaven" (Keith Green) – 3:55
3. "If You Love the Lord" (Keith and Melody Green) – 4:07
4. "Romans VII" (Keith Green) – 3:25
5. "Lies" (Keith Green) – 3:45
6. "I Want to Be More Like Jesus" (Keith and Melody Green/Kelly Willard) – 4:22
7. "Unless the Lord Builds the House" (Keith and Melody Green) – 3:57
8. "Oh Lord, You're Beautiful" (Keith Green) – 4:20
9. "You Love the World" (Keith Green) – 2:38
10. "Grace by Which I Stand" (Keith Green) – 4:53

== Personnel ==
- Keith Green – piano, lead vocals, background vocals
- Bill Maxwell – drums
- Harlan Rogers – organ
- Hadley Hockensmith – guitar, bass guitar
- Alex Acuña – congas and percussion
- Bob Dylan – harmonica
- Kelly Willard – background vocals
- Matthew Ward – background vocals
