= For Him Who Has Ears to Hear =

Studio album by Keith Green
- Released: May 20, 1977
- Recorded: 1976–1977
- Genre: Contemporary Christian music
- Length: 36:26
- Label: Sparrow
- Producer: Bill Maxwell, Keith Green

Keith Green chronology
For Him Who Has Ears to Hear (1977)	No Compromise (1978)

Professional ratings
Review scores
Source	Rating
AllMusic	5/5 stars

For Him Who Has Ears to Hear is the debut release by contemporary Christian music pianist and singer Keith Green, It was released on May 20, 1977. The album photography was taken by Garry Heery with help from Max Blanc in the way of art direction. The album is ranked fifth on CCM Magazine's 100 Greatest Albums in Christian Music.

== Making of the album ==
The album was produced by Bill Maxwell (who played drums as well as other minor instruments on the album) at Studio 55 and was engineered by Larry Emerine, Wally Duguid, Al Perkins and Gordon Shryock. The album was recorded live in the studio with very little overdubbing.

== Track listing ==
1. "You Put This Love In My Heart" (Keith Green) – 3:30
2. "I Can't Believe It!" (Keith & Melody Green) – 3:40
3. "Because of You" (Keith Green) – 2:55
4. "When I Hear The Praises Start" (Keith & Melody Green) – 4:26
5. "He'll Take Care Of The Rest" (Keith Green & Wendell Burton) – 4:00
6. "Your Love Broke Through" (Keith Green, Todd Fishkind, Stonehill) – 3:29
7. "No One Believes In Me Anymore" (Keith & Melody Green) – 3:21
8. "Song to My Parents (I Only Want to See You There)" (Keith Green) – 4:06
9. "Trials Turned to Gold" (Keith Green) – 3:27
10. "Easter Song" (Herring with additional verse by Keith Green) – 3:57

== Personnel ==
- Keith Green – lead & background vocals, piano, acoustic guitar, co-producer
- Bill Maxwell – drums, co-producer
- Todd Fishkind – bass
- Mike Deasy – guitar
- Gary Denton – guitar
- Dean Parks – guitar
- Kenny Kotwitz – accordion
- Harlan Rogers – organ
- James Felix – background vocals
