= Phil Driscoll =

American singer

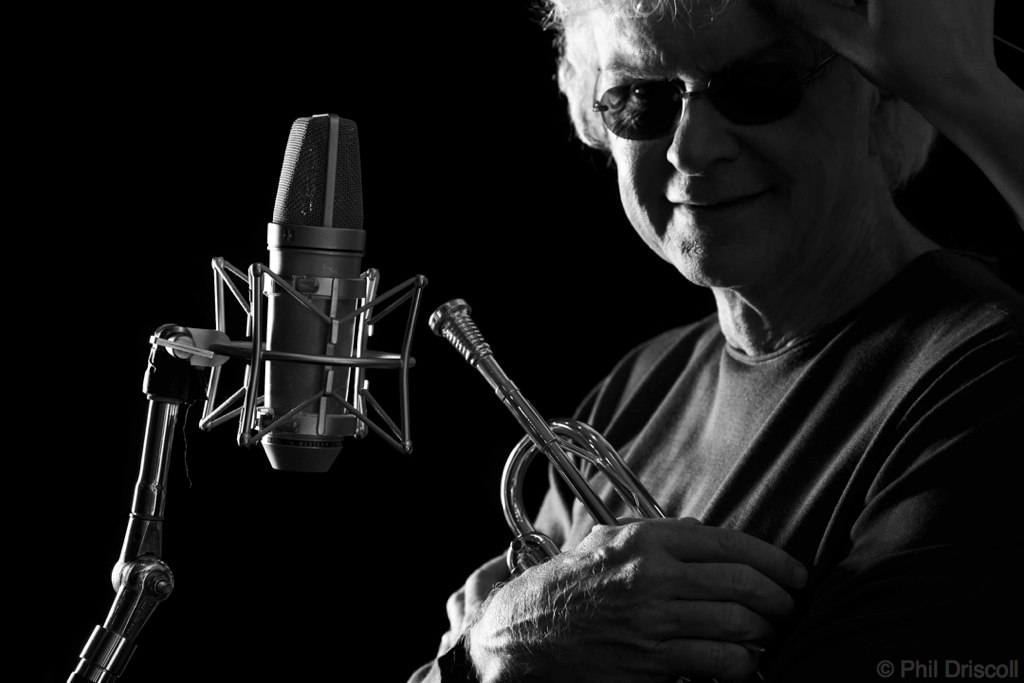

Background information
- Born: November 9, 1947 (age 78); Seattle, Washington, United States
- Genres: Inspirational, gospel, R&B, patriotic, rock, country, pop, contemporary Christian, Christian country, jazz, classical
- Occupations: Musician, singer, songwriter, producer, minister
- Instruments: Trumpet, voice, keyboards
- Years active: 1968–present
- Labels: Phil Driscoll Music Group
- Website: phildriscoll.com

Phil Driscoll (born November 9, 1947) is a trumpeter, singer, composer, and producer. He performs in varying music genres and styles which include rock and roll, rhythm and blues, and patriotic music, and is best known for his work in Christian music and his longterm Christian ministry. In 1985, Driscoll won the Grammy Award for Best Gospel Performance – Duo/Group for a duet with Debby Boone on "Keep the Flame Burning", and he has been nominated for three additional Grammys, two for Best Gospel Performance – Male and one for Best Gospel/Pop Album. He has also won three Dove Awards for his music, and the 1999 Christian Country Music Association Award for Best Musician.

== Early life and education ==
Phil Driscoll was born in Seattle, Washington, and when he was a small child his family moved to Spokane, where his father pastored a small church and his mother played hymns on the piano and organ. Phil played a small plastic trumpet to accompany his father's preaching. When he was five the family moved to Dallas, Texas, where his parents continued their ministry. At six Phil was given a steel guitar, and won many talent contests while still a child.

The family subsequently moved to Lancaster, Texas, where Phil's father became chief of maintenance for the Lancaster school system. Phil began playing the trumpet, and by the sixth grade was performing in the Lancaster High School band. The family moved to Tulsa, Oklahoma in 1959, where Phil's father resumed the ministry. Phil became principal trumpet and featured soloist in the Tulsa Youth Symphony. In high school, he competed in the World Music Festival in Amsterdam, where his trumpet section won best in the world. After high-school graduation, he was lead trumpet in the gospel touring band The Spurrlows. Driscoll then attended Baylor University in Waco, Texas under a music scholarship, where he formed the university's first jazz band.

== Career ==
=== Early career ===
While a sophomore at Baylor University, he was offered a contract by Word Records and recorded his first album, A Touch of Trumpet in 1968, accompanied by the Stockholm Symphony Orchestra. He also won the All American College Show musical competition on CBS, beating out even The Carpenters, and was booked on a USO show touring in Asia. Driscoll also performed and ministered with Billy Graham in Europe. He signed with A&R Records for his secular music, and released the album Blowin' a New Mind in 1970.

=== National recognition ===
During the 1970s, Driscoll performed on national television on the Ed Sullivan, Merv Griffin, Steve Allen, Della Reese, and Arthur Godfrey shows.

In 1972, CBS Records purchased Driscoll's song catalog and gave him a job writing music for Blood Sweat & Tears (for whom he wrote "Rock & Roll Queen" and other songs) and other bands. He also began touring, performing, and songwriting for nearly five years with rock musician Joe Cocker, and authored three of Cocker's songs – "Southern Lady", "Wasted Years", and "Boogie Baby". Driscoll also wrote for and collaborated with artists such as Steven Stills, Leon Russell, Billy Preston, and 38 Special, and performed with ensembles including the London Philharmonic Orchestra. In 1974 he moved to Jacksonville, Florida, where he stayed four and a half years and opened two nightclubs, Driscoll's Disco Nite Club and Driscoll's Nice Place.

=== Inspirational and other genres ===
Driscoll eventually became increasingly dissatisfied with his rock and roll lifestyle, and on Christmas morning in 1977, he and his fiancée became born again Christians. He then focused his talents towards Christian ministry.

==== 1980s ====
In 1980, Driscoll and his family moved to Cleveland, Tennessee. Beginning with Ten Years After (1981), he began recording in the inspirational genre, producing soulful albums whose sound had an appeal to both black and white audiences. He established Mighty Horn Ministries, his contemporary Christian music business, which he also shared on television. In the 1980s Driscoll also played and sang at many of Kenneth Copeland’s ministry conventions.

After several more albums, Driscoll won his first GMA Dove Award in 1984 for Instrumentalist of the Year, and his album I Exalt Thee (1983) received a Grammy nomination in the Best Gospel Performance – Male category. In 1985 he won a Grammy Award with singer Debby Boone for Best Gospel Performance – Duo/Group, for the song "Keep the Flame Burning" from Boone's album Surrender. In 1985 he signed with Benson Records, and in 1986, Billboard magazine ranked him No. 9 in the Top 10 Inspirational Artists.

Driscoll garnered two more Dove Award wins in the mid-1980s – for Instrumental Album of the Year for Celebrate Freedom (1984) and Instrument of Praise (1986). He released an instrumental-only album of hymns, Classic Hymns, in 1988, backed by the London National Philharmonic Orchestra.

==== 1990s ====
In the 1990s, Driscoll produced more than a dozen new albums, mainly in the contemporary Christian genre. He was voted the Readers' Choice Favorite Instrumentalist in both 1990 and 1991 by Charisma magazine. In 1993 he appeared on TNN's Music City Tonight.

In 1996, Driscoll built a recording studio, Most High Studios, on a farm in Tennessee. He also began The Voice of Praise, a television ministry broadcast on the Inspiration Network, and released the album A Different Man, which included the hit ballad "Christ Remains". His 1997 release, Live! With Friends, recorded live and with several other singers and musicians, included a variety of styles, moods, and genres. The album features covers of mainstream hits like "Bridge Over Troubled Water", "You Are So Beautiful", and Bob Dylan's "Gotta Serve Somebody", as well as gospel and praise songs including "His Eye Is on the Sparrow".

Driscoll turned to country music with his 1998 album, Shine the Light. In 1999, he formed his own music label, Phil Driscoll Music Group, with an aim to focus on a wide variety of music styles and crossover appeal in both mainstream and Christian music communities. That same year he was honored as Best Musician of the Year by the Christian Country Music Awards. In the late 1990s, Driscoll's varied touring performances included playing and singing for a tour of Handel's Young Messiah to packed stadiums which seated up to 20,000.

==== 2000s ====
In the early 2000s, Driscoll began a new music and ministry television show, The Phil Driscoll Connection. His early 2000s releases included renovated patriotic albums One Nation Under God (2003) / Spirit of America (2005), "Under Big Top" (2005) and Drops of Praise (2006). In 2004 he also released Vintage, which included Driscoll's versions of over a dozen classic mainstream singles such as "The Power of Love", "Old Time Rock and Roll", "The Dock of the Bay", "Lean on Me", "Stand by Me", "When a Man Loves a Woman", and "Try a Little Tenderness".

In 2008, Driscoll released the album Songs in the Key of Worship, which includes his vocal and trumpet performance of the classic hymn "I Surrender All", accompanied by guitar. He also released the album Here and Now in 2008. Driscoll continues to perform, minister, and work in a variety of media and locations, including completing his film. In December 2009, he performed in Lagos, Nigeria in a 12-hour night of music and worship, with an audience of over 500,000. In addition to his autobiographical film, Driscoll is also completing a music feature film, Symphony of the Universe.

=== Historic and ceremonial national performances ===
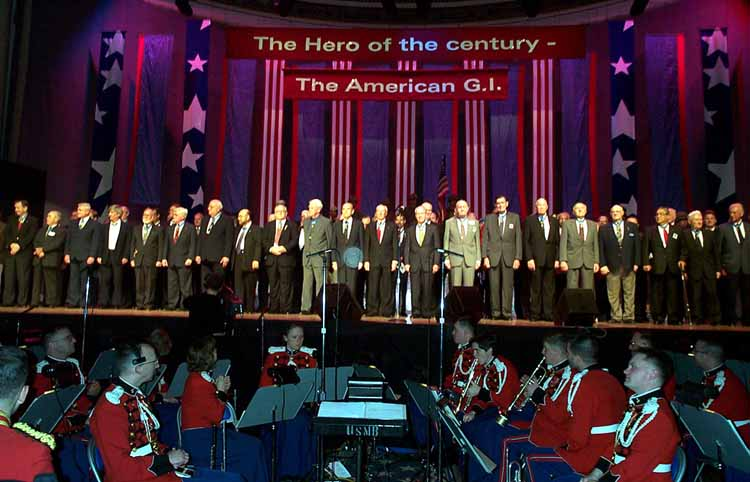
Driscoll performed at the Medal of Honor ceremony in 2000, at the request of Secretary of Defense William Cohen.

Driscoll has performed at the White House for presidents Jimmy Carter, Ronald Reagan, George H. W. Bush, Bill Clinton, and George W. Bush. He performed at Bill Clinton's inauguration in 1993, and at the 1993 lighting of the National Christmas Tree, and sang and played "America the Beautiful" at the dedication ceremony for the Clinton Presidential Center presidential library in Little Rock. Driscoll also performed at the Democratic National Conventions in 1988, 1992, 1996, and 2000.

In the 1980s, Driscoll performed for, made presentations and speeches for, and composed the theme song for President Reagan's Just Say No campaign against drugs. In 1999, at the personal request of Vice President Al Gore, he accepted a key ministry role at the nationally televised memorial services following the Columbine High School massacre; at the memorial, he performed and sang two songs, one of which he wrote specifically for the service. On Presidents Day in 2000, Driscoll sang and played "God Bless America" at the Medal of Honor ceremony, at the request of Secretary of Defense William Cohen.

At the 1984 Grammy Awards he played and sang "Amazing Grace", receiving a "deafening" ovation. And at the emotional post-9/11 Emmy Awards ceremony in November 2001, he received a standing ovation after he played and sang "America the Beautiful".

== Musical style ==
Driscoll is known for his bluesy and varied style, which he also infuses into gospel, inspirational, and patriotic songs. Driscoll's raspy, blues-like voice has been compared to Ray Charles, Joe Cocker and Michael Bolton. His sound ranges from classic rock to country, gospel, patriotic, R&B, pop, and classical styles. He is widely known as being a rare white singer who sings in a convincing black gospel style. As one independent 2006 analysis puts it, "Driscoll has a bluesy-gospel ('soul') style and sings in a course, guttural voice that sounds very much like Ray Charles."

He is noted for incorporating the sound of soul, R&B, rock 'n' roll, jazz, and blues into the inspirational genre. "God's funky too", he said in a 1980s interview, noting that he was keen on eliminating stereotyped opinions about inspirational music. In a 1999 interview for Billboard magazine, he reiterated this, saying, "If you're a football player and you become a Christian, you don't suddenly start playing Christian football." Driscoll incorporated his bluesy, soulful jazz horn-playing and singing into Christmas music in his 1986 album, The Spirit of Christmas, which includes a jazz version of "O Little Town of Bethlehem" played on muted flugelhorn and sung in a slow improvisational jazz style.

== Musicianship ==
Driscoll’s combination trumpet and singing performances are noted for their transitions from trumpet playing to singing to glossolalia, and back again. Driscoll also performs on the keyboard, and on the flugelhorn, and he also performs on the shofar, cornet, and flumpet.

Driscoll's performances and recordings include many mainstream and bluesy works such as "The Long and Winding Road", "You're the Best Thing That Ever Happened to Me", "You Are So Beautiful", "You Don't Know Me", "Georgia on My Mind", "Have I Told You Lately That I Love You?", "You Raise Me Up", and "Amazing Grace". In ceremonial and patriotic performances he is known for his virtuosic and inspirational trumpet and vocal renditions of "America the Beautiful", "God Bless America", "The Battle Hymn of the Republic", and other patriotic favorites.

== Personal life ==
Driscoll married his wife Lynne in 1978. He and Lynne have two children, Jamie and Danielle, and Driscoll has a son, Shawn, from his previous marriage to Patti McDavitt. He married Darlene Bishop in 2018. He resides in Ohio. Driscoll lived in Cleveland, Tennessee from the early 1980s. In the mid-2000s he relocated to Greensboro, Georgia. Driscoll is an accomplished pilot, with commercial, instrument and multi engine ratings.

=== Cocaine Trafficking Indictment ===
In January 1978, Driscoll was one of 32 people indicted by a Texas federal grand jury on charges of being part of a cocaine trafficking conspiracy. Also indicted was actress Linda Blair. Driscoll was arrested after nineteen federal agents surrounded his home during a sting operation stemming from a government wiretap. Following the indictment, Driscoll wrote a letter to the court stating that he had "found God" about three weeks before his arrest, on Christmas Day 1977. Driscoll was charged with three felony counts of conspiracy to distribute cocaine, but was eventually allowed to plead guilty to a misdemeanor charge of cocaine possession. He was placed on probation and his criminal record later expunged. Driscoll said in a 1986 newspaper interview that he was "doing a lot of drugs", and he was reported to have had a $5,000-dollar a day cocaine habit, prior to his religious conversion and subsequent arrest.

=== Tax Evasion ===
In 2006, Phil Driscoll and his wife Lynne Driscoll were indicted in U.S. Federal Court for using their Cleveland, Tennessee-based Christian music ministry in an income-tax cheating scheme, failing to report more than $1 million in income and evading the payment of more than $300,000 in taxes from 1996 to 2000. Also indicted was Lynne Driscoll’s mother, bookkeeper Chris Blankenship, who died just before the trial. The Driscolls ministry took in as much as $2.8 million annually, and according to the prosecution, Phil Driscoll owned an airplane, drove a Porsche, and used money funneled through Mighty Horn Ministries (later renamed Phil Driscoll Ministries and relocated to Eatonton, Georgia), to buy and sell lake houses. Rick Blankenship, brother of Lynne Driscoll and former U.S. Ambassador to the Bahamas, testified on behalf of the prosecution that he had worked for Mighty Horn Ministries until he became concerned that “there was little or no differentiation between personal and ministry expenses." On June 8, 2006, Phil Driscoll was found guilty on 2 counts of tax evasion and one count of conspiracy, and was sentenced to serve one year in Federal prison, beginning on March 14, 2007. Following his release, Driscoll wrote and co-produced an autobiographical film about his experiences, starring Danny Glover and Brian Dennehy.

=== Politics ===
Driscoll performed at an Evangelicals for Trump event in Cincinnati in March 2020. He was also a featured musician at the Democratic National Convention in 1992, 1996 and the 2000 Democratic National Convention.

== Discography ==
=== Albums ===
Year	Album	Peak chart position	Record label	Record producer
1968	A Touch of Trumpet (with Stockholm Symphony)		Word	Ralph Carmichael
1970	Blowin' a New Mind		Word	
1978	Acclaimed and Framed		Dream Records	Phil Driscoll
1981	Ten Years After		Sparrow, Mighty Horn	Phil Driscoll
1981	Ten Years Before (A Touch of Trumpet)		Mighty Horn	Ralph Carmichael
1981	What Kind of Love		Mighty Horn	Phil Driscoll
1982	Sound the Trumpet		Sparrow	Phil Driscoll, Lari Goss
1983	I Exalt Thee	15	Sparrow	Phil Driscoll, Lari Goss
1983	Covenant Children	26	Sparrow	Phil Driscoll, Lari Goss
1984	Celebrate Freedom	33	Sparrow	Phil Driscoll, Lari Goss
1985	Power of Praise	12	Sparrow	Phil Driscoll, Lari Goss, Ken Pennell
1986	Amazing Grace and Other Favorites	23	Sparrow	Phil Driscoll, Lari Goss
1986	The Spirit of Christmas		Benson, JCI Associated	Phil Driscoll, Lari Goss, Ken Pennell
1986	Instrument of Praise	7	Benson, Word	Phil Driscoll, Lari Goss, Ken Pennell
1987	Make Us One	10	Benson, Compose Records	Phil Driscoll, Bill Maxwell
1988	Classic Hymns Vol.1 (with London National Philharmonic Orchestra)		Mighty Horn, Benson, Word	Phil Driscoll, Lary Goss
1990	Inner Man	21	Artful Balance Records	Phil Driscoll
1990	Warriors	12	Mighty Horns, Word, DaySpring	Phil Driscoll
1990	Gabe and the Good News Gang		Mighty Horn, Word	Phil Driscoll, Lary Goss
1991	Classic Hymns Vol.2 (with London National Philharmonic Orchestra)		Mighty Horn, Benson	Phil Driscoll, Lary Goss
1991	The Sound Of Christmas		A Mission In Music (ASCAP)	Phil Driscoll, Lari Goss; engineered by Jeff Stahl
1992	The Picture Changes	28	Word, Curb Records	Bill Maxwell
1993	Heaven and Nature Swing	33	Mighty Horn	Bill Maxwell, Ralph Carmichael
1993	In His Presence		Most High, HeartCry	Phil Driscoll
1994	Selah I		Most High	Phil Driscoll
1996	All Glory All Honor		Most High	Phil Driscoll
1996	A Different Man		Word/Epic	Chris Harris
1996	Selah II		Most High	Phil Driscoll
1997	LIVE with Friends		Mighty Horn	Phil Driscoll
1997	Live Praise & Worship		Mighty Horn	Phil Driscoll
1998	Shine the Light		Mighty Horn	Phil Driscoll, Jimmy Johnson
1999	Simple Song		Mighty Horn	Phil Driscoll
1999	The Quiet		Phil Driscoll Music Group	Bill Maxwell
1999	Plugged In		Phil Driscoll Music Group	Bill Maxwell
2003	One Nation Under God		Mighty Horn	
2004	Vintage		Mighty Horn	Phil Driscoll, Jimmy Johnson
2005	Under Big Top		Mighty Horn	Phil Driscoll
2006	Drops of Praise		Koch Records	Phil Driscoll, Jimmy Johnson
2008	Songs in the Key of Worship		Mighty Horn	Phil Driscoll
2008	Here and Now		Mighty Horn	Phil Driscoll
2017	A Muscle Shoals Christmas		Muscle Shoals	Billy Lawson
2023	Jesus Paid It All (inspired by the motion picture "The Passion of The Christ")		Mighty Horn	

=== Compilations ===
- 1986: Amazing Grace & Other Favorites (Sparrow)
- 1986: The Beginning (Benson)
- 1991: His Best (JCI Associated)
- 1998: Trumpet Voice Heart & Soul (Most High Music)
- 2005: Spirit Of America (Mighty Horn)

=== Video ===
- 1986: The Power of His Presence (Most High Music)
- 1987: The Spirit of Christmas – A Concert Celebration (Mighty Horn)
- 2001: Phil Driscoll Live at Eagle Mountain International Church (Phil Driscoll Ministries)

== Awards ==
- 1985 Grammy Award for Best Gospel Performance – Duo/Group for "Keep The Flame Burning" with Debby Boone
- 1984 GMA Dove Award for Instrumentalist of the Year
- 1985 GMA Dove Award for Instrumental Album of the Year for Celebrate Freedom
- 1987 GMA Dove Award for Instrumental Album of the Year for Instrument of Praise
- 1999 Christian Country Music Award for Best Musician
