= The Keith Green Collection =

Compilation album by Keith Green
- Released: August 11, 1981
- Recorded: 1977–1980
- Genre: Contemporary Christian music
- Length: 46:17
- Label: Pretty Good
- Producer: Bill Maxwell

Keith Green chronology
So You Wanna Go Back to Egypt (1980)	The Keith Green Collection (1981)	Songs for the Shepherd (1982)

Professional ratings
Review scores
Source	Rating
AllMusic	4/5 stars

The Keith Green Collection is the fourth album released by American contemporary Christian music pianist and singer Keith Green. It was released on August 11, 1981. This is also the only compilation album to be released during Green's lifetime.

== Making of the album ==
This album was the first album by Green for which he did not partake in the production as he had with all of his previous releases. Bill Maxwell yet again took up the role of producing the album as he had done with all of Green's prior works. The album was made over a span of several months during 1981.

Most of the tracks on The Keith Green Collection were previously released on Green albums. The exceptions— "Rushing Wind", "The Sheep and the Goats", and "Scripture Song Medley" — were recordings of live performances.

== Track listing ==
1. "Introduction" - 1:02
2. "Rushing Wind" - 3:45
3. "You Put This Love In My Heart" - 3:31
4. "Grace By Which I Stand" - 4:53
5. "You!" - 3:38
6. "Your Love Broke Through" - 3:30
7. "He'll Take Care Of The Rest" - 4:01
8. "Lies" - 3:45
9. "The Sheep And The Goats" - 7:51
10. "Asleep In The Light" - 4:26
11. "Soften Your Heart" - 2:54
12. "How Can They Live Without Jesus" - 3:09
13. "Scripture Song Medley" - 3:48
