= Jesus Commands Us to Go! =

Studio album by Keith Green
- Released: July 20, 1984
- Genre: Contemporary Christian music
- Length: 41:25
- Label: Pretty Good
- Producer: Bill Maxwell

Keith Green chronology
I Only Want to See You There (1983)	Jesus Commands Us to Go! (1984)

Professional ratings
Review scores
Source	Rating
AllMusic	2.5/5 stars

Jesus Commands Us to Go! is the final posthumous album by the American contemporary Christian music pianist and singer Keith Green, released in 1984. The songs were compiled by his widow, Melody Green, using several tracks of previously unreleased material. Instrumental arrangements and production was by Bill Maxwell.

== Track listing ==
1. "Dust to Dust"
2. "A Billion Starving People"
3. "When There's Love"
4. "When I First Trusted You"
5. "Thank You Jesus"
6. "On the Road to Jericho"
7. "Jesus Commands Us to Go!"
8. "Run to the End of the Highway"
9. "Don't You Wish You Had the Answers"
10. "Keith's Piano Prelude"
11. "Create in Me a Clean Heart"
