= Keith Green =

American contemporary Christian musician and songwriter (1953–1982)

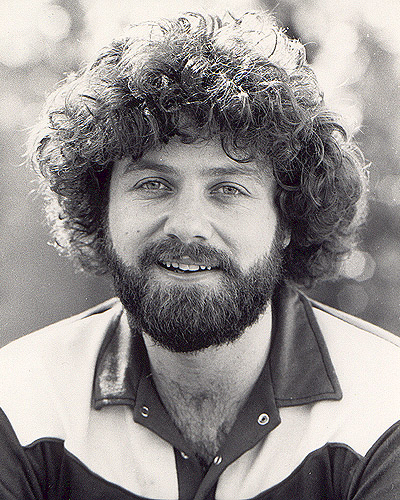

Background information
- Born: Keith Gordon Green; October 21, 1953; Sheepshead Bay, New York, U.S.
- Died: July 28, 1982 (aged 28) Garden Valley, Texas, U.S.
- Genres: Contemporary Christian music, rock and roll
- Occupations: Singer, songwriter, musician, minister
- Instruments: Vocals, piano
- Years active: 1965–1982
- Labels: Decca, Sparrow, Pretty Good Records

Keith Gordon Green (October 21, 1953 – July 28, 1982) was an American pianist, singer, and songwriter. Born in Sheepshead Bay, Brooklyn, New York, he was a child performer and recording artist before turning to contemporary Christian music in the late 1970s.

Following his conversion to Christianity, Green and his wife, Melody, founded Last Days Ministries, through which they combined music with evangelism, discipleship, and ministry to people in need. Between 1977 and 1982, he released five studio albums and, in 1979, adopted a policy of distributing his recordings for voluntary contributions rather than fixed prices and of refusing to charge admission to concerts.

Green died in a plane crash in Texas on July 28, 1982, along with two of his children and nine others. Numerous recordings, compilations, books, documentaries, and tribute albums have been released posthumously.

== Early life ==
Green was born in 1953 in Sheepshead Bay, a neighborhood in Brooklyn, New York. In 1957, his family moved to Canoga Park, Los Angeles, where he grew up. Green's parents were Jewish but practiced Christian Science. The family had a history of musical performance, Green's grandfather (George Bennett) being founder of Jaguar Records in New York, his mother a big-band singer, and his father (Harvey) working with Keith in the music industry in Los Angeles. According to his wife Melody, Green grew up "in an atmosphere of moral purity, free of alcohol and drugs" and said his family's way of life "had a wonderfully preserving effect on Keith during his early years."

Green took to music at a young age, as he "began with the ukulele at three, the guitar at five, and the piano at seven." His talents were noted by a major newspaper when he was eight, following a performance of Arthur Laurents' The Time of the Cuckoo. A local review by the Los Angeles Times wrote, "roguish-looking, eight-year-old Keith Green gave a winning portrayal" of "the little Italian street urchin, Mauro"; another review commented that he "stole the show". The show was Green's first appearance in live theater, which was held in Chatsworth, Los Angeles in September 1962. According to the LA Times, he had already done a number of television commercials and made a TV pilot.

Green played the role of Kurt von Trapp in The Sound of Music starring Janet Blair in the opening production at the Valley Music Theater, a modern 2865-seat theatre in the round in Woodland Hills, Los Angeles when he was 10.

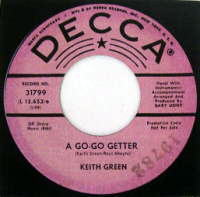
Keith Green's first disc release; the flip side has The Way I Used To Be

In 1965, Green was the youngest person ever to sign with the American Society of Composers, Authors, and Publishers (ASCAP) upon publication of his song, "A Go-Go Getter" at age 11. By age 12 Green had already written 40 original songs, when along with his father and business manager Harvey, he signed a five-year contract with Decca Records in February 1965. The first song released on disc was in May 1965, produced by Gary Usher, the very song he composed and published before signing with Decca.

Decca Records planned to make Green a teen idol, regularly getting him featured in fan magazines such as Teen Scene and on television shows such as The Jack Benny Program and The Steve Allen Show. He was a guest on the television game show I've Got a Secret on May 3, 1965. His secret was "I just signed a five-year contract as a rock-'n'-roll singer." The segment included a live performance of his song, "We'll Do a Lot of Things Together".

Green had written 10 more songs when Time ran an article about aspiring young rock-'n'-roll singers and referred to him as Decca Records' "prepubescent dreamboat". The national attention that had been envisioned by Decca Records failed to materialize for Green, however, as Donny Osmond captured the attention of preteens and teenagers, eclipsing Green's newfound stardom. He was quickly forgotten by the public.

He grew up reading the New Testament and called the mixture of being Jewish and learning about Jesus "an odd combination" that left him open-minded but confused and deeply unsatisfied. As a teen who perceived that his music career had failed, he ran away from home, began smoking marijuana, and used occasional psychedelics in hopes of finding spiritual truth. He became interested in Eastern mysticism and the "free love" culture. His five year spiritual quest eventually led him back to the Christian Bible. A prolific journal keeper, in December 1972 Green wrote, "Jesus, you are hereby officially welcomed into me. Only time will tell."

== Religious Conversion ==
By age 19, Green had stopped using drugs, lost interest in Eastern religions, and started seriously looking into Christianity. In early 1973 he met Melody Steiner, who was also Jewish as well as a songwriter. Becoming inseparable, the couple eloped at The Little Brown Church in Studio City, California, on Christmas Day 1973. The newlywed couple sought more knowledge of Jesus together when, in May 1975, they visited a home bible study in Beverly Hills, California called Vineyard Christian Fellowship. Led by Vineyard founder Kenn Gulliksen, the Greens later said it was during the study that they felt the presence of God through the teaching and guitar-led worship. Hearing the Gospel for the first time and learning about Jesus as a Jewish rabbi, Green and his wife became born again Christians.

== Ministry ==
In 1975, the Greens, newly converted to Christianity, began taking people who needed help into their small home in the suburbs of Los Angeles, in the San Fernando Valley. Both were staff songwriters for CBS Records in Hollywood for two years and used their income to support all who came. Early on, their close friend and Christian recording artist, Randy Stonehill, who was struggling at the time, stayed for a while. Their home was later dubbed "The Greenhouse" – a place where people grow. The Greens continued to open their home but mostly to strangers in need. They eventually ran out of space and, purchasing the home next door to their own and renting an additional five homes in the same neighborhood, they provided a safe environment of Bible studies and practical discipleship to young and old alike. The majority were teenagers and those of college age. Much to the consternation of neighbors, there came to be 75 people living in the Greens' homes and traipsing down the suburban streets—including recovering drug addicts, bikers, a few prostitutes, abused women, and many single pregnant girls all needing shelter and safety. Some were referred to the Greens by other ministries and shelters, but most just crossed their path during their normal life at home and on the road. In 1977, the Greens' personal outreach became a nonprofit ministry they called Last Days Ministries. Green also became an ordained minister, seeing his music as a tool of his ministry.

Green's initial tone of ministry was influenced by the words of Jesus in the Bible. Later, he was also influenced by his friends, authors and teachers Winkie Pratney, and Leonard Ravenhill, who pointed him to Charles Finney, a nineteenth-century revivalist preacher who preached the holiness of God to provoke conviction in his hearers. During his concerts he would often exhort his listeners to repent and commit themselves more wholly to following Christ. Through relationships with Loren Cunningham the founder of Youth with a Mission (YWAM), missions leader John Dawson, and a trip with his wife to overseas missions projects, Green saw the worldwide need for missionaries. He believed that all Christians needed to have at least a brief stint on the mission field. He also realized he was often too hard on growing believers and his assurance of God's unconditional love for him grew as well. This transition is evident in his music beginning with So You Wanna Go Back to Egypt in 1980. He described the changes he went through in his next-to-last article for the Last Days Magazine.

=== Recording ===
Green was signed to contemporary Christian music label Sparrow Records in 1976 and worked on the album Firewind (1976) with Christian artists 2nd Chapter of Acts, Terry Talbot, John Michael Talbot, and Barry McGuire. Prior to Green's signing with Sparrow Records, Keith and Melody wrote "I Don't Wanna Fall Away From You" which was recorded by Tommy James, of Tommy James and the Shondells, for his 1976 Fantasy album In Touch.

His first solo project, For Him Who Has Ears to Hear, was released in 1977 and topped the charts. His second solo release, No Compromise followed in 1978. With no album title, Green took a line from the song "Make My Life A Prayer" written by Melody. She later said in her book about Keith that "No Compromise" seemed to capture the heart of what Keith wanted to say to other Christians—that they needed to quit compromising, stop listening to the voice of the world, and start living committed lives." In 1979, after negotiating a release from his contract with Sparrow, Green initiated a new policy of refusing to charge money for concerts or albums. Keith and Melody mortgaged their home to privately finance Green's next album, So You Wanna Go Back to Egypt. The album, which featured a guest appearance by Bob Dylan on harmonica, was offered through mail order and at concerts for a price determined by the purchaser. By May 1982, Green had shipped out more than 200,000 units of his album often for a few dollars each – and 61,000 totally for free. Subsequent albums included The Keith Green Collection (1981) and Songs for the Shepherd (1982). Some in the gospel industry labeled Green a "kook" for his unorthodox methods, but Green believed he needed to listen to God and practice what he preached. He felt he could not charge $8.98 for a record when the Gospel and salvation were free.

When his music was carried by Christian bookstores, a second cassette was included free of charge for every cassette purchased to give away to a friend to help spread the Gospel.

=== Last Days Ministries ===
In 1978, Last Days Ministries (LDM) began publishing the Last Days Newsletter from the Greens' garage. Originally printed on a few pages of loose paper, the newsletter grew in content to eventually become a "small, colorful magazine" and was renamed the Last Days Magazine. After Keith's 1982 death Melody was appointed to lead the ministry. By 1985 the Last Days Magazine was mailed out for free to over 500,000 people worldwide.

In 1979, the ministry relocated from the San Fernando Valley to a 40-acre (16 ha) plot of land in Garden Valley, Texas, a crossroads community about 9 miles (14 km) west of Lindale, Texas. Within a few years, Last Days purchased additional land, bringing the total to 140 acres (56.7 ha).

== Death in plane crash ==
Along with 11 others, Green died on July 28, 1982, when the Robertson STOL-modified Cessna 414 leased by Last Days Ministries crashed after takeoff from their iron ore airstrip located on the LDM property. The small twin-engined plane was carrying 11 passengers and the military pilot, Don Burmeister, took them for an aerial tour of the LDM property and the surrounding area. Green and two of his children, three-year-old Josiah and two-year-old Bethany, were on board the plane, along with visiting church planters John and Dede Smalley and their six children. Green's wife Melody was at home with one-year-old Rebekah and six weeks pregnant with their fourth child, Rachel, born in March 1983.

The National Transportation Safety Board (NTSB) determined that the crash was caused by the pilot in command (PIC) allowing the aircraft to be loaded beyond its operating limitations. The required preflight weight and balance computations responsibility of civilian pilots would have shown it was dangerously overloaded and also outside its weight and balance operating envelope. This responsibility with military pilots is the responsibility of the military loadmaster, and thus he may have, by force of habit, overlooked this responsibility. Don Alan Burmeister was a former United States Marine Corps aviator, but FAA records show he had very limited experience / training in flying conventional (vs. centerline thrust) twin-engine aircraft. Records show it was only a short time prior to the accident (6/9/82) that he completed a check-ride to remove the "centerline thrust" restriction from his pilot's certificate. This check-ride should have fully evaluated his ability to fly a conventional multi-engine aircraft throughout its designed range of operations, but the flight examiner was decertified the next month (7/10/82) by the FAA due to a "history of incomplete or substandard check-rides". Additionally, the insurance carrier (Ideal Mutual Insurance Co.) required Burmeister to log 1,045 hrs of flying time, attend a Cessna ground and flight training course, as well as log 15 hours in a Cessna 414 (C-414) prior to acting as the PIC of the leased aircraft. The NTSB record shows he failed to accomplish all of these requirements. With pilot and eleven passengers, the aircraft was overloaded by an estimated 445 pounds (202 kg), and the location of the center of gravity was found to be 4.26 inches (108 mm) beyond the maximum aft limit. Combined with an air temperature of 90 °F (32 °C), creating a condition known as "hot and high" (high density altitude, producing a lower climb rate on takeoff and greater danger of stalling), the C-414 could do little but struggle into the air within ground effect, and once airborne was left virtually uncontrollable. These factors prevented the aircraft from ever attaining sufficient altitude, and it crashed into trees less than a mile from the airport.

Keith Gordon Green, Josiah David Green (September 18, 1978 – July 28, 1982), and Bethany Grace Green (February 5, 1980 – July 28, 1982) are interred in the same coffin at Garden Valley Cemetery behind the Garden Valley Baptist Church, less than a half-mile from the LDM property.

=== Last Days Ministries continues ===
Melody Green continued to lead Last Days Ministries from Texas until 1996 when she moved to California and launched Last Days Ministries Online where all of Green's writings are free and his music can be found. The free monthly Last Days Ministries Newsletter is also sent out by request. Melody maintains the Keith Green Music Facebook and @keith.green.official Instagram accounts to honor Keith.

== Legacy ==
Two full albums of original Green songs were released posthumously: The Prodigal Son (1983) and Jesus Commands Us to Go! (1984). Another release, I Only Want to See You There (1983) contained mostly previously released material. A compilation of his recorded work, The Ministry Years, was released as a two-volume set in 1987 and 1988 and included five previously unreleased songs.

Another unreleased Christian song "Born Again" by Keith and Melody was finally released in 1999, 17 years after his death, on the First Love compilation video and CD. Both feature a two-song tribute to Green by other Christian artists.

In 2008, Melody with her grown daughters Rebekah Joy and Rachel Hope partnered with Sparrow Records and released The Live Experience – Special Edition, a CD/DVD combination of 16 live recordings and 4 hours of DVD footage including video of live performances as well as details regarding Green's life and his passing. A greatest hits album was also released at the same time, including 17 of Green's most popular songs and one more previously unreleased Christian song, "Your Love Came Over Me".

On November 23, 2009, the EP Happy Birthday to You Jesus was released, containing a talk by Green about Christmas and another previously unreleased song, "Happy Birthday to You Jesus".

A prolific personal journalist, Green's writings were published as excerpts in the books A Cry in the Wilderness (Sparrow, 1993), If You Love the Lord (Harvest House, 2000), and Make My Life a Prayer (Harvest House, 2001).

=== Tribute recordings ===
In 1992, several artists joined together to re-record many of the Greens' best-known songs for a tribute album called No Compromise: Remembering the Music of Keith Green under the Sparrow Records label. Artists contributing to the recording include Petra, Charlie Peacock, Susan Ashton, Margaret Becker, Michael Card, GLAD, Rich Mullins, Steven Curtis Chapman, Steve Green, and Russ Taff.

In 2001, BEC Recordings released a second tribute record Start Right Here: Remembering the Life of Keith Green. Produced by Derri Daugherty, the album included performances by new contemporary Christian artists MxPx, Joy Electric, and Starflyer 59, among others.

At the 20th anniversary of Green's death, Sparrow Records released another tribute album, Your Love Broke Through: The Worship Songs of Keith Green. The 2002 album contains re-recordings by Rebecca St. James, Michelle Tumes, Chris Tomlin, Twila Paris, Darlene Zschech, Jason Upton, Martin Smith, Charlie Hall, Joanne Hogg, Matt Redman, Paul Oakley, and Sarah Sadler. The album contains contemporary Christian and mainstream artist Michael W. Smith's version of the song "There Is One," an unfinished work by Green. Composition of the song was completed by Smith, along with British songwriter and Christian music artist Martin Smith.

=== Documentary ===
The Keith Green Story - Your Love Broke Through, a 2002 documentary DVD about Green's life, was directed by Daren Thomas with Melody Green as executive producer. Narrated by Toby Mac, it was distributed by Sparrow Records.

=== Film ===
In 2011, Melody Green announced that a feature film about Green's life was in development. After the initial producers failed to exercise their final option to obtain long-term film rights, Melody began to gather a new production team. As of 2013, the film has been under development.

=== Awards and recognition ===
On November 27, 2001, Green was inducted into the Gospel Music Hall of Fame. Melody Green and their daughters Rebekah and Rachel attended to receive the honor for Keith.

On April 3, 2006, Green was honored with the ASCAP Crescendo Award at the 28th annual ASCAP Christian Music Awards presentation dinner. His widow, Melody Green, and their daughter Rachel were present to receive the award for Keith.

On October 3, 2025 The Christian & Gospel Music Museum opened in Nashville, where Green is honored in multiple displays as an artist and modern hymnist. Melody loaned them family artifacts (first album cover shirt, handwritten lyrics, photos, and Green's acoustic guitar).

== Discography ==
=== Career releases: 1965–1982 ===
==== Mainstream recordings ====
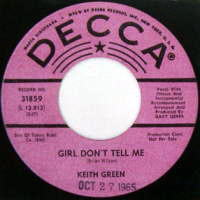
"Girl Don't Tell Me", Decca 31859, released October 1965. The other song was "How to be Your Guy".

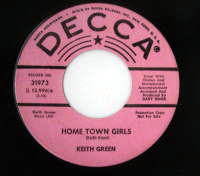
"Home Town Girls", Decca 31973, released July 1966. The B-side song was "You're What's Happening, Baby".

==== Christian albums ====
- For Him Who Has Ears to Hear (May 20, 1977)
- No Compromise (November 9, 1978)
- So You Wanna Go Back to Egypt (May 7, 1980)
- The Keith Green Collection (August 11, 1981)
- Songs for the Shepherd (April 12, 1982)

=== Posthumous releases ===
==== Christian albums ====
- I Only Want to See You There (March 21, 1983)
- The Prodigal Son (August 15, 1983)
- Jesus Commands Us to Go! (July 20, 1984)
- The Ministry Years Volume One 1977-1979 (1987)
- The Ministry Years, Volume Two 1980-1982 (1988)
- The Early Years (1996)
- Best of Keith Green: Asleep in the Light (1996)
- Because of You: Songs of Testimony (1998)
- Here Am I, Send Me: Songs of Evangelism (1998)
- Make My Life a Prayer to You: Songs of Devotion (1998)
- Oh Lord, You're Beautiful: Songs of Worship (1998)
- The Ultimate Collection (DVD/CD release) (2002)
- Live Experience (CD) (April 29, 2008)
- Greatest Hits (April 29, 2008)
- Happy Birthday to You Jesus (November 23, 2009)
- Icon (July 16, 2013)
- 20th Century Masters: The Millennium Collection: The Best of Keith Green (February 3, 2015)
- The Studio Collection 6 CD Box Set (December 12, 2022)

==== Mainstream albums ====
- Keith Green Live (His Incredible Youth) (1995)
- The Early Word (February 13, 2009)

=== Tribute albums ===
- No Compromise: Remembering the Music of Keith Green (1993)
- Start Right Here: Remembering the Life of Keith Green (2001)
- Your Love Broke Through: The Worship Songs Of Keith Green (2002)

== Bibliography ==
(All released posthumously)

- No Compromise: The Life Story of Keith Green by Melody Green (1989)
- A Cry in the Wilderness: Twelve Bold Messages About Uncompromising Faith (1993)
- If You Love the Lord (2000)
- Make My Life a Prayer (2001)
