= Movieguide Grace Award for Most Inspiring Performance =

Annual American movie and television awards

Movieguide gives the Grace Award for the most inspiring performances in movies and TV.

== Winners and nominees ==
Winners are listed first and highlighted in boldface.

Movie Year	Ceremony Year	Winner		Source
1996	1997	**Stephen Collins - 7th Heaven** (Television)		
1997	1998	**Robert Duvall - The Apostle** (Movie)		
1998	1999	**Jim Carrey - The Truman Show** (Movie, tie) **Ian Michael Smith - Simon Birch** (Movie, tie)		
Movie Year	Ceremony Year	Movie Winner	TV Winner	Source
1999	2000	**Richard Farnsworth - The Straight Story**	**Chuck Norris - Walker, Texas Ranger: Episode 8.12: "A Matter of Faith"**	
2000	2001	**Carroll O'Connor - Return to Me**	**Ulrich Tukur - Bonhoeffer: Agent of Grace**	
2001	2002	**Whoopi Goldberg - Kingdom Come**	**Catherine Oxenberg - The Miracle of the Cards**	
2002	2003	**Pierce Brosnan - Evelyn**	**Sean Patrick Thomas - The District: Episode 3.5: "Faith"**	
2003	2004	**Stephen Lang - Gods and Generals**	**Dale Midkiff - Love Comes Softly**	
2004	2005	**Jim Caviezel - The Passion of the Christ**	**Jamie Foxx - Redemption: The Stan Tookie Williams Story**	
2005	2006	**Ulrich Matthes - The Ninth Day**	**Deanne Bray - Sue Thomas: F.B.Eye: Episode 3.19: "Endings and Beginnings"**	
2006	2007	**Oscar Isaac - The Nativity Story**	**Shirley Jones - Hidden Places**	
2007	2008	**Eduardo Verastegui - Bella**	**Bailee Madison - Saving Sarah Cain** (tie) **Abigail Mason - Saving Sarah Cain** (tie)	
Movie Year	Ceremony Year	Winner		Source
2008	2009	**Adriana Barraza - Henry Poole is Here** (Movie)		
Movie Year	Ceremony Year	Movie Winner / Nominees	TV Winner / Nominees	Source
2009	2010	**Albert Hall - Not Easily Broken**	**Kimberly Elise - Gifted Hands: The Ben Carson Story**	
2010	2011	**Kevin Sorbo - What If...**	**Madison Mason - Amish Grace**	
2011	2012	**Alex Kendrick - Courageous**	**Kristin Dorn - A Christmas Wish**	
2012	2013	**Andy Garcia - For Greater Glory**	**Kyla Kenedy - Raising Izzie**	
2013	2014	**James Denton - Grace Unplugged** (tie) **AJ Michalka - Grace Unplugged** (tie)	**Willie Robertson - Last Man Standing** (tie) **Roma Downey - The Bible** (tie)	
2014	2015	**Diogo Morgado - Son of God**	**Imani Hakim - The Gabby Douglas Story**	
2015	2016, Actor	**Ted McGinley - Do You Believe?**; Antonio Banderas - The 33; Sean Astin - Woodlawn; Jon Voight - Woodlawn	**Juan Pablo Di Pace - A.D.: The Bible Continues**; Emmett J. Scanlan - A.D.: The Bible Continues; Joe Dixon - A.D.: The Bible Continues; Gordon Clapp - Chicago Fire: Episode 3.18: "Forgiving, Relentless, Unconditional"; Gerald McRaney - Dolly Parton's Coat of Many Colors; Vincent Kartheiser - Saints & Strangers	
2015	2016, Actress	**Karen Abercrombie - War Room**; Kate Mara - Captive; Juliet Stevenson - The Letters	**Alyvia Alyn Lind - Dolly Parton's Coat of Many Colors**; Jennifer Nettles - Dolly Parton's Coat of Many Colors	
2016	2017, Actor	**Adam Greaves-Neal - The Young Messiah**; Rodrigo Santoro - Ben-Hur; David A.R. White - God's Not Dead 2; Andrew Garfield - Hacksaw Ridge; Josh Brolin - Hail, Caesar!; Robert Pike Daniel - Hail, Caesar!; Cliff Curtis - Risen; Joseph Fiennes - Risen	**Devielle Johnson - Karen Kingsbury's A Time to Dance**; Ted McGinley - Karen Kingsbury's The Bridge Part 2; Gerald McRaney - Dolly Parton's Christmas of Many Colors: Circle of Love; Tyler Perry - The Passion: New Orleans	
2016	2017, Actress	**Melissa Joan Hart - God's Not Dead 2**; Jennifer Garner - Miracles from Heaven; Kylie Rogers - Miracles from Heaven	**Faith Ford - Karen Kingsbury's The Bridge Part 2**; Natalia Cordova-Buckley - Agents of S.H.I.E.L.D.: Episodes 3.20-22: "Emancipation", "Absolution", and "Ascension"; Alyvia Alyn Lind - Dolly Parton's Christmas of Many Colors: Circle of Love; Dolly Parton - Dolly Parton's Christmas of Many Colors: Circle of Love	
2017	2018	**John Corbett - All Saints**; Erika Christensen - The Case For Christ; Oscar Isaac - The Promise; Kevin Sorbo - Let There Be Light; Sam Sorbo - Let There Be Light; Terence Stamp - Bitter Harvest; Dan Stevens - The Man Who Invented Christmas; Mike Vogel - The Case For Christ	**Paul Sparks - The Crown: Episode 2.6: "Vergangenheit"**; Claire Foy - The Crown: Episode 2.6: "Vergangenheit"; Tim Allen - Last Man Standing: Episode 6.18: "Take Me to Church"; Bill Engvall - Last Man Standing: Episode 6.18: "Take Me to Church"; Len Cariou - Blue Bloods: Episode 8.1: "Cutting Losses"; Tom Selleck - Blue Bloods: Episode 8.1: "Cutting Losses"; Jenna Coleman - Victoria: Episodes 1.5 and 1.6: "An Ordinary Woman" and "The Queen's Husband"; Tom Hughes - Victoria: Episodes 1.5 and 1.6: "An Ordinary Woman" and "The Queen's Husband"; Steve Harvey - Little Big Shots: Episode 2.6: "Tiny Dancer"; Michael Kelly - The Long Road Home: Episode 2: "Black Sunday, Part 2"	
2018	2019	**Jim Caviezel - Paul, Apostle of Christ**; **James Faulkner - Paul, Apostle of Christ** (Note: Jim Caviezel won the award, and shared it with James Faulkner); David A.R. White - God's Not Dead: A Light in Darkness; Dennis Quaid - I Can Only Imagine; J. Michael Finley - I Can Only Imagine; Merritt Patterson - Unbroken: Path to Redemption; Samuel Hunt - Unbroken: Path to Redemption; John Krasinski - A Quiet Place; Emily Blunt - A Quiet Place	**Jean Smart - A Shoe Addict's Christmas**; Emily Watson - Little Women; Henry Simmons - Marvel's Agents of S.H.I.E.L.D.: Episode 5.22: "The End"; Chloe Bennet - Marvel's Agents of S.H.I.E.L.D.: Episode 5.22: "The End"; Joanne Whalley - Daredevil: Episode 3.13: "A New Napkin"; Candace Cameron Bure - A Shoe Addict's Christmas; Lori Loughlin - When Calls the Heart: "The Greatest Christmas"	
2019	2020	**Aryn Wright-Thompson - Overcomer**; Alex Kendrick - Overcomer; Cameron Arnett - Overcomer; Tom Hanks - A Beautiful Day in the Neighborhood; Chrissy Metz - Breakthrough; Cynthia Erivo - Harriet; Ashley Bratcher - Unplanned	**Jonathan Roumie - The Chosen: Episode 8: "I Am He"**; Jill Wagner - Christmas Wishes & Mistletoe Kisses; Kathleen Turner - Dolly Parton's Heartstrings: Episode 8: "These Old Bones"; Candace Cameron Bure - Christmas Town; Tobias Menzies - The Crown: Episode 3.7: "Moondust"	
2020	2021	**Britt Robertson - I Still Believe**; Tom Hanks - Greyhound; John Rhys-Davies - I am Patrick: Patron Saint of Ireland; Jim Caviezel - Infidel	**Dolly Parton - Dolly Parton's Christmas on the Square**; Richard Roundtree - Family Reunion: P2E2: "Remember When Daddy Came Home?"; Tom Selleck - Blue Bloods: Episode 10.19: "Family Secrets"; Michael Weatherly - Bull: Episode 4:18: "Off the Rails"	
2021	2022	**Jennifer Hudson - Respect**; Zachary Levi - American Underdog; Dennis Quaid and Jimmy Gonzales - Blue Miracle; Emily Blunt - A Quiet Place Part II	**Bellamy Young - The Waltons: Homecoming**; Greta Scacchi - Resurrection; Bailee Madison - A Week Away; Cynthia Erivo - Genius: Episode 3.1: "Respect"; Jonathan Roumie - The Chosen: Episode 2.8: "Beyond Mountains"	
2022	2023	**Pat Boone - The Mulligan**; Mark Wahlberg - Father Stu: Reborn; Stephen Atherholt - I Heard The Bells; Cary Elwes - Resistance: 1942; Brett Varvel - Running the Bases	**Candace Cameron Bure - A Christmas… Present**; Reba McEntire - My Chains are Gone; Mark Gagliardi - Blood and Treasure; Dolly Parton - Mountain Magic Christmas; Jonathan Roumie - The Chosen: Episode 3.3: "Physician, Heal Yourself"	
2023	2024	**Dennis Quaid – On A Wing And A Prayer**; Khris Davis – Big George Foreman; Forest Whitaker – Big George Foreman; Kelsey Grammer – Jesus Revolution; Joel Courtney – Jesus Revolution; Anna Grace Barlow – Jesus Revolution; Fiona Palomo – Journey to Bethlehem; Joel Smallbone – Journey to Bethlehem	**Lori Loughlin – A Christmas Blessing**; Jesse Hutch – A Christmas Blessing; Colin Ford – A Thousand Tomorrows; Rose Reid – A Thousand Tomorrows; Jason Burkey – Divine Influencer; Lara Silva – Divine Influencer	
2024	2025, Actor	**Joel David Smallbone – Unsung Hero**; Jonas Dassler – Bonhoeffer: Pastor. Spy. Assassin.; Demetrius Grosse – Sound of Hope: The Story of Possum Trot	**Jesse Hutch – Christmas Under the Northern Lights**; Riley Hough – County Rescue: Episode 1.5: "The Rescuer"; Tom Selleck – Blue Bloods: Episode 14:10: "The Heart of a Saturday Night"	
2024	2025, Actress	**Beatrice Schneider – The Best Christmas Pageant Ever**; Cristiana Dell'Anna – Cabrini; Daisy Betts – Unsung Hero; Lupita Nyong'o – The Wild Robot	**Candace Cameron Bure – A Christmas Less Traveled**; Julia Reilly – County Rescue: Episode 1.5: "The Rescuer"; Jillian Murray – A Little Women's Christmas	
2025	2026, Actor	**Mykelti Williamson – The Last Rodeo**; Kelsey Grammer – The Christmas Ring; Oscar Isaac – The King of Kings; Zachary Levi – Sarah's Oil; Paras Patel – The Chosen: Last Supper - Part Two	**Michael Iskander – House of David: Episode 208: "The Truth Revealed"**; Rowan Atkinson – Man vs. Baby: Episodes 1.1-1.4; Trevor Donovan - Christmas at the Inn; Stephen Lang – House of David: Episode 208: "The Truth Revealed"; Tyler Lepley – Ruth & Boaz; Jonathan Stoddard – Crossroad Springs: Episode 1.6: "Sunrise and Still Water"	
2025	2026, Actress	**Naya Desir-Johnson – Sarah's Oil**; Vanessa Kirby – The Fantastic Four: First Steps; Rebekah Schafer – Light of the World; Jana Kramer – The Christmas Ring; Uma Thurman – The King of Kings	**Natasha Bure – Timeless Tidings of Joy**; Candace Cameron Bure – Timeless Tidings of Joy; Erin Krakow – When Calls the Heart: Episode 12.2: "You Get What You Give"; Danica McKellar - Have We Met This Christmas?; Shae Robins – A Christmas Prayer; Serayah – Ruth & Boaz	
