= Movieguide Epiphany Prize for Most Inspiring TV or Streaming Movie or Program =

Annual American television award

The Movieguide Awards give the Epiphany Prize for Most Inspiring TV or Streaming Movie or Program to programs that are wholesome, spiritually uplifting and inspirational.

== Winners and nominees ==
Winners are listed first and highlighted in boldface.

This category debuted in the fourth year of the Movieguide Awards. The prior years only gave awards for best movies for families and mature audiences.

TV Year	Ceremony Year	Winning Film	Source
1995	1996	**Christy: Episode 2.4: "The Hunt"**	
1996	1997	**Touched by an Angel**	
1997	1998	**Walker, Texas Ranger: Episode 5.22: "The Neighborhood"**	
1998	1999	**7th Heaven**	
1999	2000	**Second Sight**	
2000	2001	**The Miracle Maker**	
2001	2002	**The Miracle of the Cards**	
2002	2003	**Doc: Episode 3.5: "Nobody"**	
2003	2004	**Love Comes Softly**	
2004	2005	**Doc: Episode 5.8: "Happy Trails"**	
2005	2006	**7th Heaven: Episode 10.11 "X-Mas"**	
2006	2007	**The Ten Commandments**	
2007	2008	**The Valley of Light**	
2008	2009	**The Christmas Choir**	
2009	2010	**Gifted Hands: The Ben Carson Story**	
2010	2011	**Amish Grace**	
2011	2012	**KJB: The Book That Changed the World**	
2012	2013	**The American Bible Challenge: Pilot Episode**	
2013	2014	**The Bible**	
2014	2015	**Love Finds You in Sugarcreek, Ohio**	
2015	2016	**Dolly Parton's Coat of Many Colors**; A.D.: The Bible Continues; Ancient Roads from Christ to Constantine; Blue Bloods: Episode 6.9: "Hold Outs"; Chicago Fire: Episode 3.18: "Forgiving, Relentless, Unconditional"; Saints & Strangers	
2016	2017	**Dolly Parton's Christmas of Many Colors: Circle of Love**; Agents of S.H.I.E.L.D.: Episodes 3.20-22: "Emancipation", "Absolution", and "Ascension"; Karen Kingsbury's The Bridge Part 2; Operation Christmas; The Passion: New Orleans; Pocahontas: Dove of Peace; Karen Kingsbury's A Time to Dance	
2017	2018	**The Long Road Home: Episode 2: "Black Sunday, Part 2"**; Blue Bloods: Episode 8.1: "Cutting Losses"; The Crown: Episode 2.6: "Vergangenheit"; Last Man Standing: Episode 6.18: "Take Me to Church"; Little Big Shots: Episode 2.6: "Tiny Dancer"; Victoria: Episodes 1.5 and 1.6: "An Ordinary Woman" and "The Queen's Husband"	
2018	2019	**When Calls the Heart: "The Greatest Christmas Blessing"**; Billy Graham: An Extraordinary Journey; Marvel's Agents of S.H.I.E.L.D.: Episode 5.22: "The End"; Daredevil: Episode 3.13: "A New Napkin"; Medal of Honor: Episode 4: "Hiroshi Hershey Miyamura"; Elvis Presley: The Searcher: Part I and Part II; A Shoe Addict's Christmas; Manifest: Pilot Episode	
2019	2020	**Christmas Wishes & Mistletoe Kisses**; The Chosen: Episode 8: "I Am He"; A Christmas Love Story; Christmas Town; The Crown: Episode 3.7: "Moondust"; Dolly Parton's Heartstrings: Episode 8: "These Old Bones"; Jesus: His Life: Episode 1: "Joseph: The Nativity"; Last Man Standing: Episode 7.19: "The Passion of Paul"; When Calls the Heart: "Home for Christmas"	
2020	2021	**Bull: Episode 4:18: "Off the Rails"**; Blue Bloods: Episode 10.19: "Family Secrets"; The Clark Sisters: First Ladies of Gospel; Country Ever After: Episode 1.1: "Meet the Andersons"; Family Reunion: P2E2: "Remember When Daddy Came Home?"; The Good Doctor: Episode 3.20: "I Love You"; Miracle on Christmas	
2021	2022	**The Waltons: Homecoming**; The Chosen: Episode 2.8: "Beyond Mountains"; Genius: Aretha: Episode 3.1: "Respect"; The Pilgrims; Resurrection; Percy vs. Goliath	
2022	2023	**Dolly Parton's Mountain Magic Christmas**; Blood and Treasure: Season Two; A Christmas… Present; The Lord of the Rings: The Rings of Power: Episode 1.8: "Alloyed"; Rise	
2023	2024	**Divine Influencer**; A Paris Christmas Waltz; A Christmas Blessing; A Thousand Tomorrows: Episodes 1.1-1.3: "Untouchable," "Hooked," and "What No One Knows"; Murf the Surf: Jewels, Jesus and Mayhem in the USA: Episodes 1.1-1.4: "The Heist," "Another Level of Madness," "God’s Business," and "The Truth Bends"	
2024	2025	**A Christmas Less Traveled**; The Baxters: Episodes 1.1-1.8; Christmas Under the Northern Lights; County Rescue: Episode 1.5: "The Rescuer"; A Little Women's Christmas	
2025	2026	**A Christmas Prayer‡**; The Chosen Adventures: Episodes 1.1-1.6; House of David: Episode 208: "The Truth Revealed"; Man vs. Baby: Episodes 1.1-1.4; When Calls the Heart: Episode 12.2: "You Get What You Give"	
