= Movieguide Epiphany Prize for Most Inspiring Movie =

Annual American movie award

The Movieguide Awards give the Epiphany Prize for Inspiring Movies to movies that are wholesome, spiritually uplifting and inspirational.

== Winners and nominees ==
Winners are listed first and highlighted in boldface.

This category debuted in the fourth year of the Movieguide Awards. The prior years only gave awards for best movies for families and mature audiences.

Movie Year	Ceremony Year	Winning Film	Source
1995	1996	**Dead Man Walking**	
1996	1997	**The Preacher's Wife**	
1997	1998	**Amistad**	
1998	1999	**The Prince of Egypt**	
1999	2000	**The Winslow Boy**	
2000	2001	**Return to Me**	
2001	2002	**The Body**	
2002	2003	**Evelyn**	
2003	2004	**The Gospel of John**	
2004	2005	**The Passion of the Christ**	
2005	2006	**The Chronicles of Narnia: The Lion, the Witch and the Wardrobe**	
2006	2007	**The Nativity Story**	
2007	2008	**Amazing Grace**	
2008	2009	**Fireproof**	
2009	2010	**The Blind Side**	
2010	2011	**The Chronicles of Narnia: The Voyage of the Dawn Treader**	
2011	2012	**Courageous**	
2012	2013	**Les Misérables**	
2013	2014	**Grace Unplugged**	
2014	2015	**God's Not Dead**	
2015	2016	**War Room**; The 33; Brooklyn; Captive; Do You Believe?; Manny; Woodlawn	
2016	2017	**The Young Messiah**; Ben-Hur; God's Not Dead 2; Hacksaw Ridge; Hail, Caesar!; Miracles from Heaven; Risen; Silence	
2017	2018	**The Star**; All Saints; Bitter Harvest; The Boss Baby; The Case for Christ; Let There Be Light; The Promise	
2018	2019	**I Can Only Imagine**; God's Not Dead: A Light in Darkness; Paul, Apostle of Christ; The Grinch; Unbroken: Path to Redemption	
2019	2020	**Overcomer**; A Beautiful Day in the Neighborhood; Breakthrough; Harriet; A Hidden Life	
2020	2021	**I Still Believe**; Created Equal: Clarence Thomas in his Own Words; Greyhound; I am Patrick: Patron Saint of Ireland; News of the World; Infidel; Waiting for Anya	
2021	2022	**Blue Miracle**; American Underdog; The Most Reluctant Convert; Christmas with The Chosen: The Messengers; The Girl Who Believes in Miracles; King Richard; A Quiet Place Part II	
2022	2023	**The Chosen: Episodes 3.1 and 3.2: "Homecoming" and "Two by Two"**; Father Stu: Reborn; Resistance: 1942; Running the Bases; Uncharted	
2023	2024	**Journey to Bethlehem**; After Death; Big George Foreman; On a Wing and a Prayer; Jesus Revolution	
2024	2025	**Cabrini**; The Best Christmas Pageant Ever; Sound of Hope: The Story of Possum Trot; Transformers One; Unsung Hero	
2025	2026	**The Chosen: Last Supper - Part Two‡**; The Christmas Ring; David; The King of Kings; Light of the World	
