= 2022 Movieguide Awards =

Annual American movie and television awards

The 2022 Movieguide Awards ceremony honored the best films and television of 2021.

== Winners and nominees ==
Winners are listed first, highlighted in boldface, and indicated with a double dagger (‡).

**Epiphany Prize for Most Inspiring Movie** - Honoring movies that are wholesome, spiritually uplifting and inspirational	**Epiphany Prize for Most Inspiring TV or Streaming Movie or Program**
**Blue Miracle**‡; American Underdog; The Most Reluctant Convert; Christmas with The Chosen: The Messengers; The Girl Who Believes in Miracles; King Richard; A Quiet Place Part II	**The Waltons: Homecoming**‡; The Chosen: Episode 2.8: "Beyond Mountains"; Genius: Aretha: Episode 3.1: "Respect"; The Pilgrims; Resurrection; Percy vs. Goliath
**Faith and Freedom Award for Movies** - Honoring movies that promote positive American values	**Faith and Freedom Award for Television and Streaming**
**A Quiet Place Part II**‡; Black Widow; The Boss Baby: Family Business; The Courier; Dear Comrades!; Dune; God's Not Dead: We the People; Percy vs. Goliath	**Superman and Lois: Episode 101: "Pilot"**‡; Atlantic Crossing: Episodes 1 and 2: "Angrepet" and "Tronefall"; Hawkeye: Episodes 1.1 and 1.2: "Never Meet Your Heroes" and "Hide and Seek"; The Mysterious Benedict Society: Episodes 1.1 and 1.2: "A Bunch Of Smart Orphans" and "Carrying A Bird"; The Pilgrims; Turner and Hooch: Episode 1.1: "Forever and a Dog"; The Waltons: Homecoming
**Best Movie for Families**	**Best Movie for Mature Audiences**
**The Boss Baby: Family Business**‡; American Underdog; Blue Miracle; Peter Rabbit 2: The Runaway; Ron's Gone Wrong; Sing 2; Space Jam: A New Legacy	**Dune**‡; Belfast; Black Widow; Cyrano; Infidel; King Richard; A Quiet Place Part II
**Grace Award for Most Inspiring Performance for Movies**	**Grace Award for Most Inspiring Performance for TV**
**Jennifer Hudson - Respect**‡; Zachary Levi - American Underdog; Dennis Quaid and Jimmy Gonzales - Blue Miracle; Emily Blunt - A Quiet Place Part II	**Bellamy Young - The Waltons: Homecoming**‡; Greta Scacchi - Resurrection; Bailee Madison - A Week Away; Cynthia Erivo - Genius: Episode 3.1: "Respect"; Jonathan Roumie - The Chosen: Episode 2.8: "Beyond Mountains"
