= Movieguide Award for Best Movie for Families =

Annual American movie award

Every year Movieguide gives an award to the Best Movie for Families. In 2026 they added a separate category for Best Movie for Children.

== Winners and nominees ==
Winners are listed first and highlighted in boldface.

Movie Year	Ceremony Year	Winner / Nominees	Source
1992	1993	**The Muppet Christmas Carol**	
1993	1994	**Homeward Bound: The Incredible Journey**	
1994	1995	**Little Women**	
1995	1996	**Toy Story**	
1996	1997	**The Preacher's Wife**	
1997	1998	**Air Bud**	
1998	1999	**The Prince of Egypt**	
1999	2000	**Toy Story 2**	
2000	2001	**The Basket**	
2001	2002	**The Princess Diaries**	
2002	2003	**Spider-Man**	
2003	2004	**Finding Nemo**	
2004	2005	**The Incredibles**	
2005	2006	**The Chronicles of Narnia: The Lion, the Witch, and the Wardrobe**	
2006	2007	**Charlotte's Web**	
2007	2008	**Ratatouille**	
2008	2009	**Wall-E**	
2009	2010	**Up**	
2010	2011	**Toy Story 3**	
2011	2012	**Soul Surfer**	
2012	2013	**Ice Age: Continental Drift**	
2013	2014	**Frozen**	
2014	2015	**Heaven is for Real**	
2015	2016	**Home**; Cinderella; The Good Dinosaur; Inside Out; Max; Paddington; The Peanuts Movie; Shaun The Sheep Movie; The SpongeBob Movie: Sponge Out of Water; War Room	
2016	2017	**Miracles from Heaven**; Finding Dory; The Jungle Book; Pete's Dragon; Queen of Katwe; The Secret Life of Pets; Sing; Trolls; The Young Messiah; Zootopia	
2017	2018	**The Boss Baby**; Cars 3; The Case For Christ; Despicable Me 3; The Emoji Movie; Ferdinand; The Lego Batman Movie; The Man Who Invented Christmas; Smurfs: The Lost Village; The Star	
2018	2019	**The Grinch**; God's Not Dead: A Light in Darkness; I Can Only Imagine; Incredibles 2; Mary Poppins Returns; Paddington 2; Paul, Apostle of Christ; Peter Rabbit; Ralph Breaks the Internet; Spider-Man: Into the Spider-Verse	
2019	2020	**The Lego Movie 2: The Second Part**; Apollo 11; Breakthrough; Dumbo; How to Train Your Dragon: The Hidden World; The Least of These: The Graham Staines Story; The Lion King; Overcomer; The Pilgrim's Progress; Toy Story 4	
2020	2021	**Safety**; The Croods: A New Age; I am Patrick: Patron Saint of Ireland; Jingle Jangle: A Christmas Journey; Onward; Red Shoes and the Seven Dwarfs; A Shaun the Sheep Movie: Farmageddon; The Social Dilemma; Sonic the Hedgehog; StarDog and TurboCat	
2021	2022	**The Boss Baby: Family Business**; American Underdog; Blue Miracle; Peter Rabbit 2: The Runaway; Ron's Gone Wrong; Sing 2; Space Jam: A New Legacy	
2022	2023	**Puss in Boots: The Last Wish** (tie); **Sonic The Hedgehog 2** (tie); The Chosen: Episodes 3.1 and 3.2: "Homecoming" and "Two by Two"; Lyle, Lyle Crocodile; Marcel the Shell With Shoes On	
2023	2024	**The Super Mario Bros. Movie**; Wonka; Trolls Band Together; Journey to Bethlehem; Spider-Man: Across the Spider-Verse	
2024	2025	**The Best Christmas Pageant Ever**; Despicable Me 4; Inside Out 2; Mufasa: The Lion King; The Wild Robot	
2025	2026	For Children: **Light of the World**; The King of Kings; Lilo & Stitch; Paddington in Peru; Zootopia 2; For Families: **The Last Rodeo**; The Chosen: Last Supper - Part Two; The Christmas Ring; David; The Senior	
