= The Nativity Story =

- Theatrical release poster
- Directed by: Catherine Hardwicke
- Written by: Mike Rich
- Produced by: Wyck Godfrey; Marty Bowen
- Starring: Keisha Castle-Hughes; Oscar Isaac; Hiam Abbass; Shaun Toub; Alexander Siddig; Ciarán Hinds; Shohreh Aghdashloo
- Cinematography: Elliot Davis
- Edited by: Robert K. Lambert; Stuart Levy
- Music by: Mychael Danna
- Production company: Temple Hill Entertainment
- Distributed by: New Line Cinema
- Release dates: November 26, 2006 (Vatican City); December 1, 2006 (United States)
- Running time: 101 minutes
- Country: United States
- Languages: English; Hebrew
- Budget: $35 million
- Box office: $46.4 million

The Nativity Story is a 2006 American biblical drama film based on the nativity of Jesus and directed by Catherine Hardwicke. The film stars Keisha Castle-Hughes, Oscar Isaac, Hiam Abbass, Shaun Toub, Alexander Siddig, Ciarán Hinds, and Shohreh Aghdashloo.

The Nativity Story premiered in Vatican City on November 26, 2006, making it the first film to hold a world premiere in the city, and was released in the United States on December 1, 2006, by New Line Cinema. The film received mixed reviews from critics and grossed over $46 million worldwide.

== Plot ==
In the Roman province of Judea, rabbi Zechariah has a vision of the Annunciation and the coming birth of the Messiah, which leaves him unable to speak. One year later, Herod the Great orders that all young boys be massacred in Judea, extending to Nazareth, where 14-year-old Mary lives with her family and is betrothed to Joseph. Despite the people of Nazareth living simple lives, high taxes are enforced on them; one man, unable to pay, has a third of his land seized and his daughter pressed into debt slavery.

Mary is visited by the Archangel Gabriel, who tells her she will give birth to the son of God; he also informs her that her cousin Elizabeth will also become pregnant, despite her old age. Mary subsequently visits Elizabeth, the wife of Zechariah, who gives birth to a boy she names John, whose birth sees Zechariah regain his speech. Mary discovers she is pregnant, to the shock of Joseph and her parents, who fear that Joseph will accuse her of adultery, a sin punishable by death through stoning according to the Torah. Joseph does not believe Mary's explanation, and remains angry until he is visited in a dream by the Archangel, who tells him of God's plan for Mary's son and to take Mary as his wife.

Meanwhile, Emperor Augustus has demanded that every man across the Empire return with his family to his place of birth for the census. As a direct descendant of King David, Joseph is forced to travel 110 kilometers (68 mi) across Judea from Nazareth to his native homeland, Bethlehem. With Mary on a donkey laden with supplies, the couple spend weeks travelling to Bethlehem; upon arriving, Mary goes into labor and Joseph seeks a place for her to give birth. Unable to find anywhere available due to amount of people travelling, an innkeeper offers his stable to the couple.

Meanwhile, three Magi—Caspar, Melchior, and Balthasar—discover three planets will align to form a great star, which the Archangel tells them will reveal the location of the Messiah. The Magi inform Herod of this and Herod asks them to visit the newborn Messiah and report the child's location back to him, under the pretense that he will go to visit the child in person.

The Magi follow the path of the star and arrive at the stable, where local shepherds have gathered to witness Mary give birth to a son, Jesus; the Magi presenting the infant with gifts of gold, frankincense, and myrrh. Aware that Herod intends to kill the baby out of fear of being usurped, the Magi return home by a different route. Herod realizes the Magi's deviation and orders the death of every boy in Bethlehem under the age of two. Soldiers descend on Bethlehem, where they find the stable empty, as Joseph was warned of the coming danger in a dream and he, Mary and Jesus flee to Egypt.

== Cast ==
- Oscar Isaac as Joseph
- Keisha Castle-Hughes as Mary
- Hiam Abbass as Anna
- Shaun Toub as Joachim
- Ciarán Hinds as Herod the Great
- Shohreh Aghdashloo as Elizabeth
- Stanley Townsend as Zechariah
- Alexander Siddig as the Angel Gabriel
- Eriq Ebouaney as Balthasar
- Alessandro Giuggioli as Herod Antipas
- Nadim Sawalha as Melchior
- Stefan Kalipha as Caspar
- Shelby Young as Naomi (voice) (uncredited)

== Production ==
In January 2006, it was reported that New Line Cinema had acquired Nativity, a spec script based on the Nativity of Jesus centering on the virgin Mary by Mike Rich for development. Rich began writing the script in 2004 after seeing covers Time and Newsweek about the Nativity and feeling the story's themes of faith and hope as being timeless. The success of Mel Gibson's The Passion of the Christ helped the film secure financial backing. New Line had hired Catherine Hardwicke to direct Nativity with the intention of fast tracking it for release during the holiday season of that year.

In March 2006, Keisha Castle-Hughes had been cast as Mary. That same month, Shohreh Aghdashloo was cast as Elizabeth, mother of John the Baptist. By May, Oscar Isaac had been cast as Joseph and Alexander Siddig as the Archangel Gabriel. The film was seen as part of a wave by Hollywood studios to try and cater to Christian audiences following the success of The Passion of the Christ. Walt Disney Pictures had previously begun production of The Chronicles of Narnia: The Lion, the Witch and the Wardrobe and Sony's had optioned The Da Vinci Code (though which was noted to be more questioning of Divinity).

The film was shot in Matera, Craco, Cinecittà in Italy and Ouarzazate in Morocco.

During filming it was discovered that Keisha Castle-Hughes had become pregnant at the age of sixteen.

== Reception ==
=== Box office ===
The Nativity Story opened to a modest first weekend at the domestic box office by grossing $7.8 million, with a 39% increase over the extended Christmas weekend. After its initial run, the film closed out with about $37.6 million in domestic gross and $8.8 million in foreign gross, resulting in a worldwide total of almost $46.4 million on a reported $35 million budget.

=== Critical response ===
The Nativity Story received mixed reviews. As of June 2020, the film holds a 37% approval rating on the review aggregator Rotten Tomatoes, based on 131 reviews with an average rating of 5.29/10. The site's consensus says, "The Nativity Story is a dull retelling of a well-worn tale with the look and feel of a high-school production." Metacritic, which assigns a weighted average score out of 100 to reviews from mainstream critics, gives the film a score of 52 based on 28 reviews.

A. O. Scott of The New York Times gave the film a positive review saying, "At its best, The Nativity Story shares with Hail Mary an interest in finding a kernel of realism in the old story of a pregnant teenager in hard times. Buried in the pageantry, in other words, is an interesting movie." Ann Hornaday of The Washington Post concluded a positive review of the film stating, "The most intriguing thing about The Nativity Story transpires during the couple's extraordinary personal journey, advancing a radical idea in an otherwise long slog of a cinematic Sunday school lesson: that Jesus became Who He was not only because He was the Son of God, but because He was the son of a good man."

Conversely, many critics felt that the film did not take the story to new cinematic heights. Owen Gleiberman of Entertainment Weekly noted, "The Nativity Story is a film of tame picture-book sincerity, but that's not the same thing as devotion. The movie is too tepid to feel, or see, the light." Kenneth Turan of the Los Angeles Times said, "This is not a chance to 'experience the most timeless of stories as you've never seen it before' but just the opposite: an opportunity, for those who want it, to encounter this story exactly the way it's almost always been told."

== Music ==
Mychael Danna's score of the film was released as an album on December 5, 2006. An album of songs inspired by the film was also released under the title The Nativity Story: Sacred Songs. It featured music by artists like Point of Grace, Amy Grant, Jaci Velasquez, and others.

== Accolades ==
Award	Category	Recipient	Result	Year	Ref
Young Artist Awards	Best Performance in a Feature Film - Leading Young Actress	Keisha Castle-Hughes	Nominated	2007	
Movieguide Awards	Epiphany Prize for Most Inspiring Movie		Won	2007	
Movieguide Awards	Grace Award for Most Inspiring Performance	Oscar Isaac	Won	2007	
GMA Dove Award	Instrumental Album of the Year	Mychael Danna	Nominated	2008	

== See also ==
- List of Christmas films
- List of films about angels
