= 2021 Movieguide Awards =

Annual American movie and television awards

The 2021 Movieguide Awards ceremony honored the best films and television of 2020.

== Winners and nominees ==
Winners are listed first, highlighted in boldface, and indicated with a double dagger (‡).

**Epiphany Prize for Most Inspiring Movie** - Honoring movies that are wholesome, spiritually uplifting and inspirational	**Epiphany Prize for Most Inspiring TV or Streaming Movie or Program**
**I Still Believe**‡; Created Equal: Clarence Thomas in his Own Words; Greyhound; I am Patrick: Patron Saint of Ireland; News of the World; Infidel; Waiting for Anya	**Bull: Episode 4:18: "Off the Rails"**‡; Blue Bloods: Episode 10.19: "Family Secrets"; The Clark Sisters: First Ladies of Gospel; Country Ever After: Episode 1.1: "Meet the Andersons"; Family Reunion: P2E2: "Remember When Daddy Came Home?"; The Good Doctor: Episode 3.20: "I Love You"; Miracle on Christmas
**Faith and Freedom Award for Movies** - Honoring movies that promote positive American values	**Faith and Freedom Award for Television and Streaming**
**Infidel**‡; Created Equal: Clarence Thomas in his Own Words; Greyhound; Mr. Jones; News of the World; The Social Dilemma; Waiting for Anya	**Blue Bloods: Episode 10.19: "Family Secrets"**‡; Babies: Part 2 AKA Season 2; Free Burma Rangers; The Good Doctor: Episode 3.20: "I Love You"; NCIS: Episode 17.20: "The Arizona"; Seal Team: Episode 3:15: "Rules of Engagement"; Self Made : Inspired by the Life of Madam C.J. Walker: Bootstraps
**Best Movie for Families**	**Best Movie for Mature Audiences**
**Safety**‡; The Croods: A New Age; I am Patrick: Patron Saint of Ireland; Jingle Jangle: A Christmas Journey; Onward; Red Shoes and the Seven Dwarfs; A Shaun the Sheep Movie: Farmageddon; The Social Dilemma; Sonic the Hedgehog; StarDog and TurboCat	**Greyhound**‡; Created Equal: Clarence Thomas in his Own Words; Honest Thief; I Still Believe; Infidel; Mr. Jones; News of the World; The Old Guard; Waiting for Anya; Wonder Woman 1984
**Grace Award for Most Inspiring Performance for Movies**	**Grace Award for Most Inspiring Performance for TV**
**Britt Robertson - I Still Believe**‡; Tom Hanks - Greyhound; John Rhys-Davies - I am Patrick: Patron Saint of Ireland; Jim Caviezel - Infidel	**Dolly Parton - Dolly Parton's Christmas on the Square**‡; Richard Roundtree - Family Reunion: P2E2: "Remember When Daddy Came Home?"; Tom Selleck - Blue Bloods: Episode 10.19: "Family Secrets"; Michael Weatherly - Bull: Episode 4:18: "Off the Rails"
