= Movieguide Award for Best Movie for Mature Audiences =

Annual American movie award

Every year, Movieguide gives an award to the Best Movie for Mature Audiences.

== Winners and nominees ==
Winners are listed first and highlighted in boldface.

Movie Year	Ceremony Year	Winner / Nominees	Source
1992	1993	**Sister Act**	
1993	1994	**The Remains of the Day**	
1994	1995	**Forrest Gump**	
1995	1996	**Braveheart**	
1996	1997	**Once Upon a Time...When We Were Colored**	
1997	1998	**Amistad**	
1998	1999	**Simon Birch**	
1999	2000	**The Straight Story**	
2000	2001	**The Patriot**	
2001	2002	**The Lord of the Rings: The Fellowship of the Ring**	
2002	2003	**We Were Soldiers**	
2003	2004	**The Lord of the Rings: Return of the King**	
2004	2005	**Spider-Man 2**	
2005	2006	**Pride and Prejudice**	
2006	2007	**The Queen**	
2007	2008	**Amazing Grace**	
2008	2009	**Iron Man**	
2009	2010	**The Blind Side**	
2010	2011	**Secretariat**	
2011	2012	**Pirates of the Caribbean: On Stranger Tides**	
2012	2013	**The Avengers** (tie) **The Dark Knight Rises** (tie)	
2013	2014	**Iron Man 3**	
2014	2015	**Unbroken**	
2015	2016	**The 33**; Ant-Man; Avengers: Age of Ultron; Captive; The Hunger Games: Mockingjay – Part 2; Joy; Jurassic World; The Martian; McFarland, USA; Mission: Impossible – Rogue Nation	
2016	2017	**God's Not Dead 2**; Ben-Hur; Captain America: Civil War; Eddie the Eagle; The Finest Hours; Hacksaw Ridge; Hail, Caesar!; Risen; Silence; Sully	
2017	2018	**Darkest Hour**; All Saints; Bitter Harvest; Dunkirk; Justice League; Pirates of the Caribbean: Dead Men Tell No Tales; The Promise; Thor: Ragnarok; Wonder; Wonder Woman	
2018	2019	**Chappaquiddick**; Ant-Man and the Wasp; Jurassic World: Fallen Kingdom; Little Pink House; Mission: Impossible – Fallout; A Quiet Place; Skyscraper; Solo: A Star Wars Story; Unbroken: Path to Redemption; Won't You Be My Neighbor?	
2019	2020	**A Beautiful Day in the Neighborhood**; 1917; Ad Astra; Avengers: Endgame; Ford V Ferrari; Harriet; A Hidden Life; Little Women; Spider-Man: Far from Home; Unplanned	
2020	2021	**Greyhound**; Created Equal: Clarence Thomas in his Own Words; Honest Thief; I Still Believe; Infidel; Mr. Jones; News of the World; The Old Guard; Waiting for Anya; Wonder Woman 1984	
2021	2022	**Dune**; Belfast; Black Widow; Cyrano; Infidel; King Richard; A Quiet Place Part II	
2022	2023	**Resistance: 1942**; Father Stu: Reborn; Jurassic World: Dominion; Mrs. Harris Goes to Paris; Top Gun: Maverick; Uncharted	
2023	2024	**Jesus Revolution**; Godzilla Minus One; The Boys in the Boat; Sound of Freedom; Guardians of the Galaxy Vol. 3	
2024	2025	**Young Woman and the Sea**; Dune: Part Two; Kingdom of the Planet of the Apes; Twisters; Unsung Hero	
2025	2026	**Sarah's Oil**; Bau: Artist at War; The Fantastic Four: First Steps; Mission: Impossible – The Final Reckoning; Superman	
