= Movieguide Faith and Freedom Award for Television and Streaming =

Annual American television award

Movieguide gives the Faith and Freedom Award for Television and Streaming to programs that promote positive American values.

== Winners and nominees ==
Winners are listed first and highlighted in boldface.

TV Year	Ceremony Year	Winner / Nominees	Source
2005	2006	**Extreme Makeover: Home Edition** (tie); **Sue Thomas F.B.Eye** (tie)	
2006	2007	**Hidden Places**	
2008	2009	**John Adams** (tie); **The Medal: Our Nation's Highest Honor** (tie)	
2009	2010	**Bedford: The Town They Left Behind**	
2010	2011	**Christmas with a Capital C**	
2011	2012	**The Lost Valentine**	
2012	2013	**A Smile as Big as the Moon**	
2013	2014	**Duck Dynasty: Episode 4.1: "Till Duck Do Us Part"**	
2014	2015	**The Gabby Douglas Story**	
2016	2017	**Operation Christmas**; Pocahontas: Dove of Peace; Karen Kingsbury's The Bridge Part 2; Dolly Parton's Christmas of Many Colors: Circle of Love; The Passion: New Orleans; Agents of S.H.I.E.L.D.: Episodes 3.20-22: "Emancipation", "Absolution", and "Ascension"	
2017	2018	**The Long Road Home: Episode 2: "Black Sunday, Part 2"**; Blue Bloods: Episode 8.1: "Cutting Losses"; The Crown: Episode 2.6: "Vergangenheit"; Five Came Back; The Middle: Episode 9.9: "The 200th"; Victoria: Episodes 1.5 and 1.6: "An Ordinary Woman" and "The Queen's Husband"	
2018	2019	**Medal of Honor: Episode 4: "Hiroshi Hershey Miyamura"**; Daredevil: Episode 3.13: "A New Napkin"; Little Women; Manifest: Pilot Episode; Marvel's Agents of S.H.I.E.L.D.: Episode 5.22: "The End"	
2019	2020	**Dolly Parton's Heartstrings: Episode 8: "These Old Bones"**; Country Music: Episode 8: "Don't Get Above Your Raisin'"; When Calls the Heart: "Home for Christmas"; The Crown: Episode 3.7: "Moondust"; Heartland: Episode 12.1: "Dare to Dream"	
2020	2021	**Blue Bloods: Episode 10.19: "Family Secrets"**; Babies: Part 2 AKA Season 2; Free Burma Rangers; The Good Doctor: Episode 3.20: "I Love You"; NCIS: Episode 17.20: "The Arizona"; Seal Team: Episode 3:15: "Rules of Engagement"; Self Made : Inspired by the Life of Madam C.J. Walker: Bootstraps	
2021	2022	**Superman and Lois: Episode 101: "Pilot"**; Atlantic Crossing: Episodes 1 and 2: "Angrepet" and "Tronefall"; Hawkeye: Episodes 1.1 and 1.2: "Never Meet Your Heroes" and "Hide and Seek"; The Mysterious Benedict Society: Episodes 1.1 and 1.2: "A Bunch Of Smart Orphans" and "Carrying A Bird"; The Pilgrims; Turner and Hooch: Episode 1.1: "Forever and a Dog"; The Waltons: Homecoming	
2022	2023	**A Waltons Thanksgiving**; Blood and Treasure: Season Two; Blue Bloods: Episode 12.20: "Silver Linings"; The Lord of the Rings: The Rings of Power: Episode 1.8: "Alloyed"; Rise; Star Wars: Andor: Episode 1.12: "Rix Road"	
2023	2024	**A Million Miles Away**; All the Light We Cannot See; The Mandalorian: "Chapter 18: The Mines of Mandalore"; Murf The Surf: Jewels, Jesus and Mayhem in the USA: Episodes 1.1-1.4: "The Heist," "Another Level of Madness," "God’s Business," and "The Truth Bends"; Tetris	
2024	2025	**NCIS: Episode 22:4: "Sticks & Stones"**; Blue Bloods: Episode 14:10: "The Heart of a Saturday Night"; County Rescue: Episode 1.5: "The Rescuer"; Masters of the Air: Episodes 1 and 2: "Part One" and "Part Two"; Quiet on Set: The Dark Side of Kids TV	
2025	2026	**House of David: Episode 208: "The Truth Revealed"**; Boston Blue: Episode 1.8: "In the Name of the Father, and of the Son…"; The Christmas Spark; County Rescue: Episode 2.5: "Hot Water"; When Hope Calls: Episodes 2.3 and 2.4: "A New Beginning" and "So Long, Not Goodbye"	
