= 2016 Movieguide Awards =

Annual American movie and television awards

The 2016 Movieguide Awards ceremony honored the best films and television of 2015.

== Winners and nominees ==
Winners are listed first, highlighted in boldface, and indicated with a double dagger (‡).

| **Epiphany Prize for Most Inspiring Movie** - Honoring movies that are wholesome, spiritually uplifting and inspirational | **Epiphany Prize for Most Inspiring TV Program** |
| **War Room**‡; The 33; Brooklyn; Captive; Do You Believe?; Manny; Woodlawn | **Dolly Parton's Coat of Many Colors**‡; A.D.: The Bible Continues; Ancient Roads from Christ to Constantine; Blue Bloods: Episode 6.9: "Hold Outs"; Chicago Fire: Episode 3.18: "Forgiving, Relentless, Unconditional"; Saints & Strangers |
| **Best Movie for Families** | **Best Movie for Mature Audiences** |
| **Home**‡; Cinderella; The Good Dinosaur; Inside Out; Max; Paddington; The Peanuts Movie; Shaun The Sheep Movie; The SpongeBob Movie: Sponge Out of Water; War Room | **The 33**‡; Ant-Man; Avengers: Age of Ultron; Captive; The Hunger Games: Mockingjay – Part 2; Joy; Jurassic World; The Martian; McFarland, USA; Mission: Impossible – Rogue Nation |
| **Grace Award for Most Inspiring Performance for Movies, Actor** | **Grace Award for Most Inspiring Performance for TV, Actor** |
| **Ted McGinley - Do You Believe?**‡; Antonio Banderas - The 33; Sean Astin - Woodlawn; Jon Voight - Woodlawn | **Juan Pablo Di Pace - A.D.: The Bible Continues**‡; Emmett J. Scanlan - A.D.: The Bible Continues; Joe Dixon - A.D.: The Bible Continues; Gordon Clapp - Chicago Fire: Episode 3.18: "Forgiving, Relentless, Unconditional"; Gerald McRaney - Dolly Parton's Coat of Many Colors; Vincent Kartheiser - Saints & Strangers |
| **Grace Award for Most Inspiring Performance for Movies, Actress** | **Grace Award for Most Inspiring Performance for TV, Actress** |
| **Karen Abercrombie - War Room**‡; Kate Mara - Captive; Juliet Stevenson - The Letters | **Alyvia Alyn Lind - Dolly Parton's Coat of Many Colors**‡; Jennifer Nettles - Dolly Parton's Coat of Many Colors |
| **Faith and Freedom Award for Movies** - Honoring movies that promote positive American values | |
| **Joy**‡; Cinderella; The Good Dinosaur; The Hunger Games: Mockingjay – Part 2; Max; McFarland, USA; Woman in Gold | |
