= Movieguide Faith and Freedom Award for Movies =

Annual American movie award

Movieguide gives the Faith and Freedom Award for Movies to movies that promote positive American values.

== Winners and nominees ==
Winners are listed first and highlighted in boldface.

Movie Year	Ceremony Year	Winner / Nominees	Source
1999	2000	**Naturally Native**	
2003	2004	**Gods and Generals**	
2005	2006	**A Distant Thunder**	
2006	2007	**The Pursuit of Happyness**	
2007	2008	**Bella**	
2008	2009	**Expelled: No Intelligence Allowed**	
2009	2010	**The Stoning of Soraya M.** (tie); **Invictus** (tie)	
2010	2011	**Mao's Last Dancer**	
2011	2012	**Captain America: The First Avenger**	
2012	2013	**For Greater Glory**	
2013	2014	**Iron Man 3**	
2014	2015	**The Giver**	
2015	2016	**Joy**; Cinderella; The Good Dinosaur; The Hunger Games: Mockingjay – Part 2; Max; McFarland, USA; Woman in Gold	
2016	2017	**Hacksaw Ridge**; Captain America: Civil War; God's Not Dead 2; Hail, Caesar!; Queen of Katwe; Sing; Sully	
2017	2018	**The Promise**; Bitter Harvest; The Boss Baby; Darkest Hour; Dunkirk; The Lego Batman Movie; Wonder	
2018	2019	**Little Pink House**; Ant-Man and the Wasp; Chappaquiddick; Paddington 2; Incredibles 2; Jurassic World: Fallen Kingdom	
2019	2020	**The Least of These: The Graham Staines Story**; 1917; Harriet; A Hidden Life; Unplanned	
2020	2021	**Infidel**; Created Equal: Clarence Thomas in his Own Words; Greyhound; Mr. Jones; News of the World; The Social Dilemma; Waiting for Anya	
2021	2022	**A Quiet Place Part II**; Black Widow; The Boss Baby: Family Business; The Courier; Dear Comrades!; Dune; God's Not Dead: We the People; Percy vs. Goliath	
2022	2023	**Running the Bases**; Devotion; Mrs. Harris Goes to Paris; Resistance: 1942; Top Gun: Maverick	
2023	2024	**Sound of Freedom**; Bank of Dave; Golda; Indiana Jones and the Dial of Destiny; Guy Ritchie's The Covenant	
2024	2025	**Reagan**; Bonhoeffer: Pastor. Spy. Assassin.; Cabrini; God's Not Dead: In God We Trust; Sound of Hope: The Story of Possum Trot	
2025	2026	**Bau: Artist at War**; The Fantastic Four: First Steps; Mission: Impossible – The Final Reckoning; Paddington in Peru; Sarah's Oil	
