= The Bible (miniseries) =

American TV series

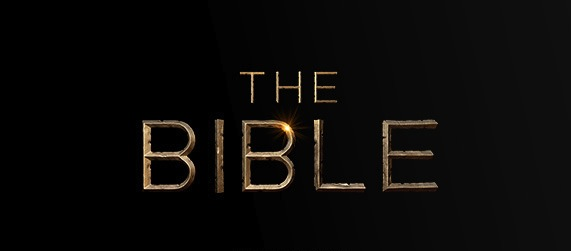
- Genre: Biblical epic Drama
- Created by: Roma Downey; Ryan Crego; Mark Burnett
- Based on: Catholic Bible
- Directed by: Roma Downey; Mark Burnett
- Starring: Diogo Morgado; Roma Downey; Darwin Shaw; Andrew Scarborough
- Narrated by: Keith David (US version); Robert Powell (UK version)
- Theme music composer: Hans Zimmer; Lorne Balfe; Lisa Gerrard
- Country of origin: United States
- Original languages: English; Hebrew
- No. of episodes: 10

Production
- Producers: Roma Downey; Mark Burnett; Richard Bedser; Dirk Hoogstra; Julian P. Hobbs
- Cinematography: Christopher Titus King; Rob Goldie; Peter Greenhalgh
- Editors: Robert Hall; Iain Kitching; Tom Parsons; Julian Rodd; Dominic Strevens
- Running time: 440 minutes
- Production company: Lightworkers Media
- Budget: Under $22 million

Original release
- Network: History
- Release: March 3 – March 31, 2013

Related
- Son of God; A.D. The Bible Continues

The Bible is a television miniseries based on the Bible. It was produced by Roma Downey, Richard Bedser and Mark Burnett and was broadcast weekly between March 3 and 31, 2013 on History channel.

Burnett, best known for producing prime-time hit reality shows, considers the scripted 10-hour series to be the "most important" project he has undertaken. The project was conceived by Burnett and Downey after watching Cecil B. DeMille's 1956 film The Ten Commandments for the first time since childhood.

The series is Mark Burnett's first scripted project. In addition to Burnett and Downey, executive producers include Richard Bedser and History's Dirk Hoogstra and Julian P. Hobbs. The first episode of the mini-series was seen by 13.1 million viewers, the largest cable television audience of 2013 to date. The second installment continued "to deliver blockbuster ratings" for the network, attracting 10.8 million viewers. The third installment on March 17, 2013, was once again the No. 1 show on all of Sunday night television with 10.9 million total viewers. In addition, the series garnered 4.2 million adults 25 to 54 and 3.5 million adults 18 to 49. In total, with subsequent airings, The Bible has received more than 100 million cumulative views.

The series received Emmy Award nominations for best miniseries, sound editing and sound mixing on July 18, 2013.

Parts of the telecast – including unaired footage – have been turned into a feature film about the life of Jesus entitled Son of God. A sequel series with the title A.D. The Bible Continues aired on NBC.

== Description ==
The series covers "Genesis to Revelation" in "one grand narrative," structured as 10 1-hour episodes originally broadcast in five pairs, with each episode containing two or three biblical stories told through live action and computer-generated imagery. According to Burnett, it included "obvious" stories such as Noah's Ark, the Exodus, and the life of Jesus Christ. Five hours are taken from the Old Testament, five from the New. The series is based on the New International Version and the New Revised Standard Version of the Bible.

Downey and Burnett said their "greatest hope" in making the series was that it would "affect a new generation of viewers and draw them back to the Bible."

"Part of what we hoped to accomplish with the series was to show the Bible is not simply a collection of unconnected stories which are often discussed and analyzed in snippets with chapter and verse numbers," the pair wrote in an op-ed in The Huffington Post. "Instead, we wanted to show how the Old Testament connects seamlessly to the New Testament. How they are one sweeping story with one grand, overriding message: God loves each one of us as if we were the only person in all the world to love."

== Cast ==
- Paul Knops as Adam
- Darcie Lincoln as Eve
- Mohamed Attougui as Cain
- David Rintoul as Noah
- Gary Oliver as Abraham
- Josephine Butler as Sarah
- Antonio Magro as Lot
- Rachel Edwards as Lot's wife
- Soraya Radford as Hagar
- Lonyo as the Guardian Angel
- Liang Yang as the Warrior Angel
- Hugo Rossi as Isaac
- Joe Forte as Young Moses
- Shivani Ghai as Batya
- Sean Teale as Young Ramesses
- Aharon Ipalé as the Pharaoh
- Will Houston as Moses
- Stewart Scudamore as Ramesses
- Sean Knopp as Young Joshua
- Louis Hilyer as Aaron
- Joanna Foster as Miriam
- Andrew Scarborough as Joshua
- Stephanie Leonidas as Rahab
- Terrence Maynard as the Commander of the Lord's Army
- Nonso Anozie as Samson
- Sharon Duncan-Brewster as Samson's Mother
- Julian Lewis Jones as the Angel of the Lord
- Kierston Wareing as Delilah
- Paul Freeman as Samuel
- Francis Magee as Saul
- Laurie Calvert as Young Jonathan
- Jassa Ahluwalia as Young David
- Conan Stevens as Goliath
- Langley Kirkwood as David
- Cristian Solimeno as Jonathan
- Hara Yannas as Michal
- Dhaffer L'Abidine as Uriah
- Melia Kreiling as Bathsheba
- Clive Wood as Nathan
- Peter Guinness as Nebuchadnezzar
- Raad Rawi as Jeremiah
- Samuel Collings as Zedekiah
- Jake Canuso as Daniel
- Christopher Simon as Azariah
- Gerald Kyd as Cyrus
- Sam Douglas as Herod
- Joe Coen as Joseph
- Leila Mimmack as Young Mary
- Eddie Elks as Angel Gabriel
- Patrice Naiambana as Balthazar
- Rick Bacon as Herod Antipas
- Greg Hicks as Pilate
- Daniel Percival as John the Baptist
- Diogo Morgado as Jesus
- Mohamen Mehdi Ouazanni as Satan
- Darwin Shaw as Peter
- Paul Marc Davis as Simon the Pharisee
- Sebastian Knapp as John
- Louise Delamere as Claudia
- Fraser Ayres as Barabbas
- Matthew Gravelle as Thomas
- Joe Wredden as Judas
- Amber Rose Revah as Mary Magdalene
- Simon Kunz as Nicodemus
- Adrian Schiller as Caiaphas
- Noureddine Aberdine as Joseph of Arimathea
- Roma Downey as Mary
- Paul Brightwell as Malchus
- Sana Mouziane as Martha
- Aniss Elkohen as Lazarus
- Michael Legge as Stephen
- Con O'Neill as Paul
- Nick Moss as Ananias
- Ben Aldridge as Luke
- Michael Nardonne as Cornelius

== Episodes ==
No.	Title	Directed by	Written by	Original release date	U.S. viewers (in millions)
1	"Beginnings"	Crispin Reece	Richard Bedser; Alexander Marengo; Colin Swash; Nic Young	March 3, 2013	13.10
While aboard the ark, Noah tells of the creation of the world, Adam and Eve, the fall of man and Cain murdering Abel (Genesis 1-4; 6-8); Abrahamic covenant; the Battle of the Vale of Siddim (Genesis 14); Hagar and Ishmael (Genesis 16); birth of Isaac (Genesis 21); Abraham is tested (Genesis 22); Sodom and Gomorrah (Genesis 19).
2	"Exodus"	Crispin Reece	Richard Bedser; Alexander Marengo	March 3, 2013	13.10
During the time of Egyptian slavery, Moses learns of his roots, kills a soldier and flees Egypt (Exodus 2); God speaks to Moses through the burning bush (Exodus 3); Moses returns to Egypt; ten Plagues of Egypt (Exodus 7-11); Moses leads the Israelites in The Exodus; Moses parts the Red Sea (Exodus 14); Moses receives the Ten Commandments at Mt. Sinai (Exodus 20).
3	"Homeland"	Tony Mitchell	Richard Bedser; Adam Rosenthal; Nic Young	March 10, 2013	10.80
Joshua becomes the leader of the Israelites (Deuteronomy 31; Joshua 1); the Israelites camp outside of Jericho; Joshua sends spies into Jericho (Joshua 2); Joshua invades and conquers Jericho (Joshua 6); Delilah betrays Samson, a hero of the Israelites who battled against the Philistines (Judges 13-16).
4	"Kingdom"	Tony Mitchell	Richard Bedser; Colin Swash; Nic Young	March 10, 2013	10.80
Samuel anoints Saul as king, a move that could throw the nation into civil war (1 Samuel 15); Saul is consumed with jealousy over the crown when David defeats Goliath (1 Samuel 17); King David ushers a golden age for Israel, but is soon seduced by power and lust for Bathsheba (2 Samuel 11); God forgives David, and Solomon builds God's temple in Jerusalem (1 Kings 6).
5	"Survival"	Crispin Reece	Richard Bedser; Nic Young	March 17, 2013	10.90
The Jews are enslaved in Babylon (Jeremiah 39); the image of gold and the three Hebrews in the blazing furnace (Daniel 3); Daniel is thrown into the lions’ den, but then his faith endures and God spares him (Daniel 6); Cyrus the Great allows the Jews to return to Jerusalem (2 Chronicles 36; Ezra 1).
6	"Hope"	Crispin Reece	Richard Bedser; Nic Young	March 17, 2013	10.90
During the time of Roman occupation, the Angel Gabriel tells Mary that she will bear a child (Luke 1); Joseph takes Mary to Bethlehem for the census, where Jesus is born (Luke 2); the Holy family escapes Herod’s order to kill Bethlehem’s male babies (Matthew 2); Judea comes under the ruthless rule of Pilate; John baptizes Jesus (Matthew 3); Satan tempts Jesus in the wilderness (Matthew 4); Jesus performs the miraculous catch of fish and calls Peter (Matthew 4).
7	"Mission"	Christopher Spencer	Richard Bedser; Christopher Spencer; Nic Young	March 24, 2013	10.30
Jesus heals a paralytic and forgives the paralytic's sins, Jesus calls a tax collector, Matthew as a disciple, Jesus feeds crowds of thousands in Galilee (Matthew 14), walks on water and brings a dead man, Lazarus, back to life (John 11); Jesus enters Jerusalem riding on a donkey – a declaration that he is the Messiah; Jesus turns on the money-changers in the Temple (Mark 11).
8	"Betrayal"	Christopher Spencer	Richard Bedser; Christopher Spencer; Colin Swash; Nic Young	March 24, 2013	10.30
Caiphas coaxes Judas into betraying Jesus; Jesus throws the disciples into turmoil at the Last Supper; Jesus prays in the Garden of Gethsemane (Mark 14); Jesus is arrested and Malchus' ear is cut off by Peter and Jesus heals his ear; Jesus is confronted by the high priests at his Sanhedrin trial (Matthew 26).
9	"Passion"	Christopher Spencer	Richard Bedser; Christopher Spencer; Abraham Christen Liando; Colin Swash; Nic Young	March 31, 2013	11.70
Peter denies Jesus (Luke 22) and Judas hangs himself; Pilate's wife has a dream and warns Pilate not to crucify Jesus (Matthew 27); Pilate has Jesus whipped 40 times and the crown of thorns are placed on Jesus' head (John 19); Jesus is condemned to death (Matthew 27); Jesus is crucified; Jesus is buried (John 19).
10	"Courage"	Tony Mitchell	Richard Bedser; Christopher Spencer; Nic Young	March 31, 2013	11.70
Mary Magdalene goes to his tomb, a figure walks towards her – He is back (John 20); Jesus commissions the disciples to "go and preach to all" before he ascends (Acts 1). The Holy Spirit comes at Pentecost (Acts 2); Stephen is stoned by the Pharisee Paul (Acts 7); Paul has a vision and experiences a miraculous change of faith on a journey to Damascus (Acts 9); martyrdom of the Disciples, John's survival and exile to Patmos, John receives a revelation – Jesus is coming back, and all who keep the faith will be rewarded.

== Development ==
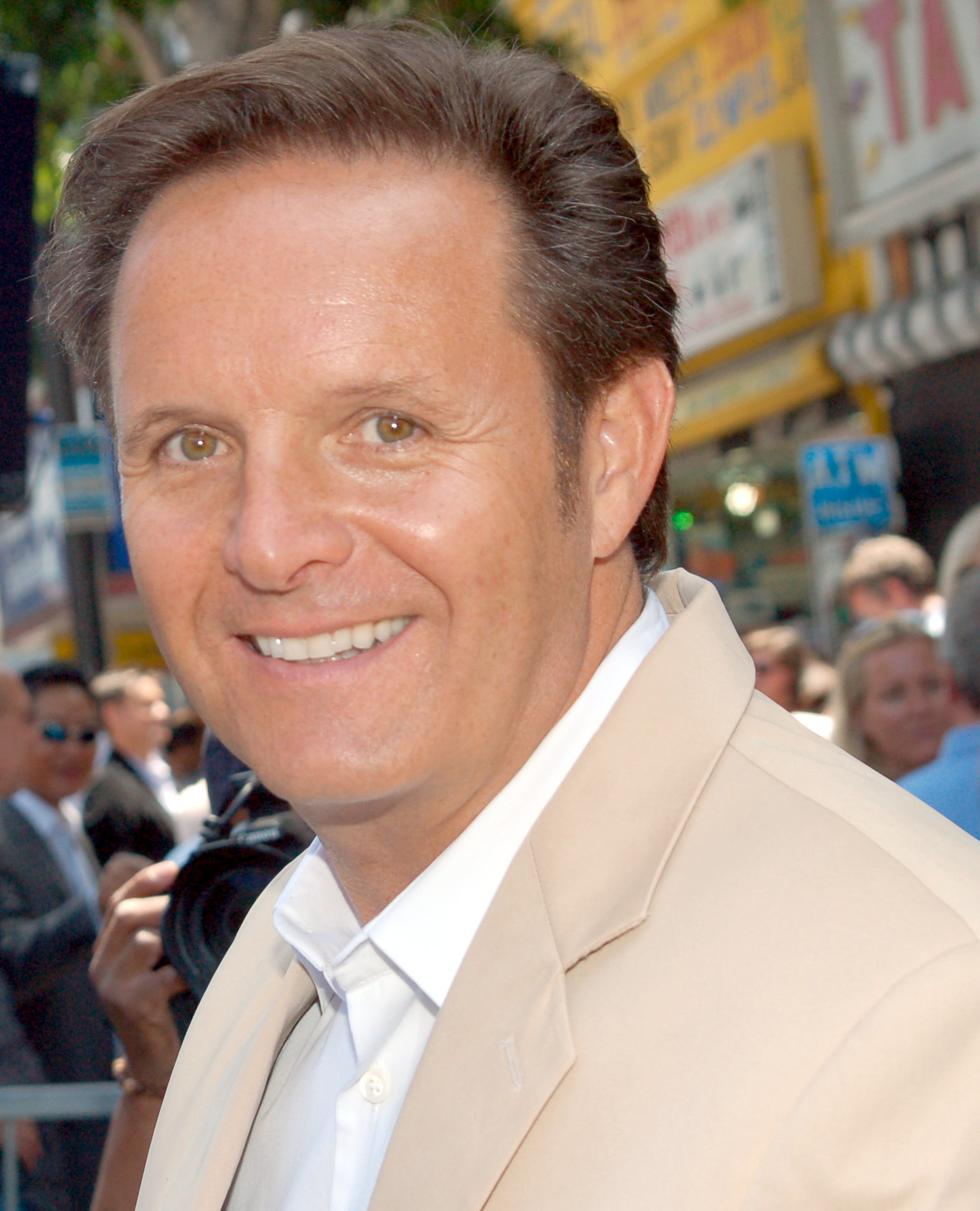
Mark Burnett in 2009

In May 2011, The New York Times reported that Downey, Burnett and their production team were selecting stories for the series, with production scheduled to begin in 2012 for a 2013 broadcast. The budget for the series was under $22 million. Researchers and theologians were asked to verify accuracy. Academic consultants included Craig A. Evans, Helen Bond, Paula Gooder, Mark Goodacre and Candida Moss. Shooting took place in Morocco and elsewhere.

Burnett and Downey consulted "a wide range of pastors and academics," including their friend Joel Osteen, Joshua Garroway (a rabbi from Hebrew Union College), and a Catholic cardinal. Geoff Tunnicliffe of the World Evangelical Alliance, read each episode's script and visited the set in Morocco: he "wanted to be sure that the final edits would hold together as a singular thematic message throughout the entire series" and "was not disappointed." Another consultant, Focus on the Family President Jim Daly, applauded the couple's courage for making the series: "Let's face it, it takes some moxie to lift up the Bible in the middle of Hollywood. In fact, when they first proposed the project they were told to try and tell the story without mentioning Jesus. They refused."

Other project advisors included:

- Rick Warren (pastor, Saddleback Church)
- Erwin McManus (pastor, Mosaic)
- Sam Rodriguez (National Hispanic Christian Leadership Conference)
- Paul Eshleman (Campus Crusade for Christ)
- Bobby Gruenewald (YouVersion Bible)
- Brad Lomenick (Catalyst)
- Leith Anderson (president, National Association of Evangelicals)
- Frank Wright (president, National Religious Broadcasters)
- Tom Peterson (Catholics Come Home)
- Gabe Lyons (founder of the Fermi Project)
- Luis Palau (Christian evangelist)
- George Wood (General Superintendent of the General Council of the Assemblies of God in the United States of America)
- Craig Groeschel (Life Church)
- Denny Rydberg (Young Life)
- Andrew Benton (president, Pepperdine University)

Days before the series premiere, Downey and Burnett authored an op-ed for The Wall Street Journal arguing that Bible teaching should be mandatory in U.S. public schools because "(t)he foundations of knowledge of the ancient world – which informs the understanding of the modern world – are biblical in origin."

== Reception ==
=== TV ratings ===
The opening episode of the series premiered to very high ratings. The miniseries was watched by 13.1 million total viewers, according to Nielsen. In Canada, the premiere was watched by 1.05 million viewers. The second installment saw a ratings slippage, but still brought in 10.8 million viewers, tops in all television for the 8–10 p.m. time period. Week three's installment, meanwhile, garnered 10.9 million total viewers.

=== Critical reception ===
The review aggregator website Rotten Tomatoes reported that 14% of critics have given the series a positive review based on 14 reviews, with an average rating of 4.63/10. The site's critics consensus reads, "An earnest but shallow take on the Greatest Story Ever Told, The Bible suffers from leaden pacing and mediocre special effects." At Metacritic, it has a weighted average score of 45 out of 100 based on 13 critics, indicating "mixed or average reviews".

Allan Yuhas of The Guardian compared the series to reality TV, as well as criticizing the lack of ethnic minorities in major roles.

=== Distribution ===
On March 19, 2013, Roma Downey and Mark Burnett offered remarks on the viewership and its anticipated diffusion. He said: "We've realized, on the journey around the country to churches and all over the place, many people cannot afford cable TV. And those people need to see this Bible series. So we're rushing the DVD out April 2nd, also immediately with Spanish subtitles. This is very important. And this is only for America and Canada. Now we're about to start around the world. This will be in every country of the world. More people will see this series than everything we ever made together, combined. Billions of people will see this series. Billions."

== Differences from the Bible ==
In the introduction to each episode, the message is displayed "This program is an adaptation of Bible stories that changed our world. It endeavors to stay true to the spirit of the Book." Roma Downey stated in an interview, "we had a great team of scholars and theologians helping us, making sure that we told these stories accurately and truthfully". A few of the cases of artistic license that have raised comment include:

- In the Bible, Noah's three sons are fully grown men, whereas in the TV series they are depicted as boys.
- Abraham is depicted as begging his nephew Lot not to part ways with him, whereas in Genesis they part amicably and Abraham encourages Lot's decision.
- In the Book of Genesis, the angelic visitors were approached by Lot, who insisted they stay with him. Then they feasted with Lot in his home. The series shows the angels approaching Lot and begging for help with no hospitality extended to them. (Genesis 19:1-5)
- The text describes a mob gathered outside of Lot's home wanting to rape his two angelic visitors, and Lot offering his daughters instead. The series omits this. (Genesis 19:4-10)
- The series shows Sarah running after Abraham once she realizes he is going to sacrifice Isaac. This is not in the text. (Genesis 22:1-19)
- In the Binding of Isaac, the text describes an adult ram caught by its horns in a thicket. The miniseries depicts a juvenile lamb caught by its leg. (Genesis 22:13)
- Moses's sister Miriam is depicted as a slave and as younger than him, while in the biblical story she is significantly older and has been watching out for him since he was a baby.
- The Bible text says that Samson tied torches on 300 foxes' tails, causing them to burn the Philistines' crops and plants. This was because Samson was angry with his father-in-law for giving his wife to another man. When they heard this they burned Samson's wife and her father to death (Judges 15: 4–6). In the series the Philistine commander has Samson's wife and her father put to death as a consequence for marrying Samson because he was an Israelite.
- The incident in which Saul makes an unlawful sacrifice to God before the prophet Samuel arrives takes place before the famous Battle of Michmash. In the Bible, it was when he spared King Agag of the Amalekites that Saul was denounced as king by Samuel and the Lord, several years after King Saul's unlawful sacrifice.
- When the Babylonians destroy Jerusalem, Jeremiah is depicted as escaping unnoticed by the invaders. In the text Jeremiah is captured, bound in chains and later released. (Jeremiah 39:11-40:6)
- The show depicts Daniel and his three compatriots being captured during the siege, when in the Bible they were deported more than a decade before Jerusalem's destruction. (Daniel 1; 2 Kings 24:10-16)
- The miniseries depicts the prophet Isaiah as a contemporary of Daniel, living during the time of the Babylonian exile. This is a major inconsistency with the text as Isaiah prophesied that Cyrus the Persian would release the captives after a period of time. This prophecy occurred 150 years before Cyrus was born, 180 years before Cyrus performed any of these feats, and 80 years before the Jews were taken into exile. Thus, Isaiah could never have existed contemporaneously with Daniel and Cyrus. (Isaiah 44:28; 45:1; 45:13).
- In the miniseries' depiction of the Temptation of Christ, the Devil takes Jesus to a high mountain where he tempts Jesus to throw himself down. In the text, the Devil tempted Jesus to throw himself down from the pinnacle of the temple. The high mountain was where the devil tempted Jesus to worship him. (Matthew 4:1-11; Luke 4:1-13)
- In the Bible, Jesus has the mourners remove the stone, and then he called for Lazarus to come out. In the miniseries, Jesus enters Lazarus' tomb and kisses him on the head, while not even addressing Lazarus, and gives a brand-new monologue. (John 11:38-44)

=== Lookalike controversy ===
There have been claims of a resemblance of the actor in the role of Satan (Mohamen Mehdi Ouazanni) to then-U.S. President Barack Obama. The resemblance was first pointed out notably by Glenn Beck ahead of the episode's premiere. This led the History Channel to announce:

History [C]hannel has the highest respect for President Obama. The Bible series was produced with an international and diverse cast of respected actors. It's unfortunate that anyone made this false connection. History’s "The Bible" is meant to enlighten people on its rich stories and deep history."

Burnett and Downey responded in a joint statement that "This is utter nonsense" and that the actor, Mehdi Ouazanni, had previously played Satanic characters long before Barack Obama was elected as president. Downey added separately:

"Both Mark and I have nothing but respect and love for our president, who is a fellow Christian. False statements such as these are just designed as a foolish distraction to try and discredit the beauty of the story of The Bible."

In the film Son of God, all scenes with Satan were deleted. Speaking to the Hollywood Reporter, Roma Downey said,

"It gives me great pleasure to tell you that the devil is on the cutting-room floor. This is now a movie about Jesus, the son of God, and the devil gets no more screen time."

=== Awards and nominations ===
The Bible was nominated for three Primetime Emmy Awards: Outstanding Miniseries or Movie, Outstanding Sound Editing for a Miniseries, Movie or a Special, and Outstanding Sound Mixing for a Miniseries or a Movie. The 44th GMA Dove Awards gave a tribute to the miniseries in October, 2013. In 2014, The Bible won the honor of Home Media Magazine's Best Miniseries or TV Movie on Disc that year. It also was awarded the Epiphany Prize for Inspiring Television and the Grace Award (presented to Roma Downey) by MovieGuide at the 2014 MovieGuide Awards.

== Other media ==
=== International broadcasts ===
- United States – History: March 3, 2013 – March 31, 2013
- Canada – History: March 3, 2013 – March 31, 2013
- Spain – Antena 3: March 25, 2013 – April 2013
- Finland – Alfa TV: Premiered December 1, 2013
- Colombia – Caracol TV: March 28, 2013 – April 2013
- Chile – Canal 13: March 29, 2013 – April 2013 / March 30, 2018
- Portugal – SIC: March 30–31, 2013
- Greece – ANT1: April 29, 2013 – May 4, 2013
- Cyprus – ANT1: April 29, 2013 – May 4, 2013
- United Kingdom – Channel 5: November 30, 2013 – December 22, 2013
- Australia – Nine Network: Premiered July 16, 2013
- Brazil – Rede Record: Premiered October 16, 2013
- Poland – Polsat: Premiered October 19, 2013
- Hong Kong – TVB Pearl: Premiered November 6, 2013
- Kenya – KTN: Premiered October 7, 2013
- France – Paris Première: Premiered December 8, 2013
- Ireland – TV3 (Ireland): December 21, 2013
- Slovakia – Slovenská televízia: Premiered December 23, 2013
- Russia – TV-3: Premiered January 2014
- Italy – Rete 4: Premiered March 23, 2014
- Mexico – Canal 5: April 14, 2014 – April 19, 2014 / March 26, 2018 – March 30, 2018 / April 15, 2019 – April 19, 2019 (Holy Week special)
- Costa Rica – Teletica Canal 7: April 17–18, 2014
- Philippines – ABS-CBN: April 17–19, 2014 / April 13–15, 2017 / March 29–31, 2018 / April 18–19, 2019 / April 9–11, 2020; Cinema One: April 19–20, 2019 / April 9–11, 2020; Kapamilya Channel and A2Z: April 1–3, 2021 / April 14–16, 2022; GMA: April 6–8, 2023 (Holy Week special) / October 27, 2024 – April 27, 2025 (weekly program)
- Peru – América Televisión: April 6, 2014 – April –, 2014
- Netherlands – EO: Premiered May 12, 2014
- Germany – VOX: April 17, 2014 – April 19, 2014
- Ecuador – Ecuavisa, Ecuavisa HD: April 5, 2014 – April 19, 2014
- Lebanon – LBCI: April 10, 2014 – April 20, 2014.
- United States – Telemundo: March 25, 2015
- Australia – Australian Christian Channel

=== DVD release ===
The series became the biggest-selling miniseries on DVD in its first week of release, and biggest on Blu-ray and Digital HD of all time. In its first week on home video, The Bible series sold 525,000 copies. It was the fastest selling television show on DVD since 2008. A Blu-ray version is also available via 20th Century Fox.

=== Novel ===
Roma Downey and Mark Burnett have also released a novelization of this miniseries, entitled A Story of God and All of Us: A Novel Based on the Epic TV Miniseries "The Bible." It debuted at No. 27 on the New York Times Best-Seller List.

=== Soundtrack ===
The Bible: Music Inspired by the Epic Miniseries

Soundtrack album

A CD was released on March 12, 2013, with Christian music singers performing songs inspired by the miniseries:

The Bible (Music Inspired by the Epic Miniseries)
No.	Title	Writer(s)	Artist(s)	Length
1.	"In Your Eyes"	Peter Gabriel	Francesca Battistelli	5:08
2.	"Live Like That"	David Frey; Ben Glover; Ben McDonald	Sidewalk Prophets	3:57
3.	"This Side of Heaven"	Chris August	Chris August	2:57
4.	"Starting Line"	Jason Castro; Phillip LaRue; Seth Mosley	Jason Castro	3:32
5.	"Love Come to Life"	Jeremy Redmon	Big Daddy Weave	3:46
6.	"Crave"	Shaun Shankel; Joel Smallbone; Luke Smallbone	for King & Country	4:26
7.	"Fearless"	Andy Anderson; Tony Battaglia; Blanca Callahan; Manwell Reyes	Group 1 Crew	3:22
8.	"What Love Means"	Seth Mosley; Nikita Odnoralov; Ruslan Odnoralov	Everfound	3:36
9.	"Home"	Paul Alan; Dara Maclean	Dara Maclean	3:53
10.	"Wash Me Away"	Ian Eskelin; Nicole Witt; Tony Wood	Point of Grace	3:03
11.	"Not for a Moment (After All)"	Meredith Andrews; Stu G Jason Ingram; James MacDonald; Andi Rozier	Meredith Andrews	4:00
12.	"Mary, Did You Know?"	Buddy Greene; Mark Lowry	Kenny Rogers; Wynonna	3:51

=== Score ===
The Bible (Official Score Soundtrack)
No.	Title	Artist(s)	Length
1.	"Faith" (featuring Lisa Gerrard)	Hans Zimmer; Lorne Balfe	12:49
2.	"In the Beginning"	Hans Zimmer; Lorne Balfe	3:47
3.	"Romas Lament" (featuring Lisa Gerrard)	Hans Zimmer; Lorne Balfe	5:30
4.	"Hope" (featuring Lisa Gerrard)	Hans Zimmer; Lorne Balfe	2:22
5.	"Journey"	Hans Zimmer; Lorne Balfe	3:18
6.	"Zedekiah's Sons"	Hans Zimmer; Lorne Balfe	1:55
7.	"Daniel Prays"	Hans Zimmer; Lorne Balfe	2:12
8.	"The Road to Jerusalem"	Hans Zimmer; Lorne Balfe	2:05
9.	"Pentecost"	Hans Zimmer; Lorne Balfe	2:15
10.	"King David"	Hans Zimmer; Lorne Balfe	1:41
11.	"I Am" (featuring Lisa Gerrard)	Hans Zimmer; Lorne Balfe	3:45
12.	"Pray for Us"	Hans Zimmer; Lorne Balfe	1:51
13.	"Free Us, Save Us"	Hans Zimmer; Lorne Balfe	2:28
14.	"The Nativity" (featuring Lisa Gerrard)	Hans Zimmer; Lorne Balfe	4:33
15.	"Creation Choral"	Hans Zimmer; Lorne Balfe	2:08
16.	"Rise up in Faith" (featuring Lisa Gerrard)	Hans Zimmer; Lorne Balfe	2:45

=== Theatrical release ===
Mark Burnett announced in April 2013 that a version of the miniseries was being prepared for global theatrical release. In June 2013, Burnett stated that the film would focus exclusively on the life of Jesus. In September 2013, it was announced that 20th Century Fox would partner with Burnett on theatrical distribution on the film, which was titled Son of God. Son of God was released on February 28, 2014.

== Sequel – A.D. ==
On December 17, 2013, it was announced that there would be a follow-up miniseries in 2015, titled A.D. The Bible Continues, also produced by Burnett, Downey, and Bedser. The limited series began airing on NBC on Easter Sunday, April 5. It airs in twelve weekly one-hour episodes. The story takes place immediately after the events of The Bible, beginning with the Crucifixion and Resurrection, and continues with the first ten chapters of the Book of Acts. On July 3, 2015, NBC canceled A.D. The Bible Continues after one season. However, producers Burnett and Downey plan future biblical productions on their OTT digital channel.

== See also ==
- Depiction of Jesus
- The Bible in film
