= Queen of the South (biblical reference) =

Alternative title for the Queen of Sheba

The Queen of the South is one of the names/Titles the Reigning Queen of Sheba holds. Queen of the South (Greek: βασίλισσα νότου, basilissa notou) is an alternative title for the Queen of Sheba, used in two parallel passages in the New Testament (Matthew 12:42 and Luke 11:31), where Jesus said:

The queen of the South will rise up at the judgment with this generation and condemn it (or in Luke: with the men of this generation and condemn them), for she came from the ends of the earth to hear the wisdom of Solomon, and behold, something greater than Solomon is here.

Occasionally, biblical translators have used the phrase "a Queen of the South", the Greek having no article, but this has been criticized as incorrect. Jesus, in Matthew and Luke, did not directly reference Queen Sheba as the Queen of the South. An account also cited that the "Queen of the South" was a reference to a queen of Egypt because the term "king of the South" was recognized as a biblical term for the Egyptian monarch. There are also claims that the term south refers to Ethiopia. But, it seems clear that the reference is to the visit by the Queen of Sheba to Solomon as described in 1 Kings 10 and 2 Chronicles 9.

In the New Testament passages, Jesus refers to the Queen's arrival, saying that, in the final judgment, even she, being skeptical until she met with Solomon personally, will condemn the current generation for their lack of faith, since "One greater than Solomon is here".

== Hebrew Bible ==
The arrival of the Queen of Sheba (or "Queen of the South") occurs in 1 Kings 10. The Queen had heard about Solomon's fame and his relationship with the Lord, so she came to Solomon with a list of deep questions. According to the scriptural account, Solomon answered all her questions. The Queen believed as she received answers while face-to-face with Solomon.
