= A.D. The Bible Continues =

2015 American television series

- Genre: Biblical drama
- Created by: Roma Downey; Mark Burnett
- Based on: The New Testament
- Directed by: Ciaran Donnelly; Tony Mitchell; Brian Kelly; Rob Evans; Paul Wilmshurst
- Starring: Juan Pablo Di Pace; Adam Levy; Chipo Chung; Babou Ceesay; Emmett J. Scanlan; Will Thorp
- Theme music composer: Lorne Balfe
- Country of origin: United States
- Original language: English
- No. of episodes: 12

Production
- Producers: Roma Downey; Mark Burnett; Richard Bedser
- Cinematography: Tim Fleming; Toby Moore
- Editors: Robert Hall; David Fisher; John Richards; Nick Arthurs; Iain Erskine; Tim Murrell; Oral Norrie Ottey; Steve Singleton; Jamie Trevill
- Running time: 46 minutes 30 minutes (Philippines)
- Production companies: Lightworkers Media; United Artists Media Group

Original release
- Network: NBC
- Release: April 5 – June 21, 2015

Related
- The Bible

A.D. The Bible Continues (also known as A.D. Kingdom and Empire) is an American biblical drama television series, based on the Bible, and a sequel to the 2013 miniseries, The Bible, and follows up from the film Son of God which was a more in depth look on Jesus's story. It was produced by Roma Downey, Mark Burnett, and Richard Bedser. The limited series began airing on NBC on Easter Sunday, April 5, 2015, in twelve weekly one-hour episodes. The story takes place immediately after the events of The Bible miniseries, and then of the Son of God film, beginning with the crucifixion and resurrection of Jesus, and continues with the first ten chapters of the Acts of the Apostles. On July 3, 2015, NBC cancelled A.D. The Bible Continues after one season.

== Cast ==
=== Main ===
- Adam Levy as Peter
- Babou Ceesay as John
- Alastair Mackenzie as James, brother of Jesus
- Denver Isaac as James the Great
- Emmett J. Scanlan as Saul of Tarsus
- Fraser Ayres as Simon the Zealot
- Chipo Chung as Mary Magdalene
- Jóhannes Haukur Jóhannesson as Thomas
- Pedro Lloyd Gardiner as Matthew
- Kenneth Collard as Barnabas
- Joe Dixon as Philip the Evangelist
- Reece Ritchie as Stephen
- Richard Coyle as Caiaphas
- Vincent Regan as Pontius Pilate
- Joanne Whalley as Claudia, wife of Pontius Pilate

=== Supporting ===
- Juan Pablo Di Pace as Jesus
- Greta Scacchi as Mary
- Kevin Doyle as Joseph of Arimathea
- Helen Daniels as Maya, daughter of Peter
- Struan Rodger as Gamaliel
- Nicholas Sidi as Ananias of Damascus
- Marama Corlett as Tabitha
- Farzana Dua Elahe as Joanna
- Jim Sturgeon as Chuza
- Colin Salmon as the Ethiopian eunuch
- Will Thorp as Cornelius the Centurion
- James Callis as Herod Antipas
- Claire Cooper as Herodias
- Jodhi May as Leah, wife of Caiaphas
- Ken Bones as Annas
- Lex Shrapnel as Jonathan, son of Annas
- Andrew Gower as Caligula
- Kenneth Cranham as Tiberius
- Michael Peluso as Herod Agrippa
- Stephen Walters as Simon the Sorcerer
- Peter De Jersey as Ananias, husband of Sapphira
- Indra Ové as Sapphira
- Chris Brazier as Reuben
- George Georgiou as Boaz
- Charlene McKenna as Eva
- Francis Magee as Levi, the leader of the Zealots
- John Benfield as Yitzhak, student of Simon the Sorcerer
- John Ioannou as Melek, a healed cripple
- Cesare Taurasi as Judas Iscariot

== Development ==
On December 17, 2013, it was announced that there would be a follow-up series to The Bible in 2015.

In anticipation of the global event, a number of companion materials were released in an effort by Palam Fidelis Publishing to engage thoughtful, religious discussion by offering "Family Discussion Guides" for each episode.

== Episodes ==
No.	Title	Directed by	Written by	Original release date	U.S. viewers (millions)
1	"The Tomb Is Open"	Ciaran Donnelly	Simon Block	April 5, 2015	9.68
Pontius Pilate orders the crucifixion of Jesus in order to maintain the peace and satisfy his people. Overcome with guilt for betraying Jesus, Judas hangs himself in the wastelands. Three days later, Caiaphas receives news that the tomb has been broken opened and Jesus is gone.
2	"The Body Is Gone"	Ciaran Donnelly	Simon Block	April 12, 2015	7.75
Caiaphas deals with the disappearance of Jesus' body as the disciples scatter into the city. At the Sea of Galilee, a resurrected Jesus appears to his shocked followers. He suggests that they return to Jerusalem and spread the word. Jesus then climbs a hill and disappears in a bright light.
3	"The Spirit Arrives"	Ciaran Donnelly	Andy Rattenbury	April 19, 2015	6.36
Caiaphas must answer to King Herod Antipas for the political unrest gripping the city. The disciples begin their work spreading the message of Jesus' teachings.
4	"The Wrath"	Tony Mitchell	Ben Newman	April 26, 2015	5.77
Pilate attempts to bring Jerusalem under control. Cornelius and his men search the city for Boaz the assassin. Caiaphas puts Peter and John on public trial. John has a dream that leads him to the Temple, where he recruits Barnabas to the cause.
5	"The First Martyr"	Tony Mitchell	Ben Newman	May 3, 2015	5.47
Peter and the apostles find their former safe house filled with scared converts and refugees. Pilate continues his reign of terror against the Jews. Boaz turns himself in to Caiaphas and Reuben. Stephen publicly condemns Caiaphas for refusing the Word of God, and he is stoned to death while a young man named Saul of Tarsus watches.
6	"The Persecution"	Tony Mitchell	Damian Wayling	May 10, 2015	4.53
As the disciples mourn Stephen's death, Saul of Tarsus condemns Jesus as a false prophet. The Sanhedrin seek Caiaphas's successor. Caiaphas is not happy to play host to Leah's family and less happy to discover that Herod and Herodias have invited themselves to stay for Purim.
7	"The Visit"	Brian Kelly	Andy Rattenbury	May 17, 2015	4.80
Saul and his men search Jerusalem for Peter and the disciples. Simon the Sorcerer fails to heal an unconscious woman in the market. By using Jesus' name, Philip succeeds where Simon failed, prompting Simon to ask to be baptized. Roman Emperor Tiberius and his nephew Caligula enter Jerusalem.
8	"The Road to Damascus"	Brian Kelly	Damian Wayling	May 24, 2015	4.24
Caiaphas asks Reuben to escort Saul to Damascus. On the way, Jesus appears to Saul in a ball of light. He instructs Saul to go to Damascus and await further instruction. John and Peter go to Samaria to assist Philip. Simon the Sorcerer offers to donate all of his money to help spread Jesus' word, in exchange for "a few drops of the Holy Spirit". Tiberius dies in his sleep. Caligula tears up Pilate's commission and proclaims himself emperor.
9	"Saul's Return"	Rob Evans	Tom Grieves	May 31, 2015	4.74
Saul's preaching at the Damascus synagogue sparks a riot. Caligula orders Pilate to erect a statue of him in the temple as the new "king" of the Jews. While searching for Simon the Zealot, Saul is captured by Reuben and his men and sent to prison.
10	"Brothers In Arms"	Rob Evans	Rachel Anthony	June 7, 2015	4.09
After visiting Saul in prison, Caiaphas decides to release him. James the Just, Jesus' childhood friend, visits the disciples and talks to Caiaphas about ending the persecution brought on the followers of Jesus. Controversy erupts with the disciples and Saul over the function of the Temple. A wealthy Ethiopian treasurer visits Jerusalem and Pilate invites him to dine in the Roman palace. Tabitha converts to Christianity, but Claudia and Herodias find her and have her scourged on Pilate's orders.
11	"Rise Up"	Paul Wilmshurst	Ben Newman	June 14, 2015	3.99
Pilate kills Joanna and exiles the Ethiopian treasurer for collaboration with the Zealots. The disciples send Saul back to Tarsus to preach. Peter heals Aeneas and resurrects Tabitha, winning new converts to the faith. The Jewish people and the Zealots rally for war. Philip meets the Ethiopian treasurer reading the prophet Isaiah's writings, given to him by Caiaphas. The Ethiopian believes and is baptized. Emperor Caligula's statue enters Jerusalem with the promise of total war and destruction.
12	"The Abomination"	Paul Wilmshurst	Tom Grieves	June 21, 2015	3.56
Pilate meets with Caiaphas and his wife Leah to tell them that the golden statue of Emperor Caligula must enter the Temple whether they like it or not. Peter converts Cornelius to Christianity. Caiaphas calls a meeting with James the Just to tell him that, if the disciples join him, they can repel the statue of Caligula. James the Just denies the offer. The resistance of the Zealots is crushed, but the gold statue of the Emperor gets damaged in the process. Pilate refuses to concede defeat. Peter is taken away by Roman soldiers. The age of the disciples' martyrdom has now begun.

== Reception ==
The show premiered on Easter Sunday 2015 on NBC to 9.7 million viewers. It averaged 6.5 million viewers across 12 episodes on NBC. Although the series had a strong viewership for the Easter Sunday premiere, ratings dropped steadily over the 12-week broadcast. NBC would cancel the series after one season. Producers Burnett and Downey said that they planned future biblical productions on an OTT digital channel in 2015, but as of 2026 a follow-up has not been released.

A.D.: The Bible Continues has received mixed reviews from critics. On the aggregate website Metacritic, the series has a weighted average score of 55 out of 100 based on 11 critics, indicating "mixed or average reviews". On Rotten Tomatoes reported that 58 percent of critics have given the film a positive review based on 12 reviews, with an average rating of 4.78/10. The site's critics consensus reads, "Attempts to offer a fresh look at a traditional tale notwithstanding, A.D.: The Bible Continues doesn't do enough to set itself apart from its many predecessors."

In Australia, the series premiered on July 5, 2015, on the Nine Network, as A.D. Kingdom and Empire. It premiered to 472,000 viewers, losing 828,000 viewers from its 60 Minutes lead-in.

== Awards and nominations ==
Jesus actor Juan Pablo Di Pace was awarded the Grace Award at the 2016 Movieguide Awards.

== International Broadcasting ==
In the Philippines, the series first aired on ABS-CBN on Holy Saturday, April 20, 2019, as part of Holy Week special programming.

The series re-aired on June 2, 2025 on GMA Network's Prime line up. The series was extended for 6 days on June 14, 2025 on the network's Sabado Star Power sa Gabi line up. The series concluded on GMA Network on July 12, 2025. The series as also is set to premiere on from October 12 2025 to February 1 2026 .

== Home Video /Streaming ==
On November 3, 2015, A.D.: The Bible Continues was released on Home Video on DVD, and Blu-ray. It was also available for digital release.

As of 2026, AD The Bible Continues is available for purchase or streaming on various platforms including Apple TV and Tubi.
