= List of The Chosen episodes =

The Chosen is an American historical drama television series created, directed and co-written by American filmmaker Dallas Jenkins. It is the first multiseason series about the life and ministry of Jesus of Nazareth. Primarily set in Judaea and Galilee in the 1st century, the series centers on Jesus and the different people who met and followed or otherwise interacted with him. The series stars Jonathan Roumie as Jesus, alongside Shahar Isaac, Elizabeth Tabish, Paras Patel, Noah James, and George H. Xanthis.

== Series overview ==
Season	Episodes	Originally released		
Season	Episodes	First released	Last released	Network
Pilot		December 24, 2017		Facebook
1	8	April 21, 2019	November 26, 2019	VidAngel
2	8	April 4, 2021	July 11, 2021	Angel Studios; TheChosen.tv
Christmas Special		December 1, 2021		Angel Studios; TheChosen.tv
3	8	December 11, 2022 (Note: Episodes 1 & 2 of season 3 were released for an early limited theatrical run on November 18, 2022.)	February 7, 2023 (Note: Episodes 7 & 8 of season 3 were released for an early limited theatrical run on February 2, 2023.)	Angel Studios; TheChosen.tv
4	8	June 2, 2024 (Note: All episodes of season 4 were released in theaters prior to release for streaming: episodes 1–3 on February 1, 2024, episodes 4–6 on February 15, 2024, and episodes 7–8 on February 29, 2024.)	June 30, 2024	TheChosen.tv
5	8	June 15, 2025 (Note: All episodes of season 5 were released in theaters prior to release for streaming: episodes 1–2 on March 27, 2025, episodes 3–5 on April 3, 2025, and episodes 6–8 on April 10, 2025.)	June 29, 2025	TheChosen.tv (Note: Beginning with the fifth season, episodes are exclusive to Prime Video for 90 days before being made available on the website.); Amazon Prime Video
6	6	November 15, 2026 (Note: The first three episodes of season 6 were released on Amazon Prime Video on November 15, 2026, episode 4 on November 22, 2026, episode 5 on November 29, 2026, and episode 6 on December 6, 2026.)	December 6, 2026	TheChosen.tv; Amazon Prime Video

== Episodes ==
=== Pilot (2017) ===
Title	Directed by	Written by	Original release date
"The Shepherd"	Dallas Jenkins	Tyler Thompson and Dallas Jenkins	December 24, 2017
On the outskirts of Bethlehem, during the Roman occupation, Simon (Aaron Himelstein), a paralyzed shepherd, brings a lamb for sacrifice. While Simon asks the priest about the coming Messiah, the lamb he brings is discovered to have a blemish. The priest rejects it, demanding a perfect and spotless lamb. Simon hears a reading of Isaiah from a nearby synagogue and goes in, only to be expelled. On the way home, the shepherd meets a couple from Nazareth, a pregnant Mary (Sara Anne) and her husband Joseph (Raj Bond). That evening, while Simon is far from his fellow shepherds, the shepherds hear the angelic announcement of the birth of the Lamb of God, immediately heading to Bethlehem. The miraculously healed Simon follows, leaving his staff behind. The shepherds arrive and witness the birth of the Messiah. Seeing the baby, Simon asks his name, and Mary and Joseph reply that he will be called "Jesus." Leaving the manger, the shepherds tell everyone what they have seen. The priest from before asks where the spotless lamb for sacrifice is, and Simon smiles.

=== Season 1 (2019) ===
No. overall	No. in season	Title	Directed by	Written by	Original release date
1	1	"I Have Called You by Name"	Dallas Jenkins	Dallas Jenkins, Ryan Swanson and Tyler Thompson	April 21, 2019
In Capernaum, AD 26, Mary Magdalene (Elizabeth Tabish), going by the name "Lilith," wrestles with demonic possession. While the Pharisee Nicodemus (Erick Avari) is touring the region, Praetor Quintus Benedictus Dio (Brandon Potter) approaches him, demanding help collecting unpaid taxes. The tax collector Matthew (Paras Patel) deals with the turmoil of being considered a traitor by his fellow Jews. The fishermen Simon (Shahar Isaac) and his brother Andrew (Noah James) struggle with their tax debts to Rome. At a centurion's behest, Nicodemus goes to the Red Quarter to perform an exorcism on "Lilith" but fails, leaving him shaken. On tax day, Andrew cannot pay, but Simon tells Matthew that he has an arrangement with Praetor Quintus; the arrangement is to inform Praetor Quintus about his fellow Jews fishing on Shabbat, but Andrew disapproves, considering it a betrayal. Mary Magdalene loses hope for her condition until she encounters Jesus (Jonathan Roumie), who calls her by her name, healing and restoring her.
2	2	"Shabbat"	Dallas Jenkins	Dallas Jenkins, Ryan Swanson and Tyler Thompson	April 21, 2019
A recently healed Mary Magdalene prepares for Shabbat. Matthew validates Simon's claims of negotiating with Praetor Quintus. Simon continues to spy on merchants and buys drinks for them and his fellow fishermen, James (Note: Identified later in the series as Big James.) (Shayan Sobhian) and John (George H. Xanthis), sons of Zebedee (Nick Shakoour). With the approval of the Av Beit Din (Loren Lester), Nicodemus investigates the reported miracle of healing in the Red Quarter. Simon desperately fishes on Shabbat, leaving his wife Eden (Lara Silva) behind. As Mary Magdalene hosts her Shabbat dinner, she receives surprise guests, including Jesus and his students Thaddeus (Giavani Cairo) and James (Note: Identified later in the series as Little James.) (Jordan Walker Ross). Nicodemus leads the dinner with the other Pharisees. Matthew eats dinner with his dog after deciding not to have dinner with his family. Leaving the dinner with Andrew and Eden, Simon meets the Romans at the Sea of Galilee to spy on the merchants again.
3	3	"Jesus Loves the Little Children"	Dallas Jenkins	Dallas Jenkins, Ryan Swanson and Tyler Thompson	April 21, 2019
In AD 26, Jesus camps on the outskirts of Capernaum. A local girl named Abigail (Reina Ozbay) discovers the location and plays with the craftsman's tools while he is away. She invites her friend Joshua (Noah Cottrell) to see Jesus for himself. Jesus soon befriends Abigail, Joshua, and their friends in the following days. The children help Jesus with his work. Jesus teaches them about love, prayer, justice, compassion, faith, and wisdom. When the children ask why Jesus is here, Jesus reveals himself as the Messiah, reciting the words of the Prophet Isaiah. After Jesus moves camp, Abigail discovers he left a gift for her.
4	4	"The Rock on Which It Is Built"	Dallas Jenkins	Dallas Jenkins, Ryan Swanson and Tyler Thompson	April 21, 2019
At the Sea of Galilee, Simon misleads the Romans to save fellow Jews from being caught. Praetor Quintus suspects Simon of duplicity and sends Matthew to follow him. Shmuel (Shaan Sharma) and fellow Pharisees tell Nicodemus about the Baptizer on the Jordan River. Andrew runs from the Jordan River to Simon and claims the Messiah has come, as his Rabbi, John the Baptizer (David Amito), identifies the Lamb of God, but Simon prepares to fish. Andrew, Zebedee, Big James, and John arrive to help, but they catch nothing. In the morning, they see someone teaching a crowd on the shore. Andrew recognizes the teacher as Jesus, who asks to preach from their boat. After his sermon of teachings and parables, Jesus tells Simon and Andrew to cast their nets. Many fish appear, and they catch enough to pay off their debts. Simon surrenders himself to Jesus, and as Jesus invites Simon and Andrew to become fishers of men, he also calls Big James and John. Witnessing the miracle, Matthew is shocked by its impossibility. Meanwhile, Nicodemus visits the imprisoned John the Baptizer to ask about miracles.
5	5	"The Wedding Gift"	Dallas Jenkins	Dallas Jenkins, Ryan Swanson and Tyler Thompson	November 26, 2019
In Jerusalem, AD 8, Mary (Vanessa Benavente) and Joseph find the missing 12-year-old Jesus (Shayan Naveed Fazli) teaching in the Temple. In Cana, AD 26, Mary helps her friend prepare for her friend's son's wedding. Nicodemus interrogates the detained John the Baptizer concerning signs and wonders. Thomas (Joey Vahedi) and his business partner Ramah (Yasmine Al-Bustami) prepare wine for the wedding. Jesus and his students go to the wedding, while John the Baptizer explains his ministry and Jesus's ministry to Nicodemus. During the wedding, Thaddeus and Little James share how Jesus called them. Thomas and Ramah worry as the wine runs low. Mary immediately asks her son to intervene on behalf of the bridegroom's family, recalling finding young Jesus in the Temple and telling the servants to do everything Jesus says. Jesus instructs them to fill jars with water, and they obey, yet Thomas expresses doubts. Jesus prays his readiness to his Father, turning water into wine. Serving the wine, the banquet master (Phil Mendoza) acknowledges it as the best he has ever tasted. Thomas and Ramah accept the invitation to join and meet Jesus in Samaria in 12 days.
6	6	"Indescribable Compassion"	Dallas Jenkins	Dallas Jenkins, Ryan Swanson and Tyler Thompson	November 26, 2019
Matthew and the centurion, Gaius (Kirk B. R. Woller), deliver Simon's tax payment to Praetor Quintus. Following the meeting with the Av Beit Din (Ludwig Manukian), Nicodemus tries to correct Shmuel for detaining John the Baptizer. On the way back to Capernaum, a leper (Stephen Hailo) approaches Jesus and the group on the road, asking Jesus to heal him. Jesus cleanses the leper, telling him not to speak of it. The group heads to the house of Zebedee and his wife, Salome (Nina Leon). As Jesus preaches his teachings and parables, a crowd gathers, drawing the attention of both Pharisees and Romans. After witnessing the cleansing of the leper on the road earlier, an Ethiopian woman named Tamar (Amber Shana Williams) forces her way through the crowd to help her paralytic friend, Ethan (Noé de la Garza), meet Jesus. Tamar's friends climb to and remove the rooftop, lowering the paralytic. Jesus forgives the paralytic, disturbing the onlooking Pharisees. Jesus heals the paralytic, and Matthew writes down the miracle. Shmuel quickly calls on the Romans to seize Jesus. The group immediately flees, and Nicodemus seeks Mary Magdalene to meet with Jesus.
7	7	"Invitations"	Dallas Jenkins	Dallas Jenkins, Ryan Swanson and Tyler Thompson	November 26, 2019
In the Sinai Peninsula, 13th century BC, Moses (Stelio Savante) fashions a bronze serpent, much to the confusion of his assistant Joshua (Advait Ghuge). In Capernaum, AD 26, Gaius escorts Matthew to show his gratitude for his promotion. Praetor Quintus questions Nicodemus concerning the miracle worker. Jesus agrees to meet with Nicodemus by night. Matthew struggles to reconcile the miracles he has witnessed with reality and visits his mother, hoping to find answers. Meeting with Nicodemus by night, Jesus explains the Kingdom of God and being born again. Jesus describes himself as the Son of Man, using the illustration of Moses and the bronze serpent. He tells of God's love for the world and his mission to save humanity from sin. As Jesus invites Nicodemus to join him, John writes down their conversation. Nicodemus worships Jesus, declaring him as the Son of God. In the morning, Jesus and his students pass by Matthew's booth. Jesus invites Matthew to join him, and Matthew promptly follows.
8	8	"I Am He"	Dallas Jenkins	Dallas Jenkins, Ryan Swanson and Tyler Thompson	November 26, 2019
In Canaan, 1952 BC, Jacob (Amato D'Apolito) and his sons dig a well in Shechem. In Sychar, AD 26, Photina (Vanessa De Silvio), a suffering Samaritan woman, fetches water from Jacob's Well. At Matthew's house in Capernaum, Jesus answers questions from the Pharisees, including Yussif (Ivan Jasso), with the words of Hosea. Shmuel petitions Nicodemus concerning false prophecy. Jesus goes to Simon's house and heals Simon's sick mother-in-law, Dasha (Leticia Magaña). Learning Matthew quits, Praetor Quintus issues a decree against religious gatherings outside synagogues. As Jesus and his students complete their preparations to depart Capernaum, Nicodemus leaves money for them. Gaius bequeaths Matthew's wealth to Matthew's father, Alphaeus (Troy Caylak). On the road, Jesus decides to go through Samaria, much to the shock of his disciples, especially Big James (Kian Kavousi) and John. When they arrive in Sychar, the disciples go to town to buy food while Jesus stays at Jacob's Well, where he meets Photina, asking her for water. Jesus offers her "living water," expresses true worship, and announces he is the Messiah. After hearing Jesus telling her everything she did, Photina tells everyone that Jesus is the Christ. The disciples return, and Jesus publicly launches his ministry.

=== Season 2 (2021) ===
No. overall	No. in season	Title	Directed by	Written by	Original release date
9	1	"Thunder"	Dallas Jenkins	Dallas Jenkins, Ryan Swanson and Tyler Thompson	April 4, 2021
During shiva for the martyred Big James in AD 44, John interviews fellow disciples as he writes their eyewitness stories for his book. In Sychar, AD 26, Big James (Abe Martell) and John plow a field while Jesus continues to teach the Samaritans. Thomas and Ramah arrive and join the group. Ramah's father Kafni (Hassan Nazari-Robati) expresses his unbelief to Jesus and leaves blessing his daughter. Tension builds among the disciples as they wrestle with the increasing fame of Jesus in Samaria. Jesus and his students have dinner with Melech, a former robber-now-crippled, who's healed in the morning. Big James and John assume leadership roles, but the other disciples oppose their presumptions. When Big James and John try to present their plans to Jesus, a group of Samaritans shows extreme hostility towards them. Big James and John ask Jesus to rain fire to destroy the Samaritans, but Jesus rebukes Big James and John for their prejudice. After the near-violent encounter, Jesus gives them a new nickname: "the sons of thunder." Invited to a synagogue to read a scroll of Moses, Jesus reads the first scroll of Genesis, and in AD 44, John writes the introduction for his book as he reminisces it.
10	2	"I Saw You"	Dallas Jenkins	Dallas Jenkins, Ryan Swanson and Tyler Thompson	April 13, 2021
In Caesarea Philippi, Nathanael (Austin Reed Alleman) fails in his project under a Roman commission. In Bashan, Philip (Yoshi Barrigas) of Bethsaida arrives from John the Baptizer and seeks to meet Jesus, but the disciples hesitate. Simon is jealous of him as Philip begins to mentor Matthew. A grieving Nathanael sits under a fig tree, reciting a Psalm and crying out if the Lord sees him. Hearing nothing, he burns his architectural drawings of a synagogue. At night, Jesus meets and calls Philip. At the camp, Thaddeus advises Matthew, yet tension builds between Simon and Matthew. Philip visits and comforts Nathanael, telling his downcast friend about the one they have been waiting for their whole lives. Nathanael is skeptical of the one coming from Nazareth but agrees to meet Jesus, who recognizes him as a true Israelite and tells him that he saw him under the fig tree before Philip called him. Upon hearing this, Nathanael declares Jesus as his Rabbi, the Son of God, and the King of Israel. As the group heads to a new city, John arrives with a word that Jesus's fame is growing.
11	3	"Matthew 4:24"	Dallas Jenkins	Dallas Jenkins, Ryan Swanson and Tyler Thompson	April 13, 2021
In Syria, the disciples take shifts to help Jesus deal with a large crowd, hoping for healing. Philip continues to mentor Matthew while Mary Magdalene and Ramah start to study Torah. A long, exhausting day turns into night as the disciples share how they perceive the Messiah. Mary arrives from Nazareth to help with her son's students. Around the campfire, over dinner, the group tries to get to know each other better. They discuss their experiences and inner turmoil, but tensions erupt when Simon argues with Matthew about being chosen. Tempers flare as the disciples take sides, forgetting the purpose of why Jesus chose them in the first place. Suddenly, an exhausted Jesus returns and says good night to them, and Mary attends to him. The disciples listen and watch in shame.
12	4	"The Perfect Opportunity"	Dallas Jenkins	Dallas Jenkins, Ryan Swanson and Tyler Thompson	May 11, 2021
Jesse (Dennis Apergis), a paralytic, spends 38 years searching for a cure and stays at the Pool of Bethesda while his brother, Simon (Note: Identified later in the series as Simon Z.) (Alaa Safi), joins the Zealots. The Zealots plot to assassinate a Roman magistrate in Jerusalem, with Simon Z. leading, but Atticus Aemilius Pulcher (Elijah Alexander), a Roman cohorte urbanae, discovers the plan. Jesus and the disciples head to Jerusalem to prepare for the Feast of Tabernacles. Assisted in Jerusalem by fellow Pharisee Yanni (Wasim No'mani), Shmuel preaches against false prophecy. The disciples discuss the scriptures as they celebrate the feast. After being informed about Shmuel, Jesus goes to the Bethesda Pool to meet someone, bringing Simon, John, and Matthew. At Bethesda, Jesus approaches Jesse, asking him if he wants healing. Jesus heals Jesse, and John writes down the miracle. Witnessing the healing, Yanni and the other Pharisees admonish Jesse for carrying a mat on Shabbat. When the assassination plan begins, Simon Z. is distracted as he sees Jesse walking. The two brothers reconcile, and Atticus is bewildered. Jesus withdraws himself, and Simon Z. searches for him.
13	5	"Spirit"	Dallas Jenkins	Dallas Jenkins, Ryan Swanson and Tyler Thompson	May 23, 2021
Seeing a Roman, Mary Magdalene is troubled while memorizing the scriptures. Shmuel and Yanni interrogate Jesse concerning Jesus and update the petition to the Sanhedrin. Atticus questions Jesse and pursues Simon Z. and Jesus. Searching for Jesus, Simon Z. encounters a demoniac named Caleb (Anthony Michael Irizarry). John the Baptizer visits the group and tells Jesus his dangerous mission of going to Jerusalem to call out King Herod Antipas' unlawful marriage to his brother's ex-wife, Queen Herodias. When Simon Z. finds the disciples' camp, the demon-possessed Caleb attempts to attack the group. Jesus returns to the camp and heals Caleb, casting out the demon Belial, the spawn of Oriax and the Fifth Knight of Legion. Jesus calls Simon Z., who surrenders himself. John the Baptizer submits to Jesus and departs to accomplish his mission. Devastated by the encounter earlier, Mary Magdalene flees to a local tavern. Learning Mary Magdalene has gone, Jesus instructs Simon and Matthew to look for her.
14	6	"Unlawful"	Dallas Jenkins	Dallas Jenkins, Ryan Swanson and Tyler Thompson	June 23, 2021
In Nob, Israel, 1008 BC, as Ahimelech (Marty Lindsey) teaches his son, Abiathar (Major Dodge Jr.), about the shewbread, David (Jorge Franco IV) seeks him out for food. In Jericho, AD 26, Simon and Matthew try to get along as they search for Mary Magdalene in dark places. Matthew and Simon find Mary Magdalene, who is ashamed for leaving the camp and returning to her old life, and they convince her to return. At the camp, Jesus forgives Mary Magdalene for turning back. The group receives dreadful news about John the Baptizer's arrest by King Herod Antipas, distressing Andrew. Thomas informs Jesus of their lack of food, and the group goes to a synagogue in Wadi Kelt on Shabbat. In the synagogue, Jesus heals a man with a withered hand named Elam (Shaun Bedgood), upsetting the Pharisees Madai (Tony Sears) and Lamech (Sergio Lanza), and as the group leaves, Jesus permits his hungry disciples to eat and pluck grain. The Pharisees criticize them for doing this on Shabbat, and Jesus references David and the shewbread as he declares himself the Son of Man and Lord of the Sabbath.
15	7	"Reckoning"	Dallas Jenkins	Dallas Jenkins, Ryan Swanson and Tyler Thompson	June 30, 2021
Praetor Quintus sends Gaius to arrest Jesus after learning of Jesus's whereabouts from Atticus. As the group prepares for Jesus's upcoming big sermon, Andrew worries unpleasant things will happen. Shmuel returns to Capernaum with Yanni and asks Yussif about Tamar. Gaius detains Jesus, and Jesus peacefully surrenders. The disciples lose control as they argue about how to respond. In Jotapata, while seeking information about where Jesus is, Andrew and Philip encounter Tamar and her healed paralytic friend, Ethan, offering testimonies of the miracle. Praetor Quintus meets with Jesus and questions him concerning his deeds and actions. Seeing that he poses no threat, Praetor Quintus releases Jesus with a stern warning. Madai and Lamech meet Shmuel and Yanni in Jotapata and inform them about Jesus. Andrew tells Tamar and Ethan to be silent, supported by a disguised Yussif to warn them of Shmuel. Later that night, Jesus returns to his disciples. They ask him how to pray, and Jesus teaches them a prayer.
16	8	"Beyond Mountains"	Dallas Jenkins	Dallas Jenkins, Ryan Swanson and Tyler Thompson	July 11, 2021
A business apprentice (Luke Dimyan), alongside his mentor, takes advantage of land as he negotiates with the owner. Jesus and Matthew prepare the content of the upcoming Sermon. While the disciples fight amongst themselves, they spread the word and make arrangements for its location on the Mount in the Korazim Plateau. Shammai (Ric Sarabia), a high-ranking Sanhedrin member and rival of Shimon, is shocked by Shmuel and Yanni's reports on Jesus. Teaching Matthew, Jesus discusses the sections, such as Salt and Light and the Parable of the Tree and its Fruits, leading to the Beatitudes being the introduction. Thousands arrive for the Sermon, including familiar faces. Simon reunites with his wife, Eden, and Big James and John reunite with their parents, Zebedee and Salome. The apprentice, who has helped the disciples acquire the location, also arrives and meets the disciples once more, introducing himself as Judas. Jesus walks to the stage as he begins his Sermon on the Mount.

=== Christmas Special (2021) ===
Title	Directed by	Written by	Original release date
"The Messengers"	Dallas Jenkins	Ryan Swanson, Dallas Jenkins, and Tyler Thompson	December 1, 2021
In AD 48, as the Roman persecution of Christians is widespread, Tychicus (Alican Barlas), a follower of the Way, meets with Lazarus (Demetrios Troy) to help Mary Magdalene see Mary, who has a fever at that time. Mary Magdalene informs Mary about the growth of the church, the disciples' missions, and what happened to them. Afterward, Mary recounts to Mary Magdalene her experience in 4 BC, from the journey to Bethlehem, where she and her husband Joseph could not get a room at the inn, to the manger as she gives birth to Jesus. Mary shares her Psalm and gives Mary Magdalene a piece of clothing from the manger. After Mary tells her and Joseph's perspective of the birth of Jesus to Mary Magdalene, she instructs her to write down the complete story of Jesus's birth and her Psalm, then deliver them to Luke (Alex Veadov), who has been gathering eyewitness accounts regarding Jesus. In Rome, Mary Magdalene gives the account and a thorough story of Jesus's birth to Luke to include and add to Luke's writings.

=== Season 3 (2022–2023) ===
No. overall	No. in season	Title	Directed by	Written by	Original release date
17	1	"Homecoming"	Dallas Jenkins	Dallas Jenkins, Ryan Swanson and Tyler Thompson	December 11, 2022 (Note: Episodes 1 & 2 were released for an early limited theatrical run on November 18, 2022.)
In Capernaum, AD 24, Alphaeus renounces then-publicanus Matthew as his son. In the present, in the Korazim Plateau, Jesus continues to deliver the Sermon on the Mount. After the Sermon, Judas Iscariot bids goodbye to his mentor, Hadad, to follow Jesus. Jesus gathers his followers to take a break in ministry. Joanna (Amy Bailey), a woman who works in King Herod Antipas's palace in Machaerus, comes from the imprisoned John the Baptizer to support Jesus's ministry. Andrew goes with Joanna to visit John the Baptizer in prison. Upon hearing Jesus's sermon, Yussif investigates and writes a record about Jesus, sharing the written letter for Nicodemus with Jairus (Alessandro Colla), the new synagogue administrator in Capernaum. Speaking with John the Baptizer, Andrew is set straight to focus on and listen to Jesus. Judas Iscariot bequeaths his possessions to his sister and leaves to follow Jesus. Andrew apologizes to Mary Magdalene for his past actions while Matthew goes to his family's home and reconciles with Alphaeus.
18	2	"Two by Two"	Dallas Jenkins	Dallas Jenkins, Ryan Swanson and Tyler Thompson	December 18, 2022
Considering Jesus as a problem for the Romans, Atticus and Gaius report to Praetor Quintus about pilgrims from everywhere setting up a tent city at the gates of Capernaum to see Jesus, causing the redrawing of city lines. Simon Z. encounters Atticus, who demands an answer concerning what Jesus is, offering an alliance to eradicate the Zealots. At Simon's house, Jesus commissions the twelve as his chosen apostles, sending them out on a mission in every direction, two by two, to preach and proclaim the Good News of the Kingdom of Heaven. Jesus grants them authority to heal the sick and cast out demons, giving them specific instructions for their mission. After Judas Iscariot accepts the nomination from Matthew as the treasurer of the group, Jesus pairs up the apostles, creating tensions amongst them. Contemplating the mission, Little James asks Jesus why he has not been healed. Jesus comforts Little James by affirming healing one day. The apostles recite a Psalm of David together outside Matthew's former home.
19	3	"Physician, Heal Yourself"	Dallas Jenkins	Dallas Jenkins, Ryan Swanson and Tyler Thompson	December 25, 2022
Jesus returns to Nazareth to celebrate Rosh Hashanah with Mary. Having dinner in the absence of James and Jude, Jesus tells Mary how his students are doing. His childhood friends, Lazarus, Mary (Catherine Lidstone), and Martha (Sophia Cameron Blum), arrive in Nazareth from Bethany for the celebration, as do the bridegroom's parents from Cana. At the synagogue, Jesus reads a scroll from the Prophet Isaiah and declares its fulfillment on that day. Jesus uses the examples of Elijah with the widow of Zarephath and Elisha with Naaman to prove his pronouncement of salvation in the Year of Jubilee. Jesus then proclaims himself as the Messiah, enraging and upsetting the hearers. The people of Nazareth reject and condemn Jesus for his proclamation as the Law of Moses, driving him out of the town to throw him down a cliff, but Jesus passes through their midst. Jesus visits his earthly father Joseph's tomb and reminisces about the inherited bridle Joseph passed on to him.
20	4	"Clean, Part 1"	Dallas Jenkins	Dallas Jenkins, Ryan Swanson and Tyler Thompson	January 1, 2023
Two by two, the twelve apostles accomplish Jesus's commission to heal, cast out demons, and proclaim the kingdom of God. Dealing with the broken cistern, Yussif handles the sewage complication with pressure under Gaius's supervision. Jairus admits to reading Yussif's sealed account of Jesus and professes his belief. Upon returning to Simon's house, the disciples struggle to understand what happened. Struggling to reconnect with Simon, Eden meets Veronica (Zhaleh Vossough), a woman from Caesarea Philippi who has suffered from a blood discharge for twelve years. Jairus's twelve-year-old daughter, Nili (Ella McCain), becomes ill from the water, leading to Jairus questioning Yussif about Jesus. The Sanhedrin approves Shammai's proposal of a decree against false prophecy. Simon is upset as his home functions as a forum in addition to his disconnection from Eden. Taking a walk, Simon encounters and talks to Gaius at the synagogue and agrees to help fix the broken cistern. Meanwhile, Jairus's wife, Michal (Mel Mehrabian), checks on Nili and urgently calls on her husband.
21	5	"Clean, Part 2"	Dallas Jenkins	Dallas Jenkins, Ryan Swanson and Tyler Thompson	January 8, 2023
Two weeks earlier, Eden has had a miscarriage. At present, as tensions mount at home, Simon and Gaius work together to fix the water problem in Capernaum. Nathanael and Thaddeus encounter Veronica, helping her meet Jesus. Zebedee, Judas Iscariot, and the women buy an olive grove. As Nili is dying, Jairus beseeches Yussif to take him to Jesus. After Philip and Andrew ask Jesus about fasting, Jesus tells them the Parable of New Wine into Old Wineskins. Jairus and Yussif find Jesus, and Jairus desperately implores Jesus to heal his dying daughter. On the way to Jairus's house, the crowds press around Jesus. Unable to meet Jesus, Veronica desperately comes up behind Jesus and touches the fringe of his garment, ceasing her blood discharge. Perceiving it, Jesus asks who touched him, and Veronica tells him the truth. Calling her daughter, Jesus restores Veronica. Arriving at Jairus's house, Nili dies. Dismissing the mourners, Jesus takes Jairus and Michal alongside Simon, Big James, and John. Jesus declares and raises Nili from the dead, strictly charging them to tell no one about it. Veronica, Jesus, and the disciples cleanse themselves at the Sea of Galilee.
22	6	"Intensity in Tent City"	Dallas Jenkins	Dallas Jenkins, Ryan Swanson and Tyler Thompson	January 15, 2023
In Jerusalem, Pontius Pilate's wife, Claudia (Sarah J. Bartholomew), dreams about Jesus. Andrew and Philip discover from Leander (Tom Connolly), a Greek from Naveh, that their previous mission results in devastation that will require a return to the Decapolis. Atticus meets with Pontius Pilate (Andrew James Allen) in Judea to report about Praetor Quintus and discuss Jesus. From Judea, two disciples of John the Baptizer—Avner (Ash Kahn) and Nadab (Austen Parros)—come to Capernaum with a consequential question for Jesus. Simon Z. finally confronts the Zealots, who track him to Capernaum for abandoning the Fourth Philosophy, testifying to his former comrades about Jesus. As Jesus heals many people, Avner and Nadab ask Jesus, on John the Baptizer's behalf, if he is the Messiah, and Jesus answers them to tell John the Baptizer what they hear and see. Jesus recognizes John the Baptizer and proclaims the truth of the Kingdom of Heaven, illustrating from Aesop's fables and rebuking the crowds, the Zealots, and the Pharisee Akiva (Philip Shahbaz). The enlightened Zealots leave Simon Z. alone. Eden tells Simon about her miscarriage, upsetting Simon.
23	7	"Ears to Hear"	Dallas Jenkins	Dallas Jenkins, Ryan Swanson and Tyler Thompson	February 5, 2023 (Note: Episodes 7 & 8 were released for an early limited theatrical run on February 2, 2023.)
During Purim, Simon wanders in Capernaum, finally trespassing the Roman Quarter. Following an unsuccessful attempt to fix a multi-national crisis by telling the Parable of the Banquet, Andrew and Philip return from their trip with desperate news of needing Jesus's help to solve it in the Decapolis. When Mary Magdalene asks Matthew about the hidden Tzitzit, Matthew explains their significance by reminiscing his encounter with Matthew (Mike Saad), a shepherd who has witnessed the birth of Jesus (Note: As depicted in The Shepherd (2017).) and gives the prayer tassels as a gift. Gaius takes Simon into his home, revealing his sick servant, Ivo (Malachi Grayson), who is his son, too. After Jesus assigns John to bring an angry Simon to him, Jesus leads the rest on a trip to the Decapolis. Arriving in Abila, the boy Telemachus (Kace Winfield) meets Jesus, and Jesus declares then heals Telemachus's deaf-mute father, Argo (Greg Roman), strictly charging them to tell no one about it. Simon confides his situation with Eden to John. Meanwhile, Jesus and the group face opposition from all sides, including Syrophoenicians and Nabataeans.
24	8	"Sustenance"	Dallas Jenkins	Dallas Jenkins, Ryan Swanson and Tyler Thompson	February 7, 2023
In 990 BC, King David and Queen Bathsheba (Moriah Smallbone) hear a Psalm of Asaph (Pezh Maan), according to Jeduthun (Moud Sabra). At present, thousands arrive, including Arabs, Jews, and Greeks, to first argue with Jesus, and after Jesus teaches about faith, they discuss their plights. Salome, Mary Magdalene, and Dasha comfort Eden, assisting her to Yussif for Mikveh. The crowds listen to Jesus as he preaches many parables and pronounces his rest. As Jesus's preaching extends, the disciples realize thousands are hungry, and there is no food, informing Jesus. As Andrew looks for food, Telemachus shares five barley loaves and two fish. Testing Philip, Jesus asks where to buy bread. Andrew brings Telemachus's food, and Jesus blesses and multiplies them, feeding the thousands as the disciples distribute the food. With an impending storm, Jesus dismisses the thousands, sending the disciples ahead into the boat, then prays. At night, when the boat founders, the disciples struggle, and Jesus walks on the water. Jesus affirms himself after the disciples think he is a ghost. Simon walks into the water and sinks, but Jesus saves him. At the boat, Jesus and the disciples comfort Simon, and Jesus calms the storm.

=== Season 4 (2024) ===
No. overall	No. in season	Title	Directed by	Written by	Original release date
25	1	"Promises"	Dallas Jenkins	Dallas Jenkins, Ryan Swanson and Tyler Thompson	June 2, 2024 (Note: Episodes 1–3 were released in theaters February 1, 2024.)
In Judea, 4 BC, Mary visits her elderly relatives, a pregnant Elizabeth (K Callan) and her mute priestly husband Zechariah (Tony Amendola). Sharing their miraculous pregnancies announced by the Messenger, Elizabeth blesses Mary. In Machaerus, AD 29, Salome (Briar Nolet) practices her dance as part of the revengeful plan to execute John the Baptizer by her mother, Queen Herodias (Shereen Khan), during the birthday of King Herod Antipas (Paul Ben-Victor), and Joanna discovers it from her unfaithful husband, Chuza (Nick Chinlund). In Capernaum, Jairus, Yussif, and Akiva approve Zebedee's olive oil business. Joanna leaves for Capernaum after seeing John in prison, who encourages her that he has prepared the way. On King Herod Antipas' birthday, Salome dances, pleasing the drunk King Herod Antipas, who vows to give Salome whatever she asks. In 4 BC, Elizabeth gives birth. Elizabeth and Zechariah name the baby John on the bris. Regaining his voice, Zechariah praises and prophesies. In AD 29, at the execution chamber, John appreciates the vision of a Lamb, and the executioner beheads John. Avner reports the news of John's death to Jesus, mourning with sackcloth and ashes, while Andrew and the disciples learn it from Joanna.
26	2	"Confessions"	Dallas Jenkins	Dallas Jenkins, Ryan Swanson and Tyler Thompson	June 6, 2024
During shiva, Jesus dreams of John the Baptizer breaking the chains. Grieving with Andrew and Philip (Reza Diako), Jesus leads his disciples on a journey. On the road, Jesus teaches them about peace and a sword of division when Thomas and Ramah discuss their marriage plans. Returning to Caesarea Philippi, Jesus and the disciples encounter pagan altars and idols, including Baal and Pan, arriving at the Gates of Hell. Jesus instructs Matthew to write down and asks his disciples who the people say he is, receiving answers like Elijah and Jeremiah. Simon confesses Jesus as the Christ, the Son of God. Jesus blesses and elevates Simon, renaming Simon to Peter, and establishes his church, giving the keys to the Kingdom of Heaven. In Jerusalem, Shammai addresses the Sanhedrin, mentioning Shmuel's promotion, reports against Jesus, and John the Baptizer's recent death. The High Priest Caiaphas (Richard Fancy) proclaims a decree to expose Jesus, upsetting Shammai's rival, Shimon (Juri Henley-Cohn). Realizing from his discussion with Jesus, Matthew confesses his sins and asks for forgiveness from Simon Peter. Simon Peter uneasily seeks Jesus, and Jesus teaches about forgiveness. Simon Peter approaches Matthew for reconciliation, finally forgiving him.
27	3	"Moon to Blood"	Dallas Jenkins	Dallas Jenkins, Ryan Swanson and Tyler Thompson	June 9, 2024
In Jerusalem, 980 BC, King David and Queen Bathsheba mourn their child's death after praying. In Capernaum, AD 29, Thomas gives a sundial to Ramah as mohar. Outside the synagogue on Shabbat, Jesus heals a born blind man named Uzziah (Ryan Radis) with mud from saliva and well water, teaching as the Light of the World. Bringing Uzziah inside, Josiah (Steve Shermett) and Akiva interrogate Uzziah. Uzziah's father (J Santiago Suarez) and mother (Federica Estaba Rangel) arrive but fear the Pharisees, and Uzziah testifies, professing his belief. Akiva and Josiah ban Uzziah by implementing the edict and then face Jesus, who teaches true blessedness, the Sign of Jonah, and the Queen of the South. Addressing healing Uzziah, Jesus confronts the Pharisees with woes and preaches to beware of their leaven, drawing a riotous crowd. Praetor Quintus arrives to arrest Jesus, but Gaius defies his order; Quintus orders Gaius arrested instead. As the Romans try to seize Jesus, the group immediately flees, leaving behind Ramah. Praetor Quintus accidentally fatally stabs Ramah, and Atticus arrests him. Before dying, Ramah tells Thomas to stay with Jesus. Thomas desperately implores Jesus to heal Ramah, but Jesus tells Thomas that it is not her time, and the disciples mourn.
28	4	"Calm Before"	Dallas Jenkins	Dallas Jenkins, Ryan Swanson and Tyler Thompson	June 13, 2024 (Note: Episodes 4–6 were released in theaters February 15, 2024.)
Atticus supervises Quintus' demotion from being Praetor as punishment for murdering Ramah, leading to Gaius' promotion as the new Praetor. In Tel Dor, Jesus and the disciples grieve and deliver Ramah's body for burial to Ramah's father, Kafni, who curses them, and threatens to move mountains to expose Jesus. Jesus continues his ministry, including healing a demoniac, healing the blind beggar (Andrew Flagg), and traveling with rapidly growing groups of followers. Several months later, on Kislev, Thaddeus and Little James contemplate Jesus foretelling his death and resurrection, and Jesus foretells it again to them, deciding to leave Capernaum for Jerusalem. Praetor Gaius summons Simon Peter and Matthew to guarantee Jesus's safety and professes his belief. Learning about the previous trip, Salome urges Big James and John to ask Jesus for authority. At Simon Peter's house, Gaius humbly requests Jesus to heal his dying servant-son, Ivo, believing even from a distance. Jesus marvels at and acknowledges Gaius' faith, healing Ivo. Before journeying, Big James and John entreat Jesus for high-ranking status and seats in his kingdom, which upsets Jesus and aggravates a handful of the disciples. Jesus foretells his death and resurrection for the third time and emphasizes that his followers cannot focus on authority holding influence over service.
29	5	"Sitting, Serving, Scheming"	Dallas Jenkins	Dallas Jenkins, Ryan Swanson and Tyler Thompson	June 16, 2024
On the road, Judas Iscariot oversees the gifts from Joanna. In Jerusalem, the Pharisees, including Zebadiah (Brad Culver), and the Sadducees, including Gedera (Liche Ariza), debate their beliefs. With his wealth and sponsor from the Sadducee Annas, Yussif returns to Jerusalem from Capernaum to secure a seat in the Sanhedrin, reuniting with Shmuel, who introduces Yussif to the council. Jesus and the disciples head to Bethany to stay with Lazarus and his sisters, Martha and Mary, but the Romans demand them to carry their armor for a mile. Reaching one mile, Jesus goes further, recalling going two miles from his Sermon on the Mount and frustrating Judas Iscariot. Arriving at the house of Lazarus, Martha, and Mary, Jesus teaches the Parable of the Laborers in the Vineyard while Martha is busy preparing and serving. Martha tells her distracting concern of Mary, who is not helping but sitting. Jesus addresses and comforts Martha, realigning her to listen. Amidst the celebration, Jesus reunites with his mother, Mary. Judas Iscariot confusingly visits his former associate, Hadad, who incites him to scheming. Before the group leaves, Judas Iscariot secretly steals funds from the moneybag.
30	6	"Dedication"	Dallas Jenkins	Dallas Jenkins, Ryan Swanson and Tyler Thompson	June 20, 2024
In Perea, Jesus and the disciples celebrate Hanukkah or the Feast of Dedication by recounting Judas Maccabaeus and the Maccabees defeating the evil King Antiochus Epiphanes and his abomination of desolation with the Temple rededication, exchanging gifts, praying and reciting scriptures, and singing with music. Matthew confronts Judas Iscariot concerning financial irregularities, and Judas Iscariot seeks Jesus regarding funds. Amidst the celebration, Jesus learns Lazarus's sickness. In Capernaum, Jairus receives information from Yussif on the plot to kill Jesus and sends Zebedee to warn the group. The group travels to Jerusalem, where Jesus preaches the Parable of the Good Shepherd, drawing the attention of religious leaders. Pharisees and Sadducees oppose Jesus, distracting Judas Iscariot. At Solomon's Porch, Jesus confronts the religious leaders, proclaiming himself as Christ, the Son of God, and he and the Father are one. Pharisees and Sadducees attempt to stone Jesus and the disciples, hurting Big James and the rest, who escape with their lives, fleeing to Perea. Upon returning, the disciples attend to themselves while Jesus learns about Lazarus's death, deciding to return to Judea to awaken Lazarus. Thomas persuades his fellow disciples to accompany Jesus and die with him.
31	7	"The Last Sign"	Dallas Jenkins	Dallas Jenkins, Ryan Swanson and Tyler Thompson	June 23, 2024 (Note: Episodes 7–8 were released in theaters February 29, 2024.)
In the future, in Gaul, an elderly Matthew visits an elderly Mary Magdalene in a cave to deliver the complete account of his book and news of the death of Little James amidst persecution in Lower Egypt. In AD 29, Jesus and the disciples arrive in Bethany, where Martha meets them and expresses her disappointing grief and belief in Jesus. As the resurrection and the life, Jesus comforts Martha and calls for Mary. The mourners follow Mary, who also meets the group and expresses her disappointing grief. Perceiving the suffering of those surrounding him and bearing the weight of his mission alone, Jesus weeps. Arriving at Lazarus's tomb, Jesus commands to remove the stone, reaffirming the need for faith. Jesus prays to his Father and raises Lazarus from the dead, disturbing a Sadducee, and John writes down the miracle. Judas Iscariot rejoices, yet Thomas angrily resents Jesus for bringing Lazarus back to life but not Ramah or John the Baptizer. Jesus comforts Thomas, reassuring understanding of the Father's will. The disciples argue while Jesus speaks with Lazarus concerning his impending death. Several decades later, Mary Magdalene and Matthew reminisce about the last sign of Jesus.
32	8	"Humble"	Dallas Jenkins	Dallas Jenkins, Ryan Swanson and Tyler Thompson	June 30, 2024 (Note: Episode 8, originally planned for streaming release June 27, 2024, was delayed due to the scheduled US Presidential debate.)
Several centuries ago in Jerusalem, King David triumphantly enters the city after defeating Ammonites and celebrates Passover with his wife, Abigail (Angelica Amor), and their son, Daniel (Bryce Robin), by anointing a sacrificial lamb. In Jerusalem, AD 30, six days before Passover, Jesse and Veronica share their miraculous testimonies regarding Jesus. In the Sanhedrin, Caiaphas leads the plot to kill Jesus by cooperating with Rome when discussing Lazarus. In Bethany, Yussif and Shmuel visit Lazarus to warn Jesus. Jesus tells the Parable of the Sheep and the Goats and gives the New Commandment to love one another. After purchasing pure spikenard, Mary arrives and anoints Jesus, troubling Judas Iscariot and Shmuel. Judas Iscariot and Shmuel scold Mary, but Jesus rebukes them and acknowledges Mary for his burial preparation. Over dinner, King Herod Antipas, Pontius Pilate, and Queen Herodias discuss their interest in Jesus and his fame, alongside the plot to kill Lazarus, while Claudia and Joanna discuss Chuza. On Mount Olivet, Jesus sends Matthew and Simon Z. to borrow a donkey's colt to fulfill Zechariah's prophecy. As the crowds take palm branches to welcome Jesus, Jesus expresses his love for the disciples and prepares to enter Jerusalem triumphantly.

=== Season 5 (2025) ===
No. overall	No. in season	Title	Directed by	Written by	Original release date
Last Supper: Part 1
33	1	"Entry"	Dallas Jenkins	Dallas Jenkins, Ryan Swanson and Tyler Thompson	June 15, 2025 (Note: Episodes 1–2 were released in theaters March 28, 2025 as The Chosen Last Supper: Part 1.)
The episode opens with Jesus officiating over the Last Supper with his disciples. He alludes to his coming trial, crucifixion and death, and warns that one of them will betray him. Four days earlier, Jesus and his followers enter Jerusalem, where they are greeted by a crowd who believe Jesus is their Messiah. A group of rabbis unsuccessfully attempt to convince Jesus to turn back. Roman and Jewish religious spies monitor the group. Phoebe hosts Jesus and his followers. While in Jerusalem, Jesus experiences visions of his coming trials and is distressed by the corruption and profiteering at the Second Temple. Jesus makes arrangements for Zebedee to take his mother Mary and his two sisters back to Lazarus for safekeeping. Meanwhile, John begins to question Jesus's decisions, confiding in Mary Magdalene. The new Roman Governor Pontius Pilate also attempts to ingratiate himself with High Priest Caiaphas before the upcoming Passover celebrations.
34	2	"House of Cards"	Dallas Jenkins	Dallas Jenkins, Ryan Swanson and Tyler Thompson	June 15, 2025
The episode begins with Jesus preaching to His disciples during the Last Supper about arming and equipping themselves for a hostile world. He also warns Simon Peter that He will deny him three times before telling his disciples to meet Him in Galilee following His resurrection. In a flashback scene, Ramah's parents prepare her for her betrothal to Thomas. In the present, Ramah's grieving father Kafni blames Thomas and Jesus for causing her death while Ramah's mother Naomi (Anna Khaja) stands by her late daughter's decision. In Jerusalem, Andrew gives Peter advice about preaching. Andrew and Philip meet Gentile believers Tamar and Leander, who have come to offer sacrifices for the upcoming Passover. The money changers and merchants take advantage of them by charging high exchange rates and fees. Meanwhile, Caiaphas and King Herod Antipas discuss plans to eliminate Jesus in order to preserve their interests. Enraged by the corruption and exploitation at the Temple marketplace, Jesus uses a whip to drive the merchants and money changers from the square, drawing the attention of the Jewish religious leaders, Herod, and Governor Pilate. Judas Iscariot thinks Jesus has gone mad.
Last Supper: Part 2
35	3	"Woes"	Dallas Jenkins	Dallas Jenkins, Ryan Swanson and Tyler Thompson	June 22, 2025 (Note: Episodes 3–5 were released in theaters April 4, 2025 as The Chosen Last Supper: Part 2.)
The episode opens with Jesus telling his disciples about the Holy Spirit during the Last Supper. As the disciples react with bewilderment, Jesus alludes to the events of his trial and crucifixion. Prior to the Last Supper, Jesus warns the religious leaders about the Second Temple's coming destruction by the Romans. Following Jesus's cleansing of the Temple marketplace, disciples deliberate over His outburst while Mary Magdalene departs to seek help. Following a meeting with Governor Pilate, Caiaphas and Rabbi Shmuel come up with a plan to entrap Jesus by getting him to say something incriminating. The religious leaders interrupt Jesus' sermon and ask whether he gets his authority from God or humanity. Jesus responds by asking them whether John the Baptist received his authority from God or humanity. He then uses the Parable of the Tenants to attack the hypocrisy and corruption of the religious elite. Following the sermon, Jesus retreats to the Mount of Olives with a select group of disciples including Simon Peter, where he warns them about coming persecution.
36	4	"The Same Coin"	Dallas Jenkins	Dallas Jenkins, Ryan Swanson and Tyler Thompson	June 22, 2025
The episode opens with Jesus and the disciples sharing food at the Last Supper. Judas attempts to reason with Jesus before proceeding with his plan to betray Jesus. Prior to the Last Supper, the religious leaders including Rabbi Shmuel and Yussif convene and decide to arrest Jesus at night in order to avoid provoking public unrest. Yussif is more sympathetic to Jesus than Shmuel, who views him as a threat to public order. Jesus spends one on one time with his disciples including John and Judas. While John overcomes his unforgiveness, Judas is angry with Jesus for not leading a rebellion against the Romans and decides to plot against him. Jesus, his disciples and their female followers travel to Martha and Lazarus' house in the Mount of Olives. On the way, Jesus curses a fig tree for not bearing fruit. Later that night, he has a Dayenu with his female followers including Mary Magdalene, Martha, and Joanna.
37	5	"Because of Me"	Dallas Jenkins	Dallas Jenkins, Ryan Swanson and Tyler Thompson	June 22, 2025
During the Last Supper, the disciples argue over whether who is the traitor among them. Jesus leads them in completing the Dayenu phase of the Passover supper. As the disciples return to Jerusalem, Jesus takes the opportunity to lecture about the now shriveled fig tree. Upon returning to Phoebe's home, the disciples argue about Jesus' warnings about his coming death and future persecution. Meanwhile, the religious leaders gather to plot against Jesus, with Caiaphas praying for God to give them a "solution." Atticus warns Governor Pilate that the religious leaders are plotting against Jesus and arrests a group of Jewish militants led by Kafni. Disenchanted with Jesus, Judas meets with Caiaphas and Shmuel, and agrees to betray Jesus. Meanwhile, Mary Magdalene is kidnapped by two men who bring her to Nicodemus.
Last Supper: Part 3
38	6	"Reunions"	Dallas Jenkins	Dallas Jenkins, Ryan Swanson and Tyler Thompson	June 29, 2025 (Note: Episodes 6–8 were released in theaters April 11, 2025 as The Chosen Last Supper: Part 3.)
During the Last Supper, Jesus institutes the Eucharist and warns about the consequences of betraying Him. Eight months earlier, Nicodemus meets with Zebadiah to discuss Jesus's ministry. Prior to the Last Supper, Nicodemus meets separately with both Mary Magdalene and Yussif and confides that he believes Jesus is the Messiah. He warns Mary that the religious leaders are plotting against Jesus. Meanwhile, Judas agrees to betray Jesus in return for 30 pieces of silver. Atticus strikes a deal with Kafni, who agrees to incite public opinion against Jesus in return for avoiding arrest. Naomi disapproves of her husband Kafni's vendetta against Jesus stemming from the death of their daughter Ramah. Atticus also warns Simon the Zealot about the coming troubles facing Jesus.
39	7	"The Upper Room: Part I"	Dallas Jenkins	Dallas Jenkins, Ryan Swanson and Tyler Thompson	June 29, 2025
The episode opens with Jesus washing his disciples' feet prior to the Last Supper. Earlier in the day, Jesus sends Peter and John to rent an upper room in the southern portion of the Upper City for the Passover Seder due to concerns about the safety and ritual cleanliness of Phoebe's home. Following Jesus's instructions, the two disciples meet a young man named John Mark whose father allows them to rent his upper room for Passover. Judas Iscariot has a reunion with his older sister Devorah but conceals his plot to betray Jesus. The disciples Simon the Zealot, Nathanael, Philip, Thomas, Matthew and Little James experience flashbacks into their past lives before following Jesus.
40	8	"The Upper Room: Part II"	Dallas Jenkins	Dallas Jenkins, Ryan Swanson and Tyler Thompson	June 29, 2025
In a flashback, Jesus recruits a stonemason Thaddaeus into his ministry. In the present, Thaddaeus is the last disciple to join the Last Supper, a reference to Jesus's teaching that the "first will be last." John Mark listens to the Last Supper. Caiaphas convenes an emergency meeting of the Sanhedrin but is chastised by Nicodemus. Meanwhile, Pilate meets with Atticus and Claudia to discuss the so-called threat posed by Jesus. Jesus and his disciples with the exception of Judas Iscariot gather at the Garden of Gethsemane. While the others gather outside, Peter, James and John accompany Jesus into the inner sanctum of the garden, where he communes with God the Father. Jesus asks God to take the "cup" away from him three times, experiencing flashbacks of Abraham and his son Isaac, and Ezekiel's Vision of the Valley of Dry Bones. Jesus submits to his Father's will and is briefly visited by Joseph (his mother Mary's late husband), who comforts him. Shortly later, Jesus and his disciples are surrounded by several Temple guards, religious leaders, and Kafni. As arranged, Judas identifies Jesus with a kiss.

=== Season 6 (2026) ===
No. overall	No. in season	Title	Directed by	Written by	Original release date
41	1	"Dawning"	Dallas Jenkins	Ryan Swanson, Tyler Thompson and Dallas Jenkins	November 15, 2026
Nicodemus challenges the Sanhedrin's meeting on legal grounds and convinces Caiaphas to delay Jesus's trial until the following day. A heavenly host converges around Jerusalem and the Garden of Gethsemane, ready to rescue Jesus. After Judas identifies Jesus, he is detained by the Temple guards and religious authorities. Peter slices off Malchus' ear but Jesus heals him before surrendering himself. Jesus convinces the Temple authorities to let the disciples go. The disciples inform Jesus's female followers about Jesus's arrest. After coming to terms with Judas's betrayal and debating what to do next, the disciples pray about the situation. Seeking to take action into their own hands, Peter and John infiltrate the Temple, intent on rescuing Jesus and seeking revenge against Judas.
42	2	"2:30am - 4:00am"	Dallas Jenkins	Ryan Swanson, Tyler Thompson and Dallas Jenkins	November 15, 2026
Malchus helps John to get into the Temple courtyard and speaks with Judas Iscariot, who rationalizes that he did not betray Jesus but was helping him to fulfill a prophecy. Malchus informs John that Nicodemus has convinced Caiaphas to try Jesus in a religious court. The other disciples including Matthias debate their next moves and Jesus's last teachings and messages before his arrest. Caiaphas and Nicodemus question Jesus about his association with sinners and Gentiles. While Nicodemus wants to save Jesus, Caiaphas seeks a pretext to hand him over to the Roman authorities in order to save the Jewish nation.
43	3	"4:00am - 5:00am"	Dallas Jenkins	Ryan Swanson, Tyler Thompson and Dallas Jenkins	November 15, 2026
In a flashback, Mary and Joseph return from Egypt with a toddler Jesus. In the present, Jesus's females followers manage to get past a Roman sentry and enter Jerusalem. Caiaphas manages to file charges against Jesus after submitting testimony claiming that Jesus would destroy the Temple. Peter confronts Judas Iscariot who rationalizes that he was trying to either prompt Jesus to act as Messiah or expose him as false. Some servants recognize Peter but he denies Jesus three times before the rooster crows.
44	4	"5:00am - 6:00am"	Dallas Jenkins	Ryan Swanson, Tyler Thompson and Dallas Jenkins	November 22, 2026
During the Sanhedrin's trial of Jesus, Nicodemus attempts to defend Jesus by sending Matthias to bring Big James to testify in Jesus's defense. Before Matthias and Big James can reach the Temple, Jesus proclaims himself as Christ, prompting Caiaphas and the other religious leaders to convict him of blasphemy. Since they do not have the power to execute Jesus, they send him to Governor Pontius Pilate to give a final verdict. A guilt-ridden Judas regrets his role in Jesus's betrayal and unsuccessfully attempts to stop the trial and return the 30 pieces of silver. After reminiscing on his prior relationship with Jesus, Judas buys a rope. Judas's older sister Devorah seeks out Jesus's disciples and female followers for information about her brother's whereabouts. While Jesus's disciples and followers go into hiding, Caiaphas's wife Shoshana confronts her husband for concealing information about Jesus's miracles from her. Judas hangs himself in a field called Akeldama.
45	5	"6:00am - 7:00am"	Dallas Jenkins	Ryan Swanson, Tyler Thompson and Dallas Jenkins	November 29, 2026
46	6	"7:00am - 8:30am"	Dallas Jenkins	Ryan Swanson, Tyler Thompson and Dallas Jenkins	December 6, 2026
