= Movieguide Awards =

Annual American movie and television awards

The Movieguide Awards
- Previous: 2026 Movieguide Awards; February 6, 2026; Next: 2027 Movieguide Awards; TBD
- Awarded for: Promotion of Christian values
- Country: United States
- Presented by: Movieguide
- First award: February 10, 1993; 33 years ago
- Website: movieguideawards.com

The Movieguide Awards is an annual award ceremony for Christian entertainment held every year in Hollywood and broadcast on the Hallmark Channel around the same time as the Academy Awards. The awards are commonly described as "The Christian Oscars" in industry circles.

== History ==
In 1985 Ted Baehr of the Christian Film & Television Commission created Movieguide, a family guide to movies and entertainment.

In 1988 conversations began with Sir John Templeton resulting in the Annual Movieguide Faith & Values Awards Gala debuting in 1993 with funding from the John Templeton Foundation.

Since then, Movieguide's Annual Faith & Values Awards Gala has grown into a televised event that has been hosted by such celebrities as Terry Crews, Chuck Norris, Sadie Robertson, Bill Engvall, and Joe Mantegna.

In 2014, The New Yorker noted that the Movieguide Awards have become more politicized following funding from the right-wing lobbyists.

The trophies are shaped like teddy bears, a subtle nod to Movieguide CEO and Founder Dr. Ted Baehr.

== Awards ==
Annually, a panel of judges decide who should receive each award. In 2019 the panel included Dr. Ted Baehr; Cindy Bond, producer of I Can Only Imagine; Cale Boyter, a film producer; DeVon Franklin, CEO of Franklin Entertainment; Mike Medavoy, a film producer; Robert Norton, Group CFO for Animal Logic One; David Outten, a former Disney artist; Rich Peluso, Executive Vice President of Affirm Films; Pablo Perex De Rosso, Director in the content team of Netflix; Cary Solomon and Chuck Konzelman, the writing and production team of God's Not Dead; and, Simon Swart, a 25-year studio veteran.

=== The Epiphany Prize ===
The two Epiphany Prizes for Inspiring Movies & TV are specifically for entertaining movies and television programs that are wholesome, spiritually uplifting and inspirational.

=== The Faith and Freedom Award ===
The Faith & Freedom Award for Movies & TV is awarded to entertainment that promotes positive American values. The values considered include values such as liberty, religious freedom, freedom of speech, the right to vote, property rights, proper compassion for others, protection of the innocent, the right to due process, the right to life, the right to pursue happiness, the rule of law, democracy, the free market, ownership of private property, and many other traditional values.

=== Best Movies and TV for Children ===
In the 2026 Movieguide Awards, awards were given to the Best Movie and TV/Streaming for Children.

=== Best Movies and TV for Families ===
Movieguide's editorial staff views and analyzes every major movie released that makes over $1 million and compiles the Ten Best Movies for Families. Each nominee receives a "Teddy 'The Good News' Bear" Family Friendly Awards for Excellence, and one is picked as the Best Movie for Families at the Annual Movieguide Awards.

=== Best Movies and TV for Mature Audiences ===
The nominees for Best Movies for Mature Audiences are picked by the editorial staff of Movieguide, and awarded to movies made with excellence, and also contain strong moral and redemptive themes. These nominees receive the "Papa Bear" Award for Excellence, and may contain subject matter not appropriate for young children.

=== The Grace Award for Acting ===
The Grace Award for Most Inspiring Performances in Movies and Television are given to the most inspiring performances that demonstrate God's grace and love towards us as human beings.

=== The Genesis Award ===
In the 2020 Movieguide Awards, the Genesis Award was given to movies or television programs that promoted the blessings that the animal kingdom provides to humankind.

=== Most Inspirational Independent Movie and Streaming/Television ===
In the 2023 Movieguide Awards, awards were given to the most inspirational independent movie, and the most independent streaming/television program.

=== The Aletheia Award ===
The Aletheia Award is given to the Best Documentary.

=== The Kairos Prize ===
Established by Movieguide in 2005, the purpose of the Kairos Prize for Beginning and Established Screenwriters is to further the influence of moral and spiritual values within the film and television industries. Seeking to promote a spiritually uplifting, redemptive worldview, the prize was founded to inspire first-time and beginning screenwriters to produce compelling, entertaining, spiritually uplifting scripts that result in a greater increase in either man's love or understanding of God. Each year, at least $30,000 in prizes is given out to the winning screenwriters.

The 2017 film All Saints, from Sony Pictures, was the first Kairos Prize Finalist to be released nationwide by a major studio.
