= The Chosen in the Wild with Bear Grylls =

American reality television series

- Genre: Reality television
- Created by: Dallas Jenkins
- Directed by: Robert Austin Vanover
- Starring: Bear Grylls; Dallas Jenkins; Jonathan Roumie; Paras Patel; Elizabeth Tabish; Noah James; Luke Dimyan
- Country of origin: United States
- No. of seasons: 1
- No. of episodes: 6

Production
- Executive producers: Bear Grylls; Dallas Jenkins, Brad Pelo; Katherine Warnock; Ben Simon; Delbert Shoopman; Ben Mitchell; Rick Murray; Brent Ryan Green; Ryan Swanson; Tyler Thompson
- Production companies: 5&2 Studios; The Natural Studios; Workerbee

Original release
- Network: Amazon Prime Video
- Release: August 9, 2026

The Chosen in the Wild with Bear Grylls is an American reality television series that is a spinoff of Dallas Jenkins's Christian historical drama series The Chosen. The series features British adventurer, television presenter and former Special Air Service (SAS) soldier Bear Grylls and showrunner Jenkins leading several cast members of The Chosen including Jonathan Roumie, Paras Patel, Elizabeth Tabish, Noah James and Luke Dimyan on an outdoor wilderness tour in Utah and New York. The Chosen in the Wild consists of six unscripted episodes and was released on Amazon Prime Video on August 9, 2026.

== Premise ==
The Chosen in the Wild with Bear Grylls features The Chosen showrunner and executive producer Dallas Jenkins, cast members Jonathan Roumie, Paras Patel, Elizabeth Tabish, Noah James and Luke Dimyan accompanying British adventurer, television presenter and soldier Bear Grylls on an outdoor wilderness tour spanning Utah's Castle Valley and Canyonlands National Park, the Colorado River, Great Basin Desert, and New York's Ausable River and Adirondack Park.

== Episodes ==
No. overall	No. in season	Title	Original release date
1	1	"The Chosen in the Wild with Bear Grylls: Luke Dimyan"	August 9, 2026
Luke Dimyan (who plays Judas Iscariot) explores Utah's Castle Valley with Bear Grylls. The two parachute out of a helicopter into the valley with the help of stunt crew. Dimyan shares about his experiences growing up as an Egyptian Copt and pursuing an acting career despite his parents' initial objections. He also talks about how his late grandfather encouraged his acting career. Grylls teaches him bushcraft and desert survival skills, while sharing about how his late father encouraged his Christian faith. The duo and their film crew also cross a canyon using a flying fox and abseil up a cliff to reach their extraction point. Dimyan uses a flare to signal to a helicopter, which uses a pulley system to extract them.
2	2	"The Chosen in the Wild with Bear Grylls: Elizabeth Tabish"	August 9, 2026
Elizabeth Tabish (who plays Mary Magdalene) explores Utah's Canyonlands National Park with Grylls and his crew. During their trip, Tabish shares about her struggle with depression and finding comfort and strength in her Christian faith. In return, Grylls teaches her some desert survival skills including the important of hydration and dealing with snakes and scorpions. Grylls also shares about how The Chosen TV series launched her acting career. Besides using a flying fox, the two also do abseiling and rendezvous with a helicopter at their extraction point.
3	3	"The Chosen in the Wild with Bear Grylls: Dallas Jenkins"	August 9, 2026
Showrunner Dallas Jenkins goes on an outdoor excursion with Bear Grylls in New York state's Ausable River. During his time with Grylls, Jenkins talked about navigating failure while launching his film-making career and turning to his wife Amanda and God for support. Grylls teaches Jenkins some wilderness techniques including building an improvised rope bridge and identifying sources of nourishment. The two also swim in the Ausable River and end the excursion by dangling from their helicopter.
4	4	"The Chosen in the Wild with Bear Grylls: Noah James"	August 9, 2026
Noah James (who plays Andrew the Apostle) goes on an outdoor excursion with Bear Grylls along the Colorado River. Their excursion involves abseiling down a cliff-face using nets and cables. During the hike, James talks about his film career including getting cast as Andrew after unsuccessfully auditioning for Dallas Jenkins' short film, The Shepherd. James also shares about his recent marriage. Reaching their extraction point, they are airlifted by Grylls' helicopter.
5	5	"The Chosen in the Wild with Bear Grylls: Paras Patel"	August 9, 2026
Paras Patel (who plays Matthew the Apostle) accompanies Bear Grylls on an outdoor excursion in the Great Basin Desert using a bag of rope and a compass. Patel shares about his Indian American immigrant background including growing up in a Hindu family before converting to Christianity. He was inspired to pursue a career in acting by Bollywood and also talks about his involvement with The Chosen TV series. During the excursion, the two abseil down cliffs and wrangle with snakes. Patel also grapples with his fear of snakes and claustrophobia.
6	6	"The Chosen in the Wild with Bear Grylls: Jonathan Roumie"	August 9, 2026
Jonathan Roumie (who plays Jesus Christ) accompanies Bear Grylls on an outdoor excursion in Adirondack Park. After parachuting into the park via helicopter, the two do abseiling, tramping and canoeing. Roumie shares about his Christian faith as well as his mixed Irish and Egyptian heritage. Grylls teaches Roumie some bush survival techniques including grilling food and rope climbing.

== Production ==
=== Development ===
On September 20, 2024, Dallas Jenkins announced that his production company 5&2 Studios was developing several spinoff TV projects set in the universe of The Chosen TV series at the 2024 ChosenCon (The Chosen Insiders Conference) fan convention in Orlando. These TV projects included The Chosen in the Wild with Bear Grylls, a six-episode unscripted reality television series jointly produced by The Natural Studios and 5&2 Studios. This reality series would feature survivalist and adventurer Bear Grylls taking Jenkins and several The Chosen cast members on an outdoor wilderness excursion. The series would focus on Grylls traveling with a cast member to learn about their perspective of The Chosen and personal stories. In addition, the series would involve Grylls putting Jenkins and cast members through several challenges similar to his television series Running Wild with Bear Grylls.

Grylls's involvement in the series was motivated by his personal Christian faith. In 2025, Grylls had released his biographical novelization of the life of Jesus Christ, entitled The Greatest Story Ever Told: An Eyewitness Account.

=== Casting ===
Besides Jenkins and Grylls, other participants in The Chosen in the Wild included The Chosen cast members Jonathan Roumie, Paras Patel, Elizabeth Tabish, Noah James and Luke Dimyan.

=== Filming ===
The Chosen in the Wild was produced jointly by 5&2 Studios, The Natural Studios and Workerbee. The series was directed by Robert Austin Vanover. It was executively produced by Grylls, Jenkins, Brad Pelo, Katherine Warnock, Ben Simon, Delbert Shoopman, Ben Mitchell, Rick Murray, Brent Ryan Green, Ryan Swanson, and Tyler Thompson. Filming for the series took place in several locations including Castle Valley, Canyonlands National Park, the Colorado River, Great Basin Desert, Ausable River and Adirondack Park.

== Marketing and release ==
Amazon Prime Video released an official trailer for The Chosen in the Wild on July 23, 2026. The series premiered on Amazon Prime Video on August 9, 2026.

== Reception ==
Lucy Mangan of The Guardian gave the series a positive review, awarding it three out of five stars. She wrote "in a world of toxic masculinity, this feels radical at points." Mangan observed that each episode focused on Grylls' interaction with a cast member.
