= The Chosen Adventures =

American animated children's television series

- Genre: Christian; Adventure
- Created by: Dallas Jenkins
- Showrunner: Ryan Swanson
- Directed by: Keith Alcorn
- Voices of: Jonathan Roumie; Romy Fay; Paul Walter Hauser; Elizabeth Tabish; Yvonne Orji; Danny Nuci; Jordin Sparks
- Country of origin: United States
- Original language: English
- No. of episodes: 14

Production
- Executive producers: Dallas Jenkins; Ryan Swanson; Chris Juen; Chad Gunderson; Keith Alcorn; Kellen Erksine; Derral Eves
- Producers: Erin Elizabeth Gardner; Myesha Gosselin
- Running time: 11 minutes
- Production companies: 5&2 Studios; Amazon MGM Studios

Original release
- Network: Amazon Prime Video; Minno
- Release: October 17, 2025

The Chosen Adventures is an American animated Christian children's television series created by filmmaker Dallas Jenkins. It is an animated spinoff of the live-action Christian historical drama television series The Chosen. The series is the first in a series of Bible-inspired stories that is co-produced by Amazon MGM Studios and Jenkins' company 5&2 Studios. The series depicts the life of Jesus through the eyes of two children named Abby and Joshua. The voice cast includes Jonathan Roumie as Jesus, Romy Fay as Abby, Paul Walter Hauser as Sheep, Elizabeth Tabish as Mary Magdalene, Yvonne Orji as Pigeon, Danny Nuci as Abba and Jordin Sparks as Fish. The series was directed by Keith Alcorn, and released on Amazon Prime Video on October 17, 2025.

== Premise ==
The Chosen Adventures follows the adventures of nine-year old Abby, her friend Joshua, and their animal friends Sheep and Pigeon during the time of the New Testament Gospels. They meet Jesus during their adventures in Galilee. The series seeks to teach young viewers about faith, friendship, God's love and Jesus's message.

== Voice cast and characters ==
=== Starring ===
- Paul Walter Hauser as Sheep
- Yvonne Orji as Pigeon
- Romy Fay as Abby
- Jude Zarzaur as Joshua
- Danny Nuci as Abba
- Zehra Fazal as Eema

=== Recurring and guests ===
- Jonathan Roumie as Jesus
- Jordin Sparks as Fish
- Paras Patel as Matthew
- Elizabeth Tabish as Mary Magdalene
- Noah James as Andrew
- Joey Vahedi as Thomas
- George H. Xanthis as John
- Yasmine Al-Bustami as Ramah
- Brandon Potter as Quintus
- Banks Pierce as Hilarius Maximus
- Julian Grant as Cyrius Maximus

== Episodes ==
No. overall	No. in season	Title	Written by	Original release date
1	1	"Jesus Loves the Little Children (And Their Parents, Too)"	Ryan Swanson, Kelley Erskine, Rachel Sondag and Keith Alcorn	October 17, 2025
Abby is a curious and inquisitive girl who lives in Capernaum with her parents Abba and Eema. She wants to go to school with her friend Joshua, who studies at the local synagogue, but is unable to attend due to her gender. Abby also befriends a talking sheep and a pigeon. While she and Joshua are exploring a play area outside Joshua's home, they encounter a friendly carpenter from Nazareth named Jesus, who also describes himself as a teacher. Jesus impresses Abby by answering her question about the purpose of wasps, explaining that they help to pollinate fig trees. When Abby confides about her frustration with her parent not being able to answer her questions, Jesus counsels her to respect and understand them. Later, Abby convinces her parents to let her keep Sheep and Pigeon.
2	2	"Give It a Rest"	Kelley Erskine, Keith Alcorn, Wes Halula (screenwriters), and Ryan Swanson (story)	October 17, 2025
Abby and her parents are unable to get meat and bread from the marketplace before Shabbat, which begins at dusk. Unable to make a fire to bake bread or illuminate their home, the family is forced to improvise. When Abby asks why they rest on the Sabbath, Abba and Eema explain the Genesis creation narrative with the help of Sheep and Pigeon. Eema also serves carrots and olive dip for dinner. The family and their animals then spend the Sabbath night gazing at the stars and reflecting on God's creation.
3	3	"Why, God?!"	Keith Alcorn (screenwriter), Jalein Abania and Keith Alcorn (story)	October 17, 2025
Eema sends Abby to fetch flour from Joshua, a pie from the ofe, and a vase from the potter. Aby is accompanied by Sheep and Pigeon. During the errand, Abby loses one of her sandals and the shopping list, which causes frustration and confusion. She gets flour from Joshua but drops the contents. While picking up the pie, she accidentally drops it. Abby returns with the vase stuck on her head. When she returns home, Abby expresses frustration and asks why God gives her "bad days." Back at home, Eema reassures her daughter by telling her that she can bring her "difficult things" to God. Pigeon tells Sheep that Abby's mistakes came out for the better: Abby avoided being forced by a Roman soldier to carry his armor, the pie she dropped fed a hungry child, and that Sheep guided the temporarily blind Abby home.
4	4	"Not What I Imagined"	Kellen Erskine	October 17, 2025
Abby accompanies Eema to the synagogue with the other women but is bored by Rabbi Josiah's dry sermon, drawing upon passages from Isaiah. Abby combats boredom by trying to picture Josiah's sermon about the sheep lying with the wolf. However, Abby and Eema take an interest in guest speaker Jesus's sermon, who talks about everyone taking something new from the Scripture and alludes to the coming Messiah. Meanwhile, Abba travels around Capernaum in search of Sheep, who hides on the roof of the house with Pigeon. When Abby returns, Sheep emerges from hiding.
5	5	"Little Caesar"	Andrew Simmons	October 17, 2025
A new Roman centurion named Cyrius Maximus and his son Hilarius Maximus move into Capernaum. Cyrius establishes himself as a bully who exploits the local population. The pampered Hilarius attempts to befriend Abby and Joshua while playing several games including hide and seek, "Roam the Desert", "Cross the Quicksand" and running a play store but doesn't know how to play by the rules, only knowing how to play a Roman soldier. Abby decides to teach Hilarius a lesson by role playing a Roman soldier and getting Hilarius to role play a Jewish citizen. The three children bond while watching clouds with Sheep and Pigeon. Having interacted with the Jewish children, Hilarius treats the local citizens with more respect, returning a cloak that his father seized from a local boy and declining a stolen bunch of grapes.
6	6	"Vengeance is Whose?"	Kellen Erskine	October 17, 2025
Following a spat with another girl named Yael, an angry Abby accidentally breaks her mother Eema's favorite vase while cleaning it. At the suggestion of Joshua, Abby seeks vengeance against Yael under the principle of an "Eye for an eye." Hilarius by contrast suggests a more conciliatory response. Before Abby can put her plan into action, the children are visited by Jesus, who explains that the principle of an "Eye for an eye" is meant for judges and other figures. He counsels Abby to forgive and make amends with Yael, who apologizes to Abby. Abby later admits to breaking the vase to Eema, who forgives her daughter.
7	7	"Rocky Ground"	Kelly Vrooman and Wes Halula	October 17, 2025
Abby attempts to befriend her new elderly neighbours Dinah and Bart with a young fig plant as a welcoming gift. However, Dinah initially rebuffs Abby's attempt at friendship. Abby is initially bitter towards Dinah and irritated with Sheep for attempting to eat the fig plant, which withers due to exposure to dust. After watching Jesus preach the Parable of the Sower and summon fish to Simon Peter and Andrew's boat, Abby decides to give Dinah another chance. Dinah accepts Abby's friendship and helps her to plant the fig plant, which recovers.
8	8	"Blind Faith"	Kellen Erskine	October 17, 2025
Against her father's instructions, Abby attempts to explore the other side of the Sea of Galilee with Sheep and Pigeon. While attempting to retrieve a stone, Abby causes her boat to go adrift. She attempts to row back to shore but ends up rowing in circles due to her lack of experience. In desperation, she prays to God and seeks forgiveness for disobeying her Abba. Jesus, who is walking along the shore, causes the boat to drift back to shore. After talking about the importance of listening to her parents' rules and boundaries, Jesus brings her back to her family where she reconciles with her father. Sheep is hungry for fibre and settles for dates.
9	9	"Father Knows Bass"	Andrew Simmons and Kellen Erskine	October 17, 2025
Unable to answer Abby's questions about the position of fish in the Genesis creation narrative, Abba ("Eli") visits his former rabbi at the local synagogue. While Eli believes himself to be a failure because he left school at the age of ten to help his father's fishing career, the rabbi reassures Eli that God has a purpose for everyone. Later, Abba catches up with Abby, who is spending time with Jesus and his disciples. Jesus commends Abba's skills as a fisherman and gives him parenting advice, telling him that the best teachers show people how to learn. Sheep and Pigeon also befriend a talking Fish.
10	10	"Lonely But Not Alone"	Kelly Vrooman	October 17, 2025
Abby wants to spend the day with her parents Abba and Eema but her father is called to work due to the busy fishing season. Eema is called to a hair emergency involving their neighbor while her best friend Joshua is forced by his older brother to mend shoes. Abby visits her friend Yael who makes up the 11th and 12th commandments before being called to a meal. Abby visits Hilarius Maximus, who is testing helmets for the Roman soldiers. With her family and friends busy, Abby and her animal companions encounter Jesus, who talks about being able to pray to God when alone. Abby shares this lesson with her parents. Abba also builds a rattan hammock for Sheep, who has been lying on his bed. Pigeon teaches Joshua's older brother a lesson.
11	11	"You Herd It Here First, Part 1"	Kellen Erskine and Andrew Simmons	October 17, 2025
Sheep recounts his story as a ram seeking the affection of his shepherd. When the shepherd shears him, Sheep assumes that his shepherd does not love him and decides to escape. After traveling seven hours, Sheep encounters a seemingly hospitable couple but escapes after they attempt to roast him. Sheep encounters two children who dress him with makeup and lock him in a pen. Mistaking their affection for mockery, he escapes but gets caught in a rope trap while attempting to eat a bunch of grapes. Sheep encounters a talking Pigeon, whom he befriends with the promise of plentiful food in Capernaum. Pigeon frees Sheep from the trap.
12	12	"You Herd It Here First, Part 2"	Kellen Erskine	October 17, 2025
After Pigeon frees Sheep, he carries her as they travel to Capernaum. During the journey, Sheep confides in Pigeon about his desire for affection from his shepherd. Due to his recent misadventures, Sheep is bitter towards humans. After traveling through the wilderness, the duo arrive in Capernaum where Pigeon introduces the sheep to her life as a pigeon. Sheep escapes a shepherd seeking to shear him with the help of Pigeon and her friends. When all seems lost, Sheep encounters Abby, who takes pity on him and adopts him and Pigeon as pets. Abby, Joshua and the animals eavesdrop on Jesus, who befriends them and hugs Sheep, giving him the affection he desires.
13	13	"Even the Pigeons"	Kelly Vrooman	October 17, 2025
Abby along with Sheep and Pigeon search for grain in Capernaum's marketplace. Pigeon is injured after Cyrius drops an apple on his wing. With the help of Hilarius, Abby and her friends seek help for Pigeon from a Roman augur. However, the augur is only interested in ravens and refuses to help. When all seems lost, Mary Magdalene wraps Pigeon's broken wing and helps Abby find grain. Sheep gives Cyrius, who has been terrorizing the vendors, a taste of his own medicine by tripping him.
14	14	"Seeking Signs"	Kelly Erskine	October 17, 2025
After learning from Joshua that Jesus has healed a leper, Abby grows frustrated that Jesus has not shown her a sign. Later, she and Joshua find Jesus, who explains that performing miracles is only part of his ministry. Abby and Joshua also have a reunion with Mary Magdalene, whom Jesus had exorcised earlier. Abby and Joshua later join a crowd gathering outside a house as Jesus prepares to heal a crippled man.

== Production ==
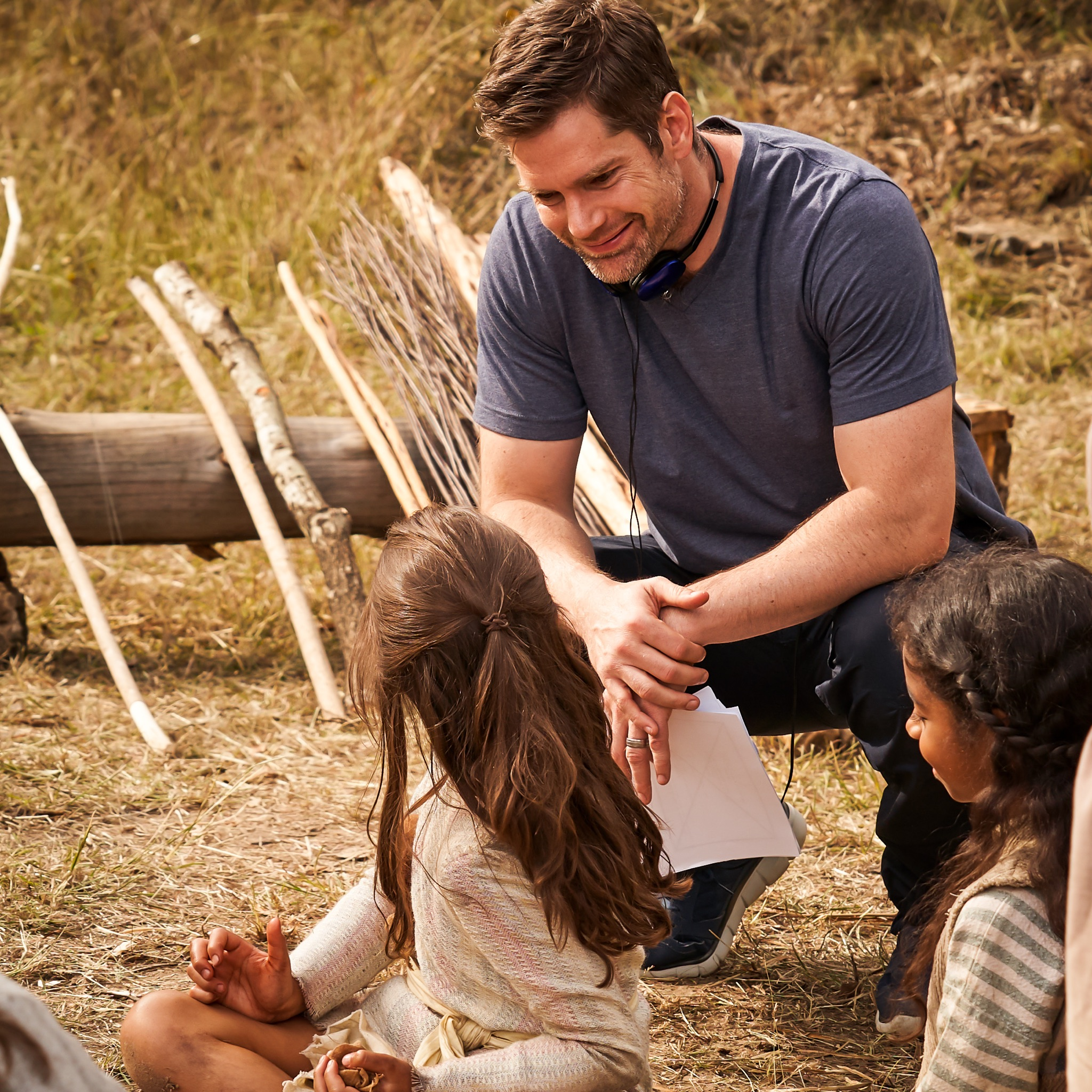
Dallas Jenkins drew inspiration for The Chosen Adventures from "Jesus Loves the Little Children," the third episode of the first season of The Chosen.

=== Development ===
On September 20, 2024 Dallas Jenkins announced that his production company 5&2 Studios was developing several spinoff TV projects set in the universe of The Chosen TV series at the 2024 ChosenCon (The Chosen Insiders Conference) fan convention in Orlando. These TV projects included The Chosen Adventures, a children's animated comedy television series featuring two young children from Capernaum named Abby and Joshua, who encounter Jesus and His disciples.

During an interview with the Catholic News Agency, Jenkins said that the inspiration for The Chosen Adventures came from Jesus interacting with several children including Abigail and Joshua in "Jesus Loves the Little Children," the third episode of the first season of The Chosen. Due to favorable reception from both adult and children viewers, Jenkins decided to create an animated television series featuring the two characters, stating that "it [would] really allow us to explore a whimsy and a playfulness that you can really dig into with animation in a fresh way." Jenkins also said that the show sought to appeal to both children and adult viewers by "grounding it in The Chosen way." Jenkins said that the animated series' aim was to promote the Gospel message and foster curiosity about Jesus among children by blending "humor, heart and spiritual truth." He added that the series sought to portray Jesus as "real, relatable, and life-changing." Jenkins also said that the series strove to remain faithful to the Scriptures while incorporating colorful animation and comedic elements like talking animals.

The series was co-produced by 5&2 Studios and Amazon MGM Studios. Jenkins served as executive producer while Ryan Swanson served as writer, executive producer, and showrunner. Other executive producers included Chris Juen, Chad Gundersen, Keith Alcorn, Kellen Erskine, and Derral Eves. The series was produced by Erin Elizabeth Gardner and co-produced by Myesha Gosselin.

=== Casting ===
In mid-September 2024, Deadline announced that the voice case members would include Paul Walter Hauser, Yvonne Orji, and Jordin Sparks, along with several Chosen cast members including Jonathan Roumie, Paras Patel, Elizabeth Tabish, Noah James, Joey Vahedi, Yasmine Al-Bustami, Brandon Potter and George H. Xanthis. In September 2025, Hauser was named as Sheep, Orji as Pigeon, Romy Fay as Abby, Jude Zarzaur as Joshua, Danny Nuci as Abba, and Zehra Fazal as Eema. Sparks was later cast as the character Fish.

Sparks said that she was drawn to the project by its mix of humor and faith, stating that "I love anytime I can connect what I do for a living—acting, humor—with something that infuses the world with a little more Jesus..."

=== Filming ===
The series currently consists of 14 11-minute episodes.

== Release ==
In February 2025, 5&2 Studios entered into a wide-ranging deal with Amazon MGM Studios that would give Amazon Prime Video exclusive distribution rights for The Chosen Adventures and other future film projects set in The Chosen universe including The Chosen in the Wild with Bear Grylls and Joseph of Egypt. The series premiered exclusively on Prime Video on October 17, 2025 in the United States, United Kingdom, Latin America, Canada, Australia, New Zealand and sub-Saharan Africa. On October 31, the Christian streaming company Minno was granted distribution rights to the series.

== Reception ==
Kate Lucky of Christianity Today gave the series a mixed review. She praised the first season's fidelity to the Bible, the colorful animation and the incorporation of slapstick humor and comedy through the talking Sheep and Pigeon characters. Lucky was critical of the voice cast's Israeli accents, the cameo appearances of Chosen cast members without proper context and argued that the series could have used a narrator to provide context to the series' Biblical historical and cultural context. Lucky however also praised the series as an opportunity for parents to address their children's questions about the Bible and Christian faith.

Joseph Holmes of Religion Unplugged gave the series a mixed review, describing it as a family-friendly children's version of The Chosen and comparing it with other Christian children's animation like VeggieTales and The King of Kings. He criticized the short 12-minute timeframe of the episodes, the formulaic story structure, and opined that its PG rating would limit its target audience. Holmes however praised the quality of the series' animation style and the comic-relief humor provided by the characters of Sheep and Pigeon. He described the series as a standout in both faith-based animation and Christian children content in an increasingly saturated faith-based entertainment market.

Maddy Casale of Decider gave the series a mixed review. She praised Hauser and Orji's performances as the characters Sheep and Pigeon for providing comic relief that would appeal to both children and adults. However, she opined that the series and its characters lacked enough originality, depth and entertainment to appeal to its target audience of pre-teen children. Casale wrote that the series would have better appeal to religiously-minded adults due to its incorporation of Jesus's teachings, historical references and one-liner jokes.

The series debuted in the Top 10 streaming shows on Amazon Prime Video.

=== Awards and nominations ===
Year	Organization	Award	Result	Ref(s)
2026	Movieguide Awards	Epiphany Prize (Episodes 1.1-1.6)	Nominated	
2026	Movieguide Awards	Best Streaming for Children	Nominated	
