= The Chosen (TV series) =

American television series

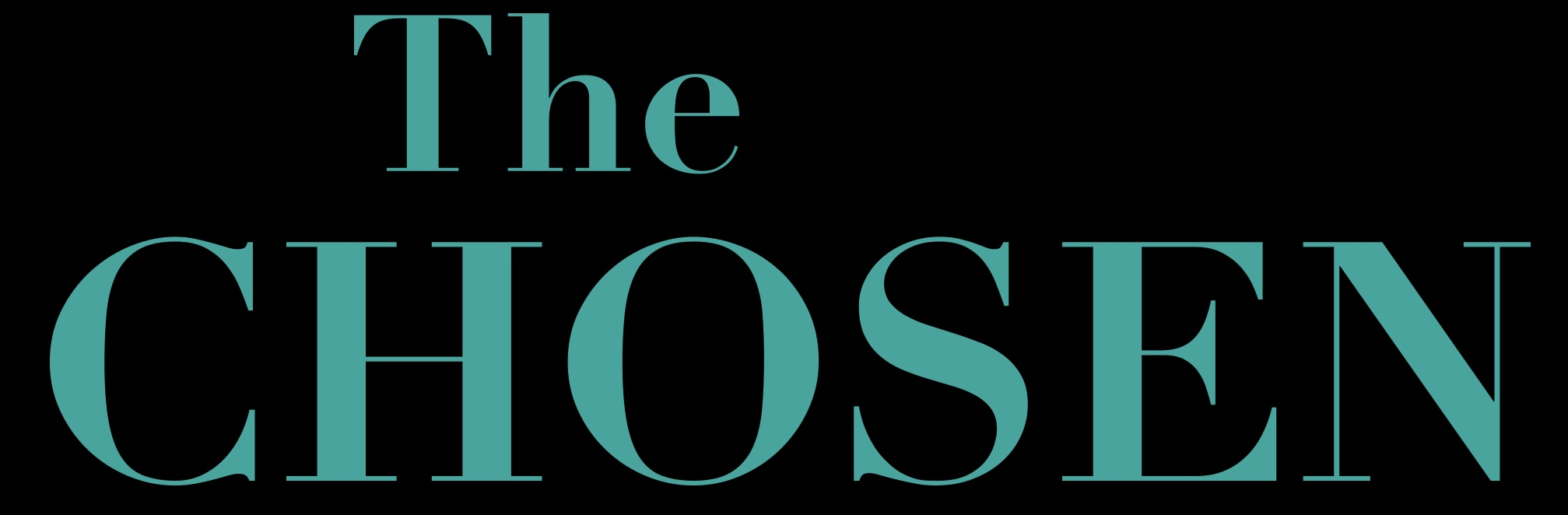
- Genre: Historical drama
- Created by: Dallas Jenkins
- Written by: Dallas Jenkins; Tyler Thompson; Ryan Swanson
- Directed by: Dallas Jenkins
- Starring: Shahar Isaac; Jonathan Roumie; Elizabeth Tabish; Paras Patel; Noah James; George H. Xanthis
- Music by: Matthew S. Nelson; Dan Haseltine
- Country of origin: United States
- No. of seasons: 6
- No. of episodes: 43 (list of episodes)

Production
- Executive producers: Derral Eves; Dallas Jenkins; Tyler Thompson; Ryan Swanson; Matthew Faraci; Brad Pelo
- Producers: Chad Gundersen; Justin Tolley; Chris Juen
- Cinematography: Akis Konstantakopoulos; Petros Antoniadis
- Editors: John Quinn; Adam Lutge
- Running time: 20–100 minutes
- Production company: 5&2 Studios

Original release
- Network: VidAngel
- Release: April 21 – November 26, 2019
- Network: Angel Studios
- Release: April 4, 2021 – February 7, 2023
- Network: TheChosen.tv (Note: Beginning with the fifth season, episodes are exclusive to Prime Video for 90 days.)
- Release: April 4, 2021 – present
- Network: Amazon Prime Video
- Release: June 15, 2025 – present

The Chosen is an American Christian historical drama television series, created, directed, and co-written by filmmaker Dallas Jenkins. It is the first multi-season series about the life and ministry of Jesus of Nazareth, primarily set in Judaea and Galilee in the first century. The series depicts Jesus's life through the eyes of the people who interacted with him, including the apostles and disciples of Jesus, Jewish religious leaders, Roman government and military officials, and ordinary people. The series stars Jonathan Roumie as Jesus alongside Shahar Isaac, Elizabeth Tabish, Paras Patel, Noah James, and George H. Xanthis, among a large cast of others. Six seasons have been released, with the seventh and final season scheduled to be released in 2028.

The series is free to watch and has used a variety of different business models and distribution methods. The first season was financed through crowdfunding, becoming the most successful crowd-funded TV series in history. Season 1 was released in 2019 on the VidAngel platform with a subscription required, but the producers temporarily made it free to watch in response to the early days of the COVID-19 pandemic. They eventually decided to make all seasons free to watch, though there would be exclusivity windows. Seasons 3 and 4 premiered in movie theaters before being released to various streaming platforms, including Amazon Prime Video, Netflix, Facebook, and YouTube. In 2025, Jenkins announced a deal with Amazon MGM Studios to premiere episodes of Seasons 5, 6, and 7 in theaters, followed by a 90-day exclusivity window on Amazon Prime Video, before being made available for free. As of May 2025, The Chosen grossed over US$120 million in its theatrical releases.

The show has been watched by an estimated 280 million people worldwide, a third of whom are not religious. The response has been generally positive among Christians, though there have been various controversies over aspects of the show. It has won four Gospel Music Association (GMA) Dove Awards, three K-Love Fan Awards, two Epiphany Prize from Movieguide and a Pillar Award from the Museum of the Bible.

The series is internationally distributed by Lionsgate, and translation into other languages is funded by the non-profit Come and See Foundation. The show has been adapted into a series of novels by Jenkins's father Jerry B. Jenkins, a series of graphic novels by Corvus Comics, and companion Bible study materials published by David C. Cook. The success of the series led to the creation of 5&2 Studios which has developed two spin-off series, animated TV series The Chosen Adventures and adventure series The Chosen in the Wild with Bear Grylls.

== Synopsis ==
Set in 1st-century Galilee, the first season chronicles Jesus starting to build a group of disciples and his ministry, inviting people with different backgrounds to study under him. As he performs his first miracles, including turning water into wine in Cana, Jesus calls the former demoniac Mary Magdalene; the stonemason Thaddeus; the choir member Little James; the fishermen Simon, Andrew, Big James, and John; the caterer Thomas; the vintner Ramah; and the tax collector Matthew to follow him. Following Jesus's meeting with the Pharisee Nicodemus, the season culminates with the group traveling through Samaria, where Jesus launches his public ministry after revealing himself to Photina, a Samaritan woman.

Beginning in Samaria, the second season moves into nearby regions such as Syria and Judea, where Jesus continues to build his group of students. As he continues to perform miracles, including healing the paralytic at the Pool of Bethesda, while preparing for a significant sermon, Jesus additionally calls John the Baptizer's disciple Philip, the architect Nathanael, and the Zealot Simon Z. As the word of Jesus spreads throughout the region, he encounters both opportunities and difficulties. The season ends on the preparations for Jesus's Sermon on the Mount with the help of the business apprentice Judas Iscariot.

Returning to Capernaum, the third season portrays the increasing popularity of Jesus, which troubles different societal and political groups, including the Romans and the Pharisees. Following the Sermon on the Mount, Jesus sends his twelve apostles, two by two, to preach and perform miracles without him—their biggest challenge yet. Jesus then returns to his hometown, Nazareth, which results in a shift to his ministry in the year of his greatest popularity. After multiple miraculous occurrences, the season closes in the Decapolis and at the Sea of Galilee, where Jesus feeds thousands with loaves and fishes and then walks on the water.

Starting in Machaerus with the death of John the Baptizer, the fourth season unfolds the last year of the ministry of Jesus as Jesus bears the weight of his mission alone as his adversaries converge on him while his disciples struggle to keep pace with him. As Jesus performs his last miracles, such as healing a man born blind, and transforms his followers, such as changing Simon's name to Peter, the group leaves Capernaum and journeys to Judea and Perea, where they face violent opposition to Jesus's message, including the death of Ramah. When the Jewish religious leaders side with the Roman authorities following Jesus's last sign of raising Lazarus from the dead, the season concludes with Jesus making his way to Jerusalem.

Entering Jerusalem, the fifth season sets out the first five days of the final week of Jesus's ministry as the people of Israel receive him as their king and his disciples expect his reign. During the Passover week, he cleanses the Temple rather than overthrowing Rome. Fearing Jesus's influence, the religious authorities, including Joseph Ben Caiaphas, and the political rulers, including Pontius Pilate, handle it differently. After his final public sermon and farewell discourses, Jesus initiates his Last Supper with the Twelve Apostles in the Upper Room. Once the group heads to the Garden of Gethsemane, the season wraps up with an upset Judas Iscariot betraying Jesus.

== Main cast ==
- Shahar Isaac as Simon Peter
- Jonathan Roumie as Jesus
- Elizabeth Tabish as Mary Magdalene
- Paras Patel as Matthew the Apostle
- Noah James as Andrew
- Janis Dardaris as Zohara (season 1; guest season 5)
- Lara Silva as Eden (seasons 1 and 3–5; guest season 2)
- Shaan Sharma as Shmuel
- Nick Shakoour as Zebedee
- George H. Xanthis as John the Apostle
- Shayan Sobhian as Big James (season 1, episodes 1–4)
- Erick Avari as Nicodemus (seasons 1 and 5)
- Kian Kavousi as Big James (season 1, episodes 5–8)
- Brandon Potter as Quintus Benedictus Dio (seasons 1 and 3–4; recurring season 2)
- Kirk B. R. Woller as Gaius (seasons 1 and 3–5; recurring season 2)
- Giavani Cairo as Thaddeus
- Jordan Walker Ross as Little James
- Abe Bueno-Jallad (Note: Noted as "Abe Martell" at the commencement of Season 2.) as Big James (seasons 2–6)
- Joey Vahedi as Thomas (seasons 2–6; guest season 1)
- Yasmine Al-Bustami as Ramah (seasons 2–4; guest seasons 1 and 5)
- Vanessa Benavente as Mary of Nazareth (seasons 2–6; guest season 1)
- Yoshi Barrigas as Philip (seasons 2–3)
- Austin Reed Alleman as Nathanael (seasons 2–5)
- Alaa Safi as Simon Z. (seasons 2–6)
- Luke Dimyan as Judas Iscariot (seasons 3–6; guest season 2)
- Ivan Jasso as Yussif (seasons 3–6; recurring seasons 1–2)
- Amber Shana Williams as Tamar (seasons 3–5; recurring season 2; guest season 1)
- Elijah Alexander as Atticus Aemilius Pulcher (seasons 3–5; recurring season 2)
- Reza Diako as Philip (seasons 4–5)

== Episodes ==
Season	Episodes	Originally released		
Season	Episodes	First released	Last released	Network
Pilot		December 24, 2017		Facebook
1	8	April 21, 2019	November 26, 2019	VidAngel
2	8	April 4, 2021	July 11, 2021	Angel Studios; TheChosen.tv
Christmas Special		December 1, 2021		Angel Studios; TheChosen.tv
3	8	December 11, 2022 (Note: Episodes 1 & 2 of season 3 were released for an early limited theatrical run on November 18, 2022.)	February 7, 2023 (Note: Episodes 7 & 8 of season 3 were released for an early limited theatrical run on February 2, 2023.)	Angel Studios; TheChosen.tv
4	8	June 2, 2024 (Note: All episodes of season 4 were released in theaters prior to release for streaming: episodes 1–3 on February 1, 2024, episodes 4–6 on February 15, 2024, and episodes 7–8 on February 29, 2024.)	June 30, 2024	TheChosen.tv
5	8	June 15, 2025 (Note: All episodes of season 5 were released in theaters prior to release for streaming: episodes 1–2 on March 27, 2025, episodes 3–5 on April 3, 2025, and episodes 6–8 on April 10, 2025.)	June 29, 2025	TheChosen.tv (Note: Beginning with the fifth season, episodes are exclusive to Prime Video for 90 days before being made available on the website.); Amazon Prime Video
6	6	November 15, 2026 (Note: The first three episodes of season 6 were released on Amazon Prime Video on November 15, 2026, episode 4 on November 22, 2026, episode 5 on November 29, 2026, and episode 6 on December 6, 2026.)	December 6, 2026	TheChosen.tv; Amazon Prime Video

== Background and production ==
=== Development ===
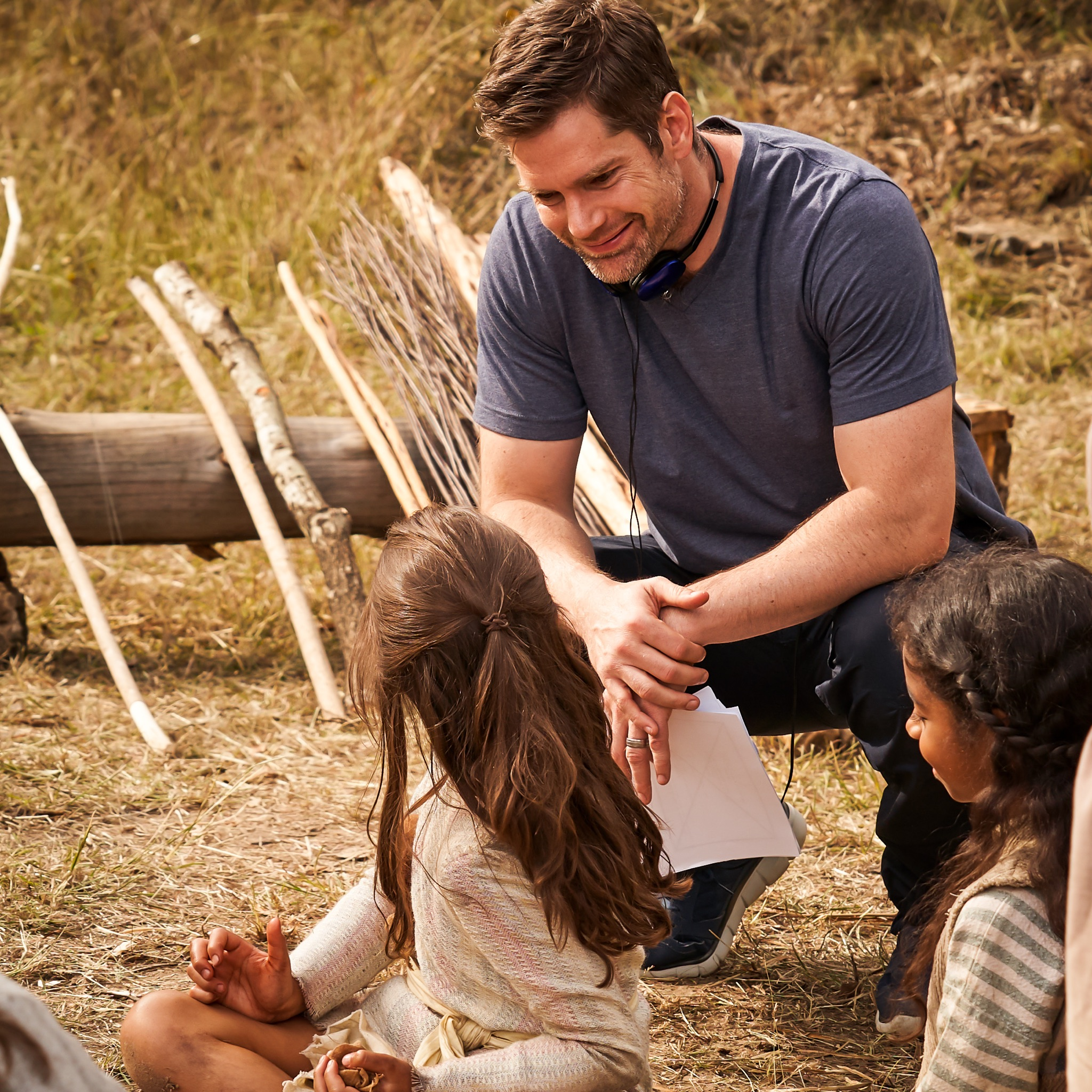
Dallas Jenkins directs episode 3, season 1 of The Chosen

In 2017, working through his production company, Vertical Church Films, Dallas Jenkins released a feature-length film, The Resurrection of Gavin Stone; the film did not perform to the studio's expectations at the box office. While working to determine his next project, Jenkins began binge-watching different television shows and realized there had never been a multi-season show about Jesus that could be watched in the same way.

Jenkins returned to a script for a short film called The Shepherd. Filmed on a friend's farm in Marengo, Illinois, Jenkins wrote the screenplay and intended the film be shown during a Christmas Eve service at his church, Harvest Bible Chapel in Elgin, Illinois. Expanding on that idea, he came up with the concept for The Chosen as a multi-season story arc about the life of Jesus that could build a backstory based on cultural and historical context. This allowed him to focus more on the people who encountered and followed Jesus, viewing him through their eyes and thus presenting Jesus in a way that was more "personal, intimate, [and] immediate".

Faith-based video streaming service VidAngel became aware of The Shepherd and showed interest in expanding on the concept of a Jesus-based series. At the time, VidAngel was involved in a lawsuit with major Hollywood studios and thus seeking original content to distribute. They suggested putting the short film on Facebook as a series pilot to see if interest would be generated for a multi-season show. Jenkins expressed that he was not totally on board with the potential of crowdfunding, but decided to give the platform a try. The short film received over 15 million views around the world.

VidAngel, along with Jenkins and video marketing strategist Derral Eves, turned to the crowdfunding business model to produce The Chosen. A provision in the JOBS Act that went into effect in 2016 allowed them to offer shares of ownership and profits from the production rather than the arbitrary perks offered by regular crowdfunding. The first fundraising round raised $11 million from more than 16,000 investors for the project, each of whom received equity in the project. This surpassed Mystery Science Theater 3000 as the top crowdfunded TV series project. Their equity stake allows them to share in profits not only from the show itself but also from other revenue sources, such as merchandise, books, and Bible-study materials. Majority shareholders will not receive a share of the profits until the original investors earn 120% of their investments.

After funding the first season by selling equity, the show has utilized traditional crowdfunding for subsequent seasons, along with a model that offers more traditional crowdfunding perks, such as appearing as an extra in the film. Season 2 fundraising had raised over $6 million from more than 300,000 contributors as of July 1, 2020. As with previous seasons, the producers continue to use the pay-it-forward model developed by Angel Studios to help fund the development of the show's future seasons. Through 2021, the average contribution through crowdfunding efforts was $65.

In October 2022, the creators partnered with a new nonprofit, the Come and See Foundation, which was created to manage the show's funding. The nonprofit status allows contributors to receive a tax deduction for their donations. In March 2024, Jenkins announced a delay in the streaming release of season 4 for legal reasons stemming from a dispute between The Chosen, LLC and Angel Studios, noting that the production costs of the series were proving the previous method of crowdfunding to be unsustainable.

The show also raises revenue through licensing to other streaming platforms and TV networks, video and merchandise sales, and limited premiere runs in movie theaters.

Seven seasons of the series are planned. In 2023, former DreamWorks executive Mark Sourian was hired to lead development of an entertainment universe with future films and shows based on the original series.

=== Script ===
In contrast with typical Bible-focused productions, Jenkins has given more depth to his scripts by adding backstories to various characters from the gospels without contradicting material that is present. This is noted in the opening credits of the first episode, which include the following:

The Chosen is based on the true stories of the gospels of Jesus Christ. Some locations and timelines have been combined or condensed. Backstories and some characters or dialogue have been added. However, all biblical and historical context and any artistic imagination are designed to support the truth and intention of the Scriptures. Viewers are encouraged to read the gospels. The original names, locations and phrases have been translated into English for anything spoken.

Although the show has an evangelical tendency, there are consultants from three Christian faith traditions providing input. Acting as consultants are Messianic rabbi Jason Sobel from Fusion Global Ministries; Catholic priest and national director of Family Theater Productions Father David Guffey; and professor of New Testament at Biola University Dr. Doug Huffman. They review scripts and provide facts or context on the biblical, cultural, and socio-political history of the storyline. Orthodox Jewish theologian David Nekrutman was appointed as adviser for the show's fourth season.

Jenkins said he draws creative inspiration from shows like Friday Night Lights and The Wire, and writers Ryan Swanson and Tyler Thompson list The Wire, Game of Thrones, Battlestar Galactica, and Star Trek as their influences.

=== Casting ===
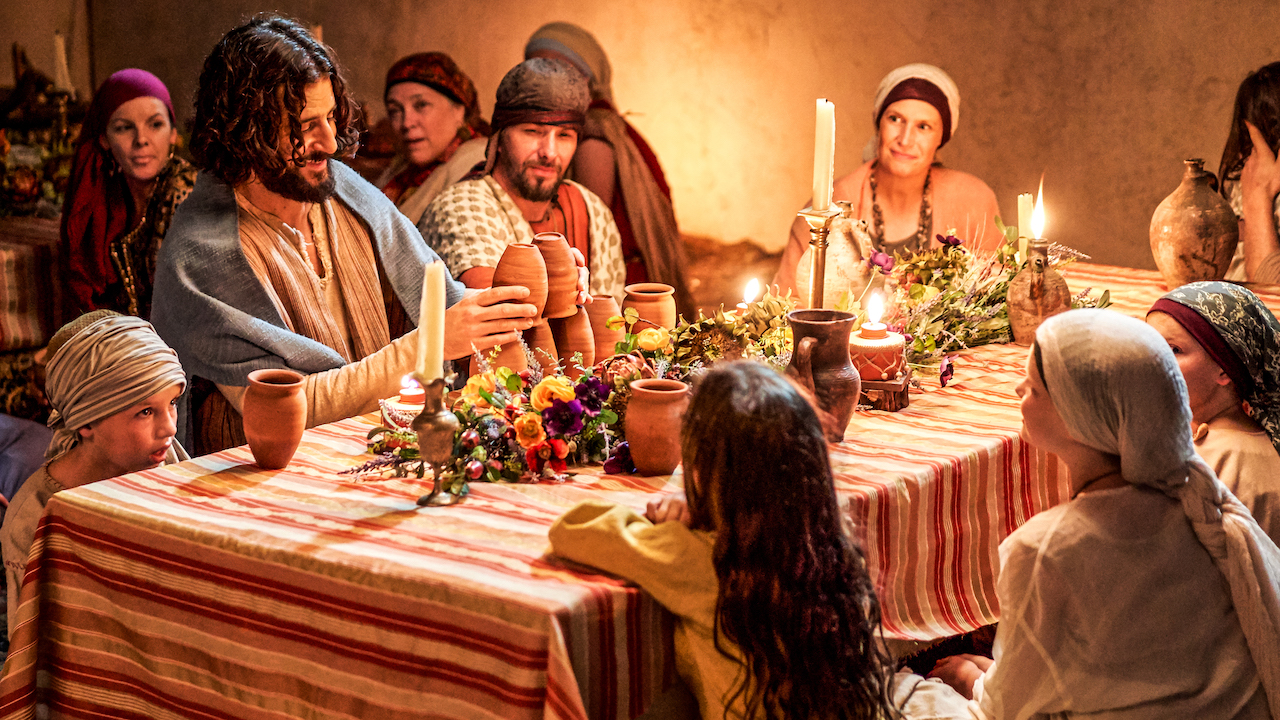
Jesus (Jonathan Roumie) in episode 5 of The Chosen

The show features many people of color as actors, which is not often the case in television shows and films based on the Bible. Jenkins avoided "big stars" and "white people", trying instead to re-create a picture of first-century Capernaum—which, being on a trade route, would have reflected a diversity of ethnicities and backgrounds.

Various members of the cast have described a deep connection to the show, the story, and their character. Elizabeth Tabish, who was considering leaving her acting career, described it as a "dream role". Jonathan Roumie said he always aims to "empty out as much of himself as possible" to allow the Holy Spirit to work in him through both the script and his performance onscreen. In describing his preparation for the role, Roumie said that he does "a good bit of reading and rereading the source material" but that most of the preparation is "in the spiritual department".

=== Filming ===
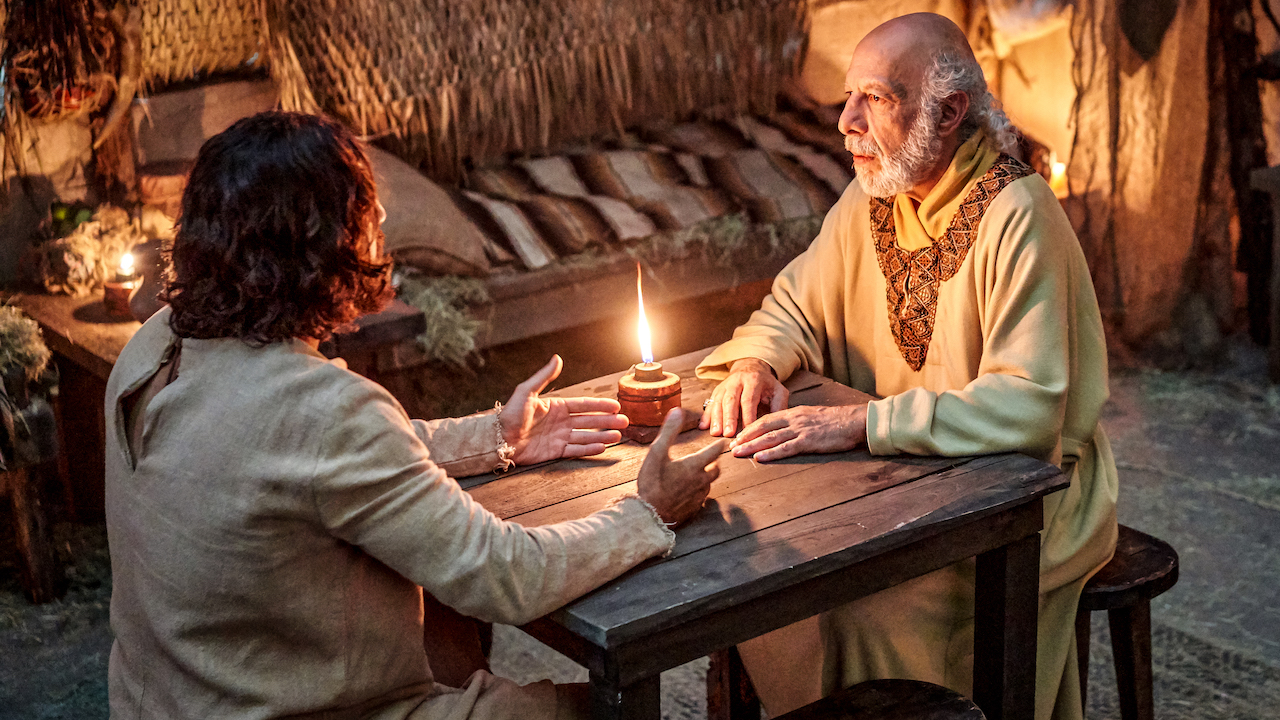
Jesus and Nicodemus

Season 1 was filmed over 60 days mostly around Poolville and Weatherford, Texas, supplemented by a sound stage and visual effects in a Dallas studio. After searching online for suitable locations, the producers settled on the existing Capernaum Village in Pooleville, a venue that offers both film set rental and live experiences for tourists.

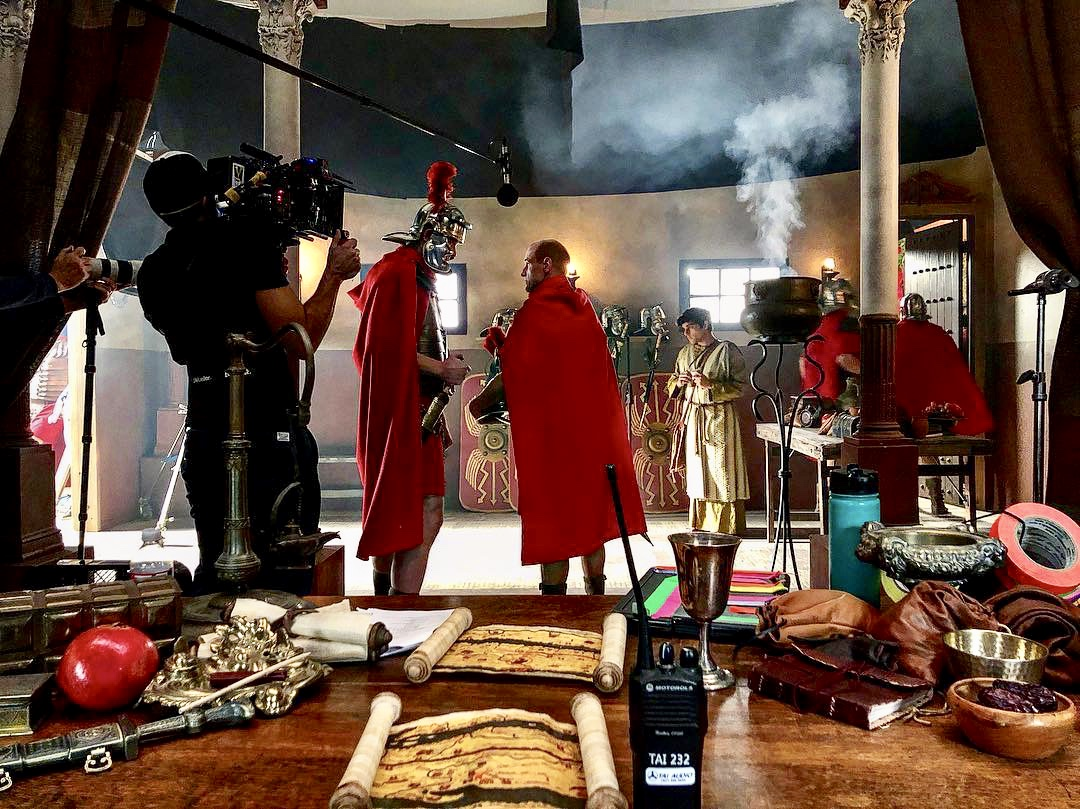
Behind the scenes of the Roman Authority set of The Chosen

Season 2 moved filming to Utah County, Utah, to a replica Jerusalem movie set built by The Church of Jesus Christ of Latter-day Saints (LDS Church). The set was originally built to authentically replicate most of the primary locations of the ancient city in order to film scenes for the LDS Church's Bible and Book of Mormon videos. As part of the LDS Motion Picture Studios South Campus, the set's use by The Chosen marks the first time a production not affiliated with the LDS Church has been allowed to film there. Filming occurred during October and November 2020. Commenting on how much the Utah desert resembles the Holy Land, Dallas Jenkins said that they could not re-create it anywhere else—"you can't even get this in Israel".

Being filmed during the COVID-19 pandemic created challenges for the production of season 2. Two thousand extras were used in filming the Sermon on the Mount scene, all of whom were required to obtain a negative PCR test result prior to filming. Safety precautions such as multiple testing and proper personal protective equipment (PPE) kits for the cast and crew members were also applied. Following COVID-19 protocols increased the production costs by $750,000. Anyone arriving on set had to be tested in advance and upon arrival, longer meal breaks were required, and all hair and makeup stations had to be sanitized regularly. Jenkins indicated that the production experienced fewer than five positive COVID-19 cases during filming.

Production of season 3 moved filming back to Texas, to a site in Midlothian, selected for its similarities with the Middle East in both topography and weather. There, The Chosen partnered with the National Christian Foundation and the Impact Foundation to construct a $20 million production complex on the site of the Salvation Army's Camp Hoblitzelle. When completed, the complex will include a soundstage, set workshops, and a replica of Capernaum. The Chosen will lease the facility, which will ultimately be used for other film and television projects. Beginning in April 2022, filming for season 3 included a four-day shoot for the scene of the feeding of the 5,000, using nearly 12,000 extras from 36 countries. Most of the extras came at their own expense and made their own costumes.

Season 4 production began in March 2023 in Midlothian. When the series had to stop filming at the beginning of the 2023 Screen Actors Guild – American Federation of Television and Radio Artists (SAG-AFTRA) strike on July 14, 2023, fans started a prayer campaign through social media. The series was granted a waiver to continue filming on July 16, 2023. Under the terms of the waiver, the show's producers agreed to be bound to the terms of the collective bargaining agreement retroactively.

Filming of season 5 began on April 11, 2024, in Utah with production completing at the show's facility in Midlothian, Texas.

Jenkins announced that season 6 began filming on April 14, 2025. The season included filming in Goshen, Utah. The crucifixion scenes were shot in Matera, Italy. Filming concluded in September 2025. The seventh and final season began filming on April 27, 2026, and was completed September 2026. It will premiere in 2028.

=== Music ===
To compose the music for the series, creator Dallas Jenkins called on a longtime friend, Jars of Clay vocalist and songwriter Dan Haseltine. Haseltine had worked on projects with Jenkins in the past, composing the music for Hometown Legend. Initially, Haseltine was not interested, believing that there were plenty of similar projects and that the world didn't need another "cheesy Jesus story". After Jenkins convinced him that The Chosen would be different, Haseltine brought in fellow Jars of Clay multi-instrumentalist Matthew S. Nelson to assist with composition. Haseltine has noted that musical influences include Middle Eastern, Indian drone, Delta blues, and "slave spirituals".

== Themes ==
Executive producer Dallas Jenkins wanted to produce a multi-season series about Jesus that viewers could binge watch. Hoping to distinguish the series from previous portrayals of Jesus, Jenkins wanted to "encounter Jesus through the eyes of those who actually met Him", presenting a story that would be more "personal, intimate, [and] immediate".

The show gives backstories to both the characters and the settings. For instance, there are storylines that explore vice, addiction, autism, and physical disability. In The New York Times, Ruth Graham points out that themes within the storylines include "complex relationships, suspense, political intrigue, and charged emotional moments". Other themes, described by Chris DeVille in The Atlantic, include marital conflict and financial struggles. Writing for Vox, Aja Romano points out there is an underlying theme of racial tension as shown in the relationship between Jews and Samaritans of the time.

Actor Jordan Walker Ross, who plays Little James, has scoliosis and minor cerebral palsy, causing him to walk with a limp, a disability that he was asked to hide in previous acting jobs. Rather than hide it, Jenkins has used Ross's physical disability to explore story themes in which Jesus heals some people but not others.

Jenkins also highlights that there were key moments in which women were intentionally chosen by Jesus to be a vital part of his ministry.

== Release and distribution ==
The show used a variety of different release and distribution models as viewership has grown. The first season was originally released on VidAngel's subscription service and was also available for DVD purchase. Initially, viewership was sluggish. Then, during the COVID-19 pandemic in March and April 2020, the first season was made freely available through The Chosen app, and viewership spiked. Jenkins stated that revenue actually went up after they made it free to watch, attributing it to "God's impossible math". The producers have since made the free-to-watch model permanent, and generate revenue through a variety of channels including theatrical releases, streaming platform and television network deals, merchandise and media sales, and pay-it-forward viewer contributions.

Seasons 1–4 were primarily distributed via The Chosen's app and website before being released to other platforms. New episodes were typically premiered via livestream on YouTube and Facebook, and then released on the app and website. The app includes bonus content, such as Bible round-tables and exclusive "after-show" content, as well as an opportunity for viewers to make tax-deductible contributions to fund production. Beginning with Season 5, new seasons will be initially exclusive to Amazon Prime Video before being made available for free.

=== Season 1 ===
By early 2021, the show was made available to view on Amazon Prime Video, Trinity Broadcasting Network, Peacock, and UPtv. In 2022, season 1 was released on Netflix.

=== Season 2 ===
Season 2 was first released in 2021 on The Chosen app and the Angel Studios app and expanded to various other free and paid streaming platforms.

The producers partnered with Fathom Events for a Christmas special titled Christmas with The Chosen: The Messengers, which opened in 1,700 theaters on December 1, 2021. The special also featured performances from Contemporary Christian music artists including Phil Wickham, Maverick City Music, For King and Country, and Brandon Lake. It grossed $13.5 million with one million tickets sold, exceeding previous records for Fathom Events. The effort was to satisfy demand from fans as well as an attempt to drive people back to movie theaters.

=== Season 3 ===
After the success in theaters of the Christmas special, the producers announced the first two episodes of Season 3 would be shown in theaters before being released for free on various platforms. Season 3's first two episodes were released in theaters prior to streaming. It screened in more than 2,000 theaters throughout the US, as well as the United Kingdom, Ireland, Canada, Australia and New Zealand.

Jenkins indicated an interest to theatrically release the third season's penultimate and finale episodes as well, noting that the scene of the feeding of the 5,000 is more suited to the big screen. When Jenkins announced ticket sales during a livestream, the resulting demand initially crashed the Fathom Events website. The finale opened in theaters on February 2, 2023.

In June 2023, The CW acquired the first three seasons of The Chosen for linear broadcast in the United States. The CW premiere broadcast was watched by 520,000 viewers.

Another theatrical Christmas special, Christmas with The Chosen: Holy Night, opened in theaters on December 12, 2023. Combining scenes from The Shepherd and The Messengers, the film featured seven musical performances from the previous special. A new performance included in the special was done by Andrea Bocelli and his son, Matteo Bocelli, singing "O Holy Night" in French. The special also featured monologues by Dallas Jenkins's wife, Amanda Jenkins, and co-writer of The Chosen, Tyler Thompson.

=== Season 4 ===
The entirety of the fourth season of The Chosen began its release in domestic theaters the first week of February 2024, with episodes 1–3 playing for two weeks, and episodes 4–6 for two weeks, episodes 7–8 playing for one week.

Following the February 2024 theatrical release of episodes 7 and 8 of season 4, Dallas Jenkins announced via a video statement in March that the streaming release would be delayed due to "legal matters". According to Jenkins, the delay was the result of a breach of contract dispute between Angel Studios and The Chosen, LLC. Jenkins later announced via video livestream on YouTube that legal arbitration had concluded and the first episode of season four would be released through the show's app on June 2, 2024. Jenkins further stated two episodes per week would be released on the app through the month of June on every Sunday and Thursday. Season 4 episodes were later released to other platforms.

In June 2024, the CW picked up the show for its fourth season.

=== Season 5 ===
In February 2025, Jenkins announced a deal with Amazon MGM Studios to distribute theatrical releases of season 5, branded The Chosen: Last Supper, beginning in March 2025. As part of the deal, Amazon acquired exclusive rights to stream season 5 on Amazon Prime Video for 90 days, after which the show will be made available for free. Season 5 would be released on Amazon Prime on June 15, 2025.

The Season 5 trailer soared to No. 1 on YouTube's trending list and amassed more than 1 million views in less than 24 hours. The film grossed $11.49M on its opening weekend, surpassing the third season's theatrical release, where it grossed $8.77M during its opening weekend in November 2022. After the release of Part 3 of the fifth season, the entire theatrical run of The Chosen series grossed over $120 million. The three parts of Last Supper became the highest-grossing film released by Fathom Events, with the first part alone grossing nearly $20.2 million domestically but was surpassed in 2026.

=== Season 6 ===
Season 6 consists of six episodes, with the first three episodes being released on Amazon Prime Video on November 15, 2026. The remaining three episodes will be released on a weekly basis until December 6. The season finale will be a released in theatres on March 12, 2027. Season 6 covers the 24 hours of Good Friday, culminating in the crucifixion of Jesus Christ.

=== International distribution ===
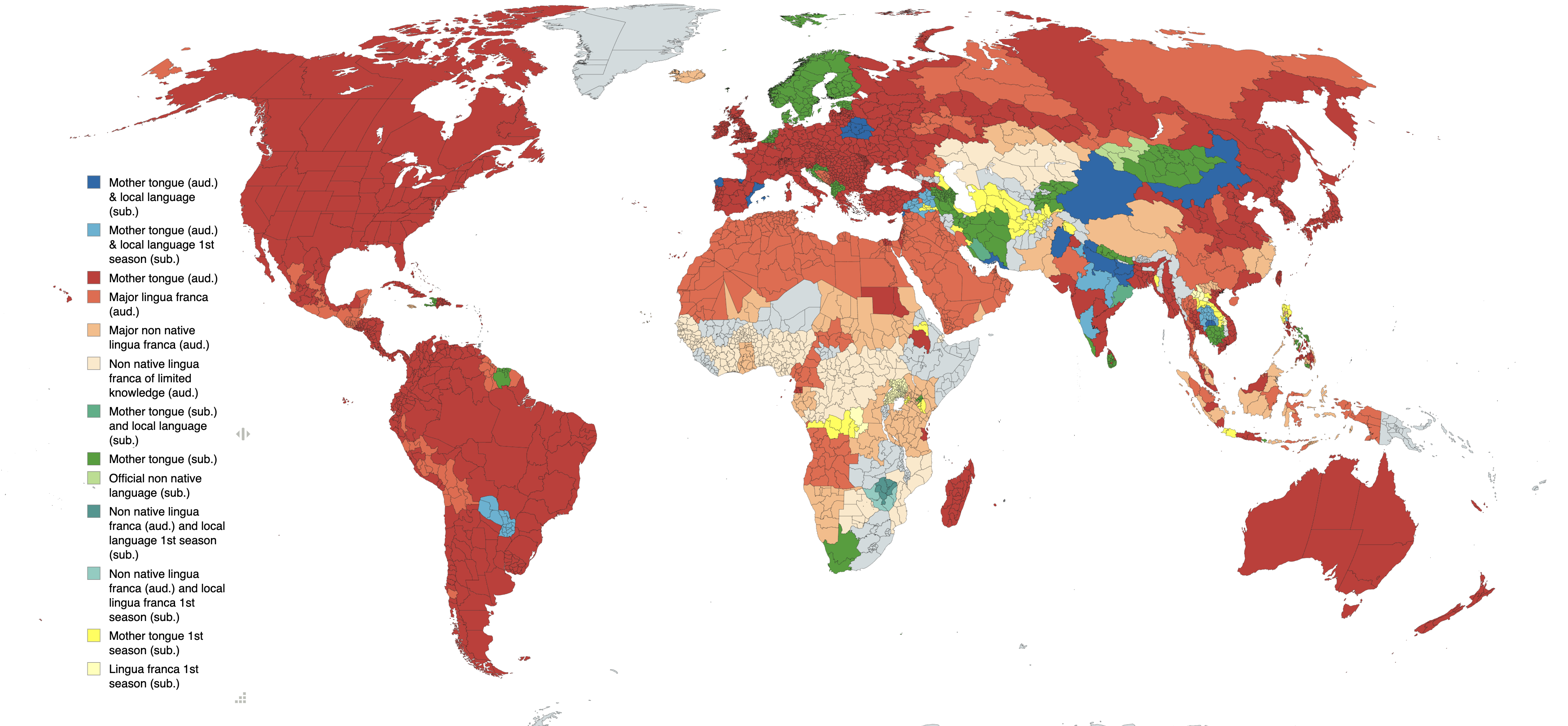
Language accessibility of "The Chosen" series. (February 2026)

The producers have stated a desire for The Chosen to be seen by over one billion people and broadcast in every country in the world. In October 2022, the Come and See Foundation was formed as a nonprofit to help fund the translation and global distribution of the series. With no budget, the foundation began by operating on funding from an anonymous donor. The foundation's goal is dubbing the show in 100 languages and subtitling it in 600 languages. As of January 2024, the series has been dubbed in nearly 50 languages.

In May 2023, Lionsgate Television acquired worldwide distribution rights to the series under a sub-license. Under the agreement, the series remained an Angel Studios original and Angel retains exclusive launch windows and licensing rights to the show.

The series has expanded to international platforms, such as Canal+ in France. The first season was broadcast on the Croatian Radio Television during the last week of Advent in 2022. As of 2023, the series had also launched into the Netherlands on NPO, Spain on Movistar, and Poland on TVP. In the summer of 2023, The Chosen became the first television show to be translated into Malagasy. The first three seasons of The Chosen were first aired in the Philippines on GMA, during Holy Week in 2025, and have been re-aired on its subsidiary GTV every Sunday evening since August 3, 2025.

=== Box office performance ===
Film	U.S. release date	Box office gross
Christmas with the Chosen: The Messengers	December 1, 2021	$13,728,000
The Chosen Season 3: Episodes 1 & 2	November 18, 2022	$14,679,613
The Chosen Season 3 Finale (Note: Release of episodes 7–8 of season 3.)	February 2, 2023	$5,589,142
Christmas with the Chosen: Holy Night (Note: Re-release of Christmas with the Chosen: The Messengers along with the short film The Shepherd and new concert footage.)	December 15, 2023	$4,676,000
The Chosen Season 4: Episodes 1–3	February 1, 2024	$14,873,918
The Chosen Season 4: Episodes 4–6	February 15, 2024	$9,482,744
The Chosen Season 4: Episodes 7–8	February 29, 2024	$7,768,191
The Chosen Last Supper: Part 1 (Note: Release of episodes 1–2 of season 5.)	March 27, 2025	$25,064,897
The Chosen Last Supper: Part 2 (Note: Release of episodes 3–5 of season 5.)	April 4, 2025	$12,536,179
The Chosen Last Supper: Part 3 (Note: Release of episodes 6–8 of season 5.)	April 11, 2025	$12,456,592
Total		$120,855,276

== Reception ==
=== Viewership ===
The show's popularity began largely as an underground phenomenon, going unnoticed and unreviewed by major publications. Until it was added to Peacock in 2021, The Chosen was not available on any major cable network or streaming service, yet it was still able to achieve more than 312 million streaming views in that time. In November 2022, an independent consultant hired by the producers estimated that over 108 million people globally had watched at least part of one episode of The Chosen. According to the Atlanta Journal-Constitution, the show had 200 million viewers and 770 million episode views as of January 2024. As of 2025, producers estimated it has been seen by 280 million people worldwide, a third of whom are not religious.

The Chosen has performed strongly on streaming platforms. On Prime Video, the show reached the no. 1 position in the US following the season 5 debut and has remained in the platform's top 10 rankings through 2025. The show has also found success on Netflix, where it appeared in the top 10 rankings in several countries including Brazil, Honduras, and Paraguay.

=== Critical response ===
The show has received positive reviews for its acting, direction, speculative storytelling beyond typical Bible stories, and authenticity. Covering the release of season 4 for the Atlanta Journal-Constitution, Patricia Holbrook wrote that the authenticity of the series "has made [her] realize how little [she] ever thought about the humanity of Jesus" and that "the series expands on known struggles that the disciples and other characters had, making us realize the impact of Jesus' presence and teaching on those who followed him". Other Christian commentators have also praised the series for its production value, noting that it raises the bar for other faith-based productions. The Atlantic's Chris DeVille noted that its success so far has arrived "not in spite of its insularity, but because of it", concluding that "for the most part, the series seems to be finding its fans among the converted". However, Texas Monthly suggested that the show has the most mainstream crossover potential since Touched by an Angel.

Not all reception has been positive. The creators have received an array of criticisms, including the production's association with the LDS Church and accusations of injecting Mormon theology into the scripts. Dallas Jenkins has refuted the claims in interviews and livestreams, stating that The Chosen has no Mormon influence in its writing, scripts, or theology and insists the show is "conservative evangelical". Other criticism has been from pastors and viewers who believe the writers have taken artistic liberty too far with what is and is not written in the Bible, as well as those who say the show violates the second of the Ten Commandments about creating images of God.

=== Awards and accolades ===
Year	Organization	Award	Result	Ref(s)
2020	Movieguide Awards	Epiphany Prize (season 1 episode 8)	Nominated	
2020	Movieguide Awards	Grace Prize (Jonathan Roumie)	Won	
2021	K-Love Fan Awards	Film & Television Impact	Won	
2022	GMA Dove Awards	Inspirational Film of the Year	Won	
2022	Movieguide Awards	Epiphany Prize: Movie (Christmas with The Chosen: The Messengers)	Nominated	
2022	Movieguide Awards	Epiphany Prize: Television (season 2, episode 8)	Nominated	
2022	Movieguide Awards	Grace Prize (Jonathan Roumie)	Nominated	
2022	Museum of the Bible	Pillar Award	Won	
2023	K-Love Fan Awards	Film & Television Impact	Won	
2023	GMA Dove Awards	Television Series of the Year	Won	
2023	Movieguide Awards	Epiphany Prize (season 3, episode 1 & 2)	Won	
2023	Movieguide Awards	Grace Prize (Jonathan Roumie)	Nominated	
2023	Movieguide Awards	Best Television for Families	Nominated	
2025	K-Love Fan Awards	Film Impact	Won	
2025	GMA Dove Awards	Television Series of the Year	Won	
2026	Movieguide Awards	Epiphany Prize for Inspiring Movies (The Chosen Last Supper: Part 2)	Won	
2026	GMA Dove Awards	Television Series of the Year	Won	

== Media information ==
=== Marketing ===
Jenkins and VidAngel initially focused on social media to promote their idea for the show by releasing the short film The Shepherd on Facebook. After the first season of the show was released, they began to utilize their pay-it-forward model to assist with promotion. In addition, Jenkins has built a large following of fans by regularly hosting livestream events and "viewing parties". The production company employs a dedicated social media staff as well as a dedicated video team for "behind-the-scenes" coverage that is used in social media promotion. According to Jenkins, their success is based on direct communication with viewers.

Promotional trailers are also developed to appeal to specific denominations.

In 2022, as part of the producers' Easter marketing campaign, 48 of the 70 billboards for the show nationwide were changed to appear as though they had been defaced or vandalized with phrases like "The Chosen is boring" and "Chosensux.com". The URL directed users to a website called "The Chosen Is Not Good", which depicted Satan as a character trying to get people not to watch the show. As a result of the campaign, many fans of the show were concerned that the defacement was real and, in April, Dallas Jenkins issued an apology to fans for having not mentioned anything about the campaign.

=== Merchandising ===
To complement its crowd-sourced fundraising model, The Chosen generates revenue through merchandise sales including T-shirts, hats, books, and DVDs. In addition to offering general merchandise, The Chosen has partnered with Christian publishers such as David C. Cook and Broadstreet Publishing to produce companion study guides, devotionals, and Bible study materials. The show is also being adapted into a series of graphic novels by Corvus Comics.

Soundtracks for seasons 1, 2 and 3 have been released. Songwriter Dan Haseltine believes there will be additional projects by other artists influenced and inspired by the series.

=== Companion Bible study materials ===
To complement the show's content, Dallas Jenkins, his wife Amanda, and Douglas Huffman have released companion Bible studies that follow the show. Huffman, a professor of New Testament at Biola University, also serves as a consultant to the show. The first study, from David C. Cook publishers, was released January 21, 2021. In addition to a book, the study includes digital resources, video clips, teacher guides, and promotional materials.

=== Books ===
Dallas Jenkins's father, Left Behind author Jerry B. Jenkins, has contributed a novelization of each of the show's seasons. Jenkins has collaborated in the past with his father on Hometown Legend and Midnight Clear, a full-length feature film based on one of his father's short stories.

The elder Jenkins notes that this is atypical: though it is common for TV shows or movies to be based on novels, in this case it is the other way around, with the novel being based on the show in what he refers to as "a backward deconstruction". He notes that the biggest challenge in this approach is adding detail to the story that is not part of the Biblical account.

=== ChosenCon ===
ChosenCon (officially The Chosen Insiders Conference) is a fan convention dedicated to the show. The first ChosenCon was held in Dallas, Texas, in 2023 and gathered around 3,500 attendees. The 2024 edition took place in Orlando, Florida, and reportedly drew more than 5,000 fans. The event featured announcements of spinoffs within the franchise. The next convention was held in February 2026 in Charlotte, North Carolina.

== Franchise ==
As early as November 2023, The Chosen creator Dallas Jenkins expressed interest in expanding the series into a franchise. By September 2024, the filmmaker launched 5&2 Studios to continue working on the seasons of the series, while also producing other Bible-inspired stories. While describing his approach to the projects that were in development, the filmmaker expressed excitement for continuing the franchise using a method of storytelling that is more intimate with the characters rather than focused on the epic. Jenkins attributes the expansion of The Chosen into a franchise to the support of its audience, confirming that he intends to adapt various stories from the Bible.

- The Chosen Adventures: Created and developed by Jenkins the series takes place within the same timeline as The Chosen, from the view of children during the New Testament time period. Describing the series, the filmmaker stated: "...the story of Jesus through the eyes of children in the whimsical format of animation...there’s something there, seeing Jesus through the eyes of kids. We’re not going to expand on that in the mothership show. But what if we took time with that, in an animated show that was witty and fun and that adults could appreciate. We really wanted to get this right." Cast members from the original series reprise their roles in through vocal performance, including Jonathan Roumie as Jesus. The series was released on Amazon Prime Video on October 17, 2025 and Christian streaming service Minno on October 31, 2025.
- Joseph of Egypt: In September 2024, a limited series was announced to be in development set within The Old Testament era of The Holy Bible, portraying the events of the prophet Joseph who was sold by his brothers as a slave into Egypt. Franchise creator Jenkins stated that while he won't serve as writer, he will be involved collaboratively through the creative process, ensuring that the tone and style continues to align with The Chosen. In August 2025, the series was officially greenlit by Amazon Studios, with the cast announced to include: Adam Hashmi as Joseph, Alexander Siddig as Jacob, Iris Bahr as Leah, Moran Atias as Bilhah, Necar Zadegan as Zilpah, Shani Atias as Rachel, Daniel Peera as Reuben, Babak Tafti as Simeon, Siya Maleki as Levi, Amir Malaklou as Judah, Ruben Vernier as Gad, Dakota Shapiro as Asher, and Matisse Ratron-Neal as Issachar. By September of the same year, the official title of the mini-series was announced with Craig Wright serving as showrunner. Wright serves as head writer, while the scripts will receive review and approval from Jenkins, Tyler Thompson, and Ryan Swanson before production.
- Book of Moses: Announced in September 2024, a series set within The Old Testament era of The Holy Bible was in development, which will center around the prophet Moses. Intended to be a three-season series, with each depicting three separate sections of the story. Franchise creator, Dallas Jenkins will serve as showrunner, head writer, director, and executive producer. Describing the premise, Jenkins stated: "Just like how The Chosen asked the question, what would it have been like to meet Jesus and to follow Him or to oppose him, I think the Moses story asks the very same question." The official title of the series was later revealed by the filmmaker.
- The Way of the Chosen: In September 2024, a follow-up series to The Chosen set within The New Testament era of The Holy Bible was announced to be in development, which will center around the Acts of the Apostles after the resurrection and ascension of Jesus Christ. The official title of the show was later announced by Jenkins.

=== Reality television ===
The Chosen in the Wild with Bear Grylls, developed as a companion to the original show, is a six-episode unscripted series featuring challenging wilderness expeditions lead by Bear Grylls, alongside the cast of The Chosen. During the events of each episode, they share personal faith-related stories and reflect on their personal experiences. The series debuted with distribution through Prime Video on August 9, 2026.
