= National Theatre Live: Salomé =

2017 filmed stage play

- Promotional poster for the National Theatre Live broadcast
- Original language: English
- Written by: Yaël Farber
- Based on: The biblical tale of Salome inspired by the play by Oscar Wilde
- Subject: Biblical retelling of the story of Salomé
- Genre: Tragedy; Political drama

Premiere
- Date: June 22, 2017 (United Kingdom)
- Place: Royal National Theatre; Barbican Centre
- Directed by: Yaël Farber

Salomé ([salɔme] marketed as National Theatre Live: Salomé ) is a 2017 filmed stage production by the Royal National Theatre, captured and broadcast as part of the National Theatre Live initiative. The production was written and directed by Yaël Farber and co-directed by Matthew Amos.

First performed at the Olivier Theatre from May 2 to July 15, 2017, the play reimagines the biblical story of Salomé with a modern interpretation, "An occupied desert nation. A radical from the wilderness on hunger strike. A girl whose mysterious dance will change the course of the world." Salomé received positive reviews from critics, grossing $160,738 worldwide.

== Background and release ==
=== First production ===
Salomé was created by South African theatre-maker Yaël Farber, The play was first staged at the Lansburgh Theatre in Washington, D.C., on October 13, 2015. Produced by the Shakespeare Theatre Company for their 2015–16 season that lasted from October 6, 2015, until November 8, 2015. This production was part of the inaugural Women's Voices Theater Festival, a theater festival aimed at showcasing work by women writers and performers. The performance had a cast of twelve people who presented minimalist staging. It took place in the background of the Jerusalem Second Temple with the inclusion of natural elements such as sand and water, together with sets of tables, curtains, and ladders. In her adaptation of the biblical story, director Yaël Farber showed Salome as an empowered, political, and spiritual woman instead of a traditional femme fatale.

Salome was played by Nadine Malouf, while Olwen Fouéré performed the role of the "Nameless Woman" who symbolizes both older Salome and ambiguity regarding the identity of that person. The role of Ioakanaan (John the Baptist) was played by Ramzi Choukair who delivered his dialogue in Arabic language. The main characters were T. Ryder Smith who performed as Pontius Pilate and Ismael Kanater who acted as Herod. The movement direction was performed by Ami Shulman while Mark Bennett designed the original music and sound. Production design and costumes were produced by Susan Hilferty. Donald Holder was in charge of lighting while Robb Hunter was incharge of fighting scenes.

=== Second production ===
In 2017 the second stage play was created by Farber, who wrote and directed the production for the Royal National Theatre. The second production ran at the Olivier Theatre from 2 May 2017 until 15 July 2017 and was later broadcast to cinemas through NT Live on 22 June 2017. Salomé is an reinterpretation of Oscar Wilde’s 1891 play, which portrayed Salomé as a seductive femme fatale. The creative team includes designer Hilferty, lighting designer Tim Lutkin, and composer and sound designer Adam Cork.

== Plot ==
=== First cast ===
- T. Ryder Smith as Pontius Pilate
- Ismael Kanater as Herod
- Ramzi Choukair as Loakanaan (John the Baptist)

=== Second cast ===
- Olwen Fouéré as Nameless Woman, serving as narrator and representing an older Salomé.
  - Isabella Nefar as Salomé, the young, largely silent figure at the centre of the story.
- Ramzi Choukair as Iokanaan (John the Baptist), the imprisoned prophet whose voice inspires Salomé.
- Paul Chahidi as Herod, the unstable ruler and Salomé’s stepfather.
- Raad Rawi as Annas, representing religious authority figures.
- Lloyd Hutchinson as Pontius Pilate, embodying Roman authority in the narrative.
- Philip Arditti as Caiaphas
- Shahar Isaac as Simon bar Giora
- Aidan Kelly as Abaddon
- Yasmin Levy as Woman of Song
- Uriel Emil as Giora
- Andrew Lewis as Ensemble
- Roseanna Frascona as Ensemble
- Theo Lowe as Yeshua

Additional performers included Lubana Al Quntar, billed as the "Women of Song," who provided a vocal accompaniment that contributed to the ritualistic atmosphere of the production.

=== Synopsis ===
In an occupied desert province by the Romans, the king named Herod reigns as a puppet of the Romans with soldiers guarding him in the oppressive city.

The prophet Iokanaan (John the Baptist) is imprisoned in a well beneath the palace, because he speaks out about corruption and inspires an uprising from the people.

Salomé, the king’s daughter-in-law, is attracted to the voice and message of Iokanaan. She is invited to a luxurious banquet at the palace, where she has to perform according to the king’s wishes as Herod becomes more deranged by the moment. Salomé declines but takes the opportunity to take advantage of her new found power and dances passionately for her audience.

Herod is so overwhelmed with pleasure that he asks her to have anything she desires. Her request is the execution of Iokanaan so that she can receive his head. The request scares the king, who fears the prophet’s but complies to save face.

Iokanaan is executed, and his head is presented to Salomé. She accepts it gravely, her act a protest against tyranny. As Herod’s forces close in, Salomé stands alone with the prophet’s head, her choice sparking a wider uprising.

== Reception ==
=== Critical response ===
Upon release, National Theatre Live: Salomé received mixed reviews from critics. Several critics noted that Farber’s Salomé is a revisionist, feminist retelling:The Arts Desk and The Independent stated that she seeks to restore a “lost voice” to a historically sidelined female figure.

In his review for The Guardian, Michael Billington gave the film a 2 out of 4-star rating and the production a negative review, calling it "slow-moving and portentous." He did claim it was visually ambitious and that there was much to enjoy in its design elements, while Yaël Farber's script was "terrible," with florid, archaic language weakening the drama. Billington noted good performances from Olwen Fouéré and Isabella Nefar but concluded that the aesthetic power of the production was undermined by its overwrought text. He also noted that the stage pictures may be impressive, but they are tied to the ball and chain of a terrible text. Also Susannah Clapp of The Guardian criticised the production’s overall approach, describing Yaël Farber’s interpretation as “turgid” and arguing that it “leaves some fine actors stranded in the desert.” She wrote that while the production is filled with images that appear significant, “it is hard to know what anything means,” characterising it as a slow-moving tableau accompanied by ritualistic ululations and wrapped in Susan Hilferty’s “luscious” design.

Dan Rubins of A Younger Theatre observed that despite the director’s political framing of Salomé as a revolutionary, the narrative’s clarity suffers, making her ultimate goal – to reclaim Salomé’s agency – feel under-realized. Dom O'Hanlon of London Theatre, said that Farber’s staging emphasizes ritual and tableau over traditional dramatic narrative, which some critics felt left the play emotionally distant. Rosemary Waugh Exeunt Magazine also offered a delicate critique: although she described the design as “painterly” and ritualistic, and argued that the poetry sometimes “strays into cliché,” and the juxtaposition of historical and modern elements feels awkward. Matt Trueman of Whatsonstage, called the poetry “a sludge” and argued that “great actors [are] wasted,” due to the inaccessible, sing-song structure of the text.

In the Evening Standard, Henry Hitchings wrote that the production is “stylish but slow … the script strains for a poetic profundity that it never achieves.” He praised tableaux moments (such as a “spectral Last Supper”) but argued the political themes of revolution and erasure were undermined by overblown gestures.
