= Between Borders =

- Directed by: Mark Freiburger
- Written by: Mark Freiburger; Isaac Norris; Adam Sjoberg
- Produced by: Ken Carpenter; Mark Freiburger; Ionut Alin Ionescu; Andrei Marinescu; Isaac Norris; Jude S. Walko
- Starring: Elizabeth Tabish; Patrick Sabongui; Elizabeth Mitchell
- Cinematography: Rogier Stoffers
- Edited by: James K. Crouch
- Music by: Hanan Townshend
- Release date: January 26, 2025
- Running time: 88 minutes
- Country: United States
- Language: English

Between Borders is a 2025 American drama film written by Mark Freiburger, Isaac Norris and Adam Sjoberg, directed by Freiburger and starring Elizabeth Tabish, Patrick Sabongui and Elizabeth Mitchell.

== Cast ==
- Elizabeth Tabish as Violetta Petrosyan
- Patrick Sabongui as Ivan Petrosyan
- Elizabeth Mitchell as Carrie Whitlow

== Release ==
The film was released in limited theaters in the United States on January 26, 2025.

== Reception ==
Tara McNamara of Common Sense Media awarded the film three stars out of five.

Carlos Aguilar of Variety gave the film a negative review and wrote that it “suffers from stilted performances and didactic writing.”
