= Stelzner =

Stelzner is a German surname. Notable people with the surname include:

- Alfred Stelzner (1852–1906), German composer and string instrument designer
- Alfred Wilhelm Stelzner (1840–1895), German geologist
- Friedrich Stelzner (1921–2020), German surgeon, scientist, and educator
- Michael Stelzner, American writer
