= Shahar Isaac =

Israeli actor

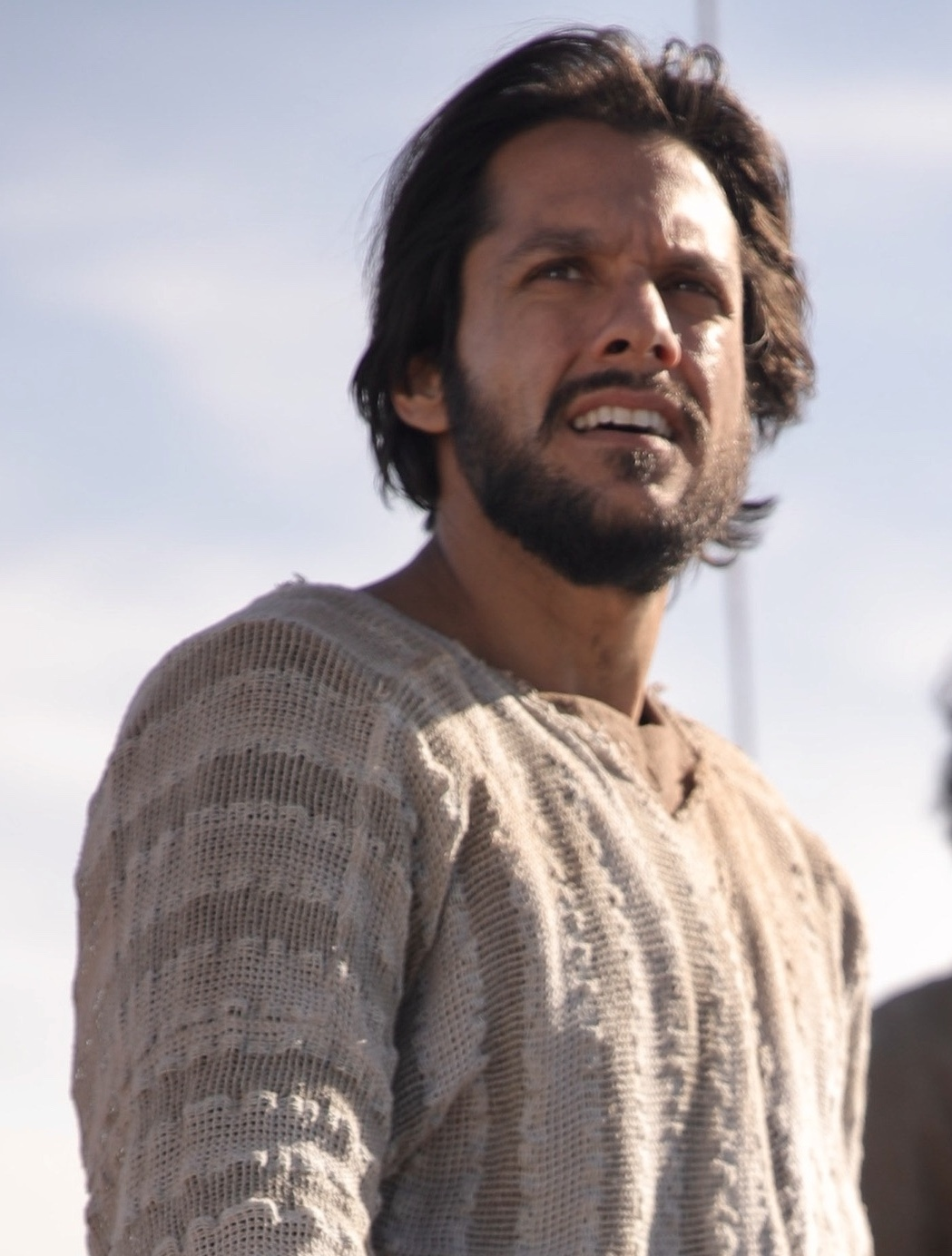
- Shahar Isaac on set
- Born: February 1993 (age 33); Haifa, Israel
- Education: Rutgers University (BFA)
- Occupations: Actor photographer musician
- Years active: 2015–present
- Known for: The Chosen (TV series)

Shahar Isaac (Hebrew: שחר אייזק, Arabic: شاحار إسحاق, born February, 1993) is an Israeli-American actor, photographer, and musician. He is best known for portraying the disciple Simon Peter in the Christian historical drama series The Chosen.

== Early life and education ==
Isaac was born in Haifa, Israel, in February 1993. He is of Yemenite Jewish heritage. He later moved to the United States, where he attended Rutgers University and earned a Bachelor of Fine Arts degree in acting, studying under Barbara Marchant and David Esbjornson.

== Career ==
Isaac made his television debut in 2015, playing Tariq Al Juhani in the series Person of Interest. In 2017, he appeared in National Theatre Live: Salomé as Simon bar Giora, and in Price for Freedom. He later guest-starred in Madam Secretary (2018), portraying Salman.

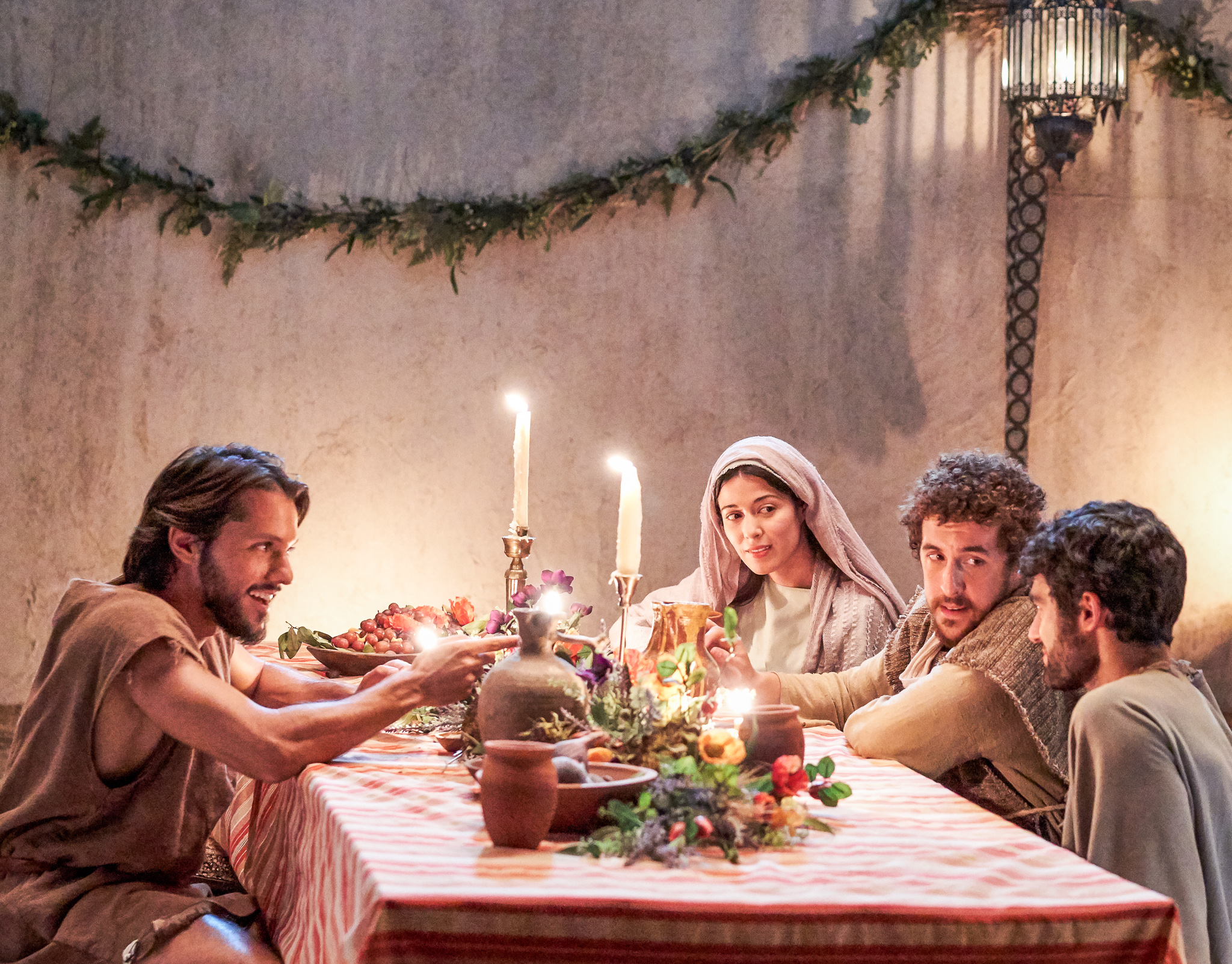

Isaac gained prominence for his role as Simon Peter in The Chosen, a television drama about the life of Jesus, created by Dallas Jenkins. The show premiered in 2017, with first-billed Isaac playing the role across the series. In 2022, he appeared in The Good Fight as Zev Beker, an Israeli Krav Maga instructor.

== Personal life ==
Outside acting, Isaac is a photographer. He operates a professional photography website, and his work has been exhibited in galleries. He has also published a photo-art book titled The Road Begins in Capernaum.

Isaac is also a musician, playing the guitar and bass, and occasionally shares his performances online. He is multilingual, speaking Hebrew, English, Spanish, and Portuguese, and has helped fellow actors with dialect coaching for The Chosen.

Isaac completed his compulsory military service in the Israel Defense Forces (IDF). In line with Israeli regulations requiring citizens under 40 to serve when needed, he was recalled to reserve duty following the events of 2023.

== Filmography ==
Key
†	Denotes films that have not yet been released

=== Television ===
Year	Title	Role	Notes
2015	Person of Interest	Tariq Al Juhani	1 episode
2018	Madam Secretary	Salman	1 episode
2022	The Good Fight	Zev Beker	3 episodes
2019-present	The Chosen	Simon Peter	Main role
2026	Nemesis	Andrei Malakian	3 episodes

=== Film ===
Year	Title	Role	Notes
2017	Price for Freedom	Sepuhr	Action/Drama

== Theatre credits ==
Year	Title	Role	Venue
2022–24	Salomé	Bar Giora	National Theatre Live
