= Nick Shakoour =

Lebanese-American actor

Nick Shakoour is a Lebanese-American actor most famous for portraying Zebedee in the television series The Chosen.

== Early life ==
Shakoour is from Beirut, Lebanon. He grew up during the war in the country. He had a religious upbringing, and his grandfather was a Greek Orthodox priest. He emigrated to America.

== Career ==
Shakoour is most famous for the role of Zebedee in The Chosen. Besides that, he had roles in the film Madaran, TV series State of Affairs and other roles.

== Personal life ==
Shakoour has no children.

== Books ==
Shakoour published the book Transformer: Awakening From A Spiritual Coma – A Nick Shakoour Autobiography.
