= SYD2030 =

- Genre: Drama
- Created by: Tatjana Marjanovic
- Starring: Tatjana Marjanovic; George Xanthis; Sophie Luck; Abe Mitchell; Laura Benson; Nick Wright; Johnny Emery; Dominic Deutscher
- Country of origin: Australia
- Original language: English
- No. of seasons: 2
- No. of episodes: 23

Production
- Production location: Sydney
- Running time: 10 minutes per episode

Original release
- Release: 6 March 2012 – present

SYD2030 is an Australian adult drama web series created by Australian production company, Cheese on Toast Productions. The show premiered on 6 March 2012 and made history by becoming the first ever web series to be distributed by the ABC. Inspired by shows like Gossip Girl and Skins, the series' two seasons follow Cameron Hunter, a law student, as his life begins to unravel.

== Plot ==
Cameron Hunter - trust fund baby, top of the class, beautiful girlfriend - but even he has his secrets. So when his past comes back to get him, how long will it take before the truth's revealed?

== Cast and characters ==
- Abe Mitchell as Cameron Hunter
- Tatjana Marjanovic as Bridget Knox
- George Xanthis as Leo Cassevetes
- Sophie Luck as Frankie Goldstein
- Laura Benson as Lara Lurhmann
- Johnny Emery as Christopher Lurhmann
- Nick Wright as Elliot Harrison
- Dominic Deutscher as William Grant
