= George H. Xanthis =

Australian actor, producer and comedian (born 1989)

- Born: Earlwood, Sydney, Australia
- Known for: The Chosen
- Children: 1

George H. Xanthis (born 1989) is an Australian actor and producer best known for portraying John the Apostle in the television series The Chosen.

== Early life ==
George H. Xanthis was born in September 1989 in Earlwood, Sydney. He attended a primary school in Kingsford, New South Wales. He is of Greek Orthodox origin.

== Career ==
Xanthis worked in a theatre for six years before getting a paid job on television. He produced and acted in the Australian TV series SYD2030 from 2012 to 2015. He won Webby Award for the series. He appeared in the series Open Slather (2015), for which he was nominated for AACTA Award. He played Rohan Asad in the Australian TV series Deep Water (2016). He played Italian-American mobster Frank Capone in the TV series The Making of the Mob: Chicago (2016). In 2018, he starred as John Travolta in the Australian miniseries Olivia Newton-John: Hopelessly Devoted to You.

Xanthis is playing John the Apostle in the historical drama TV series The Chosen (2019-). He cited the role as the best role of his life. Initially, he auditioned for the role of Praetor Quintus. For his role, he sought the local priest for advice. According to Xanthis, he was connected with the character because of his Greek heritage, and the Gospel of John was written in Greek. In his opinion, one of the strengths of The Chosen is the ability to humanize historical figures from the Bible. In 2021, he played television presenter George Stephanopoulos in the television series Impeachment: American Crime Story. He starred as a voice actor in the animated TV series The Chosen Adventures (2025), inspired by The Chosen.

== Personal life ==
Xanthis is married and has one son. He said that he was a Cultural Christian before acting in The Chosen, but has since been doing his own study of the Gospels.

== Filmography ==
Year	Title	Role	Footnote
2012-2015	SYD2030	Leo Cassevetes	Main role
2015	Open Slather	Himself / Various roles	Main role
2016	Deep Water	Rohan Asad	
2016	The Making of the Mob: Chicago	Frank Capone	
2018	Olivia Newton-John: Hopelessly Devoted to You	John Travolta	
2019–present	The Chosen	John the Apostle	
2021	Impeachment: American Crime Story	George Stephanopoulos	
