= Derral Eves =

American online personality and advertiser

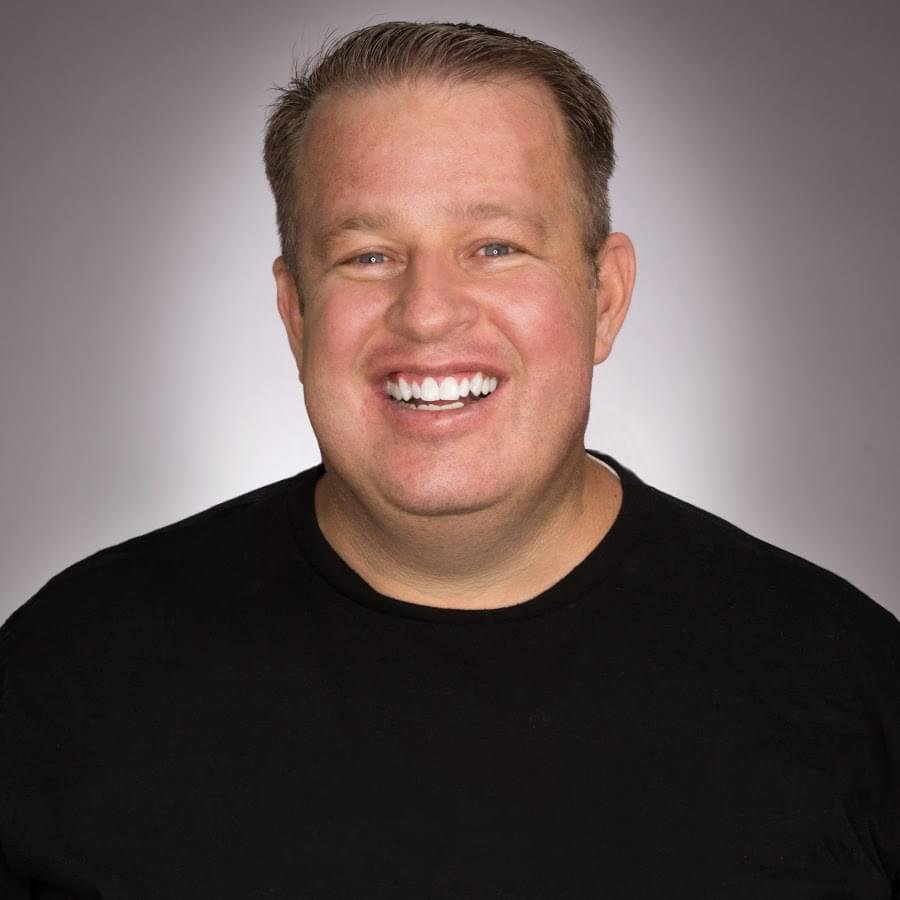
Eves in 2021

Derral Eves is an American digital media producer.

== Career ==
Eves graduated from Southern Utah University with a degree in public relations and advertising. His first job was the assistant director of public relations at a hospital in Utah but he left to start his own interactive agency in 1999, Creatus.

Eveshas been working with brands and businesses through his agency since 1999. Clients have included Bill Gates, Epic Games, The Piano Guys, ABC, NBC, and ESPN.

Search Engine Journal described Eves as the "godfather of YouTube optimization".

Social Media Examiner reported that Eves quintupled the earnings of a pest control company, and helped The Piano Guys go from retail piano store owners to having more than 1.8 million subscribers. Eves also worked on the three-minute ad for Squatty Potty, which appeared on the reality investor TV show Shark Tank and Dr Oz, and won "Ad of the Year" at the 2015 Webby Awards. In 2015, it was reported the video had more than 43 million views on YouTube and Facebook. As of November 2021, the video had more than 39 million views on YouTube alone. Boing Boing described the ad as "the greatest viral ad in Internet history".

In 2013, Eves founded VidSummit, an annual event with the top YouTubers on how to build a brand and grow revenue. Eves was reported as saying it had one rule – speakers were not allowed to promote themselves.

Eves was number four on Forbes' list of "20 Must Watch YouTube Channels That Will Change Your Business".

In 2014, Eves produced and coordinated an attempt at setting a Guinness World Record for the largest live nativity scene. In Provo, Utah, US, 1,039 people volunteered themselves and their animals, which was reported to break the previously held record set in Lancashire, United Kingdom in 2013 with 898 people. Eves said he was able to organize such a large number of people through social media. The video was released in December 2014.

=== Writing ===
In 2021, Eves authored "The YouTube Formula: How Anyone Can Unlock the Algorithm to Drive Views, Build an Audience, and Grow Revenue". The book was released as hardcover and e-book. The book is described as providing the inner workings of the YouTube algorithm and how creators can use it to their advantage. The book became a Wall Street Journal Best Seller in February 2021.

=== Production of The Chosen ===
Eves was introduced to Dallas Jenkins, creator of The Chosen, a television show about the life of Jesus Christ.Jenkins named him to be executive producer, with his primary responsibility being to build the audience through the show's social media platforms.

According to Eves, he was shown a short film Jenkins did for his church, called The Shepherd. "It was shown to me. It was just amazing. He said, 'Let's do a television series.' That's how I got in on the project. I met Dallas and we became partners."

Eves helped scout locations for the first season, securing Capernaum Village in Weatherford, Texas. Capernaum Village offers film set rental and live experiences for tourists, to recreate the historical Capernaum. The filming was supplemented by a sound stage and visual effects.

Season 2 moved filming to Utah's version of ancient Israel in Goshen, Utah County, where The Church of Jesus Christ of Latter-day Saints built a replica Jerusalem movie set to film scenes for their Bible and Book of Mormon videos. In October 2020, Eves signed a lease to use the Jerusalem set. It is the first time a production not affiliated with the Church of Jesus Christ Latter-day Saints has filmed at the Motion Picture Studio South Campus. On this filming location, Eves said, "It is unbelievable. This is the dream location to shoot this story. You have the Dead Sea and the Sea of Galilee, and this area has the Great Salt Lake and the Utah Lake and the River Jordan connects the two. You can't get much better than that!"

Eves said his goal is for 1 billion people to watch the show.

Due to the ongoing COVID-19 pandemic, which initially suspended filming of the second season at the beginning of 2020, Eves set up ongoing tests for the cast and crew, costing $800,000. Seven seasons are planned.

== Bibliography ==
- The Youtube Formula: How Anyone Can Unlock The Algorithm To Drive Views, Build An Audience, And Grow Revenue. Wiley, 2023. ISBN 978-1-119-71602-0
