= Jonathan Roumie =

American actor (born 1974)

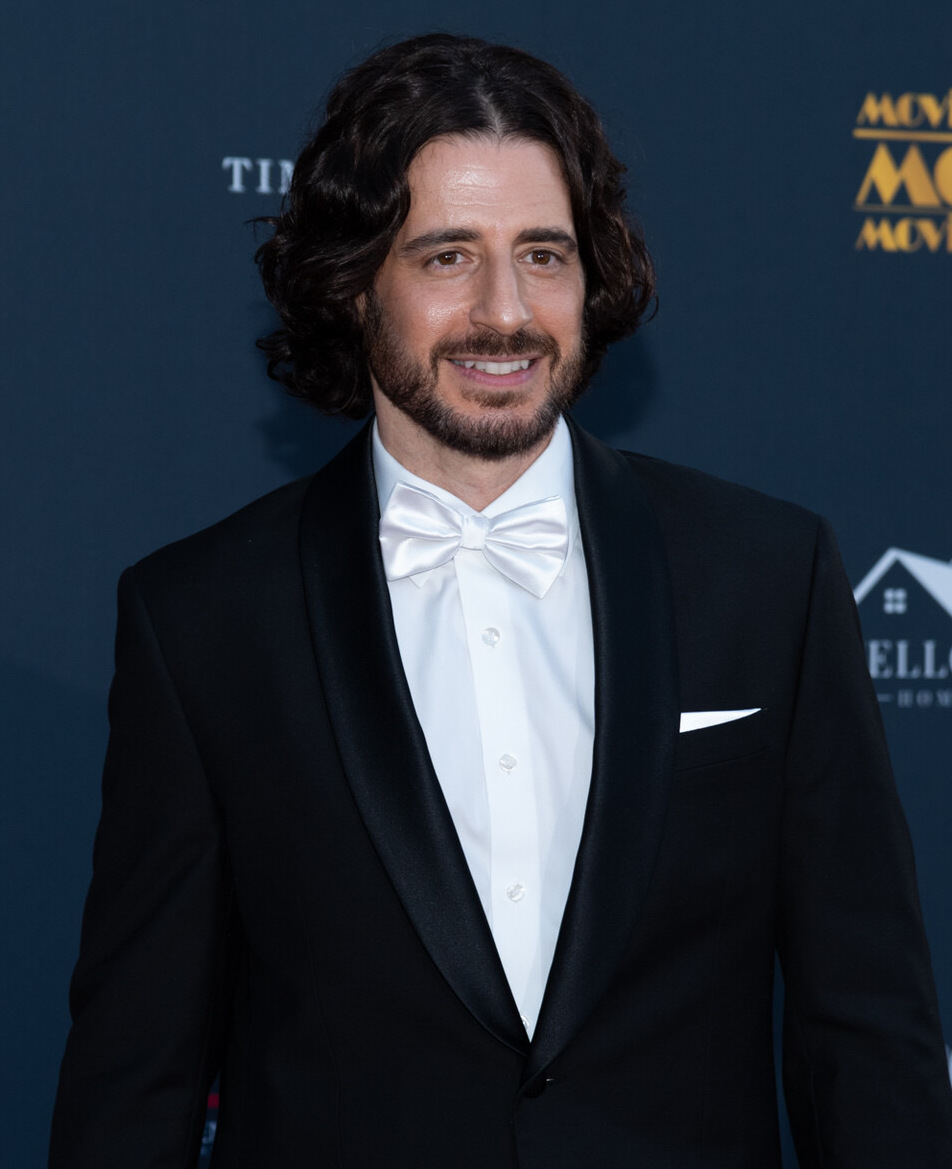
- Roumie in January 2020
- Born: July 1, 1974 (age 52); New York City, New York, U.S.
- Education: School of Visual Arts (BFA)
- Occupation: Actor
- Years active: 2000–present
- Known for: The Chosen

Jonathan Roumie (born July 1, 1974) is an American actor. He is best known for his role as Jesus in The Chosen, a crowd-funded television series about the life and ministry of Jesus of Nazareth. In 2023, he portrayed evangelist Lonnie Frisbee in the film Jesus Revolution. He is also a voice artist and a public speaker.

== Early life ==
A first-generation American, Roumie's father was born in Egypt and is of Syro-Lebanese descent; his mother is from Ireland. Roumie has stated that his great-grandparents on his father's side were Armenian.

Before his parents moved to and later met in New York City (where Roumie was born), Roumie's mother was raised on a farm in Ireland with his father being raised in Cairo, Egypt. Though he was baptized in the Orthodox Church, Roumie converted to Catholicism after moving from New York to its suburbs. He holds a degree in film from the School of Visual Arts. In 2024, he was awarded an honorary doctorate in fine arts by the Catholic University of America for his work evangelizing through his acting career.

After graduating from college, Roumie played drums in his friend's contemporary rock band. The band had recorded an album and were due to go on tour but the recording company sponsoring the tour went bankrupt. Shortly after, Roumie moved to Los Angeles to pursue a career in film and television.

== Career ==
=== Film and television ===
Roumie started in the entertainment industry as production assistant and was the location scout for Spider-Man, National Treasure and I Am Legend. He also created music, and his first original song, "Outta Time", was released in Europe for the album Unbreakable, which he co-produced. He began seeking acting work and made his first appearance as a voice actor for the MTV series Celebrity Deathmatch. He eventually began landing minor roles on television series, including The Good Wife, As the World Turns, and Castle, and moved to Los Angeles to pursue a full-time acting career.

Roumie met Dallas Jenkins, creator of The Chosen, in 2014 when Jenkins was the media director for a large church in Illinois and cast Roumie for the role of Jesus in a short film about the Two Thieves. He played the character of Christ for the first time in a touring multi-media project about the life of St. Faustina called Faustina: Messenger of Divine Mercy and subsequently in 'Once we were Slaves/The Two Thieves'. Roumie is also the co-producer, co-director and lead actor of The Last Days: The Passion and Death of Jesus, a live performance about the passion of Christ.

After eight years in Los Angeles, Roumie was struggling to sustain his acting career and relied on government assistance payments, which eventually ran out. He woke up one morning completely broke. He recalls that during the crisis, "I didn't see any way out. So I literally said: 'God, you take this from me. It's in your hands now. I'm not going to worry about it.' Then, three months later, The Chosen comes along. I thought, OK, I just needed to submit." Roumie played Jesus in the pilot episode for The Chosen in 2017 and would become the star of the full series.

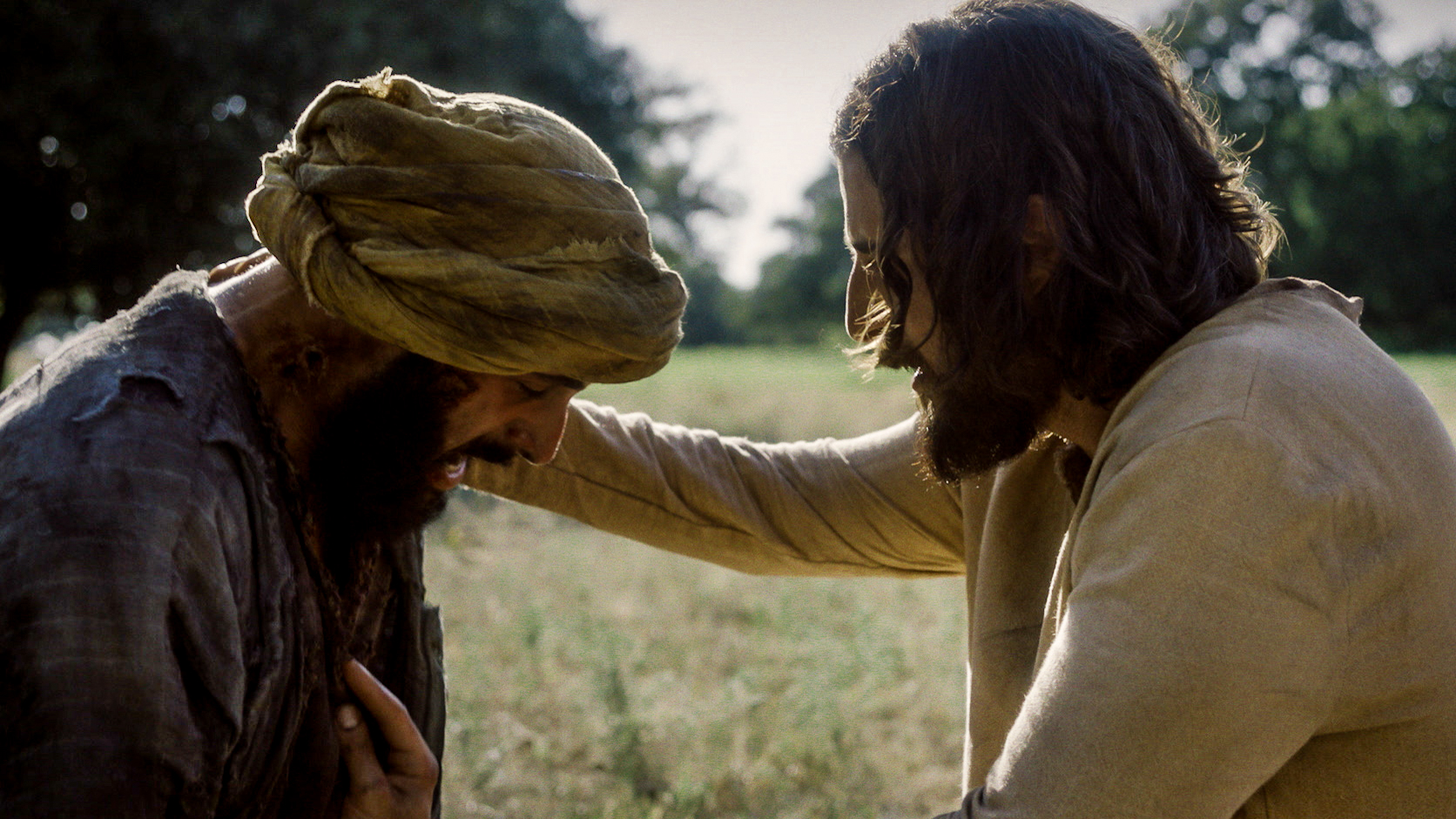
The Chosen – Jesus heals a leper in Season 1, Episode 6

Now known worldwide for portraying Jesus in the series, Roumie has been featured in numerous publications, including TV Guide, the National Catholic Register, America Magazine, and The Atlantic, and The New Yorker. He has also been interviewed on network television for shows such as The View, Fox News, EWTN, and various religious-based news and information outlets.

Regarding the challenges of portraying Jesus, Roumie has said, "Very often, I don't feel worthy of playing Jesus. I struggle with that a lot. But I also acknowledge what God has done for my life as a result of playing Christ and how God has changed my life." A documentary miniseries titled Jonathan and Jesus depicted Roumie's personal story and the effect playing Jesus has had on his public image and personal life.

He portrayed charismatic hippie evangelist Lonnie Frisbee in the 2023 film Jesus Revolution. In 2026, he appeared in the romantic comedy film Solo Mio alongside actor Kevin James.

=== Other appearances ===
Roumie has done voiceover work for various video games since very early in his career, such as Batman: Dark Tomorrow, Fallout 4 and Days Gone; his most notable role is as Dollman in Hideo Kojima's 2025 game Death Stranding 2: On the Beach. He also serves as a narrator for the Catholic prayer app Hallow. Roumie appeared in the Super Bowl 2024 commercial for the app, causing a huge spike in downloads of Hallow.

Roumie is also a public speaker. He was a keynote speaker at March For Life. He also was one of the revival session speakers at the 10th National Eucharistic Congress 2024 with over 55,000 participants in attendance. At one time, Roumie was involved in an entertainment fellowship for Christian entertainment professionals.

== Personal life ==
Roumie has been a ministry leader and has served as an extraordinary minister of Holy Communion within the Catholic Church. He is a strong advocate of the sacraments, ecumenism, humility and charity. He serves on the board of Catholics in Media Associates. He was also named one of Aleteia's "10 Catholics who restored our faith in humanity" in 2021 and made it onto Our Sunday Visitor's list of Catholics of the Year in 2022. He is pro-life. A keynote speaker at the 2023 March for Life, Roumie told participants, "God is love, and true love gives way to life, not death."

As of 2022, Roumie was residing in Los Angeles. Roumie can be found hosting live prayers on Instagram, some of which have been viewed nearly 100,000 times. He prays the Chaplet of the Divine Mercy. Roumie is also an illustrator, and won awards in high school for this work.

== Awards ==
Year	Association	Category	Nominated work	Result	Ref.
2020	Movieguide Awards	Grace Prize for Most Inspiring Performance for TV	The Chosen, Episode 1.8 – "I am He"	Won	
2022	Movieguide Awards	Grace Prize for Most Inspiring Performance for TV	The Chosen, Episode 2.8 – "Beyond Mountains"	Nominated	
2023	Movieguide Awards	Grace Prize for Most Inspiring Performance for TV	The Chosen, Episode 3.3 – "Physician, Heal Yourself"	Nominated	
2024	GMA Dove Award	TV Series of the Year	Jonathan and Jesus (TV series)	Nominated	
2024	K-Love Fan Awards	TV/Streaming Impact	Jonathan and Jesus (TV series)	Won	
2025	K-Love Fan Awards	Film Impact	The Chosen, Season 5 (Theatrical Release)	Won	

== Filmography ==
=== Television ===
Year	Name	Role	Notes	Ref
2000–2002	Celebrity Deathmatch	Various	12 episodes; voice only	
2006	Oh! Be Joyful!	Jim James	Television film, also executive producer and writer	
2007	As the World Turns	Jim Fellows	6 episodes	
2008	Law & Order	Richie Citrone	Episode: "Excalibur"	
2009–2010	Wonder Pets!	Loch Ness Daddy, Critic #2	2 episodes, Uncredited as Critic #2	
2012	Parenthood	Cop	Episode: "Everything Is Not Okay"	
2014	Castle	Serge Belmonde	Episode: "Dressed to Kill"	
2014	Hart of Dixie	Jeffrey	Episode: "Carrying Your Love with Me"	
2014	NCIS	Officer Gerard	Episode: "The Admiral's Daughter"	
2014	The Newsroom	Bartender	Episode: "What Kind Of Day Has It Been"	
2015	Dog with a Blog	Dr. Monfore	Episode: "Stan Has Puppies"	
2015	NCIS: Los Angeles	Perry Gaffney	Episode: "Defectors"	
2016	The Good Wife	Monte Ecklund	Episode: "Shoot"	
2017	The Mindy Project	Dr. Montpellier	Episode: "Danny in Real Life"	
2019	Ballers	Splyce Owner	Episode: "Players Only"	
2020	Chicago Med	Christian Edwards	Episode: "A Needle in the Heart"	
2019–present	The Chosen	Jesus	Main cast (42 episodes)	
2023	Castlevania: Nocturne	The Marquis	Voice; 2 episodes	
2024	Tomb Raider: The Legend of Lara Croft	Kaya's Aide, Guard #2, Winston	Voice; 2 episodes	
2025–present	The Chosen Adventures	Jesus	Voice; recurring role (14 episodes)	

=== Film ===
Year	Name	Role	Notes	Ref
2013	Saving Lincoln	John Wilkes Booth		
2013	A Day In The Country	Hal	Short; Canon Imagin8tion Contest Winner	
2014	Once We Were Slaves	Jesus	Short; renamed The Two Thieves	
2015	Nostradamus	Radio Voice	Short	
2022	Night at the Museum: Kahmunrah Rises Again	Merenkhare	Voice	
2023	Jesus Revolution	Lonnie Frisbee		
2024	Heart of a Servant - Father Flanagan story	Voice	Executive producer and narrator	
2026	Solo Mio	Neil		

=== Video games ===
Year	Name	Role	Notes
2003	Batman: Dark Tomorrow	Tim Drake / Robin, Robber #1, Guard, False-facer	
2010	Mafia II	Italian Civilian, Gangster, Greaser	
2012	The Darkness II	Enzo, Additional Voices	
2013	The Bureau: XCOM Declassified	Asaru, Dr. Murphy, Pete Weaver	
2013	Lost Planet 3	Renard Laroche	
2015	Evolve	Additional Voices	
2015	Fallout 4	Jack Cabot, Doc Weathers, Honest Dan	
2016	XCOM 2	Soldier, Additional Voices	
2016	Mafia III	Additional Voices	
2017	Agents of Mayhem	Pride Trooper	
2018	God of War	Additional Voices	
2018	Call of Duty: Black Ops 4	Various Voices	
2019	Days Gone	Russell	
2019	Death Stranding	Mules	
2020	Ghost of Tsushima	Additional Characters	
2022	Saints Row	Character Voices, Saints Characters	
2025	Death Stranding 2: On the Beach	Dollman	
