= Carlos Aguilar (writer) =

Spanish film critic and novelist (born 1958)

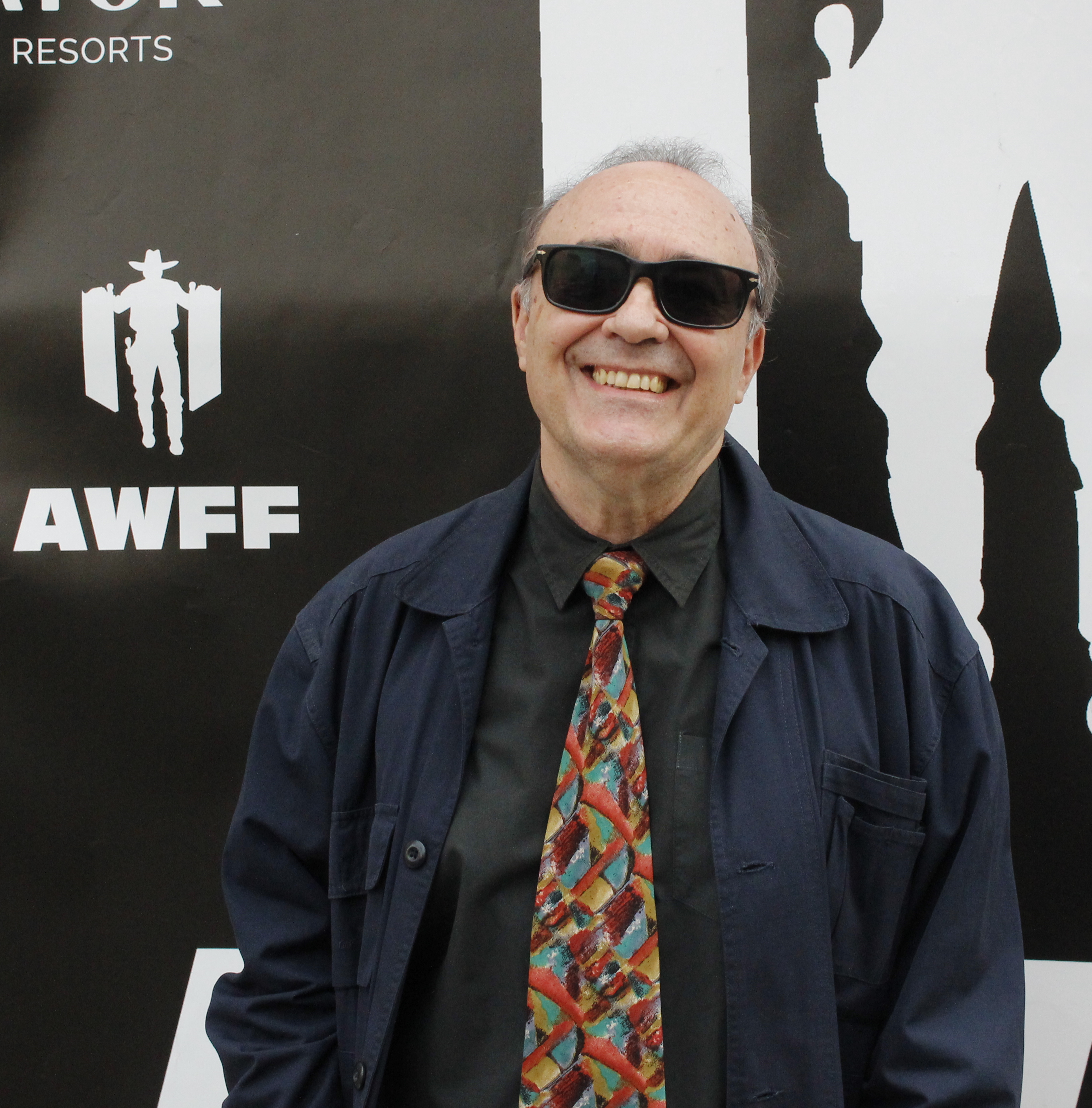
Aguilar attending the 2024 Almería Western Film Festival

Carlos Aguilar (born 1958) is a Spanish film critic and novelist.

== Early life and education ==
Carlos Aguilar was born in Madrid in 1958 and in 1979 started to write fanzines, among them one about fantasy cinema, Morpho, and in the meantime he studied Psychology at the Autonomous University of Madrid, and then Cinema in the Imaginary Arts Workshop.

== Career ==
Aguilar made his professional debut in 1982 and since then, as well as other cinema related activities (such as collaboration in the organization of festivals and the Filmoteca Española), he has participated in many Spanish and foreign magazines (such as French Mad Movies, German Schnitt, Italian Nocturno and in Spain Nosferatu, Quatermass, Fotogramas, Casablanca, Nickel Odeon and Cuadernos de la Academia).

== Publications ==
In addition to these collaborations in magazines, Carlos Aguilar has published over fifty books on cinema, counting individual and collective works, in Spain, Italy and Germany, both for commercial publishers and festivals sponsored by various institutions (Deputation of Almería, Festival Board of San Sebastian, etc.).

Among the works of individual authorship, can be highlighted Joaquín Romero Marchent. La firmeza del profesional (1999), Ricardo Palacios. Actor, director, observador (2003), Giuliano Gemma. El factor romano (2003), La espada mágica. El cine fantástico de aventuras (2006), Sergio Leone, Guía del cine, Guía del cine español and Clint Eastwood in Spain, as well as Jess Franco. El sexo del horror (1999) and FantaEspaña (2002), in Italy.

He has also participated as editor and advisor in the documentary Sergio Leone. Cinema, cinema (2000) and the series Érase una vez en Europa (2001) about the European fantastic cinema of the 1950s, 1960s and 1970s, presented by Christopher Lee.
