= Yaël Farber =

South African director and playwright (born 1971)

- Born: 1971 (age 54–55); Johannesburg
- Citizenship: South Africa
- Occupations: Playwright, Film director, Film screenwriter

Yaël Farber is a South African director and playwright.

== Early life ==
Farber was born in Johannesburg, South Africa in 1971.

== Books ==
Molora was published by Oberon Books in 2008 . Farber wrote the book as an Ancient Greek type of chorus production with the main influences of the themes being the rural Xhosa aesthetic.

Theatre as witness was published by Oberon Books in 2008. Genre drama. Farber wrote about three testimonial plays that South Africa has produced by collaborating with the original performers and their lives.

RAM: The abduction of Sita into darkness was published by Oberon Books in 2012. Genre drama. This book is a contemporary stage adaptation of the tale of The Ramanya from the Hindu culture.

Mies Julie: Based on August Strindberg's Miss Julie was published Oberon Books in 2012. Genre Drama. This is a stage adaptation of Strindbergs Miss Julie based in the Karoo of South Africa.

Farber Plays One was published by Oberon Books in 2015. Genre Drama. This book is the compilation of Farber's three books. Molora, RAM: The Abduction of Sita Into Darkness and Mies Julie.

== Plays ==
Farber directed a Shakespeare piece Hamlet. Performed at The Gate in Dublin, Ireland from September 21 to 27 October 2018, with a revival at St. Ann's Warehouse in Brooklyn, New York in February 2020. The play starred Irish actress Ruth Negga in the titular role.

Knives in Hens, written by David Harrower and directed by Yaël Farber. Performed at the Donmar Warehouse, London, UK from August 17 to October 7, 2017.

Les Blancs, written by Lorraine Hansberry and directed by Yaël Farber.

Salomé was adapted and directed by Yaël Farber. Performed at the National Theatre Olivier stage, London, UK from May 3 to July 16, 2017 and at the Shakespeare Theatre Company, Washington D.C., United States from October 6 to November 8, 2015.

Nirbhaya, written and directed by Yaël Farber. Performed on different tours from 2013 to 2015.

Mies Julie, adapted from August Strindberg Miss Julie. Written and directed by Yaël Farber. Performed on different tours from 2012 to 2017.

Kadmos, adapted from Sophocles Theban plays. Created and adapted by Yaël Farber. Performed at the National Theatre school of Canada on 25 February 2011.

Molora, written and directed by Yaël Farber. Performed on different tours from 2007 to 2011.

Sezar, adapted from Shakespeares Julius Caesar and written by Yaël Farber. Performed on different tours from 2001 to 2002.

He Left Quietly, written and directed by Yaël Farber. Performed on different tours in 2002.

Amajuba, created and written by Yaël Farber. Performed on different tours from 2001 to 2007.

Woman in Waiting, written by Yaël Farber with Thembi Mtshali-Jones. Performed on different tours from 2001 to 2013.

== Movies ==
The Crucible, written by Arthur Miller and Directed by Yaël Farber. Produced in 2014.

== Awards and nominations ==
- EVENING STANDARD BEST DIRECTOR NOMINATION 2014 London, UK for "THE CRUCIBLE" BROADWAY WORLD BEST DIRECTOR AWARD 2014 London, UK for "THE CRUCIBLE"
- ASIAN MEDIA BEST LIVE EVENT AWARD 2014 London, UK for "NIRBHAYA".
- DORA MAYOR MOORE AWARD 2014 Toronto, Canada for "MIES JULIE".
- ELLIOT NORTON AWARD 2013 Boston, USA ~ MIES JULIE.
- NALEDI BEST DIRECTOR AWARD 2013 National Award, South Africa for "MIES JULIE".
- AMNESTY INTERNATIONAL FREEDOM OF EXPRESSION AWARD 2013.Edinburgh, Scotland for "NIRBHAYA"
- SCOTSMAN FRINGE FIRST AWARD 2013 Edinburgh, Scotland for "NIRBHAYA"
- ANGEL HERALD AWARD 2013 Edinburgh, Scotland for "NIRBHAYA" BEST OF EDINBURGH AWARD 2012.
- Edinburgh, Scotland FOR "MIES JULIE" SCOTSMAN FRINGE FIRST AWARD 2012.
- Edinburgh, Scotland for "MIES JULIE" ANGEL HERALD AWARD 2012.
- Edinburgh, Scotland for "MIES JULIE" FLEUR DE KAP BEST DIRECTOR AWARD 2012.
- Cape Town, South Africa for "MIES JULIE" NALEDI BEST DIRECTOR AWARD 2008.
- National Award, South Africa for "MOLORA" NALEDI BEST CUTTING EDGE PRODUCTION 2008.
- National Award, South Africa for "MOLORA"
- TMA BEST DIRECTOR NOMINATION 2008
- National award, United Kingdom for "MOLORA" DRAMA DESK AWARD NOMINATION 2007
- New York, USA for "AMAJUBA" ANGEL HERALD AWARD 2003
- Edinburgh, Scotland for "AMAJUBA"
- STANDARD BANK ARTIST OF THE YEAR AWARD 2002
- National Award, South Africa
- FNB VITA BEST DIRECTOR AWARD 2001
- National Award, South Africa for "SEZAR"
- FNB VITA BEST PRODUCTION 2001 National Award, South Africa for "SEZAR" ("SEZAR" received a total of 4 FNB National Vita Awards)
- BBC GOLD SONY AWARD 2001 London, UK for "WOMAN IN WAITING" Scotsman FRINGE FIRST AWARD 2000
