= Social Media Examiner =

U.S.-based media company

- Company type: Private
- Website type: Blog
- Available in: English
- Founded: October 2009
- Headquarters: Poway, California, U.S.
- Founder: Michael Stelzner
- Website: SocialMediaExaminer.com
- Current status: Active

Social Media Examiner is a U.S.-based media company, founded by Michael Stelzner. It publishes blogs and podcasts about how businesspeople can use social networks. The website publishes original research, has a weekly podcast show and oversees multiple communities for social media marketers.

== Reports and conferences ==
In 2018, 5,700 marketers participated in Social Media Examiner's study of how marketers and businesses are using social media. The report has been cited in Entrepreneur and Inc. magazine.

== Awards ==
Technorati ranks the site as one of the Top 100 Business and Top 100 Small Business blogs. Social Media Examiner has been discussed in several books including, The New Relationship Marketing: How to Build a Large, Loyal Profitable Network using the Social Web by Mari Smith,

and The Entrepreneur’s Information Source Book: Charting the Path to Small Business Success, 2nd ed. by Susan C. Awe.
