= Minno =

Christian media service for children

- Founded: October 2018; 8 years ago
- Founders: Erick Goss; Dan Raines
- Products: Christian streaming media for children
- Website: https://www.gominno.com

Minno (formerly known as JellyTelly) is an online subscription-based streaming media provider created by Erick Goss and Dan Raines. It specializes in Christian programming for children. Subscribers have access to over 2,300 episodes from 130 shows. Video is made available through applications for smartphones, tablets, and popular streaming devices such as Roku, Amazon Fire TV, Apple TV, Android TV and Chromecast.

== History ==
Minno began when founders Erick Goss and Dan Raines wanted to offer parents a streaming platform that included an ad-free streaming experience featuring shows about the Bible and Christian discipleship. The name Minno is derived from the Greek word “meno” which means "to abide" and is a reference to John 15 in the New Testament of the Bible. Minno is the operating name of Winsome Truth, Inc., which was formed by Goss and Raines in 2018 following the acquisition of the app under its former name, JellyTelly. Goss is a tech and military veteran, and Raines is a Christian media executive. The company is the recipient of TINYPulse’s 2020 Happiest Company Award. Today, Minno is both privately funded by investors and on subscriber revenue. It is a benefit corporation.

== Programming ==
Minno licenses and creates original programming that is vetted through a 50+ point checklist focused on child development, theology, and entertainment quality. Shows are developed with and licensed from studios around the world, including France, South Africa, New Zealand, Canada, and the United States. Minno also currently offers the largest selection of original VeggieTales videos on a single platform through an agreement with NBCUniversal.

The company’s current original content includes:

- 5-Minute Family Devotionals
- Church at Home
- Hopeful Easter
- Cocoa Talk
- Galaxy Buck Mission To Sector 9: The Series
- Micah’s Super Vlog
- Fruit of the Fitness
- Pops and Peanut
- The Minno Day Show

=== Home video releases ===
The characters of Minno have recently starred in a new spinoff series by Phil Vischer titled "What's In The Bible with Buck Denver?". What's In The Bible was released in over 13 DVD volumes (each with two 25 minute episodes). The series covers the entire Bible. The first two volumes were released on March 1, 2010. Also, Why Do We Call It Christmas?, Clive and Ian's Wonder-Blimp of Knowledge, Sing Through the Bible! and Galaxy Buck: Mission to Sector 9.

== COVID lockdowns ==
During the COVID lockdowns of 2020 and 2021, Minno offered a free weekly “Church at Home” experience on its website for families not attending in-person church.
