= Elizabeth Tabish =

American actress

Elizabeth "Liz" Tabish (born May 26, 1986) is an American actress. She is known for portraying Mary of Magdala in The Chosen (2017-present).

Tabish was born in Utah.

She said in an interview with Parade that she "grew up Catholic."

Tabish is of Armenian, Lebanese and Italian descent. She has one son, born 2004.

== Select filmography ==
- The Veil (2017) – Warrior's Mother (credited as Liz Tabish)
- Alita: Battle Angel (2019) – Waitress (uncredited)
- The Shift (2023) – Molly Garner
- The Best Christmas Pageant Ever (2024) – Mrs. Grady
- Between Borders (2025) – Violetta Petrosyan
