= Dallas Jenkins =

American film and television director and producer

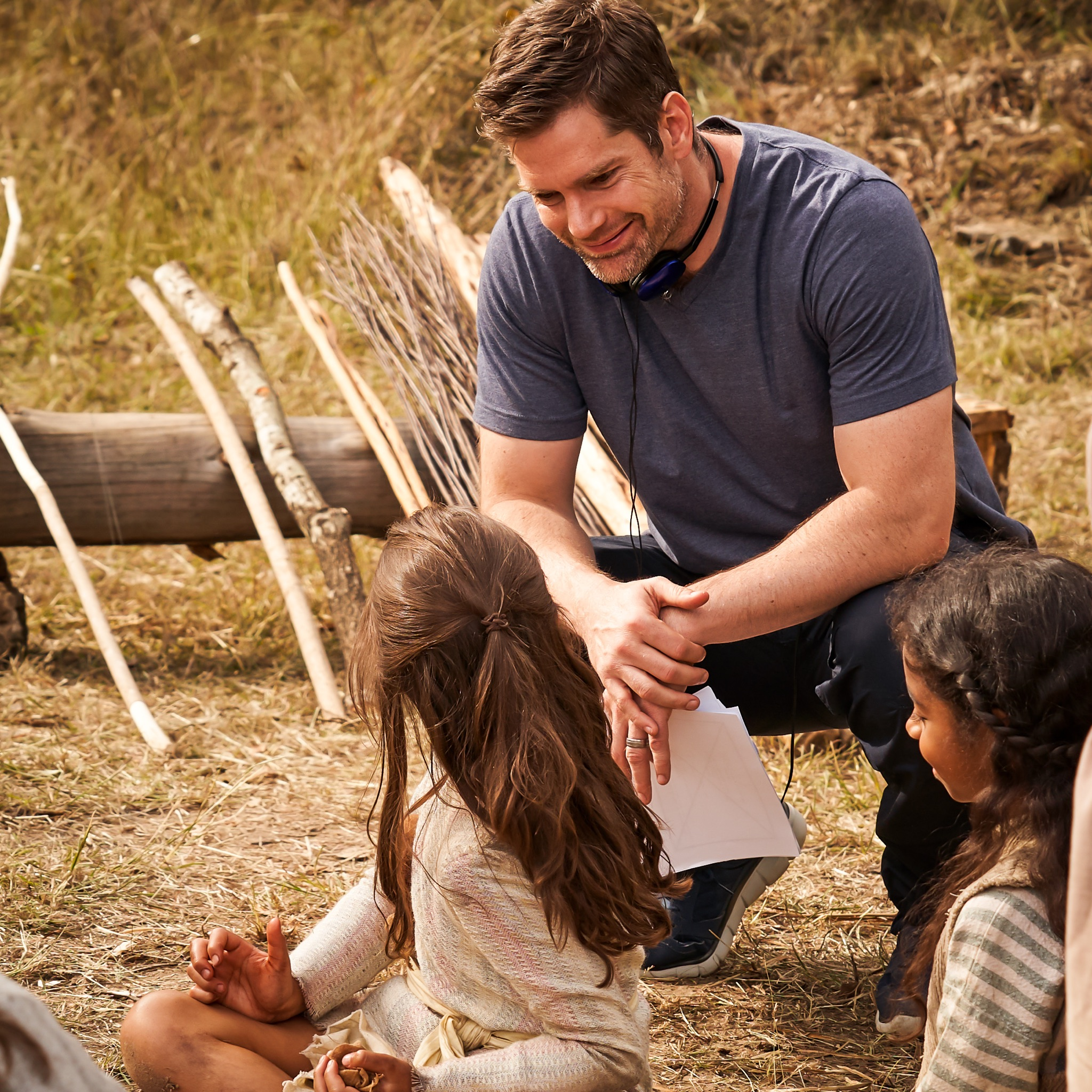
- Jenkins directing an episode of The Chosen in 2018
- Born: Dallas Lawrence Jenkins; July 25, 1975 (age 51); St. Charles, Illinois, United States
- Education: University of Northwestern – St. Paul
- Occupations: Director, screenwriter, producer
- Years active: 2000–present
- Notable work: The Chosen; The Resurrection of Gavin Stone; The Best Christmas Pageant Ever
- Spouse: Amanda Jenkins (m. 1998)
- Children: 4
- Parent(s): Jerry B. Jenkins (father), Dianna Jenkins (mother)

Dallas Jenkins (born July 25, 1975) is an American film and television director, writer and producer. He is best known as the creator, director, co-writer and executive producer of The Chosen, the first multi-season series about the life of Jesus of Nazareth. Jenkins's career is focused on Christian media.

== Early life ==
Jenkins was born in St. Charles, Illinois, the son of Dianna Louise (Whiteford) and Jerry B. Jenkins, a Christian novelist best known for the Left Behind series, one of the highest-selling book series of all time, selling over 60 million copies. In 1997, Jenkins graduated from University of Northwestern-St. Paul, where he met his wife, Amanda.

When he first began working in Hollywood, Jenkins was adamant that he did not want to do Christian movies. Though his faith was important to him, he and his wife thought it almost shameful to be labeled as a Christian filmmaker. However, Jenkins's mind was changed when he was mowing his lawn—he estimates in 2006 or 2007—and he felt that God was telling him to make Christian film content. Despite believing that it was a call from divinity, Jenkins still tried to reject the idea on the notion that Christian movies are not good movies, but realized that perhaps his job was to make them good.

At the age of 25, Jenkins and his mother started a production company, Jenkins Entertainment, together. Their first film was Hometown Legend, a faith-based film which was distributed by Warner Brothers in 2000.

Jenkins is a former member of the executive leadership team at Harvest Bible Chapel where he served as the executive director of Vertical Church Media. Vertical Church Films, a branch of Harvest Bible Chapel, partnered with Blumhouse Productions and WWE Films to produce The Resurrection of Gavin Stone, a 2017 faith-based film that Jenkins directed with a reported budget of $2 million.

== Career ==
After producing Hometown Legend and directing two short films, Jenkins's feature-length directorial debut was Midnight Clear in 2006. The film, which starred Stephen Baldwin and was distributed by Lionsgate, was based on a short story written by his father, Jerry Jenkins.

In 2010, Jenkins directed What If..., a film about a businessman who is shown by an angel what his life could have become if he had followed God's calling for his life. It starred Kevin Sorbo, Kristy Swanson, John Ratzenberger, and Disney star Debby Ryan. Box Office Mojo reports the film made US$814,906 domestically (equivalent to $1,203,000 in 2025). It was successful internationally and continues to be successful via DVD and streaming.

In 2017, Jenkins directed The Resurrection of Gavin Stone, a 2017 American Christian comedy-drama. The movie featured Brett Dalton (Agents of S.H.I.E.L.D.), comedian Anjelah Johnson, D.B. Sweeney (The Cutting Edge), Neil Flynn (The Middle), and wrestling legend Shawn Michaels. Jenkins labeled the film as a different kind of Christian movie, a sort of new experience for that audience. He attempted to do this by filling the movie with aspects that are not so common in Christian films, such as comedy. Accordingly, the Hollywood Reporter said of the film: "This genial religious-themed dramedy is refreshingly lacking in preachiness." It was, however, not considered a box office success. Box Office Mojo reports the film made US$2,308,355 gross worldwide (equivalent to $3,032,000 in 2025).

In an interview with CBN News, Jenkins described it as his "biggest career failure". After this, Jenkins made a short film for his church in Elgin, Illinois, U.S., The Shepherd; filmed on a friend's farm in Marengo. The short film is about the birth of Christ from the point of view of the shepherds.

The film got the attention of the filtering and streaming service VidAngel, which was embroiled in a copyright infringement lawsuit with major Hollywood studios and thus seeking original content to distribute. VidAngel suggested putting the short film on Facebook as a concept pilot to generate interest for Jenkins's idea of a multi-season series. The short film received over 15 million views around the world.

=== Vertical Church Films ===
After working in Hollywood for years, Jenkins had a shift in his mindset. He decided that he wanted to be a Christian filmmaker who makes quality Christian films rather than being a Christian who makes secular films. This shift moved him to move from Hollywood and to start Vertical Church films out of Harvest Bible Chapel in Chicago.

Vertical Church Films was launched in 2012 to produce Christian feature films. The ministry has produced four films: The Ride in 2012, Once We Were Slaves (retitled The Two Thieves) in 2014, The Resurrection of Gavin Stone in 2017, and The Shepherd in 2017. The Shepherd later became the pilot episode for Jenkins's new TV show, The Chosen.

=== The Chosen ===
The Chosen is a 2019 television drama based on the life of Jesus Christ, created, directed and co-written by Jenkins.

It is the first multi-season series about the life of Christ, and season 1 was one of the highest crowdfunded media projects of all time. Season 2 and Season 3 have a budget of $12 million and $18 million respectively, each crowdfunded. The other co-founder of The Chosen, Derral Eves, was introduced to Jenkins, and the two partnered to create and own The Chosen, with Eves as executive producer, primarily responsible for building the audience through their social media channels.

Jenkins owns a stake in the company but won't share profits until the startup investors earn back their initial investment plus 20 percent.

In 2021, Jenkins directed a Christmas special episode of The Chosen, which was released in 1,700 cinemas for ten days. In April 2022, Jenkins apologized to fans for not informing them about a deceptive marketing campaign involving defacing their own billboards promoting The Chosen.

In an interview with the Chicago Sun Times, Jenkins said, "We feel like if people can binge watch and have watch parties all over the world for shows like Game of Thrones and Stranger Things, there's no reason not to binge watch a show about Jesus. The term binge means to, you know, kind of have an obsession with something, and if we figure out how to have an obsession with Jesus, we might as well encourage that."

=== The Best Christmas Pageant Ever ===
2024 saw the release of a Jenkins-directed, feature-length film adaptation of the book The Best Christmas Pageant Ever. Lionsgate and Kingdom Story Company collaborated on the production, filmed in Canada beginning in December 2023. The film received positive reviews and became a box office success grossing $40 million against a $10 million budget.

== Personal life ==
Dallas Jenkins and his wife, Amanda, wed on June 13, 1998. They have four children. Dallas is an evangelical Christian.

Jenkins is a major sports enthusiast. At the age of five, he read the Chicago Tribune sports page every day. Inspired by his father, who was a sports writer when Dallas was a teenager, Dallas wanted to be a sports broadcaster when he was in middle school.
