= List of Bull (2016 TV series) episodes =

Expand description

Bull is an American legal drama television series created by Phil McGraw and Paul Attanasio and starring Michael Weatherly. CBS ordered the program to series on May 13, 2016, and it premiered on September 20, 2016. The show is based on the early days of talk show host Dr. Phil McGraw's career, when he was a trial consultant. On May 6, 2020, CBS renewed the series for a fifth season, which premiered on November 16, 2020. On April 15, 2021, CBS renewed the series for a sixth and final season, which premiered on October 7, 2021.

During the course of the series, 125 episodes of Bull aired over six seasons, between September 20, 2016, and May 26, 2022.

== Series overview ==
Season	Episodes	Originally released		Rank	Average viewership (in millions)
Season	Episodes	First released	Last released	Rank	Average viewership (in millions)
1	23	September 20, 2016	May 23, 2017	5	15.21
2	22	September 26, 2017	May 8, 2018	8	14.37
3	22	September 24, 2018	May 13, 2019	16	11.98
4	20	September 23, 2019	May 4, 2020	13	10.61
5	16	November 16, 2020	May 17, 2021	16	8.59
6	22	October 7, 2021	May 26, 2022	22	7.37

== Episodes ==
=== Season 1 (2016–17) ===
No. overall	No. in season	Title	Directed by	Written by	Original release date	Prod. code	U.S. viewers (millions)
1	1	"The Necklace"	Rodrigo García	Paul Attanasio & Dr. Phillip C. McGraw	September 20, 2016	101	15.56
Dr. Jason Bull, a divorced psychologist and expert jury consultant, is hired to help defend the son of a billionaire who had sex with a drug-dealing girl from his school. When the son is accused of murdering the girl, Bull must use his skills and technology to deduce the intentions of the jurors, his client, and everyone else involved.
2	2	"The Woman in 8D"	Doug Aarniokoski	Mark Goffman & David Wilcox	September 27, 2016	102	13.61
A commercial plane crash due to wind shear causes the deaths of 62 people, with the plane's female pilot, Captain Taylor Mathison (Trieste Kelly Dunn), being the lone survivor. To avoid negative publicity, the airline is complicit in getting a negligence lawsuit brought against Mathison. When Bull and his team learn juries would more likely acquit a male pilot, they must help Mathison get her life back and not be judged by her gender. In so doing, Bull convinces Mathison to fire her lawyer, who wants to settle, and has Benny try the case.
3	3	"Unambiguous"	Jan Eliasberg	Liz Kruger & Craig Shapiro	October 11, 2016	104	13.00
Bull and his team defend Reese (Celeste Arias), accused of the previously unsolved murder of a star college basketball player, after popular crime blogger Ellen Huff (Sarah Steele) reveals Reese was raped by the murder victim and had made threats against him. The case pits Benny against his former colleague and flame, Amanda (Tiffany Villarin). The team has to create reasonable doubt for the jurors by uncovering a steroid scandal among the basketball team as well as unedited audio that reveals Huff omitted salient facts in her blog. Things become more complicated when Huff herself ends up dead.
4	4	"Callisto"	Dennis Smith	Jesse Stern	October 18, 2016	105	12.29
When young genius Kerry Ketchum (Barrett Doss) is accused of patent infringement upon developing a superior drug to treat hemophilia B, which her baby sister has, Bull and his team have to travel to the (fictional) West Texas town of Callisto, where the case will be tried. While facing strong odds against winning, given that the town always favors their local prosecution teams in patent cases, Bull must also face former adversary Diana Lindsay (Jill Flint), his opponent in the only previous case he did not win.
5	5	"Just Tell the Truth"	Peter Werner	Cole Maliska	October 25, 2016	106	11.61
Budding chef Richard Fleer (Zach Appelman) confronts his fiancée after overhearing a conversation with her parents who disapprove of their marriage, and she storms out. She is later found dead in an alley, and a detective (Chance Kelly) is able to get a confession out of Richard. Bull is offered the job of supporting the prosecution in the case against Richard, but after hearing Richard's confession, Bull decides to support the defense. His team must now work with public defender Issac Chambers (Jeremy Shamos) to convince the jury that Richard's confession was coerced, while also looking for the real killer. Elsewhere, Marissa, Cable, and Danny try to convince Chunk that he should investigate his upcoming date.
6	6	"Bedside Manner"	Paul Edwards	Dan Dietz	November 15, 2016	107	11.87
Talented surgeon Dr. Terry Robeson (Tom Lipinski) is accused of malpractice when one of his surgeries results in an emergency hysterectomy on a woman who tried for years to get pregnant. Bull and his team must work past the doctor's arrogance to convince the jury that the doctor had no other choice during the disastrous procedure.
7	7	"Never Saw the Sign"	Peter Leto	Mark Goffman & Elizabeth Peterson	November 22, 2016	103	10.87
Bull uncovers a conspiracy involving a corrupt assemblyman (John Ventimiglia) while helping a new client facing vehicular manslaughter charges. Also, Danny and Cable investigate why Marissa is acting and dressing differently.
8	8	"Too Perfect"	Dan Lerner	Teleplay by : Elizabeth Peterson; Story by : Blake Taylor	December 6, 2016	109	11.68
Bull must help his ex-wife Isabella Colón (Yara Martinez), who is also Benny's sister, when a man files a wrongful death suit against her company after his wife died from an allergic reaction to one of her products. Bull must not only prove to the jury that his ex-wife is not as perfect as she seems, but also that the death was not directly due to the product.
9	9	"Light My Fire"	Dennis Smith	David Wilcox	December 13, 2016	108	11.61
When an arson fire in Bull's hometown in New Hampshire results in a man's death, Bull ends up deciding to defend the prime suspect in the fire. The suspect, like Bull himself, comes from a family with a poor reputation in town. The TAC team arrives to help Bull and Benny demonstrate the danger of gossip and prove that family names do not dictate people.
10	10	"E.J."	Brad Turner	Teleplay by : David Hoselton; Story by : Sam McConnell	January 3, 2017	110	11.30
Ginny Bretton (Justine Lupe), the young CEO of a company that was testing software for driverless cars is sued by the widow of an employee killed by the prototype. Bull is hired to defend her and prove to a techno-phobic jury that the car is not a murderer, but he cannot shake the feeling that he is only being told part of the story when Ginny seems to conspire with a suspect.
11	11	"Teacher's Pet"	Holly Dale	Chris Erric Maddox & Indira Gibson Wilson	January 17, 2017	111	11.11
Bull and his team deal with an underage student who is in a romantic relationship with his teacher, and has dropped all contact with his family to be with her. While trying to prove that the relationship became sexual when the boy was underage, Bull and the team learn that the teacher is pregnant, and soon learn that the woman's estranged husband – not the student – is the father of her unborn child. But will that split the duo up?
12	12	"Stockholm Syndrome"	Jet Wilkinson	Teleplay by : Dr. Phillip C. McGraw; Story by : Jesse Stern	January 24, 2017	112	11.17
Following an explosion at TAC headquarters, Bull, the team, and the mirror jurors find themselves being held hostage by a woman who wants TAC's help in freeing her husband from prison. The case becomes more difficult when the woman reveals that Danny was the undercover FBI agent that testified against the man, and she has kept secret how deep she went.
13	13	"The Fall"	Doug Aarniokoski	David Hoselton & Thomas Wong	February 7, 2017	113	10.78
Bull helps disgraced Titanfall multiplayer video-game champion Jace (Omar Maskati) file a suit against his former employer, after the employer publicly accuses Jace of intentionally losing a championship match and fires him. Paired with an attorney who has no time for Bull or his help, the team must try and find an angle to help their client save his future before the attorneys take it from him. But Bull realises that his future in gaming may already be over.
14	14	"It's Classified"	Dennis Smith	Teleplay by : Ashley Gable; Story by : Chamblee Smith	February 14, 2017	114	10.64
Bull comes to the defense of a military intelligence officer who leaked classified documents to stop a colonel who got a hospital full of civilians killed, leaving TAC offline and out of their element. However, Benny finds his lips must be sealed about classified information that could save the client, but his actions land him in hot water.
15	15	"What's Your Number?"	Edward Ornelas	Cole Maliska	February 21, 2017	115	10.66
After a skybridge collapse kills fifteen people, Bull helps prosecute a New York real estate tycoon (and TAC's landlord), only to discover he's a sociopath who will do anything to win, whether it be hiring one of Bull's toughest opponents as his attorney, bribing the mirror jurors, or shutting down the power in TAC. Meanwhile, Benny learns that he is being investigated by the DA's office.
16	16	"Free Fall"	Jan Eliasberg	John A. Norris	March 7, 2017	116	10.39
The Governor of Connecticut takes his senior office staff skydiving and dies when his parachute fails to deploy; the owner of the skydiving company is also killed attempting to save the Governor. Bull offers his services to the skydiving company, now run by the owner's daughter, after they are sued by the Governor's widow. Meanwhile, Bull is challenged by the widow's counsel, occasional trial partner Liberty Davis, while Danny investigates possible sabotage.
17	17	"Name Game"	Laura Belsey	Pamela Wechsler	March 28, 2017	117	10.90
Bull funds a class-action lawsuit pitting thousands of victims against a bank that ran a corrupt pump-and-dump investment division, which puts his business at risk. Unbeknownst to Bull, Benny is being haunted by a trial from his past, which throws him off his game and threatens the success of the suit.
18	18	"Dressed to Kill"	Larry Teng	Ashley Gable	April 4, 2017	119	11.13
The bond between Chunk and Bull is tested when TAC takes on as a client the prime suspect in the death of Chunk's fashion mentor killed during her own show. Meanwhile, Bull rekindles a romance with one of his toughest opponents.
19	19	"Bring It On"	Doug Aarniokoski	Simran Baidwan	April 18, 2017	120	10.32
When the captain of a pro basketball cheerleading squad is killed, her fiancé, popular defense attorney Jules Caffrey, (Isaiah Washington) is charged with her death. Bull's team is brought onto the case and Bull suggests that Caffrey be his own defense attorney, but Caffrey's penchant for courtroom theatrics soon finds him at odds with Bull. Meanwhile, Cable gets suspicious of her new boyfriend.
20	20	"Make Me"	Tricia Brock	Mary Leah Sutton	May 2, 2017	118	10.83
Bull takes the case of a college student who killed his father but cannot remember it. Bull intends to prove temporary insanity due to hypnosis, while Chunk finds himself undercover in the cult the student had joined. Further investigation reveals the student's father was likely not the intended target. Meanwhile, Benny's relationship with Bull turns icy as Benny continues to be haunted by the false imprisonment case from his past.
21	21	"How to Dodge a Bullet"	Russell Fine	Teleplay by : John A. Norris & Glenn Gordon Caron; Story by : John A. Norris	May 9, 2017	121	11.03
Benny is arrested for violating the Brady Act and failing to report a phone call that he received during his investigation and prosecution of the Hayden Watkins case. When the District Attorney's office blindsides him with an additional charge of planting evidence at the Watkins apartment, Benny enters a not guilty plea. Bull enlists the help of a local attorney, J.P. Nunnelly (Eliza Dushku), who is first able to get him a plea deal. When Benny turns the deal down, Bull and Nunnelly team up to secure Benny's freedom. In exchange for her help, Bull agrees to help Nunnelly on three future cases of her choosing.
22	22	"Dirty Little Secrets"	Dennis Smith	Teleplay by : David Hoselton & Glenn Gordon Caron; Story by : David Hoselton	May 16, 2017	122	10.97
After a building explosion is suspected to be a terrorist attack, a massive server company is ordered by the FBI to hand over files that may provide a lead on the attackers. In a case of "privacy versus security", J.P. Nunnelly has Bull consult on the case to help the company fight off the warrant, though the TAC employees are not entirely on the company's side. Meanwhile, Danny is able to discover a major lead in the case the old fashioned way, without using the server data.
23	23	"Benevolent Deception"	Doug Aarniokoski	Mark Goffman	May 23, 2017	123	8.54
Bull is summoned to Miami to consult on another case of J.P. Nunnelly's in which six kilos of heroin are found under the deck of single mother Cecilia Novak's home. Bull has a moral dilemma, suspecting that the woman's brother Leo, who is involved in the drug trade, planted the drugs under her home. Leo, a client of Nunnelly's firm who is paying his sister's legal expenses, adamantly denies involvement and asserts that the drugs belong to a warring cartel. Nunnelly reveals that if she wins this case, she can leave her firm and start her own, and also offers to make this the last case Bull is obligated to consult with her on. Shortly before voir dire begins, cartel violence sweeps the streets, forcing the judge to order an anonymous jury and rendering Bull's team virtually unable to accurately analyze the jurors. Bull ultimately enlists the help of the US government and the presiding judge to pull a bit of showmanship to ensure that Cecilia's life is protected for cooperating with the DEA and that Nunnelly can leave the firm without reprimand for having a client jailed.

=== Season 2 (2017–18) ===
No. overall	No. in season	Title	Directed by	Written by	Original release date	Prod. code	U.S. viewers (millions)
24	1	"School for Scandal"	Vincent Misiano	Glenn Gordon Caron	September 26, 2017	203	10.06
Kara Clayton (Minka Kelly) shoots and kills her billionaire older husband Marcus (Ronald Guttman) after he refuses to revise the terms of their pre-nuptial agreement. Kara is charged with murder despite having three stab wounds and claiming self defense. Diana Lindsay is representing Kara and asks for Bull's help, but he tells her he has already agreed to represent Marcus' interests in the case. After correctly surmising that Kara's wounds were self-inflicted, Bull thinks he has outmaneuvered Diana in finding the perfect juror to serve as foreperson. But he later learns Diana has one-upped him when the perfect juror turns out to be from her home town of Callisto, Texas. To avoid a hung jury, Bull and his team must now find bulletproof evidence to win over the biased juror.
25	2	"Already Gone"	Peter Werner	Veronica West & Sarah Kucserka	October 3, 2017	201	10.79
Bull impulsively agrees to have Benny represent Adam Harris (Sam Vartholomeos), a young man charged with murder for helping his terminally ill girlfriend end her life, and learns that Adam's actions clash with Benny's religious beliefs.
26	3	"A Business of Favors"	Dan Lerner	Pamela Wechsler	October 10, 2017	202	11.26
A young college student asphyxiates on his own vomit and drowns in the Hudson River during a drunken fraternity hazing. Bull wants to help Rebecca Whelan (Deirdre Lovejoy), the mother of the victim, find out what really happened after the other fraternity members concoct a story that they are all sticking to. He and the TAC team help ADA Richard Abernathy (Tyrone Brown) with jury selection and case preparation. However, the jury selection appears to be moot when Judge Hanlon (Susan Blommaert) thinks the case should be thrown out for lack of evidence. Meanwhile, Bull wonders why Marissa is not spending extra hours in the office anymore, and she reveals she has met a man and now has a life outside of work.
27	4	"The Illusion of Control"	Peter Werner	Sarah Haught	October 17, 2017	204	10.49
Bull is sued by famous actress Amaya Andrews (Cara Buono) over advice he gave her regarding an international adoption. Marissa is subpoenaed as a witness for the prosecution, and things become complicated when Bull's lawyer Ron Getman (Brad Garrett) wants to reference Marissa's painful childhood during cross examination, over Bull's objections. Meanwhile, Danny travels to Ethiopia to locate Amaya's adoptive son and try to find a way around that country's parental rights laws.
28	5	"Play the Hand You're Dealt"	Peter Werner	Travis Donnelly	October 24, 2017	205	10.70
Bull receives a call from his old college friend Mack (Nathaniel Arcand), who has been jailed on the Nawakwa Indian reservation. Mack had been thrown out of a casino for being drunk and disorderly, and is now accused of murdering the pit boss who was shot just a few hours later. Bull and the TAC team are handcuffed by tribal court rules, which are different than those of a civilian court, and have to overcome the fact that Mack is almost universally disliked in the small community. Also, Marissa invites Bull to dinner so he can meet her boyfriend, Kyle (Gary Wilmes).
29	6	"The Exception to the Rule"	Dan Lerner	Michael Peterson	October 31, 2017	206	9.63
Bull receives a pitch for help from a 24-year-old lawyer, who turns out to be the son of his former high school sweetheart, Allison (Ali Marsh). Allison has developed kidney cancer, and other people in her town have also become sick due to a local furniture plant contaminating the water. Rather than accept the company's meager settlement, which will not even cover medical expenses or rerouting piping for the town's wells to a clean water supply, Bull convinces the plaintiffs to go to court.
30	7	"No Good Deed"	Laura Belsey	Pamela Wechsler	November 7, 2017	207	10.77
Bull and the TAC team try to help young teacher Lacey Adams (Samantha Marie Ware), who has been jailed for changing answers on a standardized test. While the school district finds over 800 tests that have been altered, Lacey insists she only changed one answer on one test, in order to help a formerly troubled student who has turned his life around get into a local college. Lacey is offered a deal which would cause her to rat out other faculty members and would still result in getting a felony on her record, so she takes Bull's advice to go to court. Despite TAC's help, Lacey's lawyer loses the case, forcing Bull to help Lacey in a different way. Meanwhile, Marissa catches Kyle going through some of her personal things, including financial information. Kyle claims he is only looking out for Marissa's future.
31	8	"The Devil, The Detail"	Alex Pillai	Hannah Park	November 14, 2017	208	10.34
The TAC office receives a food delivery from Simon (Chris Cafero), a former employee as well as Cable's one-time boyfriend who left both TAC and Cable with no explanation. After Cable angrily confronts him, Simon commits suicide hours later. Cable learns that Simon was participating in a drug trial for an antidepressant, and she asks Bull to help Simon's parents with a civil suit. The case pits Bull against Arti Cander (Archie Panjabi), a fellow trial science expert who proves to be a more than worthy adversary.
32	9	"Thanksgiving"	Leslie Libman	Marissa Matteo	November 21, 2017	209	8.98
As Thanksgiving approaches, Bull releases his team to enjoy the holiday with their families, only to find himself working a case solo when he agrees to help a champion boxer who is being tried for murder. Also, Chunk makes a major personal decision at his family's Thanksgiving dinner, while Marissa's dinner with Kyle is abruptly cancelled when he is mugged. Marissa later learns that all of her credit cards have been maxed out.
33	10	"Home for the Holidays"	Mike Smith	Veronica West & Sarah Kucserka	December 12, 2017	210	10.86
Bull takes on a case of competing cell phone companies, representing the company making the cheaper of the two phones which is being sued for crossover technology. He charges triple TAC's usual fee with the caveat that the case must be wrapped up before Christmas, which is only five days away. Upon returning to his office, Bull meets a nine-year-old girl who wants to be emancipated from her parents. Bull dismisses her because she is too young, but later learns of her family situation and gets caught up helping the girl, at the expense of the phone case. Meanwhile, Marissa reluctantly enlists the help of Cable and Danny to look into Kyle, learning that he is really a con man named Robert Allen.
34	11	"Survival Instincts"	Dennis Smith	Pamela Weschler	January 2, 2018	211	11.17
Bull and the TAC team help defend Jemma Whitbeck (Chloe Levine) in a high-profile case after Bull learns that his old friend Thalia Macera (Nadia Dajani) is the girl's attorney. Eighteen months ago, 16-year-old Jemma ran off with an older man named Ryan (Johnathan Tchaikovsky) that she met online, and is now accused of helping Ryan in the recent armed robbery of a jewelry store. Based on Jemma's demeanor, Bull is convinced that Ryan held her against her will, and that she was in survival mode when robbing the store.
35	12	"Grey Areas"	Vincent Misiano	Sarah Haught	January 9, 2018	212	10.50
The TAC team helps Bull defend his former colleague, psychotherapist Donovan Benanti (C.J. Wilson), who is accused of malpractice when one of his patients commits a double-murder/suicide. Bull faces a moral and legal dilemma when Benanti reveals additional damning information about his sessions with the patient, as the conversations fall under attorney-client privilege.
36	13	"Kill Shot"	Aaron Lipstadt	Veronica West & Sarah Kuscerka	January 23, 2018	213	11.08
Bull and the team have to overcome several obstacles to defend Rebecca Lexington (Stephanie Kurtzuba) in the shooting death of her wealthy husband, Jeremy: the alleged home invasion appears to have been staged, Jeremy had gambled away most of the family's liquid assets, Rebecca is seen as a golddigger in the Greenwich community, and, most glaringly, Jeremy took out a $25 million life insurance policy on himself shortly before the shooting.
37	14	"Keep Your Friends Close"	Ed Ornelas	Travis Donnelly	February 6, 2018	214	10.90
A hacker named Malcolm is arrested by the FBI for breaching air traffic control computers at LaGuardia Airport. Malcolm's pregnant girlfriend Sarah approaches her old college roommate Cable after learning that TAC is helping the prosecution. Cable tells Bull about the meeting, and Bull forbids her to speak with Sarah. Sarah later intercepts Cable, claiming her boyfriend is innocent and pleading with Cable to look at the digital signature, which will prove it. When Cable does so, the flash drive she received infects the FAA servers with a virus that deletes everything including the evidence against Malcolm. When Danny asks an old contact from the FBI for a favor, the FBI arrests Cable, intending to charge her for a federal crime of evidence tampering. The case gets thrown out because the government has no evidence, and therefore no case, against Malcolm. Bull, having found the true motive behind the hacking, helps the FBI file new charges against Malcolm, in exchange for the FBI dropping charges against Cable. Cable is let out of jail, but Bull is reluctantly forced to fire her for breaking the law.
38	15	"Witness for the Prosecution"	Alex Pillai	Marissa Matteo	February 27, 2018	215	10.70
A seemingly crazy woman shoots and kills a police officer as he sits in his patrol car, after he refuses to continue helping her protect her drug dealing operation. The DA contacts Bull and identifies the woman as Hazel Diaz (Roma Maffia), stating the woman has been declared mentally incompetent to stand trial seven previous times by feigning Schizophrenia, spending only a brief time in a treatment facility each time. The DA asks Bull to prove the woman sane and finally get her convicted. Meanwhile, as TAC reluctantly looks for Cable's replacement in the organization after Bull is adamant against hiring her back, Cable completes a very positive interview for a job, until the hiring rep mentions that a background check will be done.
39	16	"Absolution"	Aaron Lipstadt	Pamela Wechsler	March 6, 2018	216	10.11
Bull helps exonerate Derrick Graham (Adam David Thompson), who has spent the last nine years in prison for murdering a woman he met in a bar while celebrating a promotion with his work friends. The case is personal, as Bull worked on Graham's defense back then and always believed him to be innocent. Bull gets the TAC team to help, though they are quick to point out areas where Cable would be a big help. Meanwhile, Chunk continues to try to get his estranged daughter to talk to him.
40	17	"Gag Order"	Nina Lopez-Corrado	Sarah Haught	March 13, 2018	217	10.64
Chunk's daughter Anna arrives in town to visit Chunk, get some answers from him, scout colleges, and visit her potential journalism professor Chloe Talbott (Nikki M. James). Chloe is unable to make the appointment, having just been arrested for breaking into dating app Spark4U's headquarters. Chloe then seeks TAC's help so she can expose the app for covering up rapes by Spark4U clients using fake profiles. However, she cannot reveal her source as it is anonymous, so the team are forced to use Cable's replacement, Isaiah, to track down the messages exchanged. Unable to figure it out, Isaiah locates Cable and asks for her help. She agrees on the condition that he does not tell Bull. Bull deduces that Cable helped, and as gratitude, offers her job back at TAC, which she accepts.
41	18	"Bad Medicine"	Bethany Rooney	Erica Peterson	March 27, 2018	218	10.65
A Virginia doctor is caught with a large quantity of CBD oil, an extract of cannabis used to treat nausea and pain caused by some illnesses. Though she purchased it legally in New York, it is illegal in her home state. The doctor's mother begs Benny for his help. Benny and Bull go to meet with the District Attorney, but are surprised to find the case has been taken over by a zealous Federal prosecutor (Dana Delany). The defense learns that the doctor initially obtained the oil for her son, who has Leukemia. After seeing how significantly it helped him, the doctor made it available for some of her other suffering patients. As Bull and his team prepare for this new development, the prosecutor leaks information to Child Protective Services that leads to the son being forcibly hospitalized. The son's new doctor concludes that CBD was the best available treatment, and Bull gets him to testify to this in court. Bull then has Benny craft a unique closing argument based on the concepts of personal opinions, conflicting state laws, and how each juror's opinion matters.
42	19	"A Redemption"	Alrick Riley	Hannah Park	April 3, 2018	219	11.02
Authorities catch up with George Brown 18 years after he was the driver while his older brother robbed a check cashing store and killed the clerk. Brown is now living as Jim Grayson, a restaurant owner and married father of three. Bull and the team must convince the jury that not only is Brown living an exemplary life, but also that he was unaware of his brother's intentions that fateful night. A clue discovered by Danny helps save the case by revealing that the crime was an inside job and the clerk's death was accidental.
43	20	"Justified"	Dennis Smith	Chamblee Smith	April 17, 2018	220	10.83
Kate Martin, an abused wife, shoots her English professor husband in the back while he sleeps. Bull's old friend from a battered women's clinic convinces him to help on the case, which is not difficult given that Bull's late sister was also an abuse victim. Bull opts for an all-or-nothing defense, Murder 1 or acquittal, with no lesser charges being considered. Bull is convinced that, although her husband was sleeping at the time she killed him, Kate felt her life and that of her unborn child threatened on a daily basis. This becomes difficult to prove, given that Kate rarely told anyone about the abuse and made only one trip to the emergency room, where she checked in under a false name. Danny and Cable are finally able to locate a teaching assistant that the husband cheated with. While the young woman was not abused herself, she did listen from another room as the husband fought with Kate and made threats. Elsewhere, Chunk confronts one of his law school professors who failed him in a class, convinced it was due to bias.
44	21	"Reckless"	Vincent Misiano	Glenn Gordon Caron & Veronica West & Sarah Kuscerka	May 1, 2018	221	10.37
After receiving news that his ex-wife Izzy (Benny's sister) is getting remarried, Bull takes to drinking heavily and gets arrested for public mischief. While in jail awaiting bail, Bull meets a mute man who is kind to him. Bull then learns after being released that the man is Elliott Miles, the prime suspect in a rape-murder-arson case. Bull takes Miles' risky case, and begins annoying his team with his tunnel vision. He ignores Marissa's advice on a juror, and later makes trial decisions without consulting Benny. Benny is able to refute one eyewitness's testimony, but the prosecution then brings in Elliott's pseudo-girlfriend to testify that he came home later than she originally told police. Though it is revealed the prosecution made a deal with the girlfriend, the judge refuses to call for a mistrial. Bull tells Benny and Chunk he needs a drink, ending the episode on a cliffhanger.
45	22	"Death Sentence"	Vincent Misiano	Glenn Gordon Caron & Veronica West & Sarah Kuscerka	May 8, 2018	222	11.76
Bull is awakened by Marissa on his office couch after a night of drinking, wherein he has dreamed about Izzy taking him back. Marissa visits a therapist about her possible co-dependency relationship with Bull. Elliott Miles is convicted of murder and faces a possible death sentence. New evidence arises that points to the crime being committed by a serial killer, causing Benny to try and sneak it in during the sentencing hearings without being held in contempt. Chunk reluctantly asks the law professor that failed him to testify that Miles does not fit the profile of the killer. After Danny and Cable do some legwork to narrow down the list of people who are likely the serial killer, Bull visits the prime suspect's wife, surmising she already knows the things her husband has done. The next day in court, an FBI agent visits the prosecutor's table, and the prosecutor then asks the judge that all charges against Miles be dropped. A relieved but exhausted Bull walks outside and lays down on the courthouse steps. He dials 9-1-1 and says he thinks he is having a heart attack.

=== Season 3 (2018–19) ===
No. overall	No. in season	Title	Directed by	Written by	Original release date	Prod. code	U.S. viewers (millions)
46	1	"The Ground Beneath Their Feet"	Bethany Rooney	Glenn Gordon Caron	September 24, 2018	301	7.33
Returning from rehabilitation for his heart attack and alcoholism, Bull presents the TAC team with the case of Julia Summerfield, a dying mother whose liver transplant funding has been denied by her insurance carrier. In a shocker, Bull announces that TAC will be representing the insurance company, stating he met the company's CEO in rehab and was offered a $2 million per month retainer. Meanwhile, the TAC team receives devastating news about Cable, who has not shown up for work.
47	2	"Jury Duty"	Aaron Lipstadt	Pamela Wechsler	October 1, 2018	302	6.74
Despite his best efforts to get thrown out, Bull is selected to serve on a jury for a case of a man who has been practicing law without a license. This interferes with TAC's case defending a mother who shot and killed her daughter's rapist/murderer in broad daylight, forcing Benny, Chunk and Marissa to do their best without Bull's help. The case ultimately hinges on getting testimony from the mother's older daughter, who has been deeply damaged by the incident. Meanwhile, the TAC team mourns the death of Cable in a bridge collapse.
48	3	"Excessive Force"	Russell Fine	Nichole Millard & Kathryn Price	October 8, 2018	303	6.52
TAC represents the City of New York, which is being sued for $25 million after a drunk but unarmed black man is shot in the arm by a white female police officer upon barging into the women's bathroom to throw up. Body cam video shows the officer picking up the gun, followed by a struggle in which the man grabs the barrel. Bull implores his team to make the case about circumstances, not race. After the officer cracks under cross examination and makes a damning admission, a loss seems likely. But upon further review of the evidence, Bull sees a previously overlooked detail that turns the case in a completely different direction.
49	4	"Justice for Cable"	Randy Zisk	Bill Chais	October 15, 2018	304	6.48
When the bridge collapse is revealed to be connected to terrorism, Bull seeks justice for Cable's mother and the other families that lost loved ones by going after the bank that he believes knowingly funded an international terrorist. He is assisted on the case by Taylor Rentzel (Mackenzie Meehan), a cyber expert who is Marissa's old colleague from Homeland Security. After a successful ruling for the plaintiffs, Bull offers Taylor a full-time job at TAC.
50	5	"The Missing Piece"	Stacey K. Black	Veronica West & Sarah Kucserka	October 22, 2018	305	6.76
TAC helps defend a doctor who is accused of murdering a heroin dealer based on DNA evidence at the scene, but the man insists he was never there. Complicating the case, the doctor fully admits he was once addicted to opioid pain killers, having later quit cold turkey. Just when it appears that TAC will have to try and make a deal with the prosecution, Marissa and Taylor team up to make a startling discovery.
51	6	"Fool Me Twice"	Mike Smith	Sarah H. Haught	October 29, 2018	306	7.23
After Marissa's husband, Greg, is accused of starting a fire at his own restaurant for insurance money, Marissa has some doubts about his innocence based on a couple of circumstances. Even though Bull and the TAC team start to uncover evidence that points to another party, the damage to Marissa and Greg's relationship may already be done.
52	7	"A Girl Without Feelings"	Mary Lou Belli	Chamblee Smith	November 5, 2018	307	6.43
Bull assists Tally North (Quinn Shephard), a young woman who is a clinical sociopath and a former patient, when she is accused of killing her brother after an argument at a party. Tally woke up with no recollection of the incident, so TAC initially aims for a plea of not guilty by reason of insanity. However, when evidence is presented showing that the killer may have had some regret, Bull wants to change the plea to not guilty as he knows Tally is incapable of such feelings.
53	8	"But for the Grace"	Dennis Smith	Pamela Wechsler	November 12, 2018	308	6.50
Chris Coleman (Michael Drayer) defends himself and his wife during a scuffle in a Black Friday store line, shoving his attacker to the ground and causing the man to hit his head. A police officer arriving late to the scene arrests Coleman, who is then advised by a public defender to plead out to simple assault and pay a small fine so he can avoid jail time. This becomes a problem when the shoving victim later goes into a coma and dies. Benny asks Bull to take the case pro bono, and Bull does so after encountering a cocky young ADA who insists on prosecuting Coleman for manslaughter. Armed with Coleman's plea and the victim's three friends as witnesses, the prosecution seems to have the upper hand. After a discovery, Bull turns the tables by having Benny put the ADA himself on the stand to question his motives. Elsewhere, Danny learns a secret about the man she is dating.
54	9	"Separation"	Kevin Berlandi	Travis Donnelly	December 3, 2018	309	6.59
Bull is hired by a wealthy businessman to help him reacquire a $10 million painting that his ex-wife, a now-deceased famous artist, had previously willed to a museum. The man claims that he and his ex had reconciled and made plans to marry again, and that she had promised to get the painting back. Meanwhile, Danny learns that Gabriel, her new love interest, is a former surgeon who is in the USA illegally, so she tries to convince a judge to keep him in the country.
55	10	"A Higher Law"	Carl Seaton	Steven Martinez	December 10, 2018	310	7.37
A priest is stopped and arrested while driving his church van a couple hours after the vehicle was involved in a fatal hit-and-run. Bull takes on the priest as a client after the man claims he was not driving when the accident occurred. The priest says the person driving the van confessed to him, so he is bound by his faith to not identify the suspect. Even after the judge rules that the driver's confession was outside the bounds of church confidentiality, the priest still refuses to name the guilty party, forcing Bull and the team to try and deduce the parishioner who was driving and appeal to his sense of morality.
56	11	"Separate Together"	Dan Lerner	Bill Chais	January 14, 2019	311	7.09
Diana Lindsay returns to town when her niece Claire and Claire's new husband are accused of committing armed robbery at the jewellery store where Claire works. Bull agrees to have TAC work for both clients, with Diana acting as her niece's defence lawyer, and Benny defending the husband. Meanwhile, Bull hesitates to tell Diana about his heart attack and ongoing recovery from alcoholism, and the two are seen drinking and dancing at a nightclub together.
57	12	"Split Hairs"	Bethany Rooney	Sam McConnell	January 21, 2019	312	6.70
A well-known medical examiner finds herself arrested and jailed after being accused of planting evidence nine years ago in a serial murder case. The lawyer defending the murderer claims DNA tests of a hair the M.E. found in a victim exonerates his client. Bull and the team, realizing that an overturned verdict would call into question every other case the M.E. worked on, start looking into the lawyer's motives. Meanwhile, Bull and Diana Lindsay attempt a long-distance relationship.
58	13	"Prior Bad Acts"	Dan Lerner	Nichole Millard & Kathryn Price	February 4, 2019	313	6.34
Bull's new relationship with Diana, his on-again romantic rival, is complicated by his renewed feelings for his ex-wife, Izzy, when they are reunited by the sudden death of her and Benny's father. Also, a deceased tech billionaire's brother comes to TAC for help in bringing suit against the doctor he holds personally responsible for the tycoon's death. But the TAC team soon learns that the deceased man was murdered, and the doctor is not at fault.
59	14	"Leave It All Behind"	Mike Smith	Sarah H. Haught	February 11, 2019	314	6.25
Bull's old college classmate, now a wealthy man in the finance business, becomes the prime suspect in the disappearance of his wife. The wife, a famous author, frequently spends weeks away from her husband to focus on her writing, leading to the couple having an open relationship. The pressure on TAC escalates when the jury is sequestered and the wife's dead body is discovered, making it a murder case. A clue that Danny discovers about how the dead body was dragged to its ultimate location helps lead the team to another suspect.
60	15	"Security Fraud"	Jono Oliver	Marissa Matteo	February 18, 2019	315	6.80
When a man in witness protection is shot to death in an upstate New York tollbooth, Bull helps his idol, attorney Walter Franklin (Dan Ziskie), bring suit against the U.S. government on behalf of the man's family. Things become difficult when Franklin goes against Bull's advice more than once, leading Bull to believe Walter is in the early stages of Alzheimer's.
61	16	"Forfeiture"	Alex Pillai	Pamela Wechsler	February 25, 2019	316	6.72
Chunk has his first case as a public defender, representing Darius Lambert (Brian Bradley) who is being prosecuted by the FBI for copyright infringement due to selling known counterfeit knock-offs from the back of his grandfather's barbershop. Benny soon represents the grandfather (Ben Vereen) when the FBI accuses him of knowing about the operation and wants to seize his shop. Chunk's zealousness in wanting to win his first case becomes an issue when it complicates Benny's case.
62	17	"Parental Guidance"	Dennis Smith	Travis Donnelly	March 18, 2019	317	6.41
16-year old Lucas Schweiger (CJ Valleroy) is on trial for his part in a shootout at his father's cabin that killed a woman from child services and injured a state trooper. The father, a self-proclaimed "survivalist" suffering from extreme paranoia, was killed in the exchange of gunfire. Bull has to prove that Lucas did not know right from wrong, due to having no other people in his life for ten years besides his father, who preached a "kill or be killed" mentality. But there is a twist: a few years ago, Lucas was briefly separated from his father for three weeks, and taken in by a Christian Foster family. Elsewhere, Marissa and Greg discuss having children.
63	18	"Don't Say a Word"	Alex Pillai	Nichole Millard & Kathryn Price	April 1, 2019	318	6.78
After a father and client of Diana Lindsay's is acquitted of murdering his wife, Diana contacts Bull to have TAC represent the client's in-laws in a custody case. Knowing her client was guilty and is a threat to the children, Diana does not want him to gain custody. Due to privilege, Bull cannot reveal his relationship with Diana and she refuses to give up any damning information on her client. But their relationship is found out, putting the case in jeopardy. Just when all hope is about to be lost, one of Taylor's previously unknown skills saves the day.
64	19	"Bounty"	Tessa Blake	Bill Chais	April 15, 2019	319	6.66
Bull and TAC defend Danny's old colleague Trent Bolton, an FBI agent-turned-bounty hunter who faces a litany of charges for pistol-whipping a bail jumper and throwing him in the trunk of a car, only to learn from the bail bondsman that he got the wrong guy. Bull and Benny face an uphill battle against an eager, young ADA when the victim is revealed to be an NYC firefighter. Review of some hospital footage, which shows the victim coming-to and walking out moments after Trent dropped him off, leads TAC to question the guy's story about being badly hurt. They learn he is a former MMA fighter and friend of the real bail jumper, who paid off the bail bondsman to lead Trent to the wrong target while allowing himself to leave the country.
65	20	"The Good One"	Dennis Smith	Travis Donnelly & Steven Martinez	April 29, 2019	320	6.45
A federal judge who is about to hear a case against a crime boss is killed by the boss's son, Brendan, who then jumps in his brother Connor's car, holds a gun to his head, and orders him to drive away. Connor, a first-year medical resident who has shunned his father's business, is arrested for aiding Brendan but swears he was only there to try and stop him. Bull meets with the kids' mother, who insists that Bull do all he can to save her "good son", even if it means Brendan getting the death penalty. A witness eventually comes forward to corroborate Connor's story, but Marissa tells Bull the jury appears unmoved. Further, TAC learns that Brendan made a deal with the prosecution to avoid the death penalty in exchange for testifying against Connor. Brendan is killed in jail and cannot testify, so Bull decides to put the father on the stand. The father vehemently testifies that Connor would not hurt anyone. Bull later confronts the mother, certain that she put the hit out on her "bad son" to save Connor, but she will not admit it and Bull lets her go.
66	21	"When the Rains Came"	Bethany Rooney	Sarah H. Haught & Chamblee Smith	May 6, 2019	321	6.21
During a hurricane that hits Long Island, two inmates at a private prison are killed when their cell becomes flooded. The last guard to leave during the storm, who happens to be Taylor's brother-in-law, is accused of murder for abandoning the prison. Bull wants to defend the guard on the grounds that he did not expect the prison's backup systems to fail, while also having a more pressing crisis at home: having to rescue his pregnant wife and child after a tree fell on their house. The case becomes complicated when Taylor learns her sister and nephew actually made it safely to a hotel, while her brother-in-law really came home to save $50,000 of ill-gotten cash that he earned in some prison schemes.
67	22	"Pillar of Salt"	Glenn Gordon Caron	Nichole Millard & Kathryn Price & Glenn Gordon Caron	May 13, 2019	322	7.19
A woman is accused of killing her three-year old stepdaughter, after it is determined the girl died from ingesting a lethal amount of salt. The prosecution tries to paint a picture of a stepmom who became overwhelmed and frustrated with the three-year old after having her own son. It is later determined, and reluctantly corroborated by the birth mother's testimony, that the girl suffered from Pica, a rare disorder that causes cravings for non-nutritive substances. During the trial, Benny learns that Izzy's tryst with Bull caused the collapse of her second marriage. He angrily attacks Bull, stating that after the current trial, he is done with Bull and TAC. Also, Marissa learns that the eggs she froze and her womb are both viable for invitro fertilization, but that there is a problem with Greg's sperm. She decides to tell her husband that she changed her mind about having children rather than reveal the truth to him. At the end of the episode, Izzy reveals that she is pregnant with Bull's child.

=== Season 4 (2019–20) ===
No. overall	No. in season	Title	Directed by	Written by	Original release date	Prod. code	U.S. viewers (millions)
68	1	"Labor Days"	Bethany Rooney	Glenn Gordon Caron	September 23, 2019	401	6.42
On New Year's Eve 2017, a young woman reluctantly serves a lone man at the bar his sixth shot of tequila, after which he goes to a home where his ex-wife and four of their friends are partying and shoots them all. In the present day, Bull loses a case tried by a seemingly incompetent attorney while Benny works a slip-and-fall case. Bull pleads with Benny to come back, but to no avail. Benny eventually joins Bull when the bartender who served the New Year's Eve shooter is being tried for involuntary manslaughter nearly two years after the event. Benny convinces the TAC team that he can make the case that alcohol didn't cause the shooting, rather, it had been planned well beforehand. Despite the team's best efforts, the jury is deadlocked for several days. A flash-forward, showing Bull and Izzy's pregnant daughter discussing the case that brought her father and uncle back together, reveals that there was a mistrial due to a hung jury, but the prosecutor chose to drop the charges. Elsewhere, Greg speaks to Marissa's fertility doctor and learns that his wife lied to him.
69	2	"Fantastica Voyage"	Michael Weatherly	Pamela Wechsler	September 30, 2019	402	5.90
A whistleblower causes entrepreneur Whitney Holland (Elizabeth Alderfer) to be charged with defrauding investors by promising them her water desalination technology can handle volumes that are not possible. Bull agrees to take her case amid protests from the TAC team, especially Benny. Bull feels they can make the case that despite lying about her backstory and other things, Whitney truly believes her technology will eventually be viable. The trial results in only one juror siding with Whitney, which is enough to cause a mistrial. Bull tells the judge that the TAC team is tied up for the next seven months, giving Whitney and her company extra time to fully develop the technology before a retrial. Meanwhile, Chunk is proud of his daughter when she is chosen out of 1500 applicants for a journalism study-abroad program in Jordan, but he grows concerned when she appears to be avoiding him.
70	3	"Rectify"	Kevin Berlandi	Kathryn Price & Nichole Millard	October 7, 2019	403	6.12
Chunk's legal clinic scores a new trial for Eddie Mitchell (Malcolm Goodwin), who was convicted of triple murder in 2002 when he was a 16-year old low-level drug dealer. Another dealer and a pregnant woman were killed in the incident. Although he worked the original case for the prosecution as second chair, Benny starts to believe the conviction was wrong after interviewing the detective who used the same witness, a now-deceased prostitute, in four other murder cases. The case ultimately turns on the TAC team discovering through Taylor's enhanced forensics that the pregnant woman, thought to be an innocent bystander, may have been the target. Elsewhere, Marissa meets with her therapist and explains how Greg has suddenly become cold toward her, and Chunk finally makes contact with his daughter.
71	4	"Her Own Two Feet"	Dan Lerner	Sarah H. Haught	October 14, 2019	404	5.83
Sadie Williams (Krys Marshall), a young cosmetics entrepreneur who is famous for appearing in her own social media ads, is upset when her father, Gerald (Rob Morgan), wants to sell the company to a global conglomerate. Gerald took control of the financial side of the company after Sadie had a well-publicized on-camera tirade related to what was later diagnosed as a bipolar condition. Sadie hires TAC to stop the sale, and initial evidence shows that Gerald did some shady things with his daughter's money. However, when Gerald's motives become clear, Bull and the team have to rethink their strategy. Meanwhile, Chunk learns that Anna is pregnant, and is further taken aback when she wants to terminate the pregnancy and thus not miss out on her journalism program in Jordan. Also, Marissa confides to Bull that her marriage to Greg is likely over.
72	5	"Billboard Justice"	Aaron Lipstadt	Travis Donnelly	October 21, 2019	405	6.15
Taylor becomes obsessed with helping Jessica Lee, a dancer at a gentleman's club who claims she was raped by real estate mogul Nathan Alexander in one of the club's private rooms. Even after learning that TAC is courting Alexander as a client, Taylor is not deterred, causing Bull to be furious when she deliberately exposes Benny to Lee before he meets with Alexander. Bull eventually sees things Taylor's way, and takes up Lee's case. The case proves difficult, as there is no video evidence, no physical evidence (Lee waited three days to report the incident to police), and Alexander has paid off all the previous victims that Danny can find. Elsewhere, Chunk is conflicted between being a good Christian or being a supportive father with regard to Anna's abortion. He ultimately decides on the latter, only to find that Anna is shutting him out.
73	6	"Into the Mystic"	Dennis Smith	Marissa Matteo	October 28, 2019	406	6.66
Rachel Elliot, a high-powered CEO known for her tenacity, wakes up hungover on her and husband Peter's boat, finding bruises on her arms, blood on the boat, and Peter missing. After he turns up dead and she is accused of murdering him while drunk, Rachel hires TAC to defend her. The team grow concerned when they find evidence that Rachel has been acting emotionless and out of character, including going to work the day she reported Peter missing and suffering from lapses of memory. It is revealed Rachel has early-onset Alzheimer's disease, which triggered her memory loss and abnormal behaviour. The team finds previously overlooked evidence and a witness who testifies that Peter tried to kill Rachel by suffocating her, and she killed him in self-defense. After she is found not guilty, Rachel, on Bull's request, resigns from her company and donates a substantial amount of her fortune toward Alzheimer's research. Meanwhile, Chunk continues to try to reconcile with Anna, sitting outside her dorm room for several hours. He manages to win her over by stating that while he may not be able to change her mind about her abortion, he will support her decision.
74	7	"Doctor Killer"	Valerie Weiss	Larry Kaplow	November 4, 2019	407	5.73
Bull has a difficult time defending a client who has confessed to accidentally killing the doctor who tried an experimental treatment on his sister, only to later learn that the treatment had never been tested on humans. It turns out the client is covering for his sister's son, who followed the doctor down a street and pushed him into a chain-link fence. The fence's gate was left unlocked, and the doctor plunged into a construction pit to his death. With the son now on trial, the prosecution tries to paint him as aggressive and having no remorse, leaving Chunk to work overtime preparing the teen. Meanwhile, Taylor does some digging and learns the doctor had been given a $500,000 advance from the pharma company to test the treatment on a human, and was only a week away from having to pay back the money due to the contract expiring.
75	8	"Safe and Sound"	Glenn Gordon Caron	Pamela Wechsler	November 18, 2019	408	5.78
13-year-old Charlie Crawford convinces his older brother Theo to let him handle their father's handgun. When several clicks indicate the gun seems empty, Theo leaves the room. When Theo returns, Charlie aims and fires, killing his brother. The prosecution chooses to charge the father Eric, Bull's friend from college, with negligent homicide after he admits he gave the gun safe combination to 17-year old Theo. Eric says he frequently visited a shooting range with Theo and taught him safety, but video from their last visit reveals Eric did not check that the gun was empty on the way out. Eric swears on the stand that he fired six shots and the gun was empty. Meanwhile, Bull deduces from hearing Charlie's 9-1-1 call and interviewing him that Charlie is likely a sociopath and incapable of empathy. After confirming attorney-client privilege, Charlie admits to Bull that he put the bullet in the gun. However, Bull and Benny share this with the prosecution to get Eric's charges dropped, stating Charlie committed perjury earlier in the trial which voids privilege. Charlie is charged with murdering his brother.
76	9	"The Flying Carpet"	Anne Hamilton	Chamblee Smith	November 25, 2019	409	6.03
A teenager, encouraged by his friends, climbs to the roof of The Flying Carpet pizzeria to take a selfie with a giant concrete pizza slice, only to have the concrete give way, causing the boy to fall to the sidewalk beneath. The now-paralyzed boy's family sues the restaurant owners, who subsequently ask their liability insurance company to settle. TAC represents the insurance company after it becomes clear the boy jumped a locked fence and ignored no trespassing signs before making his climb. The plaintiff argues that the restaurant was holding a weekly contest for patrons to take a selfie with the restaurant prominently featured, and they encouraged unique and original photos. Before the case is final, the insurance company pulls out, declaring the policy null and void due to a technicality and leaving the mom-and-pop owners liable for damages. Bull finds a way to pressure the insurance rep into settling with the boy's family while protecting the restaurant owners.
77	10	"Imminent Danger"	Mary Lou Belli	Kathryn Price & Nichole Millard	December 16, 2019	410	6.42
After being stalked by her ex-boyfriend, both online and in-person, a woman encounters the man in her home and shoots him to death as he retreats down the steps. She is arrested for murder. Bull takes the case pro bono, believing TAC can make the case that the woman was harassed so much by the ex, she truly believed he was an imminent threat. The trial judge openly dislikes Bull due to a previous case, and forbids him from being in the courtroom. This forces Bull and Marissa to switch places. During the trial, the state tries to prove that the woman was actually the stalker. Taylor finds the man's cell phone and computers to be strangely clean, but after she and Danny find a hidden passage to the man's basement, they discover a high-tech gadget used to block outgoing signals. This turns the case in favor of the defense. Meanwhile, Taylor fears she is being ghosted by a man she recently dated.
78	11	"Look Back in Anger"	Tessa Blake	Sarah H. Haught	January 6, 2020	411	6.19
Marissa's friend Stephen (Aaron Dean Eisenberg), whose younger brother has just committed suicide, wants to sue notable philanthropic businessman Peter Maybrook (Kevin Kilner) for abusing that brother in the early 1990s when he was a child. While New York has passed a law removing the statute of limitations on sexual abuse cases during a certain window, Bull and Benny say they cannot sue on behalf of the deceased. Stephen then reveals that he also was abused by Maybrook two years before his brother, and proposes to sue the billionaire himself. Bull looks to select jurors who can empathize with an individual's need for personal privacy, but the trial ultimately turns on evidence from digital cameras that the brother stole from the defendant.
79	12	"Behind the Ivy"	Alex Pillai	Steven Paul Martinez	January 20, 2020	412	6.05
Chunk's friend Reggie from his private high school days, who is now a counselor, asks if Chunk can meet with the parents of Antonio Garcia, a 16-year old who collapsed and died while training to make weight for a wrestling match. When Bull and Benny go to see them, the parents decide to reject a $500,000 settlement and sue the school and coach for wrongful death, mainly because the mother wants to know why her son died. The defense points to enrollment paperwork and contends that Antonio's parents failed to disclose a heart condition he had as an infant, but the mother contends that doctors told them the condition was gone by the time Antonio was five years old. Knowing the defense paid a medical expert well known for appearing in court cases, Bull and the team look for any occasions where she testified that an infant mitral valve condition cannot cause a heart attack in teens. However, the expert crosses them up by testifying she found evidence that Antonio was taking amphetamines before his death. Chunk finds an email trail leading him to discover that Antonio confided with Reggie about his amphetamine use. Reggie says Antonio did not want him to reveal his secret, but then says he did tell one person: Antonio's coach.
80	13	"Child of Mine"	Dennis Smith	Marissa Matteo	February 3, 2020	413	6.47
A white couple is left confused after the wife gives birth to a brown baby. The wife, an old friend of Taylor's, requests TAC's help, as the fertility clinic they used made a mistake with the sperm. Bull rejects the $40,000 settlement offer from the clinic and negotiates for $1,000,000 for the couple, but they soon learn that the black man whose sample the clinic used is requesting custody of his biological son for him and his wife. In court, Benny states that the wealthy black couple work long hours and have been looking for nannies, while the black couple's lawyer points out that the white husband attends therapy weekly to seek help from his abusive childhood. When divorce papers the white wife filed a year prior come to light, she defends herself saying she was suffering from hormones and mood swings during her pregnancy, while the opposing lawyer interjects that the wife had dropped the divorce solely upon learning of her pregnancy. Finally, Danny researches the black couple and finds out that the black wife is in remission from cancer. A compassionate Bull comes up with a solution: the white wife gives one of her eggs to the black couple for their fertility treatment in exchange for both couples being given visitation time with each other's children.
81	14	"Quid Pro Quo"	Bethany Rooney	Pamela Wechsler	February 10, 2020	414	6.31
Dr. Samir Shadid, a successful heart surgeon who has saved numerous lives, is arrested and accused of knowing that his father paid a large sum to get him admitted to an exclusive university over ten years ago. Bull looks for jurors who believe in second chances, but the TAC team is forced to use their last available discretionary pick to choose between two jurors they don't want. Samir claims he was unaware of what his now-deceased father did. The middleman (actually a woman) who worked with the corrupt admissions officer claims Samir was present when his father made the payment, but Samir's mother swears on the stand that her son had no idea. During the trial, Bull is forced to leave when an overdue Izzy has pains, but it is false labor. The TAC team learns of a bribe being paid to a juror, which turns out to be from a lawyer who had also been accused of paying the same middleman and has an interest in the outcome. Bull shares this information with the prosecutor, and encourages her to drop the current case. As the court case closes, Izzy goes into labor for real, and gives birth to a daughter.
82	15	"Flesh and Blood"	John Aronson	Kathryn Price & Nichole Millard	February 17, 2020	415	6.22
Vivian Cahill (Anna Wood), an old college friend of Bull, is accused of murdering her verbally-abusive father, Terrence, in their home. Bull accepts the case, but complications arise when Benny suffers from a bursted appendix during the early stages of the trial. Chunk stands in as Vivian's legal representative with Benny serving as his remote supervisor. The TAC team learn through their investigation that the culprit was not a debt collector harassing Vivian, but an illegitimate son of Terrence who accidentally killed him in a fit of rage.
83	16	"Missing"	Mike Smith	Story by : Zyana Salazar; Teleplay by : Zyana Salazar & Larry Kaplow	March 9, 2020	416	6.31
FBI agents arrest Elena Smith for kidnapping her 3-year old niece, Sarah Cooper, 12 years ago because of overwhelming evidence that Sarah's father, Jim Cooper, was abusing both Sarah and his now-deceased wife (Elena's sister). Sarah, now 15 and known by the name Chloe Smith, has been raised by Elena as her daughter. Bull and Benny anticipate a difficult trial, given that there is no doubt Elena is guilty of the crime, so Bull hopes to select jurors who will see the act as a rescue instead of a kidnapping. Marissa proposes that Jim, now living in Florida with a new wife and 2-year old son, could still be abusive, so Danny goes to investigate. Danny finds evidence from the son's preschool that he has been abused, but the judge will not let Benny call any witnesses who did not see Jim abuse his wife or son first-hand. Danny locates the wife, Sofia, and coaxes her to appear as a witness, which turns the case around.
84	17	"The Invisible Woman"	Randall Zisk	Sarah H. Haught	March 16, 2020	417	7.11
Due to a previous pro bono agreement that TAC is required to honor, they defend Dr. Natalie Reznick, who is accused of sending anthrax-laden cards to multiple people, two of whom died from the substance. The letters were sent shortly after federal funding was cut for the research Reznick's department conducts. While it's widely believed she sent the cards to prove that anthrax is still a threat, Reznick insists she's been framed. During the trial, which is not going well, Marissa opens a card with Taylor nearby and a powdery substance explodes out, potentially contaminating both. It turns out to be powdered sugar, likely sent by someone who is angry with TAC for defending "Dr. Anthrax". Danny and Taylor ultimately construct video evidence from a series of cameras that show Reznick's supervisor mailing letters within the opportune time window.
85	18	"Off the Rails"	Mike Smith	Travis Donnelly	April 6, 2020	418	7.16
On a snowy evening, train pilot Walter Mora (Craig muMs Grant) sees a green signal but his train crashes into a parked train, killing four passengers and injuring several more. Mora awakes from his own injuries six days later with no recollection of the incident. TAC takes the case, defending Mora against the train company which has ruled pilot error, but Bull quickly notices that Mora is depressed and seems unwilling to fight. Danny interviews a potential witness, another train pilot who was fired for saying a signal was green when it should have been red, but he could see the idle train in the distance and was able to stop. After that witness is ruled out because there is no proof to support his claims, Taylor works all night to uncover anomalies in the train company's maintenance records that support intermittently malfunctioning signals. Meanwhile, Benny presses Bull to get his daughter baptized, while Bull is refusing because Izzy will not marry him for a second time.
86	19	"The Sovereigns"	Carlos Bernard	Pamela Wechsler	April 13, 2020	419	7.34
Idealistic Judge Duggan (Kelcy Griffin) is arrested for obstructing the FBI when they show up in her courtroom to arrest a witness, a nurse who helped a doctor in an assisted suicide. Duggan had allowed the witness to leave out the back door of the court so she could meet with lawyers before being arrested. The FBI claims they are within their rights to arrest anyone on a Federal crime, but Duggan contests witnesses who make deals should not feel threatened by another agency. Bull instructs Benny that they want jurors who can see not just the letter of the law, but also the intent of the law. Benny seems to be making headway in the hearing, when the prosecution calls a rebuttal witness to the stand. The witness says Duggan had lunch with him twice to discuss the possibility of a daytime courtroom show. Though Duggan says she made no deal with the witness, the jury is affected and finds her guilty. As a last-ditch effort, Bull and Benny find a way to appeal to the acting judge (Xander Berkeley) in Duggan's case during the sentencing phase.
87	20	"Wrecked"	Dennis Smith	Nichole Millard	May 4, 2020	420	6.87
While Taylor and her life-long friend, Caroline, spend a night out on the town for their annual get-together, Caroline is struck by a Lamborghini Urus driven by a rich, underage-drinking, diplomat's daughter. When Caroline doesn’t make it through surgery, leaving her 12 year old son orphaned, Taylor wants to take the matter to court. Although the immunity agreement prohibits a manslaughter trial, TAC is able to bring a civil suit. During the investigation, it becomes evident the diplomat's daughter is protecting her friend who was actually driving and does not have the same privileges of diplomatic immunity.

=== Season 5 (2020–21) ===
No. overall	No. in season	Title	Directed by	Written by	Original release date	Prod. code	U.S. viewers (millions)
88	1	"My Corona"	Glenn Gordon Caron	Glenn Gordon Caron	November 16, 2020	501	4.47
As the COVID-19 lockdown becomes prolonged and jury trials continue to be postponed, Bull begins to worry if he can pay his staff and keep his office open any longer. An opportunity arises when a representative from LDI, a company that uses software to assist landlords in background checks for potential tenants, says they are being sued by multiple people who were denied apartments because others with the same or similar names had background issues. Desperate for a paying client, Bull takes the case, but soon learns the jury will be remote and TAC can only hear them, not see them. Bull becomes convinced that a juror Marissa does not want is the key to winning the case, but he cannot explain why. After the case seems unwinnable and is sure to go to a settlement, Bull insists he wants to meet that juror. When he does, the juror looks just like Izzy. Bull then awakes from a five-day slumber, having recovered from his own bout with COVID-19, and realizes the entire LDI trial was a dream. When Benny enters the room, he tells Bull that New York will be resuming jury trials. Bull immediately asks about jurors, and learns they will be present in the courtroom, wearing masks and sitting at least six feet apart. The episode ends with the main cast doing a lip dub to "How Can I Be Sure" by The Young Rascals as the sets are dismantled to show how the series is being produced during the COVID-19 pandemic.
89	2	"The Great Divide"	Michael Weatherly	Pamela Wechsler	November 23, 2020	502	4.67
Chunk agrees to defend Lily Knowles, who is being sued for wrongful death in a case brought by the wealthy Evelyn Waters. Waters' daughter Claire and her boyfriend were killed by a collapsed beam in a dilapidated building used by struggling artists as a place to squat and work. Lily is accused of encouraging artists to stay there, despite being told that the building was unsafe. As Chunk is surveying the building with Lily, Benny shows up with Evelyn. They bring the conflict of interest concerns to Bull, who initially says TAC must defend Lily because Chunk was first to line up his client. Benny argues that Chunk's client is pro bono while Evelyn can pay, and TAC desperately needs a paying case. Bull then says they must try to get the judge to agree to TAC representing both sides, which she does after accepting their terms. Benny has Danny and Marissa work for him, while Bull and Taylor work for Chunk. As the case moves along, Chunk confides to Bull how much he needs to learn from Benny, whose tactics appear to be working. The jury indeed finds Lily responsible for the two deaths, but they award damages of only one dollar. As the episode closes, Benny is approached by an ADA, who tells him the current District Attorney is embroiled in controversy and will be stepping down. He wants Benny to run for DA in a special April election.
90	3	"Prison Break"	Eric Stoltz	Kathryn Price & Nichole Millard	November 30, 2020	503	4.90
When her transport van is pulled over in an area off the beaten path, prisoner Ronnie Vincent escapes into the brush, causing guard Roland Terrell to accidentally shoot and kill his partner who chased after Ronnie. TAC represents Ronnie, with Chunk believing her claim that Terrell was preparing to rape her. TAC looks for jurors that may distrust authority figures, but their final selection turns out to be someone Marissa knows from high school. When she joins a classmates website to look him up, the man makes contact with her via text. This gets the juror thrown out, and the only alternate is a juror that TAC strongly avoided. During the case, Chunk points out that Ronnie had no incentive to escape with her sentence on jewelry theft ending in six months. The prosecutor brings evidence that the other thief involved is getting out three months earlier than Ronnie, and there was about $300,000 in jewelry never recovered. Terrell owes the van being pulled over to recurring mechanical issues, which the police motor pool representative seems to confirm. However, Danny learns of one van that was never checked for evidence because it had recently been decommissioned. That van turns out to have Terrell's semen in it, showing a pattern of raping female prisoners. Meanwhile, Benny and Izzy wonder why Bull has not given his blessing for Benny to run for DA. Bull says he is worried about the dirty nature of politics, but ultimately assures Benny he will support him.
91	4	"The Ex Factor"	Dan Lerner	Marissa Matteo & Glenn Gordon Caron	December 14, 2020	504	5.14
Marissa is awakened early in the morning by FBI agents and hauled downtown, where she sees her estranged husband, Greg. Agents state that Douglas Scott, who owns a third of Greg's restaurant, is a drug dealer that has been laundering money through the establishment. They accuse Marissa and Greg, who still co-own the other two-thirds, of being complicit. Greg tells Marissa that he knew something smelled, but he chose to look the other way because it meant he could keep the restaurant open. TAC represents both Marissa and Greg, but on the day of Marissa's testimony, Bull advises her to be completely honest, even if it hurts Greg. Marissa does imply on the stand that Greg knew Scott's money could have been dirty. Greg then flees the court before his turn to take the stand. The next day, the federal prosecutor tells the judge they have accepted a plea: Greg will serve a reduced sentence of no more than 36 months in exchange for having the charges against Marissa dropped and cooperating in the case against Scott. On the courthouse steps, Marissa thanks Greg and invites him to Christmas dinner. Meanwhile, Bull is conflicted over giving Izzy an engagement ring for Christmas, wary following her two failed marriages, including the first one to him. Two days before Christmas, Izzy gives Bull an engagement ring and pops the question.
92	5	"Fallen Idols"	Kevin Berlandi	Steven Paul Martinez	January 4, 2021	505	5.62
TAC defends Rey Lucas (Liam Wright), a prominent religious leader with a large following who is accused of killing his wife, Olivia. The pastor's credibility is challenged when it's revealed he had a secret gay lover, which he kept hidden from his parishioners as well as thousands of readers who bought his book about marital success. The pastor insists Olivia knew about his sexuality, and in fact she had a lesbian lover, but they stayed married for their mutual benefit. The case is further complicated when the wife's lover testifies that she was pressuring Olivia to end her marriage. A later revelation that Olivia also handled finances for the church points to another motive and another suspect.
93	6	"To Save a Life"	Bethany Rooney	Chamblee Smith	January 18, 2021	506	4.68
TAC defends Dr. Kinsey, who is being sued for malpractice after a patient, one of several mass shooting victims in the ER on the fateful day, dies while under her care. Kinsey was forced to make a choice between two victims, and chose to use a non-authorized REBOA procedure to stabilize a male patient while attending to a female patient whose condition was worse than initially thought. The male patient, Watkins, died after Kinsey's life-saving efforts on the female patient took too long. Bull assigns Chunk to try the case, over the client's initial objections. The prosecution argues that the procedure and Kinsey's neglect caused Watkins' death, and testimony from a nurse (whom Kinsey scolded that day) and the supervising surgeon Dr. Park seem to back up the charges. Chunk ignores Bull's request to call for a recess at a critical point, explaining that he thought the jury needed to hear his cross-examination immediately. Bull angrily says Chunk got lucky, and insists he obey his instructions next time. Prior to the last day in court, Chunk sees something on hospital video that turns the case in Kinsey's favor. Afterward, Chunk tells Benny of the rush he feels by helping a client win, and Benny responds that it's one thing he will miss if he becomes District Attorney.
94	7	"The Head of the Goat"	Mike Smith	Sarah H. Haught	January 25, 2021	507	5.38
TAC is contacted to provide defense in a federal case wherein Alicia Doherty, a wife and mother, is accused of assisting her husband who blew up an ATF agent's vehicle with the agent and his two young sons inside. The accused husband was soon shot dead by FBI agents, who then arrested Alicia. Bull and Benny face significant circumstantial evidence and even some physical evidence when Alicia's fingerprints are found on some of the bomb materials, but she testifies her husband asked her to buy the circuit board and wiring under the guise that he was building a computer. Benny faces concerns from his campaign team and Izzy that defending a possible domestic terrorist won't play well in his run for DA, but Benny insists his loyalty to TAC won't be compromised. Benny recalls an FBI witness after TAC discovers he was undercover in an anti-government chat room with the bomber, getting the witness to admit the man's posts gave him no reason to know he would go that far, and thus he could not arrest the culprit before the incident. A reporter from a prominent newspaper sees Benny's cross examination and passionate closing argument, and tells him that the paper will be endorsing him for DA.
95	8	"Cloak and Beaker"	Dennis Smith	Steven Paul Martinez	February 8, 2021	508	5.22
Dr. Edwin Pruitt is arrested after stealing his own research material from his employer, Bressadyne Labs, and trying to carry the material onto a plane bound for the United Arab Emirates. Pruitt says he made a breakthrough in developing a cure for Parkinson's disease, but Bressadyne shut it down and stripped his funding soon after. He is sure they did so because the firm would make more money treating Parkinson's than curing it. In court, the prosecution says the stolen material contains viruses that could be weaponized by a foreign entity. Pruitt claims he only chose the UAE after they promised the most funding and support. Bull tasks Taylor with trying to hack Bressadyne to see if they left anything out of discovery. Although Bressadyne's systems fought back almost immediately after the firewall breach, Taylor was able to grab a screen shot showing the file size of a key meeting minutes document. She notices the file size in the screen shot is larger than the file Bressadyne provided in discovery. Knowing none of the management will testify to what is left out of the minutes, Danny seeks out the administrative assistant who actually took the minutes and gets her to testify. Pruitt is found not guilty and freed, but angrily asks when he will get his research back. Bull assures him that when this case hits the press, Bressadyne will surely let him continue his research at another lab, rather than be known as the company the killed the Parkinson's cure. Meanwhile, Taylor has concerns about leaving her son with her ex-husband after seeing he has a new, younger girlfriend that she knows nothing about.
96	9	"The Bad Client"	Eric Stoltz	Travis Donnelly	February 22, 2021	509	5.11
Legal TV personality Madeline McBride (Callie Thorne) is convinced that Jeremy Brennan is guilty of raping and murdering his preteen stepdaughter, Kaylee, though police have not made an arrest. Madeline's claims cause Jeremy to be constantly harassed, leading to a lawsuit brought by him and his wife, Kaylee's mother. TAC wants to convince the jury that McBride has first amendment protection, but Bull and Benny are taken aback when McBride continues to target Brennan on her show while on trial. Even worse, Brennan commits suicide, with a witness later testifying that he suffered from depression. The defense is further weakened when another man confesses to the rape and murder. Despite TAC's best efforts, McBride is found guilty and ordered to pay damages of $2.5 million. McBride is also fired by her network, but assures Bull and Benny that the publicity generated by the trial will easily land her a broadcasting job somewhere else. Meanwhile, Danny learns that not only has her estranged father passed away, but also that he moved back to New York a few years ago without telling her.
97	10	"The Boy Who Cried Murder"	Dennis Smith	Zyana Salazar	March 15, 2021	510	5.12
Following the funeral for her best friend Miriam, Izzy is approached by Miriam's youngest son, Taj, who suspects his mother's death was not accidental. The reason: Taj found his mother's earring in her upstairs bedroom, which he's certain she wore when visiting him at school earlier on the day she died. Police had reported she fell off a ladder on the lower floor of the house. Over objections from Taj's father and older brother, Miriam's body is exhumed, and evidence points to a skull fracture inconsistent with a fall onto a flat surface. After one day at trial, Taj's brother Arin approaches Bull and Benny, pleading with them to stop the trial before Taj, who has a history of drug abuse, is put on the stand. However, it later becomes clear why Arin wanted the trial stopped.
98	11	"Truth and Reconciliation"	Deborah Reinisch	Gia Gordon	April 12, 2021	511	5.12
13 years ago, Detective Kaminsky arrests Arthur Craddick for the murder of drug dealer Ivan Kovolchuk and Ivan's infant son, whom he was carrying. Arthur's arrest is based solely on eyewitness testimony, and Bull, then a forensic psychologist, appears at trial as an expert witness to refute the validity of the testimony. Arthur is still convicted and given 25 years to life. Convinced that Arthur was convicted because he had the wrong jury, Bull is inspired to start TAC, seeking out Marissa for his first hire. In the present day, Arthur hires Bull to help with his motion for a retrial, based on a confession from mobster Kiril Sidorenko. On his deathbed due to cancer, Sidorenko confesses on webcam that he could never get over killing a baby. However, Arthur's motion for a retrial is denied when Sidorenko dies on the way to the hearing. Bull succeeds in getting Arthur's sentence reduced to 18 to 25 years, based on uncovering Sidorenko's confessions to several other unsolved murders. This makes Arthur eligible for parole, and the team is able to get his parole granted when the wife and mother of the victims, Zasha Kovolchuk, testifies under pressure after Taylor uncovers evidence that Zasha has received monthly payments from Sidorenko for years. Arthur and his son, Leo, are celebrating his release when police arrive and arrest Leo for the murder of Kaminsky, who failed to appear for the second day of the parole hearing.
99	12	"Evidence to the Contrary"	Carl Seaton	Leland Jay Anderson	April 19, 2021	512	4.69
As TAC defends Leo who is accused of murdering Kaminsky, several things are working against the defense, including multiple witnesses seeing Leo threaten Kaminsky, Leo's prominent work with Black Lives Matter and arrest during a protest, and the fact that Leo's handprint was found on Kaminsky's car. Also damaging, a jury member TAC strongly opposed was forced by the judge to be among the twelve after TAC had already dismissed too many white jurors for the judge's liking. As the trial seems to be headed toward a conviction, Arthur takes the stand and confesses to the murder, later telling TAC he knew from experience that Leo would probably lose. However, Danny and Taylor are able to uncover evidence that Kaminsky was killed by two fellow cops who were involved with him in an illegal prescription drug ring. Leo's trial is dismissed, and a judge decides to throw out Arthur's perjury charge, given that he already served 12 years for something he did not do.
100	13	"Law of the Jungle"	Joe Morton	Marissa Matteo	April 26, 2021	513	5.02
Holly Kerrigan shoots and kills wealthy philanthropist Roger Navarre as he attends the funeral of a young woman who committed suicide. She then turns the gun on herself but is tackled by another attendee before pulling the trigger. She tells Bull and Benny that she wants to plead guilty and will gladly take her punishment, including the death penalty. After hearing her story and learning that Navarre preyed on several young women between ages 14 and 16, Bull and Benny eventually decide to enter a plea of not guilty by reason of insanity. They get an expert witness to testify that Holly was likely suffering from a form of PTSD, leading to her actions at the funeral. As a trial strategy, Bull asks some of Navarre's victims to sit in the gallery. These women stand up during closing arguments, each confessing to having some part in helping Holly kill Navarre, which leads to a mistrial. As ADA Conway is contemplating a retrial, Bull convinces her that she can make a name for herself by doing what she knows is the right thing. Conway holds a press conference, saying the state will not pursue another trial as long as Holly agrees to psychiatric treatment.
101	14	"Under the Influence"	Geary McLeod	Nichole Millard & Kathryn Price	May 3, 2021	514	5.57
Chunk's daughter Anna asks him to represent Callum Hartwell, a 14-year old whom her college professor mentors on the weekend, after Callum is accused of carjacking and assault. Anna also tells her father that she is dating a man, Brooks, who is about ten years older. Callum, who had earlier reluctantly agreed to the crime via text, is told he can get leniency if he names his cohorts. Callum refuses, leaving TAC with an uphill battle at trial. Chunk becomes suspicious of Brooks' keen interest in Callum, and asks Taylor to covertly look into him. His suspicions seem to be confirmed when Taylor reveals large deposits appearing in Brooks' bank account. However, Brooks turns out to have legitimate reasons for the deposits, while Callum finally reveals his co-conspirators -- his girlfriend Vanessa and her older brother Victor, who was calling the shots. Meanwhile, Taylor reluctantly contacts her ex-husband's girlfriend, Rachel, to watch her son, after running out of options. She finally starts warming up to Rachel, only to have her ex kiss her while Rachel is out of the room.
102	15	"Snatchback"	Martha Mitchell	Sarah H. Haught	May 10, 2021	515	4.93
TAC defends Hank Alston (Gino Anthony Pesi), a former Army Ranger who is now a freelance child recovery expert. Hank's latest client Heather Shaughnessy (Gillian Saker) is suing him for fraud after he failed to return her daughter from the Russian father who kidnapped her and took her to his home country. Hank has to not only prove that he left Heather's child in Russia for her own safety, but that he has had success recovering other children. This proves difficult because Hank's previous clients want to remain anonymous due to fears that their spouses will attempt another abduction. Danny is able to track down one mother whose two children Hank recovered, but she does not want to testify because her Brazilian ex-husband, Beto, is currently in town. TAC locates Beto and puts him on the stand, where he becomes a hostile witness and eventually admits it was Hank who took his children in Brazil. Elsewhere, Izzy and ADA Keihl drag a reluctant Benny into the world of negative campaigning, resulting in one of Benny's opponents dropping out of the New York DA race.
103	16	"A Friend in Need"	Eric Stoltz	Pamela Wechsler & Travis Donnelly	May 17, 2021	516	5.08
As Benny surges to a lead in the DA polls, Bull is approached by David Sherman, the DA who recently stepped down amid a campaign contribution scandal related to charges he dismissed following a deadly crane collapse. Bull reluctantly takes the case for TAC because he owes Sherman a favor from a time when he and Benny tried one of their first cases. Bull asks Benny to trust him, not indicating that Benny himself would be affected if he declines Sherman's request. Bull, Chunk and the team try to argue that the charges against Sherman are politically motivated, given that the Attorney General bringing the case was set to run against Sherman for an open Senate seat. TAC and Sherman seem destined for defeat, until Benny appears as a last minute witness after a conversation he had with ADA Kiehl, the man who encouraged him to run for DA. Benny says that not only is he withdrawing from the DA race, but that Sherman should be returned to the DA position. Following a successful verdict, Bull arrives home to find Judge Rand, who presided over the case, waiting in his apartment. However, Rand is there to marry Bull and Izzy, in front of Benny and the TAC team.

=== Season 6 (2021–22) ===
No. overall	No. in season	Title	Directed by	Written by	Original release date	Prod. code	U.S. viewers (millions)
104	1	"Gone"	Eric Stoltz	Kathryn Price & Nichole Millard	October 7, 2021	601	4.18
After a night out, Bull and Izzy return home to discover their babysitter bound and gagged, while Astrid has been taken. The entire TAC team pitches in to help Bull identify the perpetrators before a 7 a.m. deadline to hand over $1,000,000. Based on the babysitter's claim that the kidnapper referred to Bull as "Dr. Jason", he deduces that the incident may be related to his old profession as a child psychologist, ultimately learning the motive is revenge.
105	2	"Espionage"	Michael Weatherly	Tom Szentgyörgyi	October 14, 2021	602	3.83
TAC defends Jerry McDonnell, accused of espionage after his romantic interest, revealed to be an undercover FBI agent, found proof that he leaked details about movement of nuclear materials at a military base in his former Kentucky hometown. Bull wants McDonnell to confess while explaining how thousands of people would get sick due to radioactive leaks at the facility, but Bull is clearly off his game due to Astrid's recent abduction. The case turns when Taylor sees evidence that AUSA Carto has done illegal wiretaps in previous cases, and they trick him into wiretapping TAC.
106	3	"Bull Undone"	John Aronson	Allison Intrieri	October 21, 2021	603	3.81
TAC takes the case of Jackson Martin, accused of killing his high school girlfriend Sarah 22 years ago after she broke up with him at a party. The case was dismissed, but reappeared in the public interest due to a docu-drama television series called When Rich Boys Kill, which clearly points to Jackson as the murderer. Bull and TAC have to fight a likely tainted jury, the public and the media, while Jackson continues to maintain his innocence. The case gets worse when Jackson's alibi, that he went to The Hamptons with his brother Billy, is found to have been falsified. But Bull sees something in Billy's responses that leads him to the truth.
107	4	"Uneasy Lies The Crown"	Dan Lerner	Steven Paul Martinez	October 28, 2021	604	4.32
Bull and TAC take on a potentially lucrative class-action lawsuit against a vaping company, contending that the company knew its product could explode. Bull is criticized by some clients in the case for turning down considerable settlement offers and opting to take risks for a bigger payday. The case is going well until a juror is injured and the only alternate is a man TAC was strongly against. Bull is seen outside the man's house on the eve of the jury's decision. The next day the verdict is in, and the jury awards damages of over $100 million. However, Bull's celebration is short lived, as he is arrested for jury tampering. In the episode, Benny is mentioned to be enjoying life in Italy with his wife and won't be part of the team.
108	5	"King Bull"	Jackeline Tejada	Blair Singer	November 4, 2021	605	4.54
After being arrested for jury tampering, which he staunchly denies, Bull is in court for his bail hearing when he meets Lee Donaldson, CEO of the successful 20-Minute Oil & Lube chain. Donaldson was recently arrested for dancing naked in a public fountain, and is now being accused by two of his daughters (who are executives for his company) of being mentally unfit to run the business. Donaldson's youngest daughter is a lawyer whom Chunk knows, and TAC takes Donaldson's case. However, Bull is ordered to take a step back, as the defense feels his current tampering charge could bias the jury unfavorably. Meanwhile, Bull upsets Chunk by saying he does not want him as a lawyer in the tampering case, instead taking Izzy's advice to find a lawyer who previously beat him in court.
109	6	"Better Angels"	Dennis Smith	Gia Gordon	November 11, 2021	606	4.10
Bull shocks his team by taking the case of a midwife accused of illegally practicing medicine in New York's Mennonite community without a license, with only two days to prepare. Meanwhile, Bull's defense attorney Olivia Powell begins interviewing TAC employees regarding their feelings on Bull's jury tampering charges. Marissa angers Taylor by telling Olivia that Taylor had some doubts about Bull's innocence. Olivia later tells Bull that she is convinced he is innocent, believing his claim that he went through the witness's trash but never talked to him. However, Olivia says they have an uphill battle, as someone has gone to great lengths to ruin both Bull and his company.
110	7	"Confidence Man"	Geary McLeod	Jenny Raftery	December 2, 2021	607	4.13
The jury tampering trial begins, as Bull and his attorney face difficulty, given that Bull was seen outside the home of juror Randall Hughes. Bull insists he was only there to go through Hughes' trash, which is perfectly legal, though he admits he thought about approaching the witness. Hughes says he accepted $50,000 from Izzy's account because his son requires a kidney transplant, and medical bills have been piling up. The TAC team tries to track down the CEO of Smokestack, the defendant in the lucrative class action case, certain that he is behind the money transfer. However, when they learn Hughes' son got a donor kidney despite being far down the candidate list, their suspicions take them in another direction and ultimately exonerate Bull.
111	8	"Snowed In"	Dennis Smith	Zyanya Salazar	December 9, 2021	608	3.97
Clara, an ambitious assistant for a brutish sports agent, is accused of negligent manslaughter after she provides cocaine to her tennis star client, Dasha, and the client ends up dead. The drugs are confirmed to have been cut with fentanyl. The case pits Chunk against a cocky nemesis from law school, Robert Jones, who now works for the D.A. Bull hopes to gain a jury in the "Christmas spirit" just days before the holiday, but a snowstorm forces the jury to work into Christmas Eve. Danny postpones her own trip to Aruba to learn from the dealer who sold Clara the drugs that there was no fentanyl in his product. On the final day of testimony, Bull sees Dasha's teammate shaky and likely withdrawing, and TAC later learns she has a fentanyl prescription to treat an injury. Clara is found guilty of drug possession, but not guilty of manslaughter. Chunk is asked out by Robert, Danny gets her trip to Aruba, Marissa and Taylor spend Christmas together, and Bull spends Christmas with his family.
112	9	"False Positive"	Eric Stoltz	Leland Jay Anderson	January 6, 2022	609	4.76
TAC takes the case of a grieving mother whose son was shot dead by police after being incorrectly identified by facial recognition software. Although she has already settled with the NYPD, the financially well-off mother says she is using the money to make sure no other mothers share her pain. She wants to go after the facial recognition software company, hoping to get them to admit they knew about flaws in its product. Taylor gets involved with a hacker named Tidal, and the two ultimately dig up dirt on the company and its CEO. The company offers to settle even though they are winning the case, with Bull surmising it's because they knew they were hacked and that their shady financial dealings would become public. Meanwhile, Marissa accepts an offer to work for rival Bradley Lena. Bull seemingly wins her back by giving her a 20% raise and apologizing for not offering her Benny's office. But Lena makes one more move to secure Marissa: he offers her a full partnership and renames his company Lena-Morgan.
113	10	"Frontotemporal"	Carlos Bernard	Andrew Karlsruher	January 13, 2022	610	4.68
Taylor learns her ex-husband is moving to Hawaii, and wants to take their son with him. Under threat of prosecution, the FBI forces Taylor to help them stop hacker Tidal. Taylor almost fulfills their wishes, until seeing that Tidal's motives are just. While searching for Marissa's replacement, Bull and TAC take the case of a woman who killed her longtime business partner in a fit of rage. The woman is revealed to have a brain tumor that makes her behave erratically. While the jury believes she did not act intentionally, they still seem to want her in jail for fear that the tumor will cause her to hurt someone else. She undergoes a very risky surgery to be deemed no longer a threat. Bull hires a well qualified man to replace Marissa, but later goes to her new office to make a plea for her to return. Marissa says she loves her new job and rejects Bull again. Later, Bull and Chunk meet with the FBI reps and Taylor to get her exonerated, stating she did nothing illegal and has no obligation to work with the Feds. The FBI reps seem to accept defeat, but mention Taylor's ex-husband has hired a lawyer they know to fight for custody of their son, and her association with Tidal will not play well in family court.
114	11	"Family Matters"	Leslie Libman	Steven Paul Martinez	January 20, 2022	611	4.64
The team finds itself in a tense and unprecedented situation when Bull faces off against Marissa and her new boss, Bradley Lena, in court, following her departure from the company. Taylor's professional life works against her during her custody battle between her and Erik for Mauricio. Marissa realized through the course of the real estate development case and Taylor's custody battle that Bradley's values are different from hers and how she misses part of being in a family. At the end of the show, Marissa returns to be partners with Bull.
115	12	"Caliban"	Mike Smith	Tom Szentgyörgyi	February 24, 2022	612	4.44
The team gets a rare glimpse into Bull's life when his estranged brother of 13 years, Jacob Bull, enters TAC seeking help from Jason. Meanwhile, the team works with AUSA Pearlander to help a man work his way out of his father's Ponzi scheme, who had committed suicide during the FBI raid. The scene ends with Bull considering to call his estranged father.
116	13	"The Hard Right"	Martha Mitchell	Chandus Jackson	March 3, 2022	613	4.13
Bull helps his friend mount a diminished capacity defense for a sergeant (who is suffering from PTSD) accused of killing a fellow soldier, while Chunk tries to juggle the case itself and his daughter's coverage of the case as a third party. Meanwhile a French gallery owner, Hendri, needs legal assistance from Marissa who has a crush on him, to stop an auction house from selling a piece of art that should be repatriated.
117	14	"Safe Space"	Melissa Kalbfus-Paliocha	Mat Raney	March 10, 2022	614	4.18
Bull helps an agoraphobic client bring a wrongful death suit against the alleged killer of his beloved aunt, but the client's inability to testify in person threatens the trial; Chunk's new relationship with ADA Robert Jones hits a snag when his mother visits, as Chunk thinks that his mother is not open to his sexual preference and hesitates to introduce Rob to her.
118	15	"With These Hands"	Geneva Carr	Blair Singer	March 31, 2022	615	4.08
The surgeon who saved Bull's life after his heart attack is sued for malpractice; Taylor fights the urge to check into the background of Henri Fray, Marissa's new love interest. Henri manages to explain his married status to Marissa upon being confronted, but breaks up with her when Marissa admits that she did the background check on him.
119	16	"The Diana Affair"	Carl Seaton	Kathryn Price & Nichole Millard	April 7, 2022	616	3.91
Bull and Izzy experience marital discord when Bull decides to cancel the family trip and has the team lead the defense for his ex-girlfriend Diana who is accused of murdering her boyfriend's wife; personal conflicts abound for the TAC team when Chunk finds himself defending Diana in court against his boyfriend and prosecutor, Robert. Chunk eventually breaks up with Robert as Robert did not withdraw the charges, upon realizing that Diana is probably innocent before the verdict is read.
120	17	"Dark Horse"	Lou Diamond Phillips	Cara Hall	April 14, 2022	617	4.08
Izzy convinces Bull to defend a recovering alcoholic, Rafael – who was mentored by her, and is working as a jockey – who has been accused of setting a fire that killed both a prized racehorse and its trainer. Rafael puts his own testimony into question when he had been drinking vodka to calm his nerves at the stand.
121	18	"The Other Shoe"	Mike Smith	Jenny Raftery	April 21, 2022	618	4.19
Bull works with the prosecutor Reilly who had earlier charged Bull with bribing the jury, to put a Polish criminal away for murder. The key witness to the murder is an agent that was found to be stealing from evidence and before he can testify in court, had gone into a coma after being shot by the criminal's contact.
122	19	"Opening Up"	Sasha Alexander	Allison Intrieri	April 28, 2022	619	4.15
Bull sprained his back for most of this episode, leaving Chunk and Marissa to run the defence for Marissa's friend Kyla who is accused of using her power in her company to force an employee to have sexual relationship with her. To save her image, Kyla negotiated a deal for the plaintiff to drop the charges and her husband, who is the mastermind, to withdraw himself from the company and to agree to a divorce some time after.
123	20	"The Envelope, Please"	Jackeline Tejada	Tom Szentgyörgyi	May 12, 2022	620	3.93
Bull received news from his brother that their father had passed away. After reading a letter in the office, Bull found himself a few hours later at Brooklyn with no past recollection since the letter was opened. Bull spoke to his teacher who lived a block away to unlock his memories, and realized that the counselling session was only in his head as his teacher had passed away. Bull eventually agreed to join his brother to handle the funeral.
124	21	"Silent Killer"	Bethany Rooney	Andrew Karlsruher	May 19, 2022	621	3.74
Bull and his team defends a building owner who was accused by ADA Robert of killing his tenants with carbon monoxide by way of negligence. Marissa is attempting to partner up with another law firm which represents a major medical body, but her ex-partner Lena gets in her way with a copied version of her trial science algorithm. At the end of the episode, the owner shared with Bull that he had intentionally set off the poisoning to get rid of his blackmailer who had provided his alibi in a past case where the owner killed off a teenager.
125	22	"Goodbye"	Eric Stoltz	Kathryn Price & Nichole Millard	May 26, 2022	622	4.22
In the series finale, Bull and his team tries ways to bring the trial to a mistrial without breaking the privilege rights, but in vain. Taylor manages to lead a discovery of the teenager's dead body by way of a treasure hunt. However, DNA is not obtainable. At the eleventh hour, Bull rushes into the jury room to inform them that his client is guilty, thereby causing a mistrial. Bull's courtroom privilege is revoked and he decides to leave TAC to avoid tarnishing TAC's reputation, while putting Marissa in charge.

== Ratings ==
=== Series overview ===
Bull : U.S. viewers per episode (millions)

Season	Episode number																							Average
Season	1	2	3	4	5	6	7	8	9	10	11	12	13	14	15	16	17	18	19	20	21	22	23	Average
1	15.56	13.61	13.00	12.29	11.61	11.87	10.87	11.68	11.61	11.30	11.11	11.17	10.78	10.64	10.66	10.39	10.90	11.13	10.32	10.83	11.03	10.97	8.54	11.39
2	10.06	10.79	11.26	10.49	10.70	9.63	10.77	10.34	8.98	10.86	11.17	10.50	11.08	10.90	10.70	10.11	10.64	10.65	11.02	10.83	10.37	11.76	–	10.62
3	7.33	6.74	6.52	6.48	6.76	7.23	6.43	6.50	6.59	7.37	7.09	6.70	6.34	6.25	6.80	6.72	6.41	6.78	6.66	6.45	6.21	7.19	–	6.71
4	6.42	5.90	6.12	5.83	6.15	6.66	5.73	5.78	6.03	6.42	6.19	6.05	6.47	6.31	6.22	6.31	7.11	7.16	7.34	6.87	–			6.35
5	4.47	4.67	4.90	5.14	5.62	4.68	5.38	5.22	5.11	5.12	5.12	4.69	5.02	5.57	4.93	5.08	–							5.05
6	4.18	3.83	3.81	4.32	4.54	4.10	4.13	3.97	4.76	4.68	4.64	4.44	4.13	4.18	4.08	3.91	4.08	4.19	4.15	3.93	3.74	4.22	–	TBA

Audience measurement performed by Nielsen Media Research

=== Season 1 ===
Viewership and ratings per episode of List of Bull (2016 TV series) episodes
No.	Title	Air date	Rating/share (18–49)	Viewers (millions)	DVR (18–49)	DVR viewers (millions)	Total (18–49)	Total viewers (millions)
1	"The Necklace"	September 20, 2016	2.2/8	15.57	0.9	4.94	3.1	20.51
2	"The Woman in 8D"	September 27, 2016	1.9/7	13.62	1.0	4.86	2.9	18.48
3	"Unambiguous"	October 11, 2016	1.7/6	13.00	0.8	4.41	2.5	17.41
4	"Callisto"	October 18, 2016	1.6/6	12.29	0.8	4.17	2.4	16.46
5	"Just Tell the Truth"	October 25, 2016	1.5/5	11.61	0.7	3.77	2.2	15.38
6	"Bedside Manner"	November 15, 2016	1.5/5	11.87	0.8	3.83	2.3	15.70
7	"Never Saw the Sign"	November 22, 2016	1.5/5	10.89	0.8	4.26	2.3	15.15
8	"Too Perfect"	December 6, 2016	1.5/5	11.68	0.8	4.06	2.3	15.74
9	"Light My Fire"	December 13, 2016	1.4/5	11.61	0.8	3.76	2.2	15.38
10	"E.J."	January 3, 2017	1.5/5	11.30	0.9	4.26	2.4	15.56
11	"Teacher's Pet"	January 17, 2017	1.5/5	11.11	0.7	3.88	2.2	14.99
12	"Stockholm Syndrome"	January 24, 2017	1.3/5	11.17	0.8	3.74	2.1	14.92
13	"The Fall"	February 7, 2017	1.3/4	10.78	0.8	3.82	2.1	14.60
14	"It's Classified"	February 14, 2017	1.3/5	10.64	0.8	3.87	2.1	14.51
15	"What's Your Number?"	February 21, 2017	1.3/5	10.66	0.7	3.63	2.0	14.29
16	"Free Fall"	March 7, 2017	1.3/5	10.39	0.8	—N/a	2.1	—N/a
17	"Name Game"	March 28, 2017	1.3/5	10.90	0.7	3.57	2.0	14.47
18	"Dressed to Kill"	April 4, 2017	1.3/5	11.13	0.6	3.22	1.9	14.32
19	"Bring It On"	April 18, 2017	1.1/4	10.32	0.8	3.86	1.9	14.18
20	"Make Me"	May 2, 2017	1.2/5	10.83	0.8	3.67	2.0	14.50
21	"How to Dodge a Bullet"	May 9, 2017	1.2/5	11.03	0.7	3.69	1.9	14.72
22	"Dirty Little Secrets"	May 16, 2017	1.3/5	10.97	0.7	3.81	2.0	14.66
23	"Benevolent Deception"	May 23, 2017	1.1/4	8.54	0.8	4.15	1.9	12.70

=== Season 2 ===
Viewership and ratings per episode of List of Bull (2016 TV series) episodes
No.	Title	Air date	Rating/share (18–49)	Viewers (millions)	DVR (18–49)	DVR viewers (millions)	Total (18–49)	Total viewers (millions)
1	"School for Scandal"	September 26, 2017	1.3/5	10.06	—N/a	4.03	—N/a	14.09
2	"Already Gone"	October 3, 2017	1.2/5	10.79	0.7	3.66	1.9	14.45
3	"A Business of Favors"	October 10, 2017	1.3/5	11.26	—N/a	3.56	—N/a	14.82
4	"The Illusion of Control"	October 17, 2017	1.2/4	10.49	0.7	3.75	1.9	14.24
5	"Play the Hand You're Dealt"	October 24, 2017	1.2/4	10.70	0.8	3.91	2.0	14.61
6	"The Exception to the Rule"	October 31, 2017	1.0/4	9.63	0.7	3.83	1.7	13.46
7	"No Good Deed"	November 7, 2017	1.2/5	10.77	0.7	3.92	1.9	14.69
8	"The Devil, The Detail"	November 14, 2017	1.1/4	10.34	—N/a	3.88	—N/a	14.24
9	"Thanksgiving"	November 21, 2017	1.1/4	8.98	0.7	3.88	1.8	12.87
10	"Home for the Holidays"	December 12, 2017	1.3/5	10.86	—N/a	—N/a	—N/a	—N/a
11	"Survival Instincts"	January 2, 2018	1.3/5	11.17	—N/a	—N/a	—N/a	—N/a
12	"Grey Areas"	January 9, 2018	1.2/5	10.50	0.8	4.24	2.0	14.74
13	"Kill Shot"	January 23, 2018	1.3/5	11.08	0.8	4.35	2.1	15.43
14	"Keep Your Friends Close"	February 6, 2018	1.2/5	10.90	0.7	4.31	1.9	15.21
15	"Witness for the Prosecution"	February 27, 2018	1.1/4	10.70	0.8	4.26	1.9	14.96
16	"Absolution"	March 6, 2018	1.1/4	10.11	0.8	4.06	1.9	14.17
17	"Gag Order"	March 13, 2018	1.2/5	10.64	0.6	3.86	1.8	14.50
18	"Bad Medicine"	March 27, 2018	1.1/4	10.65	0.7	3.81	1.8	14.46
19	"A Redemption"	April 3, 2018	1.2/5	11.02	0.7	3.69	1.9	14.69
20	"Justified"	April 17, 2018	1.1/4	10.83	0.7	3.81	1.8	14.64
21	"Reckless"	May 1, 2018	1.1/5	10.37	0.6	3.90	1.7	14.27
22	"Death Sentence"	May 8, 2018	1.2/5	11.76	—N/a	3.50	—N/a	15.28

=== Season 3 ===
Viewership and ratings per episode of List of Bull (2016 TV series) episodes
No.	Title	Air date	Rating/share (18–49)	Viewers (millions)	DVR (18–49)	DVR viewers (millions)	Total (18–49)	Total viewers (millions)
1	"The Ground Beneath Their Feet"	September 24, 2018	0.9/4	7.33	0.9	5.24	1.8	12.58
2	"Jury Duty"	October 1, 2018	0.8/4	6.74	0.8	5.03	1.6	11.77
3	"Excessive Force"	October 8, 2018	0.8/3	6.52	0.8	4.91	1.6	11.43
4	"Justice for Cable"	October 15, 2018	0.8/3	6.48	0.7	4.99	1.5	11.47
5	"The Missing Piece"	October 22, 2018	0.8/3	6.76	0.7	4.51	1.5	11.27
6	"Fool Me Twice"	October 29, 2018	0.9/4	7.23	0.7	4.61	1.6	11.85
7	"A Girl Without Feelings"	November 5, 2018	0.8/3	6.43	0.8	5.11	1.6	11.50
8	"But for the Grace"	November 12, 2018	0.8/3	6.50	0.7	4.35	1.5	10.85
9	"Separation"	December 3, 2018	0.7/3	6.59	0.8	4.66	1.5	11.25
10	"A Higher Law"	December 10, 2018	0.8/3	7.37	0.8	4.65	1.6	12.05
11	"Separate Together"	January 14, 2019	0.7/4	7.09	0.8	4.77	1.5	11.86
12	"Split Hairs"	January 21, 2019	0.8/3	6.70	0.7	4.84	1.5	11.55
13	"Prior Bad Acts"	February 4, 2019	0.8/4	6.34	0.8	5.09	1.6	11.47
14	"Leave It All Behind"	February 11, 2019	0.7/3	6.25	0.7	4.62	1.4	10.88
15	"Security Fraud"	February 18, 2019	0.7/3	6.80	0.8	4.79	1.5	11.59
16	"Forfeiture"	February 25, 2019	0.8/4	6.72	0.7	4.54	1.5	11.26
17	"Parental Guidance"	March 18, 2019	0.7/4	6.41	0.7	4.64	1.4	11.06
18	"Don't Say a Word"	April 1, 2019	0.6/3	6.78	0.5	3.74	1.1	10.53
19	"Bounty"	April 15, 2019	0.6/3	6.66	0.6	4.37	1.2	11.04
20	"The Good One"	April 29, 2019	0.6/3	6.45	0.6	4.43	1.2	10.89
21	"When the Rains Came"	May 6, 2019	0.6/3	6.21	0.6	4.02	1.2	10.23
22	"Pillar of Salt"	May 13, 2019	0.7/4	7.19	0.5	3.99	1.2	11.18

=== Season 4 ===
Viewership and ratings per episode of List of Bull (2016 TV series) episodes
No.	Title	Air date	Rating/share (18–49)	Viewers (millions)	DVR (18–49)	DVR viewers (millions)	Total (18–49)	Total viewers (millions)
1	"Labor Days"	September 23, 2019	0.7/4	6.42	0.6	4.55	1.3	10.98
2	"Fantastica Voyage"	September 30, 2019	0.6/3	5.90	0.7	4.60	1.3	10.51
3	"Rectify"	October 7, 2019	0.6/3	6.12	0.6	4.27	1.2	10.38
4	"Her Own Two Feet"	October 14, 2019	0.6/3	5.83	0.6	4.13	1.2	9.96
5	"Billboard Justice"	October 21, 2019	0.7/4	6.15	0.5	4.00	1.2	10.15
6	"Into the Mystic"	October 28, 2019	0.7/4	6.66	0.5	4.18	1.2	10.84
7	"Doctor Killer"	November 4, 2019	0.6/3	5.73	0.5	4.31	1.1	10.04
8	"Safe and Sound"	November 18, 2019	0.5/3	5.78	0.6	4.24	1.1	10.02
9	"The Flying Carpet"	November 25, 2019	0.6/3	6.03	0.6	4.14	1.2	10.18
10	"Imminent Danger"	December 16, 2019	0.7/4	6.42	0.6	4.12	1.3	10.54
11	"Look Back in Anger"	January 6, 2020	0.6/4	6.19	0.6	4.30	1.1	10.49
12	"Behind the Ivy"	January 20, 2020	0.6/4	6.05	0.6	4.35	1.2	10.40
13	"Child of Mine"	February 3, 2020	0.6	6.47	0.5	4.15	1.1	10.62
14	"Quid Pro Quo"	February 10, 2020	0.7	6.31	0.5	4.20	1.2	10.51
15	"Flesh and Blood"	February 17, 2020	0.6	6.22	0.5	4.12	1.1	10.34
16	"Missing"	March 9, 2020	0.6	6.31	0.5	4.13	1.1	10.44
17	"The Invisible Woman"	March 16, 2020	0.7	7.11	0.6	4.52	1.3	11.63
18	"Off the Rails"	April 6, 2020	0.7	7.16	0.5	4.36	1.2	11.52
19	"The Sovereigns"	April 13, 2020	0.7	7.34	0.5	4.02	1.2	11.36
20	"Wrecked"	May 4, 2020	0.6	6.87	0.5	4.19	1.1	11.06

=== Season 5 ===
Viewership and ratings per episode of List of Bull (2016 TV series) episodes
No.	Title	Air date	Rating (18–49)	Viewers (millions)	DVR (18–49)	DVR viewers (millions)	Total (18–49)	Total viewers (millions)
1	"My Corona"	November 16, 2020	0.4	4.47	0.4	3.82	0.8	8.29
2	"The Great Divide"	November 23, 2020	0.5	4.67	—N/a	—N/a	—N/a	—N/a
3	"Prison Break"	November 30, 2020	0.5	4.90	0.4	3.69	0.9	8.59
4	"The Ex Factor"	December 14, 2020	0.4	5.14	—N/a	—N/a	—N/a	—N/a
5	"Fallen Idols"	January 4, 2021	0.5	5.62	0.4	3.50	0.9	9.12
6	"To Save a Life"	January 18, 2021	0.5	4.68	—N/a	—N/a	—N/a	—N/a
7	"The Head of the Goat"	January 25, 2021	0.5	5.38	—N/a	—N/a	—N/a	—N/a
8	"Cloak and Beaker"	February 8, 2021	0.5	5.22	0.3	3.71	0.8	8.93
9	"The Bad Client"	February 22, 2021	0.5	5.11	0.4	3.77	0.9	8.88
10	"The Boy Who Cried Murder"	March 15, 2021	0.4	5.12	—N/a	—N/a	—N/a	—N/a
11	"Truth and Reconciliation"	April 12, 2021	0.4	5.12	—N/a	—N/a	—N/a	—N/a
12	"Evidence to the Contrary"	April 19, 2021	0.4	4.69	0.4	3.40	0.4	8.09
13	"Law of the Jungle"	April 26, 2021	0.5	5.02	0.4	3.31	0.9	8.33
14	"Under the Influence"	May 3, 2021	0.5	5.57	0.4	3.29	0.9	8.81
15	"Snatchback"	May 10, 2021	0.5	4.93	0.4	3.28	0.8	8.23
16	"A Friend in Need"	May 17, 2021	0.4	5.08	0.4	3.15	0.8	8.23

=== Season 6 ===
Viewership and ratings per episode of List of Bull (2016 TV series) episodes
No.	Title	Air date	Rating (18–49)	Viewers (millions)	DVR (18–49)	DVR viewers (millions)	Total (18–49)	Total viewers (millions)
1	"Gone"	October 7, 2021	0.4	4.18	—N/a	—N/a	—N/a	—N/a
2	"Espionage"	October 14, 2021	0.3	3.83	0.3	3.30	0.6	7.13
3	"Bull Undone"	October 21, 2021	0.3	3.81	0.3	3.33	0.6	7.14
4	"Uneasy Lies The Crown"	October 28, 2021	0.3	4.32	—N/a	—N/a	—N/a	—N/a
5	"King Bull"	November 4, 2021	0.3	4.54	—N/a	—N/a	—N/a	—N/a
6	"Better Angels"	November 11, 2021	0.3	4.10	—N/a	—N/a	—N/a	—N/a
7	"Confidence Man"	December 2, 2021	0.3	4.13	0.3	3.36	0.6	7.48
8	"Snowed In"	December 9, 2021	0.3	3.97	0.3	3.37	0.6	7.34
9	"False Positive"	January 6, 2022	0.4	4.76	—N/a	—N/a	—N/a	—N/a
10	"Frontotemporal"	January 13, 2022	0.4	4.68	—N/a	—N/a	—N/a	—N/a
11	"Family Matters"	January 20, 2022	0.4	4.64	—N/a	—N/a	—N/a	—N/a
12	"Caliban"	February 24, 2022	0.4	4.44	—N/a	—N/a	—N/a	—N/a
13	"The Hard Right"	March 3, 2022	0.3	4.13	—N/a	—N/a	—N/a	—N/a
14	"Safe Space"	March 10, 2022	0.4	4.18	—N/a	—N/a	—N/a	—N/a
15	"With These Hands"	March 31, 2022	0.3	4.08	—N/a	—N/a	—N/a	—N/a
16	"The Diana Affair"	April 7, 2022	0.3	3.91	—N/a	—N/a	—N/a	—N/a
17	"Dark Horse"	April 14, 2022	0.4	4.08	—N/a	—N/a	—N/a	—N/a
18	"The Other Shoe"	April 21, 2022	0.3	4.19	—N/a	—N/a	—N/a	—N/a
19	"Opening Up"	April 28, 2022	0.4	4.15	—N/a	—N/a	—N/a	—N/a
20	"The Envelope, Please"	May 12, 2022	0.3	3.93	—N/a	—N/a	—N/a	—N/a
21	"Silent Killer"	May 19, 2022	0.3	3.74	—N/a	—N/a	—N/a	—N/a
22	"Goodbye"	May 26, 2022	0.3	4.22	—N/a	—N/a	—N/a	—N/a

== Home media ==
Season	Episodes	DVD release dates			
Season	Episodes	Region 1	Region 2	Region 4	Discs
1	23	August 15, 2017	January 28, 2019	August 30, 2017	6
2	22	September 4, 2018	January 28, 2019	October 31, 2018	6
3	22	September 3, 2019			5
4	20	September 8, 2020			4
5	16	September 7, 2021			4
