= Bull (2016 TV series) =

American legal drama television series (2016–2022)

- Genre: Legal drama; Crime drama; Comedy drama
- Created by: Phil McGraw; Paul Attanasio
- Starring: Michael Weatherly; Freddy Rodriguez; Geneva Carr; Christopher Jackson; Jaime Lee Kirchner; Annabelle Attanasio; MacKenzie Meehan; Yara Martinez
- Composer: Jeff Russo
- Country of origin: United States
- Original language: English
- No. of seasons: 6
- No. of episodes: 125 (list of episodes)

Production
- Executive producers: Paul Attanasio; Phil McGraw; Jay McGraw; Justin Falvey (seasons 1–3); Darryl Frank (seasons 1–3); Mark Goffman; Steven Spielberg (seasons 1–3); Glenn Gordon Caron (seasons 1–5); Nichole Millard (season 6); Kathryn Price (season 6); Rodrigo Garcia
- Producer: Michael Weatherly
- Production location: New York City
- Running time: 43–45 minutes
- Production companies: Amblin Television (seasons 1–3); Picturemaker Productions (seasons 2–5); Atelier Paul Attanasio; Stage 29 Productions; CBS Television Studios (seasons 1–4); CBS Studios (seasons 5–6)

Original release
- Network: CBS
- Release: September 20, 2016 – May 26, 2022

Bull is an American legal drama television series created by Phil McGraw and Paul Attanasio and starring Michael Weatherly. CBS ordered the pilot to series on May 13, 2016,; it ran for six seasons from September 20, 2016, to May 26, 2022.

In April 2021, the series was renewed for a sixth season which premiered on October 7, 2021; it was announced in January 2022 that the sixth season would be the show's last. The two-part series finale aired on May 19 and 26.

== Premise ==
The series follows the employees at Trial Analysis Corporation (TAC), a jury consulting firm headed by Dr. Jason Bull, who is a psychologist and trial-science expert. Bull uses his skills and those of his team not only to select the right jurors for his clients, but also to help his clients' lawyers decide which type of argument will win over jurors best. Bull is inspired by the early career of Dr. Phil McGraw, who also serves as an executive producer.

In the first several episodes, the series had an opening monologue narrated by lead actor Michael Weatherly. The narration was as follows:

"I'm Dr. Jason Bull. I'm not a lawyer. I'm an expert in what's called Trial Science. I study the jury's behavioral patterns. I know what they're thinking before they do. Everything my team learns gets plugged into a matrix, which allows us to assemble a shadow jury that is scary in its predictive efficiency. The verdict you get depends on me. And that's no bull."

== Cast and characters ==
=== Main ===
- Michael Weatherly as Dr. Jason Bull, a psychologist and holder of three Ph.D.s in psychology, as well as a pilot's license, who now owns and operates Trial Analysis Corporation (TAC). He hates lawyers himself due to failing the bar exam twice (though he does technically possess a JD), crushing his dream of becoming a lawyer, and he had a difficult childhood.
- Freddy Rodriguez as Benjamin "Benny" Colón (seasons 1–5), Bull's former brother-in-law, Izzy's younger brother, a former NYC prosecutor, and TAC's in-house counsel. In season 5, he leaves TAC to run for District Attorney, only to halt his campaign when he discovers the incumbent DA is being framed. Between seasons 5 and 6, Benny leaves New York to marry a woman he has only dated a month, and moves to Rome, Italy with her.
- Geneva Carr as Marissa Morgan, a psychologist, neurolinguistics expert, second-in-command of Bull's team, and licensed sex therapist, who formerly worked at Homeland Security. She developed the predictive algorithm that TAC uses to select jurors and mirror jurors. In the season 2 finale, Marissa begins to question her dependency on Bull. In season 6, Marissa accepts an offer to become a partner in a rival company, and briefly leaves TAC.
- Christopher Jackson as Chester "Chunk" Palmer, a fashion stylist who formerly worked at Vogue and who, at the University of Georgia, was an All-American football defensive lineman. He prepares TAC's clients for court. From Season 2, he begins attending law school and establishes an unsteady connection with his previously unknown daughter, Anna. He passes the bar exam between seasons 4 and 5, and tries his first case with TAC in season 5. In season 6, he becomes lead attorney after Benny's departure.
- Jaime Lee Kirchner as Danielle "Danny" James, the team's lead investigator, who used to work as an NYPD detective in narcotics and for the FBI.
- Annabelle Attanasio as Cable McCrory (seasons 1–2), the team's computer expert who is also a skilled hacker. In the middle of season 2, Cable is briefly fired after breaking the law. However, when Cable secretly helps TAC obtain information relating to a case without telling them, Bull deduces this and works up the courage to offer her her job back. She is killed off-screen in the season 3 premiere when a bridge she is driving on collapses below her.
- MacKenzie Meehan as Taylor Rentzel (seasons 3–6), a cyber expert and Marissa's old colleague from Homeland Security. After Cable's death, Taylor is hired to fill her position. A divorced mother, Taylor insists to Bull before accepting the position that her son's needs will always come before TAC's. In Season 6, she undergoes a custody battle with her ex-husband, Erik, and Mauricio ends up entirely in her custody.
- Yara Martinez as Isabella "Izzy" Colón (recurring seasons 1–4; main seasons 5–6), Benny's sister who is also Bull's ex-wife. Bull and Izzy have a tryst while her second marriage is falling apart, which leads to Izzy getting pregnant and later giving birth to a daughter, Astrid. Subsequently, she and Bull remarry in the Season 5 finale.

=== Recurring ===
- Dena Tyler as Liberty Davis, a new lawyer who occasionally works with Bull's team on trials. With Bull's help, she gains respect and experience as a lawyer.
- Jill Flint as Diana Lindsay, a prominent lawyer from Texas with whom Bull has history, both professional and romantic.
- Gary Wilmes as Kyle Anderson/Robert Allen, Marissa's love interest in Season 2.
- Jazzy Williams (later billed as Jazzy Kae) as Anna Baker, Chunk's teenage daughter, whom we learn about in Season 2.
- David Furr as Greg Valerian, Marissa's ex-husband whom she remarries prior to Season 3. They split up again in Season 4, and finalize their divorce in season 5.
- Donovan Christie Jr. as Kenneth Kiehl, the ADA who convinces Benny to run for New York District Attorney in season 5, later assisting with Benny's campaign.
- Matt Dellapina as Erik Rentzel
- Ollie Robinson as Mauricio Rentzel
- Erich Bergen as ADA Robert Jones, Chunk's boyfriend in Season 6 who works at the DA's office.

== Episodes ==
Season	Episodes	Originally released		Rank	Average viewership (in millions)
Season	Episodes	First released	Last released	Rank	Average viewership (in millions)
1	23	September 20, 2016	May 23, 2017	5	15.21
2	22	September 26, 2017	May 8, 2018	8	14.37
3	22	September 24, 2018	May 13, 2019	16	11.98
4	20	September 23, 2019	May 4, 2020	13	10.61
5	16	November 16, 2020	May 17, 2021	16	8.59
6	22	October 7, 2021	May 26, 2022	22	7.37

== Production ==
=== Development ===
On February 2, 2016, it was announced that CBS had given the production a pilot order. The episode was written by Dr. Phil McGraw and Paul Attanasio, who executive produced alongside Jay McGraw, Justin Falvey, Darryl Frank, Mark Goffman, Steven Spielberg, and Rodrigo Garcia. Production companies involved with the pilot include Amblin Television, Atelier Paul Attanasio, Stage 29 Productions and CBS Television Studios. On May 13, 2016, CBS officially ordered the pilot to series. A few days later, it was announced that the series, would premiere in the fall of 2016 and air on Tuesdays at 9:00 P.M. On November 4, 2016, CBS picked up the series for a full season of 22 episodes. An additional episode was ordered in November. On March 23, 2017, CBS renewed the series for a second season. which premiered on September 26, 2017. On April 18, 2018, CBS renewed the series for a third season which is set to premiere on September 24, 2018. On May 9, 2019, it was announced that CBS renewed the series for a fourth season. On May 9, 2019, following the renewal, it was announced that executive producers Justin Falvey, Darryl Frank, and Steven Spielberg, along with his production company Amblin Television, would be departing the series after the third season following the harassment controversy surrounding series star Michael Weatherly. In May 2020, Bull was renewed for a fifth season, with the further announcement in October 2020 that the season would be trimmed to 16 episodes due to production schedules being shortened by the COVID-19 pandemic. On April 15, 2021, CBS renewed the series for a sixth season which premiered in October 2021. On January 18, 2022, it was reported that the sixth season will be the series' final season.

=== Casting ===
Michael Weatherly, Geneva Carr, Freddy Rodriguez, Chris Jackson and Jaime Lee Kirchner were part of the pilot's main cast. Annabelle Attanasio, a main cast member for the first two seasons, did not return for Season 3 in order to direct an independent film. MacKenzie Meehan was added to the Season 3 main cast, with her character filling a role very similar to the one previously played by Attanasio.

Eliza Dushku appeared in the final three episodes of the first season in a recurring role that was intended to become a regular role in Season 2. However, following a complaint Dushku made about Weatherly making sexually suggestive comments, she was fired. In December 2018, The New York Times reported that CBS reached a confidential settlement with Dushku which would pay her $9.5 million, her anticipated salary over four seasons as a regular cast member.

In May 2019, Amblin Television announced they will no longer produce the series, with Spielberg, Falvey, and Frank no longer serving as executive producers.

After appearing as a recurring character in the first four seasons, Yara Martinez was upgraded to series regular for season 5. On May 21, 2021, it was announced that Freddy Rodriguez would depart the series along with series producer and showrunner Glenn Gordon Caron. Two of the show's writers, Kathryn Price and Nichole Millard, took over as co-showrunners for season 6.

== Release ==
=== Broadcast ===
Bull aired on CBS from September 20, 2016 until May 26, 2022.

=== Syndication ===
Reruns of Bull aired on Ion Television since January 26, 2024.

== Reception ==
=== Critical response ===
On the review aggregator website Rotten Tomatoes, the show's first season has an approval rating of 22% based on 27 reviews, with an average rating of 4/10. The website's critical consensus reads: "Michael Weatherly's performance is top-notch, but not enough to save a show that relies too heavily on a well-worn series of legal show tropes and an off-putting premise." Metacritic, which uses a weighted average, assigned the season a score of 40 out of 100 based on 19 critics, indicating "mixed or average reviews".

=== Ratings ===
Viewership and ratings per season of Bull
Season	Timeslot (ET)	Episodes	First aired		Last aired		TV season	Viewership rank	Avg. viewers (millions)	18–49 rank	Avg. 18–49 rating
Season	Timeslot (ET)	Episodes	Date	Viewers (millions)	Date	Viewers (millions)	TV season	Viewership rank	Avg. viewers (millions)	18–49 rank	Avg. 18–49 rating
1	Tuesday 9:00 p.m.	23	September 20, 2016	15.56	May 23, 2017	8.54	2016–17	5	15.21	21	2.2
2	Tuesday 9:00 p.m.	22	September 26, 2017	10.06	May 8, 2018	11.76	2017–18	8	14.37	34	1.9
3	Monday 10:00 p.m.	22	September 24, 2018	7.33	May 13, 2019	7.19	2018–19	16	10.98	50	1.4
4	Monday 10:00 p.m.	20	September 23, 2019	6.42	May 4, 2020	6.87	2019–20	13	10.61	39	1.2
5	Monday 10:00 p.m.	16	November 16, 2020	4.47	May 17, 2021	5.08	2020–21	16	8.59	59	0.8
6	Thursday 10:00 p.m.	22	October 7, 2021	4.18	May 26, 2022	4.22	2021–22	TBD	TBD	TBD	TBD

== Accolades ==
In 2021, the season 4 episode "Off the Rails" was awarded the Epiphany Prize for Most Inspiring TV or Streaming Movie or Program at the Movieguide Awards.
