= 2026 Movieguide Awards =

Annual American film and television awards

The 2026 Movieguide Awards ceremony honored the best films and television of 2025. The ceremony was held on February 6, 2026, in the Avalon Theater in Los Angeles, California, U.S.A. It was televised on March 6, 2026 on Great American Family and streamed on Pure Flix.

== Winners and nominees ==
Winners are listed first, highlighted in boldface, and indicated with a double dagger (‡).

**Epiphany Prize for Most Inspiring Movie** - Honoring movies that are wholesome, spiritually uplifting and inspirational	**Epiphany Prize for Most Inspiring TV or Streaming Movie or Program**
**The Chosen: Last Supper - Part Two‡**; The Christmas Ring; David; The King of Kings; Light of the World	**A Christmas Prayer‡**; The Chosen Adventures: Episodes 1.1-1.6; House of David: Episode 208: "The Truth Revealed"; Man vs. Baby: Episodes 1.1-1.4; When Calls the Heart: Episode 12.2: "You Get What You Give"
**Faith and Freedom Award for Movies** - Honoring movies that promote positive American values	**Faith and Freedom Award for Television and Streaming**
**Bau: Artist at War‡**; The Fantastic Four: First Steps; Mission: Impossible – The Final Reckoning; Paddington in Peru; Sarah's Oil	**House of David: Episode 208: "The Truth Revealed"‡**; Boston Blue: Episode 1.8: "In the Name of the Father, and of the Son..."; The Christmas Spark; County Rescue: Episode 2.5: "Hot Water"; When Hope Calls: Episodes 2.3 and 2.4: "A New Beginning" and "So Long, Not Goodbye"
**Best Movie for Children**	**Best Television and Streaming for Children**
**Light of the World‡**; The King of Kings; Lilo & Stitch; Paddington in Peru; Zootopia 2	**Diary of a Wimpy Kid: The Last Straw‡**; Builder Brothers Dream Factory: Episodes 1.1-1.6; Dot Conner: Webtective; The Chosen Adventures: Episodes 1.1-1.6; Team Mekbots Animal Rescue: Episodes 2.1-2.4
**Best Movie for Families**	**Best Television for Families**
**The Last Rodeo‡**; The Chosen: Last Supper - Part Two; The Christmas Ring; David; The Senior	**Timeless Tidings of Joy‡**; Crossroad Springs: Episode 1.6: "Sunrise and Still Water"; Man vs. Baby: Episodes 1.1-1.4; When Calls the Heart: Episode 12.2: "You Get What You Give"; When Hope Calls: Episodes 2.3 and 2.4: "A New Beginning" and "So Long, Not Goodbye"
**Best Movie for Mature Audiences**	**Best Television for Mature Audiences**
**Sarah's Oil‡**; Bau: Artist at War; The Fantastic Four: First Steps; Mission: Impossible – The Final Reckoning; Superman	**Ruth & Boaz‡**; Boston Blue: Episode 1.8: "In the Name of the Father, and of the Son..."; NCIS: Episode 23.7: "God Only Knows"; House of David: Episode 208: "The Truth Revealed"; Martin Scorsese Presents: The Saints: "Peter"
**Grace Award for Most Inspiring Performance for Movies, Actor**	**Grace Award for Most Inspiring Performance for TV, Actor**
**Mykelti Williamson – The Last Rodeo‡**; Kelsey Grammer – The Christmas Ring; Oscar Isaac – The King of Kings; Zachary Levi – Sarah's Oil; Paras Patel – The Chosen: Last Supper - Part Two	**Michael Iskander – House of David: Episode 208: "The Truth Revealed"‡**; Rowan Atkinson – Man vs. Baby: Episodes 1.1-1.4; Trevor Donovan - Christmas at the Inn; Stephen Lang – House of David: Episode 208: "The Truth Revealed"; Tyler Lepley – Ruth & Boaz; Jonathan Stoddard – Crossroad Springs: Episode 1.6: "Sunrise and Still Water"
**Grace Award for Most Inspiring Performance for Movies, Actress**	**Grace Award for Most Inspiring Performance for TV, Actress**
**Naya Desir-Johnson – Sarah's Oil‡**; Vanessa Kirby – The Fantastic Four: First Steps; Rebekah Schafer – Light of the World; Jana Kramer – The Christmas Ring; Uma Thurman – The King of Kings	**Natasha Bure – Timeless Tidings of Joy‡**; Candace Cameron Bure – Timeless Tidings of Joy; Erin Krakow – When Calls the Heart: Episode 12.2: "You Get What You Give"; Danica McKellar - Have We Met This Christmas?; Shae Robins – A Christmas Prayer; Serayah – Ruth & Boaz
**Aletheia Award for Best Documentary**	
**Investigating the Supernatural: Miracles‡**; The Case for Miracles; Dude Perfect: The Hero Tour; Kevin Costner Presents: The First Christmas; Mears: How One Woman Changed Christianity	

=== Multiple wins / nominations ===
Wins	Nominations	Movie
2	4	Sarah's Oil
2	2	The Last Rodeo
1	3	Light of the World
1	3	The Chosen: Last Supper - Part Two
1	2	Bau: Artist at War
0	4	The King of Kings
0	4	The Christmas Ring
0	3	The Fantastic Four: First Steps
0	2	Paddington in Peru
0	2	David
0	2	Mission: Impossible – The Final Reckoning

Wins	Nominations	TV series
2	5	House of David: Episode 208: "The Truth Revealed"
2	3	Timeless Tidings of Joy
1	3	Ruth & Boaz
1	2	A Christmas Prayer
0	3	Man vs. Baby: Episodes 1.1-1.4
0	3	When Calls the Heart: Episode 12.2: "You Get What You Give"
0	2	The Chosen Adventures: Episodes 1.1-1.6
0	2	Crossroad Springs: Episode 1.6: "Sunrise and Still Water"
0	2	When Hope Calls: Episodes 2.3 and 2.4: "A New Beginning" and "So Long, Not Goodbye"
0	2	Boston Blue: Episode 1.8: "In the Name of the Father, and of the Son..."
