= 2023 Movieguide Awards =

Annual American movie and television awards

The 2023 Movieguide Awards ceremony honored the best films and television of 2022.

== Winners and nominees ==
Winners are listed first, highlighted in boldface, and indicated with a double dagger (‡).

**Epiphany Prize for Most Inspiring Movie** - Honoring movies that are wholesome, spiritually uplifting and inspirational	**Epiphany Prize for Most Inspiring TV or Streaming Movie or Program**
**The Chosen: Episodes 3.1 and 3.2: "Homecoming" and "Two by Two"**‡; Father Stu: Reborn; Resistance: 1942; Running the Bases; Uncharted	**Dolly Parton's Mountain Magic Christmas**‡; Blood and Treasure: Season Two; A Christmas... Present; The Lord of the Rings: The Rings of Power: Episode 1.8: "Alloyed"; Rise
**Faith and Freedom Award for Movies** - Honoring movies that promote positive American values	**Faith and Freedom Award for Television and Streaming**
**Running the Bases**‡; Devotion; Mrs. Harris Goes to Paris; Resistance: 1942; Top Gun: Maverick	**A Waltons Thanksgiving**‡; Blood and Treasure: Season Two; Blue Bloods: Episode 12.20: "Silver Linings"; The Lord of the Rings: The Rings of Power: Episode 1.8: "Alloyed"; Rise; Star Wars: Andor: Episode 1.12: "Rix Road"
**Best Movie for Families**	**Best Television for Families**
**Puss in Boots: The Last Wish**‡ (tie); **Sonic The Hedgehog 2**‡ (tie); The Chosen: Episodes 3.1 and 3.2: "Homecoming" and "Two by Two"; Lyle, Lyle Crocodile; Marcel the Shell With Shoes On	**A Christmas... Present**‡; Instant Dream Home: Episode 1.8: "Four Years in One Day"; Reba Mcentire: My Chains are Gone; Rescued by Ruby; A Waltons Thanksgiving; The Wingfeather Saga: Chapter 1: "Leeli & the Sea Dragon Song"
**Best Movie for Mature Audiences**	**Best Television for Mature Audiences**
**Resistance: 1942**‡; Father Stu: Reborn; Jurassic World: Dominion; Mrs. Harris Goes to Paris; Top Gun: Maverick; Uncharted	**The Lord of the Rings: The Rings of Power: Episode 1.8: "Alloyed"**‡; Blood and Treasure: Season Two; Comenius: Life and Legacy of John Amos Comenius; Star Wars: Andor: Episode 1.12: "Rix Road"; Styled With Love
**Most Inspirational Independent Movie**	**Most Inspirational Independent Streaming/Television**
**Family Camp**‡; I Heard The Bells; The Mulligan; Resistance: 1942; Running the Bases	**5000 Blankets**‡; Comenius: Life And Legacy of John Amos Comenius; David; Legacy Peak; Why the Nativity?
**Grace Award for Most Inspiring Performance for Movies**	**Grace Award for Most Inspiring Performance for TV**
**Pat Boone - The Mulligan**‡; Mark Wahlberg - Father Stu: Reborn; Stephen Atherholt - I Heard The Bells; Cary Elwes - Resistance: 1942; Brett Varvel - Running the Bases	**Candace Cameron Bure - A Christmas... Present**‡; Reba McEntire - My Chains are Gone; Mark Gagliardi - Blood and Treasure; Dolly Parton - Mountain Magic Christmas; Jonathan Roumie - The Chosen: Episode 3.3: "Physician, Heal Yourself"
