= 2024 Movieguide Awards =

Annual American movie and television awards

The 2024 Movieguide Awards ceremony honored the best films and television of 2023.

== Winners and nominees ==
Winners are listed first, highlighted in boldface, and indicated with a double dagger (‡).

**Epiphany Prize for Most Inspiring Movie** - Honoring movies that are wholesome, spiritually uplifting and inspirational	**Epiphany Prize for Most Inspiring TV or Streaming Movie or Program**
**Journey to Bethlehem**‡; After Death; Big George Foreman; On a Wing and a Prayer; Jesus Revolution	**Divine Influencer**‡; A Paris Christmas Waltz; A Christmas Blessing; A Thousand Tomorrows: Episodes 1.1-1.3: "Untouchable," "Hooked," and "What No One Knows"; Murf the Surf: Jewels, Jesus and Mayhem in the USA: Episodes 1.1-1.4: "The Heist," "Another Level of Madness," "God’s Business," and "The Truth Bends"
**Faith and Freedom Award for Movies** - Honoring movies that promote positive American values	**Faith and Freedom Award for Television and Streaming**
**Sound of Freedom**‡; Bank of Dave; Golda; Indiana Jones and the Dial of Destiny; Guy Ritchie's The Covenant	**A Million Miles Away**‡; All the Light We Cannot See; The Mandalorian: "Chapter 18: The Mines of Mandalore"; Murf The Surf: Jewels, Jesus and Mayhem in the USA: Episodes 1.1-1.4: "The Heist," "Another Level of Madness," "God’s Business," and "The Truth Bends"; Tetris
**Best Movie for Families**	**Best Television for Families**
**The Super Mario Bros. Movie**‡; Wonka; Trolls Band Together; Journey to Bethlehem; Spider-Man: Across the Spider-Verse	**A Paris Christmas Waltz**‡; A Christmas Blessing; Divine Influencer; A Thousand Tomorrows: Episodes 1.1-1.3: "Untouchable," "Hooked," and "What No One Knows"; A Million Miles Away
**Best Movie for Mature Audiences**	**Best Television for Mature Audiences**
**Jesus Revolution**‡; Godzilla Minus One; The Boys in the Boat; Sound of Freedom; Guardians of the Galaxy Vol. 3	**Chicago P.D.: Episode 10.21: "New Life"**‡; Reacher: Episode 2.5: "Burial"; The Burial; All the Light We Cannot See; Murf the Surf: Jewels, Jesus and Mayhem in the USA: Episodes 1.1-1.4: "The Heist," "Another Level of Madness," "God’s Business," and "The Truth Bends"
**Grace Award for Most Inspiring Performance for Movies**	**Grace Award for Most Inspiring Performance for TV**
**Dennis Quaid – On A Wing And A Prayer**‡; Khris Davis – Big George Foreman; Forest Whitaker – Big George Foreman; Kelsey Grammer – Jesus Revolution; Joel Courtney – Jesus Revolution; Anna Grace Barlow – Jesus Revolution; Fiona Palomo – Journey to Bethlehem; Joel Smallbone – Journey to Bethlehem	**Lori Loughlin – A Christmas Blessing**‡; Jesse Hutch – A Christmas Blessing; Colin Ford – A Thousand Tomorrows; Rose Reid – A Thousand Tomorrows; Jason Burkey – Divine Influencer; Lara Silva – Divine Influencer
