= Movieguide Award for Best Television for Mature Audiences =

Annual American television award

Every year Movieguide gives an award to the Best Television for Mature Audiences.

== Winners and nominees ==
Winners are listed first and highlighted in boldface.

TV Year	Ceremony Year	Winner / Nominees	Source
**2022**	**2023**	**The Lord of the Rings: The Rings of Power: Episode 1.8: "Alloyed"**; Blood and Treasure: Season Two; Comenius: Life and Legacy of John Amos Comenius; Star Wars: Andor: Episode 1.12: "Rix Road"; Styled With Love	
**2023**	**2024**	**Chicago P.D.: Episode 10.21: "New Life"**; Reacher: Episode 2.5: "Burial"; The Burial; All the Light We Cannot See; Murf the Surf: Jewels, Jesus and Mayhem in the USA: Episodes 1.1-1.4: "The Heist," "Another Level of Madness," "God’s Business," and "The Truth Bends"	
**2024**	**2025**	**The Baxters: Episodes 1.1-1.8**; The Bloody Hundredth; Blue Bloods: Episode 14:10: "The Heart of a Saturday Night"; NCIS: Episode 22:4: "Sticks & Stones"; Quiet on Set: The Dark Side of Kids TV	
**2025**	**2026**	**Ruth & Boaz**; Boston Blue: Episode 1.8: "In the Name of the Father, and of the Son…"; NCIS: Episode 23.7: "God Only Knows"; House of David: Episode 208: "The Truth Revealed"; Martin Scorsese Presents: The Saints: "Peter"	
