= Movieguide Award for Best Television for Families =

Annual American television award

Every year Movieguide gives an award to the Best Television for Families.

== Winners and nominees ==
Winners are listed first and highlighted in boldface.

TV Year	Ceremony Year	Winner / Nominees	Source
**2022**	**2023**	**A Christmas… Present**; Instant Dream Home: Episode 1.8: "Four Years in One Day"; Reba Mcentire: My Chains are Gone; Rescued by Ruby; A Waltons Thanksgiving; The Wingfeather Saga: Chapter 1: "Leeli & the Sea Dragon Song"	
**2023**	**2024**	**A Paris Christmas Waltz**; A Christmas Blessing; Divine Influencer; A Thousand Tomorrows: Episodes 1.1-1.3: "Untouchable," "Hooked," and "What No One Knows"; A Million Miles Away	
**2024**	**2025**	**A Little Women's Christmas**; Bluey: Episodes 3.48 and 3.49: "Ghostbasket" and "The Sign"; The Chosen: Season 4; A Christmas Less Traveled; Christmas Under the Northern Lights; County Rescue: Episode 1.5: "The Rescuer"	
**2025**	**2026**	**Timeless Tidings of Joy**; Crossroad Springs: Episode 1.6: "Sunrise and Still Water"; Man vs. Baby: Episodes 1.1-1.4; When Calls the Heart: Episode 12.2: "You Get What You Give"; When Hope Calls: Episodes 2.3 and 2.4: "A New Beginning" and "So Long, Not Goodbye"	
