= Woman Thou Art Loosed =

2004 film directed by Michael Schultz

- Theatrical release poster
- Directed by: Michael Schultz
- Screenplay by: Stan Foster
- Based on: Woman Thou Art Loosed by T. D. Jakes
- Produced by: Stan Foster; Reuben Cannon
- Starring: Kimberly Elise; Loretta Devine; Debbi Morgan; Michael Boatman; Clifton Powell; Idalis DeLeon; Bishop T. D. Jakes
- Cinematography: Reinhart Peschke
- Edited by: Billy Fox
- Music by: Todd Cochran
- Distributed by: Magnolia Pictures
- Release date: October 1, 2004
- Running time: 94 minutes
- Country: United States
- Language: English
- Budget: $3 million
- Box office: $6.8 million

Woman Thou Art Loosed is a 2004 American drama film directed by Michael Schultz and written by Stan Foster. It was produced by Stan Foster and Reuben Cannon. It is the 44th film or series directed by Schultz and is adapted from the self-help novel by T. D. Jakes. The film tells the story of a young woman who must come to terms with a long history of sexual abuse, drug addiction, and poverty. It has been reported that the story was loosely based on the screenwriter's past relationship with a college girlfriend. A gospel stage play, written, directed, and produced by Tyler Perry, preceded the film.

== Plot ==
Michelle Jordan, a former inmate, is granted probation and released to a halfway house. As one of the conditions for her probation, she attends revival services at West Angeles Church of God in Christ in Los Angeles where Bishop Jakes is preaching. Once inside the sanctuary, she runs into family friend Twana and old childhood friend Todd, recently divorced from his wife Keisha whom everyone in high school said looked just like Michelle. When Bishop Jakes questions Michelle on her mother Cassey's intentions Michelle states she is unsure, and separate flashbacks show Cassey's life has not been pleasant either. Cassey's boyfriend Reggie is an alcoholic and drug addict who owes money to a local dealer, and constantly criticizes Cassey for going to Revival. After Reggie comes clean about his drug addiction, Cassey again asks if the incident in which Michelle said that he had sexually assaulted her as a child had ever occurred, which he continues to deny. After a violent run-in with Pervis, her former pimp, at the halfway house, her friend and former coworker Nicole rescues her and gives her a gun in case she ever runs into trouble again. In the meantime, Todd reveals to Michelle that he has always had feelings for her.

On the last night of the revival, Michelle arrives at West Angeles to discover Reggie there with Cassey. Reggie claims he is there to ask God for forgiveness, and as he tries to apologize to Michelle and approach her for a hug during altar call, an enraged Michelle shoots and kills him at the altar with the gun Nicole gave her. We cut back to present day where it is revealed that Michelle is on death row for Reggie's murder. She tells Bishop Jakes that what she did was wrong and asks him to tell Cassey that she loves her, despite everything that has happened. Bishop Jakes tells Michelle that he has been praying for her, and he says that she will be alright before he leaves. Throughout the film, when the flashbacks are cut back to present day, we see Michelle designing a small wooden house out of popsicle sticks. This house is a representation of Michelle as an individual. She initially questions putting a window on the house, but Bishop Jakes gives her the symbolic nature of the window as an opportunity. Bishop Jakes then questions where the door is, although Michelle had not placed one. After his departure, it is shown in a new present day that Michelle's cell is now empty, implying that Michelle has been executed. However, the film ends with a shot in the cell of the house, which now has a door. The film's end credits state that although Michelle was a fictional character, this type of story does actually happen, and the website womanthouartloosed.com is displayed.

== Cast ==
- Kimberly Elise as Michelle Jordan
  - Destiny Edmond as Michelle at age 12
  - Jordan Moseley as Michelle at age 8
- Loretta Devine as Cassey Jordan
- Debbie Morgan as Twana
- Michael Boatman as Todd
  - Philip Bolden as Todd at age 8
- Clifton Powell as Reggie
- Idalis DeLeon as Nicole
- Porscha Coleman as Lil' Bit
- T. D. Jakes as Himself
- Sean Blakemore as Pervis
- Maula Gale as Church Goer
- Ellia English as Prison Guard

== Reception ==
On review aggregate website Rotten Tomatoes, Women Thou Art Loosed has a 51% approval rating based on 59 reviews. The site's critics consensus reads, "While Woman is a little less heavy-handed than other message movies, it still feels like an After School Special."

In USA Today, Claudia Puig wrote, "A movie based on a self-help novel is an iffy proposition, but Kimberly Elise's performance raises Woman Thou Art Loosed to a compelling drama about a young woman's lifetime of abuse, addiction, imprisonment and poverty." Ann Hornaday of The Washington Post added Elise "carries the film in a role that asks her to be sullen, haunted, wounded and radiant...[taking] command of the screen with power and assurance as a young woman at war within her own nature between rage and repentance."

== Awards ==
The film was nominated for two NAACP Image Awards, winning the award for Outstanding Independent or Foreign Film. Elise and Devine received nominations at the Independent Spirit Awards for Best Female Lead and Best Supporting Female, respectively. At the Black Reel Awards, Elise won for Best Actress in an Independent Film and Michael Schultz won for Best Director of an Independent Film.

Woman Thou Art Loosed was also awarded at the American Black Film Festival for Best Film.

== Sequel ==
A sequel, titled Woman Thou Art Loosed: On the 7th Day, was released on April 13, 2012.
