= Maura Gale =

American actress

- Other name: Maula Gale
- Occupations: Actress; author; producer; radio host; singer; voice actress
- Website: www.mauragale.com

Maura Gale (sometimes credited as Maula Gale) is an American actress who is best known for her voice role in Metal Gear Solid 2: Sons of Liberty as Fortune. She has also voiced video games like Enter the Matrix, as well as providing the female voice of Guillo in the GameCube RPG Baten Kaitos Origins. Alongside that, she has recurring, guest star and/or co-star appearances on TV shows such as House of Payne, Chicago Med, Kingdom Business, Love and Murder, Ordinary Joe, Amazing Stories, Dynasty, Bigger, Saints & Sinners, Strong Medicine, NYPD Blue, and Ally McBeal, and in films, An Abduction at an HBCU, The Manifestation, The Wake Up Call, Under the Stadium Lights, Woman Thou Art Loosed, Their Eyes Were Watching God and Supreme Sanction. She hosts a weekly radio show and podcast, ‘’OMG Oh Maura Gale Radio Show’’ and is a co-producer, co-star and co-writer of the award-winning docudramedy film STEM The Movement.

In 2007 Gale performed in the Alabama Shakespeare Festival's touring production of Gee's Bend.

== Filmography ==
=== Film ===
Year	Title	Role	Notes
1997	Love & Fate	Claudia	
1999	Mr. Right Now!	Lola	Direct-to-video
2000	Daughter of Sin		
2004	Woman Thou Art Loosed	Church Goer	
2005	Their Eyes Were Watching God	Lula Moss	Television film
2013	Metal Gear Solid 2: Digital Graphic Novel	Fortune	Direct-to-video
2017	STEM the Movement	Herself	Best Documentary at the Oktober Film Festival
2021	Under the Stadium Lights	Drucila Christian	

=== Television ===
Year	Title	Role	Notes
2000	Ally McBeal	Foreperson	Episode: "Girls' Night Out"
2002	NYPD Blue	Natalie Inniss	Episode: "Safari, So Good"
2005	Strong Medicine	Latesha	Episode: "Rhythm of the Heart"
2018–19	Saints & Sinners	Gloria Stewart	7 episodes
2019–20	Dynasty	Judge Ruth Matthews	2 episodes
2019	Bigger	Teacher	Episode: "Baby Steps"
2020	Amazing Stories	Black American Woman	Episode: "The Heart"
2022	Ordinary Joe	Pam	Episode: "Calling an Audible"
2022	Kingdom Business	Dani’s Mom	3 episodes

=== Video games ===
Year	Title	Role	Notes
2001	Metal Gear Solid 2: Sons of Liberty	Fortune	
2003	Enter the Matrix		
2006	Baten Kaitos Origins	Guillo (Female)	
