= Naya Desir-Johnson =

American child actress

- Born: United States of America
- Occupation: Actress
- Years active: 2018 - present

Naya Desir-Johnson is a Haitian-American actress and singer. She is best known for her breakout role as the titular character in Sarah's Oil (2025).

== Career ==
Desir-Johnson began her career in performing arts at a young age, making her professional stage debut as Astyanax in the 2018 production of Trojan Women.

Desir-Johnson made her television debut as Kelsey in the CBS series The Equalizer alongside Queen Latifah. She followed this with a role as Cynthia in the FX series Pose, working with Billy Porter. In the world of opera, she performed as a vocalist alongside Grammy Award-winner Joyce DiDonato in the Metropolitan Opera's production of Dead Man Walking, directed by Ivo van Hove.

Desir-Johnson made her feature film debut in the 2023 Sundance Grand Jury Prize-winning film A Thousand and One, directed by A.V. Rockwell.

In 2025, Desir-Johnson received critical acclaim for her leading role as Sarah Rector in the Amazon MGM Studios film Sarah's Oil. The film, directed by Cyrus Nowrasteh and executive produced by Ciara and Russell Wilson, tells the true story of an 11-year-old Black girl in early 20th-century Oklahoma who became one of the nation's first female Black millionaires. Variety praised her performance, noting the film was "propelled by newcomer Naya Desir-Johnson's perfect-pitch performance." Her performance earned her several honors, including a Rising Star Award from the Critics Choice Association, a Movieguide Award and an NAACP Image Award.

Desir-Johnson is slated to star in the title role of Angie, the debut feature film from director Mirta Desir.

=== Film ===
Feature film appearances
| Year | Title | Role | Notes | Ref. |
|---|---|---|---|---|
| 2023 | A Thousand and One | Foster Sister | | |
| 2025 | Sarah's Oil | Sarah Rector | Lead role | |
| 2026 | Angie † | Angie | Post-production | |

=== Television ===
| Year | Title | Role | Notes | Ref. |
|---|---|---|---|---|
| 2021 | The Equalizer | Kelsey Lee | | |
| 2021 | Pose | Cynthia | | |

== Accolades ==
| Award | Year | Category | Nominated work | Result | Ref. |
|---|---|---|---|---|---|
| Black Reel Awards | 2026 | Outstanding Breakthrough Performance | Sarah's Oil | Nominated | |
| Celebration of Cinema and Television | 2025 | Rising Star – Film | Sarah's Oil | Won | |
| Movieguide Awards | 2026 | Grace Award for Most Inspiring Performance for Movies, Actress | Sarah's Oil | Won | |
| NAACP Image Awards | 2026 | Outstanding Youth Performance in a Motion Picture | Sarah's Oil | Won | |

== See also ==
- Sarah's Oil
