= Duplicity (2025 film) =

2025 film by Tyler Perry

- Release poster
- Directed by: Tyler Perry
- Written by: Tyler Perry
- Produced by: Dianne Ashford; Will Areu; Angi Bones; Tyler Perry
- Starring: Kat Graham; Meagan Tandy; Tyler Lepley; RonReaco Lee
- Cinematography: Cory Burmester
- Edited by: Larry Sexton
- Music by: Wow Jones; JimiJame$
- Production companies: Amazon MGM Studios; Tyler Perry Studios
- Distributed by: Amazon Prime Video
- Release date: March 20, 2025
- Running time: 109 minutes
- Country: United States
- Language: English

Duplicity (marketed as Tyler Perry's Duplicity), is a 2025 American mystery thriller film written, produced, and directed by Tyler Perry. The film stars Kat Graham, Meagan Tandy, Tyler Lepley and RonReaco Lee.

The film was released on Amazon Prime Video on March 20, 2025.

== Premise ==
High powered lawyer Marley is tasked with solving the case of the shooting of her friend Fela's husband Rodney, an unarmed Black man. As she delves into the mystery together with her boyfriend, who works as a detective, she is sent down a maze of lies, deception, betrayal and duplicity.

== Cast ==
- Kat Graham as Marley Wells
- Meagan Tandy as Fela Blackburn
- Tyler Lepley as Tony
- RonReaco Lee as Kevin
- Joshua Adeyeye as Rodney
- Nick Barrotta as Sam
- Jimi Stanton as Caleb
- Shannon LaNier as Shannon

== Production ==
In June 2023, it was announced that Perry worked on his first film under a four feature film deal with Amazon Studios. Kat Graham, Tyler Lepley, Meagan Tandy, Josh Adeyeye RonReaco Lee, Jimi Stanton, Shannon LaNier and Nick Barrotta were cast in the movie.

== Reception ==
The film received negative reviews from critics. Critics from Variety and The Huffington Post called it a soap opera.
