= Sarah Rector =

Aboriginal American member of the Muscogee (Creek) Nation

- Born: March 3, 1902; Indian Territory (now Taft, Oklahoma, U.S.)
- Died: July 22, 1967 (aged 65); Kansas City, Missouri, U.S.
- Resting place: Blackjack Cemetery, Taft, Oklahoma, U.S.
- Education: Tuskegee University
- Spouses: Kenneth Campbell (m. 1920–1930); William Crawford (m. 1934)
- Children: 3

Sarah Rector, also known as Sarah Rector Campbell and Sarah Campbell Crawford, (March 3, 1902 – July 22, 1967) was an American oil magnate since childhood. Under the Treaty of 1866, due to her birthright as a Black Creek Indian born before the American Civil War, she received an allotment. It was discovered to be oil-rich and produced over US$300 (equivalent to $10,400 in 2025) per day, so she was known as the "Richest Colored Girl in the World".

== Biography ==
=== Early life and family ===
Sarah Rector was born in 1902 near the all-black town of Taft, located in Indian Territory. In 1907, it was absorbed as the eastern portion of the new state of Oklahoma. She had five siblings. Her parents were Rose McQueen and husband Joseph Rector (both born 1881), who were the grandchildren of Black Creek Indians enslaved before the Civil War. Their ancestors became members of the Muscogee Creek Nation after the Treaty of 1866. As such, they and their descendants were listed as Freedmen on the Dawes Rolls. They were entitled to land allotments under the Treaty of 1866 made by the United States with the Five Civilized Tribes. Because these tribes had allied with the Confederacy, the US required new treaties by which their slaves were freed and became citizens of these nations. This paralleled the abolition of slavery in the US.

Sarah's father Joseph was the son of John Rector, a Creek Freedman. John Rector's father, Benjamin McQueen, had been enslaved by Reilly Grayson, a Creek Indian. John Rector's mother, Mollie McQueen, was enslaved by Muscogee chief Opothleyahola, who fought in the Seminole Wars and split with the tribe. He moved with his slaves and followers to Kansas.

Each member of the Rector household received headrights allotments as Creek land was distributed among members. Sarah Rector was allotted 159.14 acres (64 hectares). The breakup of communal lands was a way to extinguish tribal rights in the process of integration of the Indian Territory with Oklahoma Territory to form what became the State of Oklahoma in 1907.

=== Oil strike and wealth ===
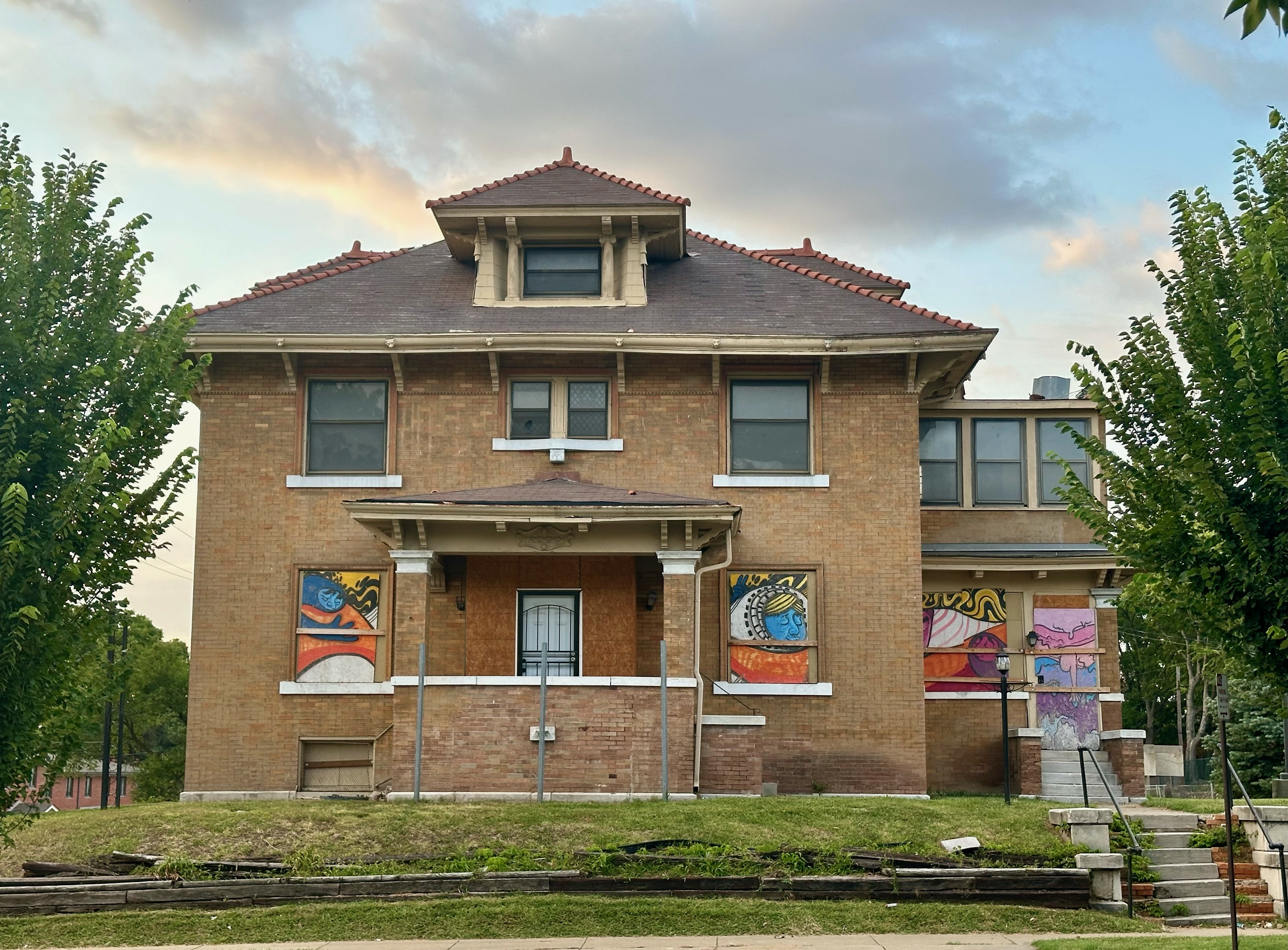
The historical house of Sarah Rector is at 2000 E 12th St in Kansas City, Missouri.

The parcel allotted to Sarah Rector was located in Glenpool, 60 miles (97 km) from the Rector family home. Its infertile soil was considered unsuitable for farming, with better land being reserved for white settlers and Creek members of the tribe.

The Rector family lived simply but not in poverty; however, the $30 (equivalent to $1,000 in 2025) annual property tax on Sarah's parcel was such a burden that her father petitioned the Muskogee County Court to sell the land. His petition was denied because of certain restrictions placed on the land, so he was required to continue paying the taxes.

To help cover this expense, in February 1911, Joseph Rector leased Sarah's parcel to the Standard Oil Company. In 1913, the independent oil driller B.B. Jones sank what became a "gusher" well, with a daily yield of 2,500 barrels (400 m^{3}) of oil and US$300 (equivalent to $10,400 in 2025) of income. Oklahoma law at the time required assignment of "well-respected" whites to act as guardians for full-blooded Indians, black adults, and children who were citizens of Indian Territory with significant property and money.

Thus, as soon as Sarah began to receive this windfall from oil drilling, there was pressure to change her guardianship from her parents to a local white resident. A family acquaintance named T.J. (or J.T.) Porter was chosen. Her allotment subsequently became part of the Cushing-Drumright Oil Field. In October 1913, she received royalties of $11,567 (equivalent to $377,000 in 2025).

As news of Rector's wealth spread worldwide, she received requests for loans, money gifts, and marriage proposals, although she was only 11 years old. Due to her wealth, in 1913, the Oklahoma Legislature made an effort to have her declared an honorary white, allowing her the benefits of elevated social standing in the segregated society, such as riding first-class on trains.

In 1914, the African-American journal, The Chicago Defender, began to take an interest in Rector, just as rumors began that she was a white immigrant who was being kept in poverty. The newspaper published an article claiming mismanagement by the white guardians of her estate. National African-American leaders Booker T. Washington and W. E. B. Du Bois both became concerned about Rector's welfare. In June 1914, a special agent for the National Association for the Advancement of Colored People (NAACP), James C. Waters Jr., sent a memo to Du Bois regarding her situation. Waters had been corresponding with the Bureau of Indian Affairs and the United States Children's Bureau over concerns regarding the mismanagement of Rector's estate. He wrote of her white financial guardian: "Is it not possible to have her cared for in a decent manner and by people of her own race, instead of by a member of a race which would deny her and her kind the treatment accorded a good yard dog?"

This prompted Du Bois to establish the Children's Department of the NAACP, which investigated claims of white guardians who were suspected of depriving black children of their land and wealth. Washington also intervened to help the Rector family. In October of that year, Sarah was enrolled in the Children's School, a boarding school at the Tuskegee Institute in Alabama, headed by Washington. Upon graduation, she attended the Institute.

==== Adulthood ====
Rector was a millionaire by the time she turned 18 in 1920. She owned stocks, bonds, a boarding house, businesses, and a 2,000-acre (810 ha) piece of prime river bottomland. At that time, she left Tuskegee and moved with her family to Kansas City, Missouri. She purchased a house on 12th Street.

Rector enjoyed her wealth, with a comfortable life and a taste for fine clothing and cars. She hosted lavish parties and entertained celebrities such as Count Basie and Duke Ellington.

Like many others, Rector lost most of her wealth during the Great Depression, and had to sell the mansion. But, she remained solvent and lived comfortably for the rest of her life.

=== Death ===
She died on July 22, 1967, at the age of 65. She is interred in Blackjack Cemetery in her childhood hometown of Taft.

== Personal life ==
Soon after moving to Kansas City, when she was 17 or 18, she married local businessman Kenneth Campbell in 1920. The wedding was a very private affair with only her mother and Campbell's paternal grandmother present. The couple had three sons, Kenneth (born 1925), Leonard (born 1926), and Clarence (born 1929), and they divorced in 1930. In 1934, she married restaurant owner William Crawford, and they remained together until her death in 1967.

== Legacy ==
Rector's house in Kansas City, known as the Rector House, was purchased in the 2010s by United Inner City Services, a nonprofit organization for historical and cultural preservation.

== In media ==
Sarah Rector's fight for her oil wealth was adapted into the film Sarah's Oil, shot primarily in Okmulgee, Oklahoma in mid-2024. Rector was portrayed by Naya Desir-Johnson.

== See also ==
- Osage Indian murders, about oil wealth in Indian Territory
