= 2025 Movieguide Awards =

Annual American film and television awards

The 2025 Movieguide Awards ceremony honored the best films and television of 2024. The ceremony was held on February 7, 2025 in the Avalon Theater in Los Angeles, California. It was televised on March 6, 2025 on Great American Family and streamed on Pure Flix.

== Winners and nominees ==
Winners are listed first, highlighted in boldface, and indicated with a double dagger (‡).

**Epiphany Prize for Most Inspiring Movie** - Honoring movies that are wholesome, spiritually uplifting and inspirational	**Epiphany Prize for Most Inspiring TV or Streaming Movie or Program**
**Cabrini**‡; The Best Christmas Pageant Ever; Sound of Hope: The Story of Possum Trot; Transformers One; Unsung Hero	**A Christmas Less Traveled**‡; The Baxters: Episodes 1.1-1.8; Christmas Under the Northern Lights; County Rescue: Episode 1.5: "The Rescuer"; A Little Women's Christmas
**Faith and Freedom Award for Movies** - Honoring movies that promote positive American values	**Faith and Freedom Award for Television and Streaming**
**Reagan**‡; Bonhoeffer; Cabrini; God's Not Dead: In God We Trust; Sound of Hope: The Story of Possum Trot	**NCIS: Episode 22:4: "Sticks & Stones"**‡; Blue Bloods: Episode 14:10: "The Heart of a Saturday Night"; County Rescue: Episode 1.5: "The Rescuer"; Masters of the Air: Episodes 1 and 2: "Part One" and "Part Two"; Quiet on Set: The Dark Side of Kids TV
**Best Movie for Families**	**Best Television for Families**
**The Best Christmas Pageant Ever**‡; Despicable Me 4; Inside Out 2; Mufasa: The Lion King; The Wild Robot	**A Little Women's Christmas**‡; Bluey: Episodes 3.48 and 3.49: "Ghostbasket" and "The Sign"; The Chosen: Season 4; A Christmas Less Traveled; Christmas Under the Northern Lights; County Rescue: Episode 1.5: "The Rescuer"
**Best Movie for Mature Audiences**	**Best Television for Mature Audiences**
**Young Woman and the Sea**‡; Dune: Part Two; Kingdom of the Planet of the Apes; Twisters; Unsung Hero	**The Baxters: Episodes 1.1-1.8**‡; The Bloody Hundredth; Blue Bloods: Episode 14:10: "The Heart of a Saturday Night"; NCIS: Episode 22:4: "Sticks & Stones"; Quiet on Set: The Dark Side of Kids TV
**Grace Award for Most Inspiring Performance for Movies, Actor**	**Grace Award for Most Inspiring Performance for TV, Actor**
**Joel David Smallbone – Unsung Hero**‡; Jonas Dassler – Bonhoeffer: Pastor. Spy. Assassin.; Demetrius Grosse – Sound of Hope: The Story of Possum Trot	**Jesse Hutch – Christmas Under the Northern Lights**‡; Riley Hough – County Rescue: Episode 1.5: "The Rescuer"; Tom Selleck – Blue Bloods: Episode 14:10: "The Heart of a Saturday Night"
**Grace Award for Most Inspiring Performance for Movies, Actress**	**Grace Award for Most Inspiring Performance for TV, Actress**
**Beatrice Schneider – The Best Christmas Pageant Ever**‡; Cristiana Dell'Anna – Cabrini; Daisy Betts – Unsung Hero; Lupita Nyong'o – The Wild Robot	**Candace Cameron Bure – A Christmas Less Traveled**‡; Julia Reilly – County Rescue: Episode 1.5: "The Rescuer"; Jillian Murray – A Little Women's Christmas
**Aletheia Award for Best Documentary**
**Americans with No Address: The Documentary**‡; The Blue Angels; The Bloody Hundredth; Foundations of the West: Episode III: "Christ, The Center of the World"; Quiet on Set: The Dark Side of Kids TV
