= Movieguide Aletheia Award for Best Documentary =

Annual American movie award

Every year Movieguide gives the Aletheia Award to the Best Documentary.

== Winners and nominees ==
Winners are listed first and highlighted in boldface.

Movie Year	Ceremony Year	Winner / Nominees	Source
**2024**	**2025**	**Americans with No Address: The Documentary**; The Blue Angels; The Bloody Hundredth; Foundations of the West: Episode III: "Christ, The Center of the World"; Quiet on Set: The Dark Side of Kids TV	
**2025**	**2026**	**Investigating the Supernatural: Miracles**; The Case for Miracles; Dude Perfect: The Hero Tour; Kevin Costner Presents: The First Christmas; Mears: How One Woman Changed Christianity	
