= Sarah's Oil =

2025 film by Cyrus Nowrasteh

- Theatrical release poster
- Directed by: Cyrus Nowrasteh
- Written by: Betsy Giffen Nowrasteh; Cyrus Nowrasteh
- Produced by: John Shepherd; Cyrus Nowrasteh; Kevin Downes; Daryl Lefever; Erwin brothers; Zachary Levi; Derrick Williams
- Starring: Zachary Levi; Naya Desir-Johnson; Sonequa Martin-Green; Garret Dillahunt
- Cinematography: Johnny Derango
- Edited by: Paul Seydor; Sean Albertson
- Music by: Kathryn Bostic
- Production companies: Wonder Project; Kingdom Story Company
- Distributed by: Amazon MGM Studios
- Release date: November 7, 2025
- Running time: 104 minutes
- Country: United States
- Language: English
- Budget: $18 million
- Box office: $12 million

Sarah's Oil is a 2025 American biographical drama film about Sarah Rector, directed, co-produced, and co-written by Cyrus Nowrasteh. It is inspired by the 2014 book Searching for Sarah Rector: The Richest Black Girl in America by Tonya Bolden. It stars Zachary Levi, Naya Desir-Johnson, Sonequa Martin-Green, and Garret Dillahunt.

Released theatrically by Amazon MGM Studios on November 7, 2025, Sarah's Oil received generally positive reviews from critics and grossed $12 million at the box office on a $18 million production budget.

== Plot ==
In 1913 Sarah Rector, as a descendant of the Muscogee Nation, is granted nearly 160 acres of uncultivated land in Glenpool, Oklahoma under the terms of the Reconstruction Treaties. With the encouragement of her mother Rose, Sarah believes that the land beneath their home is rich in oil. Sarah convinces her reluctant father Joe to make a deal with local oil executive Jim Devnan to conduct a preliminary exploration of the land. Though Devnan's company discovers that the Rectors' land is rich in oil, he withhold this information from the family, seeking to steal the oil from the African American family.

Devnan sends his two henchmen Earl and Jimsye to steal Sarah's deed to the land but they fail to recover the document. However, they shoot and wound Sarah's dog, causing it to flee. Unable to trust Devnan, Sarah hires the services of the wildcatter Bert Smith and his Mexican business partner Mace. Using the equipment left behind by Devnan's oil company, Sarah and her business partners Smith and Mace begin exploring the land beneath for oil.

Seeking to extract the oil beneath the Rectors' land, Devnan unsuccessfully attempts to buy off the land from Sarah but is rebuffed by Smith, who sees through his ruse. Devnan then pursues legal action against the Rectors, alleging a breach of contract. This lawfare coincides with the killings of two Osage children during a land dispute. Sarah is pressured to choose Smith as her white guardian, which was required in Oklahoma for young black oil owners, but he put her claim at risk. In response, the Rectors solicit the services of a White civil rights attorney named Kate Barnard and a Black journalist named Mr Pharr, who help publicize their case to the national media.

Devnan sends Earl and Jimsye to assassinate Sarah and her brother Junior but the two children flee into the bush. Mace is killed trying to protect the family. Local police and Osage tribal police apprehend the assassins and Barnard and Smith convince the judge to annul the guardianship. Before the Rectors and Smith can extract the oil, Devnan and his employees attempt to seize the land and oil rig by force. Smith thwarts his plan by revealing that he has rewired the explosives around Devnan's oil rig, ensuring mutual assured destruction in the event of hostilities. Sarah intentionally sets off the dynamite in her well in an attempt to unblock it, which works; while her father uses the distraction to shoot the gun out of Devnan's hand.

Devnan is subsequently arrested for his crimes while Barnard helps the Rectors' to secure their land ownership through the court system. Sarah and Smith part as friends, though Smith runs away to escape issues with the widows he has conned. The film mentions that Sarah became an oil millionaire.

== Cast ==
- Zachary Levi as Bert Smith
- Naya Desir-Johnson as Sarah Rector
  - Tamala Jones voices the older Sarah
- Sonequa Martin-Green as Rose Rector, Sarah's mother
- Garret Dillahunt as Devnan
- Mel Rodriguez as Mace
- Kenric Green as Joe Rector, Sarah's father
- Bridget Regan as Kate Barnard
- Ryan O'Quinn as Eddie Caron
- Adyan Copes as Junior Rector, Sarah's younger brother
- Stelio Savante as Earl
- Marco Fuller as Jimsye
- Jonathan Lipnicki as a chemist
- Selase Botchway as Mr. Pharr

== Production ==
In July 2024, principal photography was underway in Oklahoma for Sarah's Oil, which was directed, co-produced, and co-written by Cyrus Nowrasteh with Betsy Giffen Nowrasteh. In August, filming had wrapped, when Zachary Levi, Naya Desir-Johnson, Sonequa Martin-Green, Garret Dillahunt, Bridget Regan, Kenric Green, Adyan Copes, Stelio Savante, and Mel Rodriguez were revealed to have joined the cast.

The film was shot primarily in Okmulgee, Oklahoma.

== Release ==
Sarah's Oil was released in the United States on November 7, 2025 by Amazon MGM Studios, having been moved ahead from its original December 25, 2025 date.

== Reception ==
=== Box office ===
It debuted at #4 at the box office for its opening weekend, grossing $4.5 million.

=== Critical response ===
On the review aggregator website Rotten Tomatoes, 86% of 14 critics' reviews are positive, with an average rating of 6.4/10. Audiences polled by CinemaScore gave the film a rare average grade of "A+" on an A+ to F scale.

Joe Leydon of Variety gave Sarah's Oil a positive review, praising the performances of Naya Desir-Johnson and Zachary Levi as Sarah and Bert. Leydon compared the film's story to Martin Scorsese's Killers of the Flower Moon, "describing it as a more family-friendly movie that nonetheless offers a similarly cautionary history lesson." While observing that the film toned down graphic violence, Leydon praised the film for capturing the racism and discrimination faced by Black American people living in the United States at the time. Praising the production values and storytelling, Leydon said that the film had the potential to reach beyond its target faith-based audience.

Val Moore of "Blackfilm.com" praise the film for highlighting the story of Sarah Rector and the history of Black entrepreneurship.

=== Accolades ===
Award	Date of ceremony	Category	Recipient(s)	Result	Ref.
Black Reel Awards	February 16, 2026	Outstanding Breakthrough Performance	Naya Desir-Johnson	Nominated	
Celebration of Cinema and Television	December 9, 2025	Rising Star – Film	Naya Desir-Johnson	Won	
Movieguide Awards	February 6, 2026	Faith and Freedom Award for Movies	Sarah's Oil	Nominated	
Movieguide Awards	February 6, 2026	Best Movie for Mature Audiences	Sarah's Oil	Won	
Movieguide Awards	February 6, 2026	Grace Award for Most Inspiring Performance for Movies, Actor	Zachary Levi	Nominated	
Movieguide Awards	February 6, 2026	Grace Award for Most Inspiring Performance for Movies, Actress	Naya Desir-Johnson	Won	
NAACP Image Awards	February 28, 2026	Outstanding Motion Picture	Sarah's Oil	Nominated	
NAACP Image Awards	February 28, 2026	Outstanding Youth Performance in a Motion Picture	Naya Desir-Johnson	Won	
