= Kingdom Business =

American musical drama television series

- Genre: Drama; Musical; Crime drama; Romance; Thriller
- Created by: John J. Sakmar; Kerry Lenhart
- Starring: Yolanda Adams; Serayah; Chaundre A. Hall-Broomfield; Michael Jai White; Michael Beach; Kiandra Richardson
- Country of origin: United States
- Original language: English
- No. of seasons: 2
- No. of episodes: 16

Production
- Executive producers: John J. Sakmar; Kerry Lenhart; Holly Carter; DeVon Franklin; Kirk Franklin; Michael Van Dyck
- Camera setup: Multiple camera
- Running time: 41–51 min.
- Production companies: Franklin Entertainment; Relevé Entertainment; Fo Yo Soul Entertainment; Inspired Entertainment; DAELight Media

Original release
- Network: BET+
- Release: May 19, 2022 – December 14, 2023

Kingdom Business is an American musical drama series created by John J. Sakmar & Kerry Lenhart and executive produced by Kirk Franklin and DeVon Franklin. It stars Yolanda Adams as Denita Jordan, a gospel superstar who runs the in-house record label Kingdom Records, and Serayah as Rebecca "Rbel" Belle, a young exotic dancer who singing talent at the memorial service for her best friend goes viral. It premiered on BET+ on May 19, 2022. In February 2023, the series was renewed for a second season, which premiered on November 2, 2023.

== Plot ==
The show follows Denita (Yolanda Adams), a gospel superstar who runs the in-house record label Kingdom Records and doubles as First Lady of First Kingdom Church. She also happens to be determined to guard her family and its many secrets at all costs. Just as Denita is enjoying the fruits of her labor, the world she’s worked so hard to put together begins to unravel when an unexpected contender in the gospel music scene threatens her status. Rbel (Serayah) is a young woman on the rise whose checkered past as an exotic dancer is no match for her destiny to turn the gospel world on its head with her newfound voice.

== Cast and characters ==
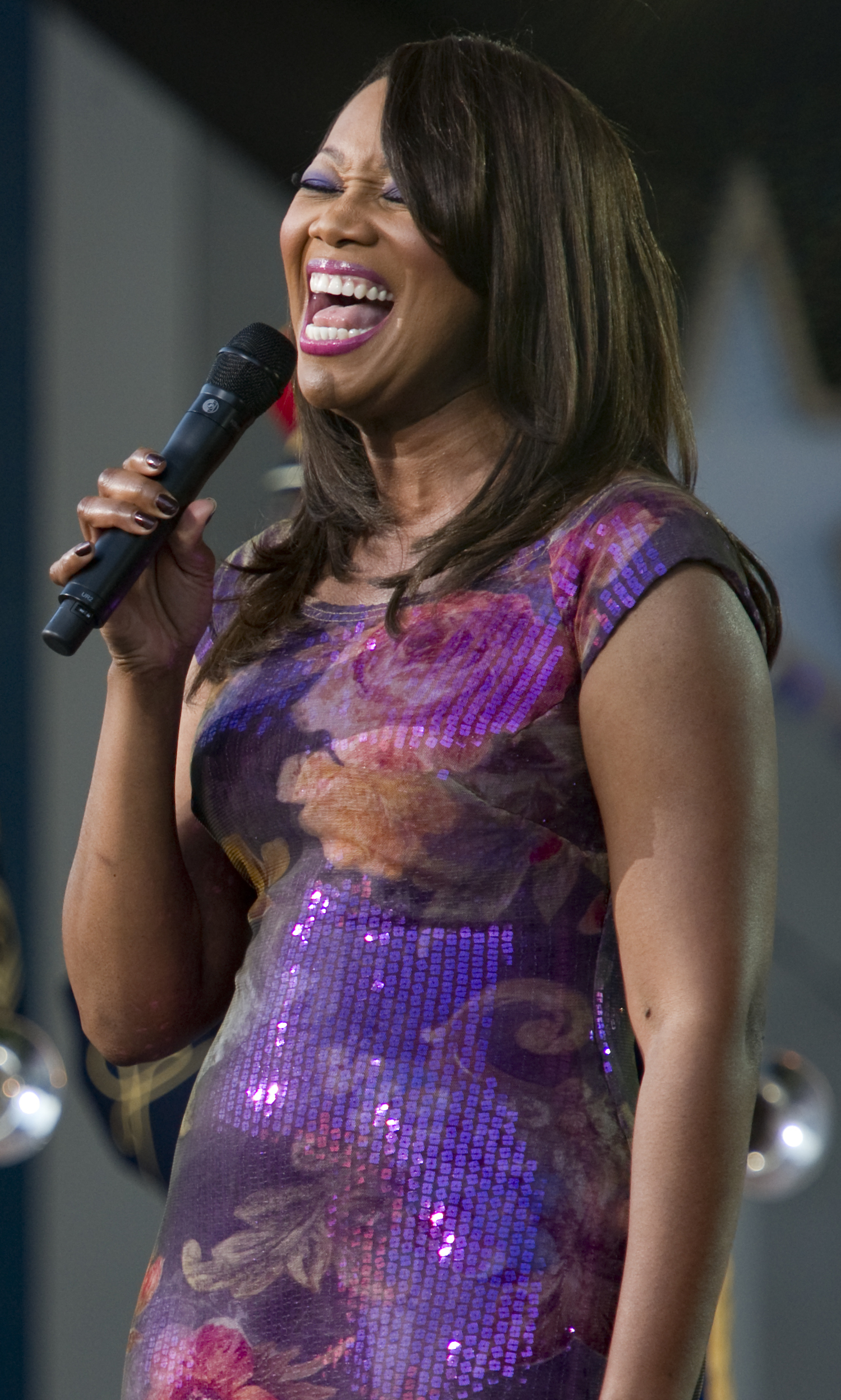
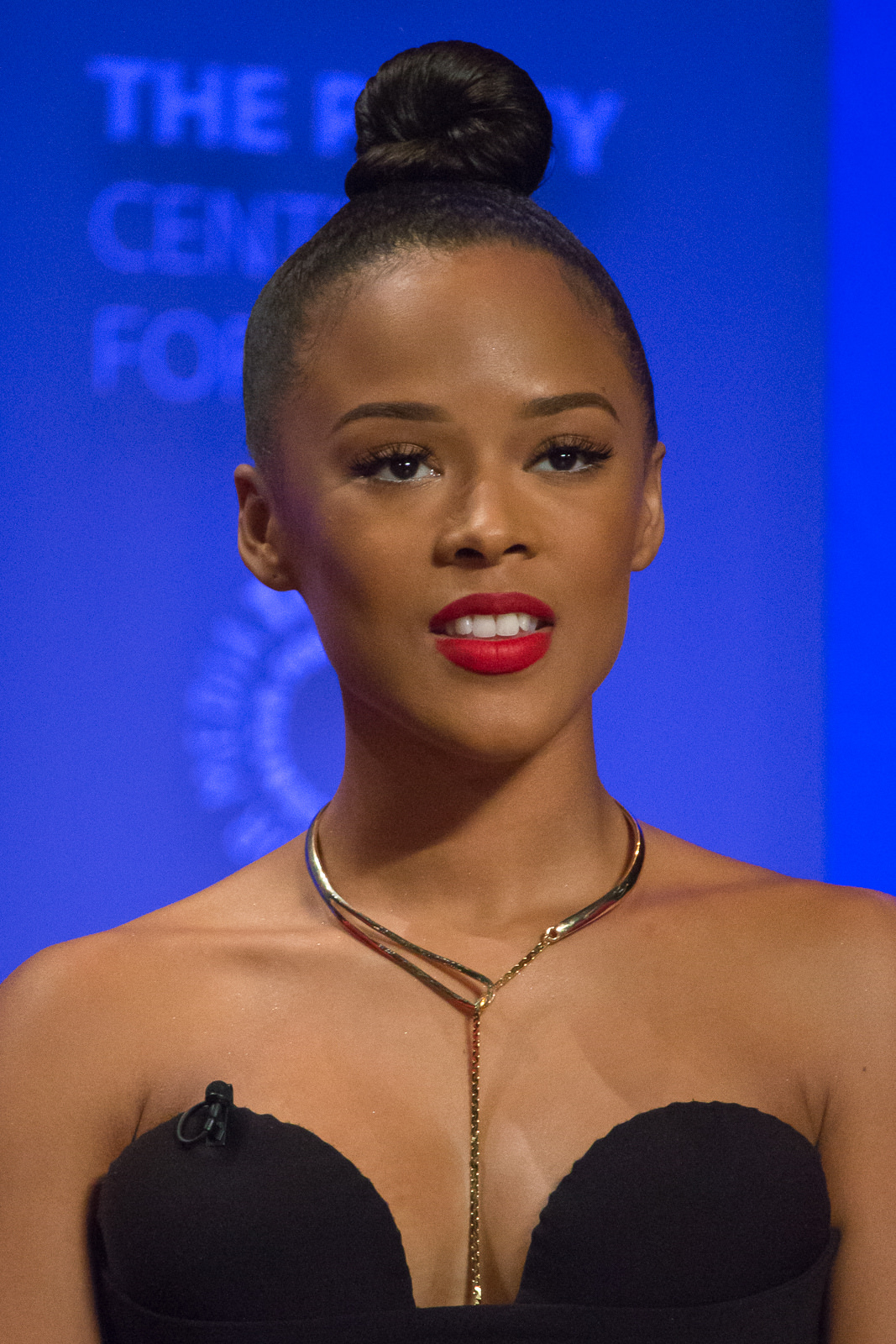
Yolanda Adams and Serayah star in the series.

=== Main ===
- Yolanda Adams as Denita Jordan
- Serayah as Rebecca "Rbel" Belle
- Michael Jai White as Julius "Caesar" Jones
- Michael Beach as Calvin Jordan
- Chaundre A. Hall-Broomfield as Taj Jordan
- Kiandra Richardson as Cierra Joy “C.J.” Jordan-Walker (season 2; recurring, season 1)

=== Recurring ===
- Loretta Devine as Darlene West, Denita’s mother
- Dominique Johnson as Malcolm Walker
- Tamar Braxton as Sasha
- La'Myia Good as Essence
- Aspen Kennedy as Zyan
- Kajuana S. Marie as Dani
- Sam Malone as Dex
- Louis Gossett Jr. as Bishop Jeremiah West, Denita’s father
- Patrice Fisher as Detective Juanita Parker
- Kirk Franklin as Deacon D'Wayne
- Journey Carter as Jewel
- Sam Malone as Dex
- Gerard Catus as Ray Johnson
- Moritz J. Williams as Xavier James
- Maura Gale as Joyce Williams
- Gillian White as Vy Waters
- Uyoata Udi as Elijah
- Michelle Williams as Skye Johnson
- DeVon Franklin as Renard Gray

=== Guest stars ===
- Erica Campbell
- Tasha Cobbs Leonard
- Israel Houghton
- Tamela Mann
- David Mann
- Naomi Raine

== Episodes ==
Season	Episodes	Originally released	
Season	Episodes	First released	Last released
1	8	May 19, 2022	
2	8	November 2, 2023	December 14, 2023

=== Season 1 (2022) ===
No. overall	No. in season	Title	Directed by	Written by	Original release date	BET air date	U.S. linear viewers (millions)
1	1	"One Moment from Glory"	Oz Scott	John J. Sakmar & Kerry Lenhart	May 19, 2022	June 1, 2022	0.63
2	2	"His Eye Is on the...Raven?"	Oz Scott	John J. Sakmar & Kerry Lenhart	May 19, 2022	August 7, 2022	0.38
3	3	"Let It Burn"	Mary Lou Belli	Ruth Ferrera	May 19, 2022	January 18, 2023	0.55
4	4	"If I Could"	Mary Lou Belli	Jasmine Swift	May 19, 2022	January 25, 2023	0.64
5	5	"Imagine"	Shea William Vanderpoort	Shani Am. Moore	May 19, 2022	February 1, 2023	0.53
6	6	"Love Song"	Shea William Vanderpoort	Corey Moore	May 19, 2022	February 8, 2023	0.55
7	7	"Dear God"	Christopher Erskin	Ruth Ferrera	May 19, 2022	February 15, 2023	0.54
8	8	"Homecoming"	Christopher Erskin	John J. Sakmar & Kerry Lenhart	May 19, 2022	February 22, 2023	0.37

=== Season 2 (2023) ===
No. overall	No. in season	Title	Directed by	Written by	Original release date	BET air date	U.S. linear viewers (millions)
9	1	"Stay"	Mary Lou Belli	John J. Sakmar & Kerry Lenhart	November 2, 2023	November 26, 2023	N/A
10	2	"Wanna Be Happy"	Mary Lou Belli	Ruth Ferrera	November 2, 2023	March 26, 2024	N/A
11	3	"Why We Sing"	Neema Barnette	Corey Moore	November 9, 2023	April 2, 2024	N/A
12	4	"Caught Up"	Neema Barnette	Jasmine Swift	November 16, 2023	April 9, 2024	N/A
13	5	"Broken People"	Terri J. Vaughn	Ruth Ferrera & Sara Ray	November 23, 2023	April 16, 2024	N/A
14	6	"Fear Is Not My Future"	Terri J. Vaughn	Corey Moore	November 30, 2023	April 23, 2024	N/A
15	7	"Bed of Lies"	Oz Scott	Jasmine Swift	December 7, 2023	April 30, 2024	N/A
16	8	"Song of Joy"	Oz Scott	John J. Sakmar & Kerry Lenhart	December 14, 2023	May 7, 2024	N/A

== Production ==
=== Development ===
On December 2, 2019, the series was in development by NBC. On August 23, 2021, the series was moved to BET+ where it received a series order. The series premiered on May 19, 2022. On February 2, 2023, BET+ renewed the series for a second season.

=== Casting ===
The main cast was revealed on December 7, 2021.
