= Serayah =

American singer (born 1995)

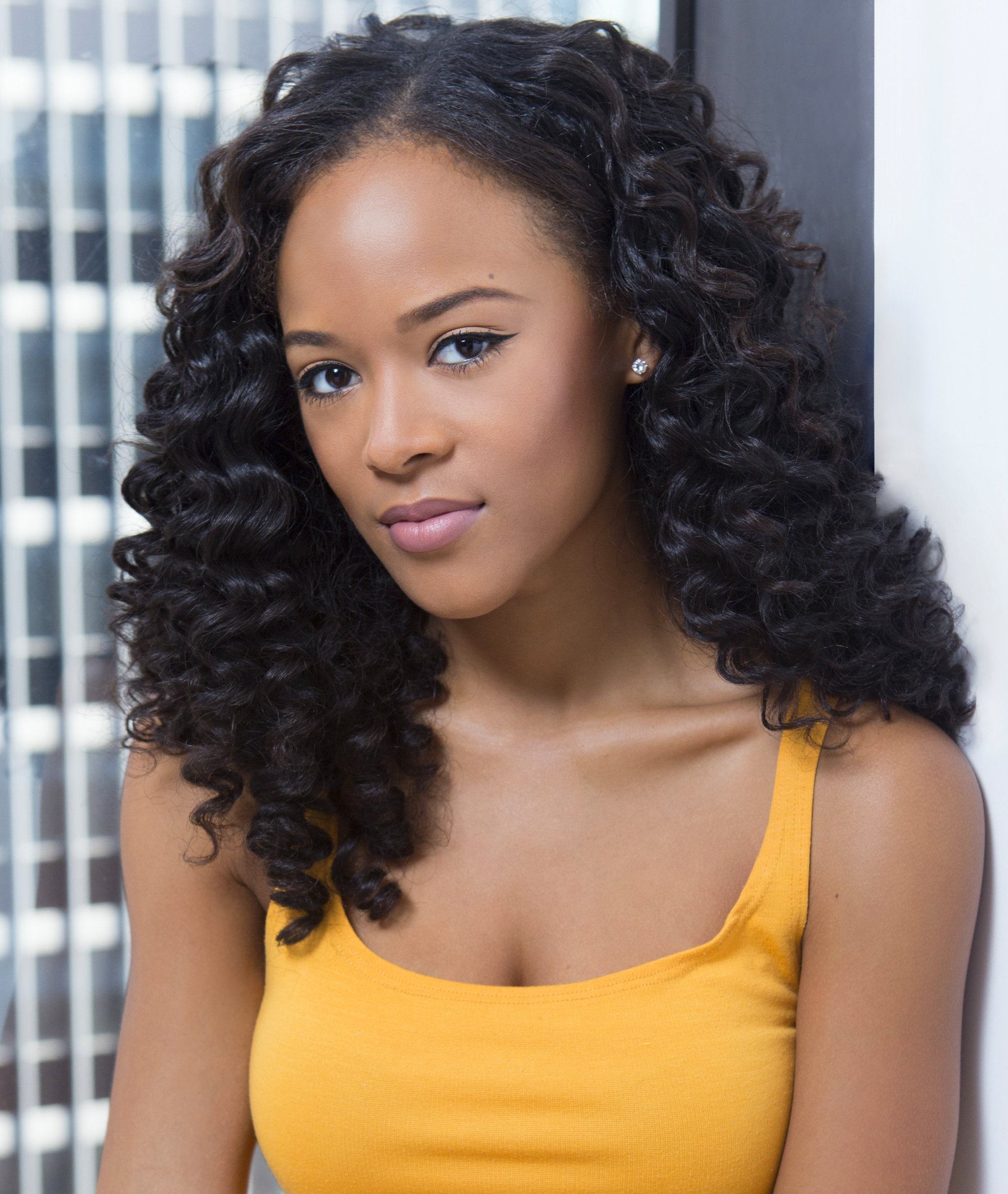
- Serayah at the Fashion Los Angeles Awards 2018.
- Born: Serayah Ranee McNeill; June 20, 1995 (age 31); Encinitas, California, U.S.
- Education: Taft High School
- Occupations: Actress, singer, model
- Years active: 2015–present
- Children: 1

Serayah Ranee McNeill (born June 20, 1995), known mononymously as Serayah, is an American actress, model, and singer. She is known for her roles as Tiana Brown on the Fox musical drama series Empire (2015–2020), and as Rebecca "Rbel" Belle in the BET+ musical drama series, Kingdom Business (2022–2023).

== Early life ==
Serayah Ranee McNeill was born in Encinitas, California. She graduated from Taft High School in Woodland Hills, California, where she played for the girls' varsity basketball team, in 2013.

== Career ==
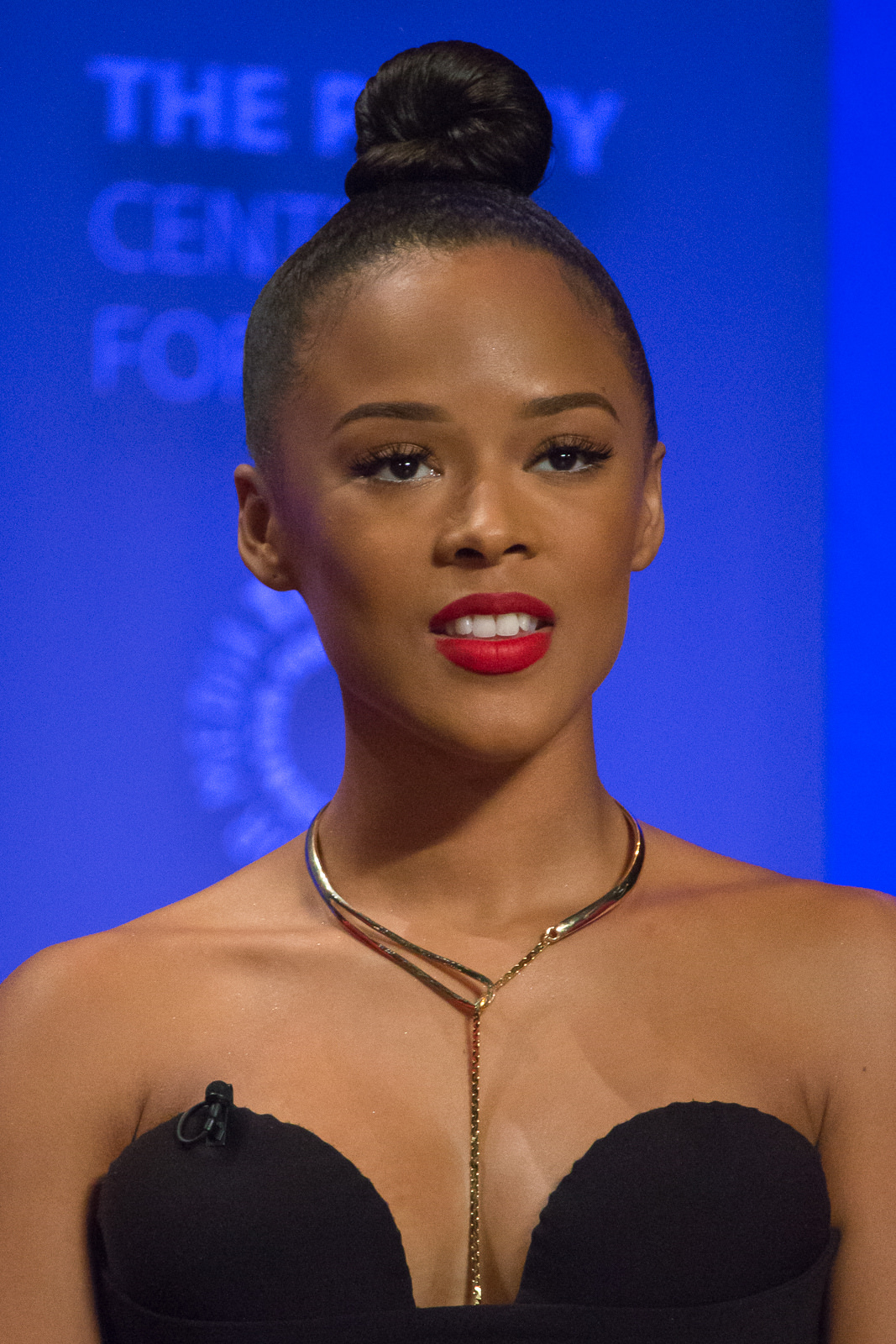
Serayah in 2016

=== Acting ===
The character of Tiana on Empire marks her first major acting role. In a 2015 interview with Black Enterprise, Serayah stated of her role, "One thing I always say about this show is it's a lot of drama, but it's family drama so people relate. Every family has some type of drama, and I think that it touches on a lot of the entertainment business and the music business. Some exaggerated parts, but it really does touch on some of the things that happen." She was added to the series regular cast on August 26, 2015. She appeared in the 2017 drama film Burning Sands and later starred in films Favorite Son (2021) and its sequel Favorite Son Christmas (2023) directed by Robin Givens.

In 2021, Serayah played the lead in the Lifetime movie Envy: A Seven Deadly Sins Story. Later in 2021, Serayah joined the cast of Starz crime drama series, Black Mafia Family in a recurring role. She starred in VH1 movie Hip Hop Family Christmas (2021) and its sequel Hip Hop Family Christmas Wedding (2022) alongside Keri Hilson, Ne-Yo and Valarie Pettiford, and played the lead opposite Ne-Yo in the BET+ film The Sound of Christmas.

In 2022, Serayah was cast in a leading role alongside gospel singer Yolanda Adams in the BET+ musical drama series, Kingdom Business. The series premiered on May 19, 2022 and the second season premiered on November 2, 2023. In 2023 she starred in the Tubi thriller film Best Friend.

Serayeh features alongside Phylicia Rashad, Tyler Lepley, Walnette Santiago, Nijah Brenea and Taylor Thomas, Jermaine Dupri, Lecrae Moore and Big Tigger in Tyler Perry's 2025 film Ruth and Boaz. Written by Michael Elliot (Brown Sugar) and Cory Tynan (Play’d), directed by Alanna Brown Trees of Peace, Tyler Perry and co-producer DeVon Franklin offer a modern version of the biblical love story of Ruth and Boaz. The story follows an aspiring singer Ruth as she flees the Atlanta music scene with elderly newly-widowed Naomi (Phylicia Rashad, and together try to build a new life. The production is part of Tyler Perry's partnership with Netflix, creating faith-based films.

The film features songs from Serayah with a duet of Goodness of God (Bethel Music) and cameo role from 13 Grammy Award winner Babyface which was recorded live.

=== Music ===
In 2015, Serayah appeared in singer Taylor Swift's video for the song "Bad Blood" as the character Dilemma. On July 18, 2015, Swift performed a rendition of her song "Style" alongside McNeill on the Chicago stop of her The 1989 World Tour. She performed at Marshall Academy of the Arts in Long Beach in March 2015. In 2016, she was featured in the RedOne song "Don't You Need Somebody", that also features Enrique Iglesias, R. City and Shaggy. In 2018, she released her debut EP Addicted. In 2019, she played a main role in the music video for "Undecided" by Chris Brown. In 2022, she appeared in the music video by Diddy feat. Bryson Tiller for the song, Gotta Move On. In 2024, Serayah released the extended version of her EP Archives, which featured songwriting contributions from RushDee.

== Personal life ==
In 2023, Serayah began dating rapper and actor Joey Badass. On February 6, 2025, the couple announced they were expecting their first child. Their son was born on June 19, 2025.

== Filmography ==
=== Film ===
Year	Film	Role	Notes
2016	Lucky Girl	Lisa Jackson	
2017	Burning Sands	Angel	
2021	Favorite Son	Dawn	
2022	The Sound of Christmas	Montana	
2023	Best Friend	Trisha	
2023	Favorite Son 2: Christmas	Dawn	
2024	Robbin	Robin	
2025	Ruth & Boaz	Ruth Moably	
2026	Takeover †	Lt. Keisha Jenner	Post-production

=== Television ===
Year	Title	Role	Notes
2015–2020	Empire	Tiana Brown	Recurring (season 1); Main (seasons 2–6)
2019	Lip Sync Battle	Herself	Episode: “Serayah vs Rotimi”
2021	Envy: A Seven Deadly Sins Story	Keisha	Television film
2021–present	Black Mafia Family	Lori Walker	Recurring
2021	Hip Hop Family Christmas	Kelsey Nixon	Television film
2022	Hip Hop Family Christmas Wedding	Kelsey Nixon	Television film
2021	True Story	Andrea	2 episodes
2022–2023	Kingdom Business	Rebecca "Rbel" Belle	Lead role
2023	Wu-Tang: An American Saga	Karina	Recurring

== Discography ==
EPs

- Addicted (2018)
- Ray (2020)
- Flutter (2023)
- Archives (Extended Version) (2023)

Title	Year	Album
"Driving Me"	2017	Addicted
"You Told Me"	2018	Addicted
"GTTM (Going Through The Motions)"	2018	Addicted
"So Good"	2018	Non-album single
"Lost & Found"	2018	Addicted
"4 Pages"	2019	Non-album single
"Love It"	2019	Non-album single
"Feel Something"	2023	Flutter
"Love Or Die" (featuring Village Boy Prince)	2023	Flutter
"Last Night"	2023	Flutter
"Real" (featuring Lady London)	2023	Flutter
"Danger"	2023	Flutter
"F.B.B."	2023	Flutter
"Should I Stay"	2023	Flutter

=== Featured ===
List of singles, with selected chart positions
Title	Year	Peak chart positions										Album
Title	Year	US	US R&B/HH	US Pop	US Rhythm	BEL (Wa)	GER	POL	SPA	SWE	SWI	Album
"Drip Drop" (Empire Cast featuring Yazz and Serayah)	2015	— (Note: "Drip Drop" did not enter the Billboard Hot 100, but peaked at number 14 on the Bubbling Under Hot 100 Singles chart.)	37	—	—	—	73	—	—	—	—	Empire: Original Soundtrack from Season 1
"Look But Don't Touch" (Empire Cast featuring Serayah)	2016	—	—	—	33	—	—	—	—	—	—	Empire: Original Soundtrack Season 2 Volume 2
"Don't You Need Somebody" (RedOne featuring Enrique Iglesias, R. City, Serayah and Shaggy)	2016	—	—	32	37	69	—	59	27	7	19	Non-album single
