= Light of the World (film) =

- Theatrical release poster
- Directed by: Tom Bancroft; John J. Schafer
- Screenplay by: David Armstrong; Drew Armstrong
- Story by: David M. Armstrong; Jason Heaton
- Produced by: Brennan McPherson
- Starring: Ian Hanlin; Benjamin Jacobson
- Edited by: Rob Zeigler
- Music by: Alex McKenzie
- Production company: Salvation Poem Project
- Distributed by: Salvation Poem Project
- Release dates: June 6, 2025 (THSC State Convention); September 5, 2025 (United States)
- Running time: 91 minutes
- Country: United States
- Language: English
- Budget: $20 million
- Box office: $5.7 million

Light of the World is a 2025 American animated Christian drama film directed by Tom Bancroft and John J. Schafer, in their feature directorial debuts. The film is about Jesus's life told through John the Apostle's eyes.

The film premiered at the THSC State Convention on June 6, 2025, and was released in the United States on September 5.

== Plot ==
A young John and his older brother James hear a story from their mother about God's plan to bring a Messiah into the world to free his people from darkness, but their father Zebedee does not believe. Matthew, the tax collector, arrives to collect taxes for the Romans. Because John is too young to fish, he is sent to the marketplace to sell fish and bring the money back to Matthew. While at the market, John meets a little-known carpenter.

When John returns with only a single coin, Matthew demands the family pay double in three days. The next day, John meets the Baptizer, who tells him that Jesus is the Messiah. Later that night, Andrew and John attend a wedding where Jesus turns water into wine. Seeing John's intrigued expression, Jesus's mother Mary confirms she knew Jesus is the Messiah and tells John about the Nativity. The next morning, John and Andrew bring Jesus to help Zebedee catch a miraculous amount of fish, thus enabling them to pay their taxes.

John, James, Peter and Andrew decide to follow Jesus, along with other disciples, including Simon the Zealot and Judas Iscariot. As news of his ministry spreads, Jesus heals Mary Magdalene, a possessed woman, who then follows him. Jesus next heals a paralytic man and a servant for a Roman centurion. His disciples question why he helped a Roman centurion, to which Jesus tells them to love their enemies through the parable of the Good Samaritan. John decides to be kind to Matthew, who joins Jesus as a disciple.

Jesus performs other miracles, such as the feeding of the 5,000. The Pharisees, excluding Nicodemus and Joseph of Arimathea, plot with the high priest Caiaphas to get rid of Jesus. John the Baptist is arrested and later executed. Jesus, deeply affected by his death, remembers when John baptized him in the Jordan River.

When the temple soldiers come to arrest Jesus, he stays behind as the disciples flee by boat. Later that night, Jesus walks out on the water and invites Peter to walk with him. However, Peter gets scared and begins to sink, but Jesus saves him. All twelve disciples recognize Jesus as the Son of God.

They all triumphally enter Jerusalem, but Jesus is overcome with burden. At the Last Supper, Jesus tells his disciples that one of them will betray him, before telling Judas to do what he intends. Jesus also prophesies Peter will deny him three times. Jesus and the disciple arrive in the Garden of Gethsemane, where Jesus prays in agony, but accepts to carry out his mission to the end.

Judas arrives in the garden, leading the Temple guards, and Jesus is arrested. John and Peter follow him in the courtyard of Caiaphas's palace. While John observes the trial, Peter denies Jesus three times, before the rooster crows. Caiaphas questions Jesus about his identity, in which Jesus answers that he is the Messiah. Enraged, Caiaphas and the Sanhedrin brutally beat Jesus.

Jesus is brought before Pontius Pilate, who orders that he be flogged and crowned with thorns, before being presented to the people. John intervenes, claiming Jesus is the Messiah, but Jesus is condemned to be crucified. John witnesses Jesus carry his cross to Golgotha, where Jesus dies. Joseph of Arimathea and Nicodemus bury Jesus.

John and James return home, distraught. Three days later, Mary Magdalene discovers Jesus's tomb empty. The resurrected Jesus appears as the disciples experience another miraculous catch of fish. Recognizing Jesus, John and the disciples embrace Jesus. Peter, remorseful, asks Jesus for forgiveness for having denied him. Jesus says goodbye to his disciples, promising that he will always be with them, and ascends into heaven. Zebedee, inspired by his son's faith, decides to follow Jesus, and he and John pray together.

== Cast ==
- Ian Hanlin as Jesus
- Benjamin Jacobson as John
- Dylan Leonard as James
- Sam Darkoh as Peter
  - Elias Leacock as young Peter
- Vincent Tong as Andrew
- Adam Kozlick as Matthew
- Bill Newton as Simon
- David A. Kaye as Judas Iscariot
- Ceara Morgana as Mary Magdalene (Mags)
- Rebekah Schafer as Mother Mary
- Jesse Inocalla as The Baptizer
- David Pettitt as Zebedee
- Erin Mathews as Salome
- Adam Nurada as Caiaphas
- Michael Benyaer as Nicodemus
- Mark Oliver as Pontius Pilate
- Colin Murdock as Lucius, the Roman centurion
- Peter New as Pharisee
- Richard Newman as Fish Monger

== Production ==
Epipheo, a Cincinnati studio which launched its film division in 2022, was tapped to help develop the film's "children's storybook come to life" aesthetic. Production designer Luke Lehenbauer points out that the creators wanted a "hand of the artist feel", in part achieved through the application of real painting textures to the digitally painted backgrounds. The animation was provided by Irish animation studio, Lighthouse Studios. The production budget for the film was $20 million.

== Release ==
Light of the World had its world premiere at the THSC State Convention on June 6, 2025. It then premiered at the Bible Museum at Washington, D.C., on August 22, and was released in the United States and Canada on September 5. The film was released a day early in Australia, New Zealand, Fiji, Papua New Guinea, and Samoa. International releases later followed, like Puerto Rico on September 11, Bolivia on September 18, December 10 in the Philippines, November 14 in Nigeria and Ghana,, December 11 in Brazil, and March 12, 2026 in Germany, Austria, and Switzerland.

== Reception ==
=== Critical response ===
On the review aggregator website Rotten Tomatoes, 80% of 15 critics' reviews are positive. Audiences polled by CinemaScore gave the film an average grade of "A" on an A+ to F scale.
