= Running the Bases =

2022 film by Marty Roberts and Jimmy Womble

- Theatrical release poster
- Directed by: Marty Roberts; Jimmy Womble
- Written by: Marty Roberts; Jimmy Womble
- Produced by: Robert C. Bigelow
- Starring: Brett Varvel; Gigi Orsillo; Todd Terry; Cameron Arnett
- Cinematography: Steven Parker
- Edited by: Michael Palmerio; John Quinn; Jimmy Womble
- Production company: UP2U Films
- Distributed by: UP2U Films
- Release date: September 16, 2022
- Running time: 127 minutes
- Country: United States
- Language: English
- Budget: $3.3 million
- Box office: $1.5 million

Running the Bases is a 2022 American Christian sports film written and directed by Marty Roberts and Jimmy Womble. It stars Brett Varvel, Gigi Orsillo, Todd Terry, and Cameron Arnett, and follows a small-town baseball coach who becomes the head coach of a large high school program, but soon faces opposition to his coaching methods. It was released on September 16, 2022.

== Premise ==
"When a small-town baseball coach gets the offer of a lifetime from a larger 6A High School, he uproots his family and leaves the only home he's ever known. But as a man of faith, he soon faces extreme opposition to his coaching methods from the school superintendent."

== Cast ==
- Brett Varvel as Luke Brooks
  - Raphael Ruggero as Teen Luke
- Gigi Orsillo as Jessica Brooks
- Todd Terry as Michael Jamison
- Cameron Arnett as Sam Parker
- Garry Nation as Ted Graham
- Stephen Lewis as Coach Cage Tyson

== Production ==
Filming took place on a $3.3 million budget in Harrison, Arkansas in May and June 2021.

== Release ==
Running the Bases was released in the United States on September 16, 2022. The film made $538,749 from 1,080 theaters in its opening weekend. 86% of the audience was Caucasian, with 51% being female and 79% over the age of 35; PostTrak reported filmgoers gave the film an 86% positive score.
