= A Thousand Tomorrows =

2005 novel by Karen Kingsbury

- First edition
- Author: Karen Kingsbury
- Language: English
- Series: Cody Gunner series
- Genre: Christian fiction
- Published: April 2005 (Center Street)
- Publication place: United States
- Media type: Print (hardback & paperback)
- Pages: 244 pp
- ISBN: 1-931722-80-3
- OCLC: 65177986
- Followed by: Just Beyond the Clouds

A Thousand Tomorrows is the first book in the Cody Gunner series by Karen Kingsbury.

It was adapted into a television series for Great American Pure Flix.

== Summary ==
Cody Gunner is a rbull rider. On track to the top, Cody has rejected everything about his past, including his father, his mother, and every woman. His heart only has room for his young brother. Ali Daniels is the most recognized horsewoman in her sport. She embraces life, making the most of every moment and risking everything for her passion. Along the way, Ali seeks to fulfill the dreams of her dead sister. Competing is all she needs until the day Cody discovers what Ali has been hiding so well. Ali allows Cody into her world. Despite their fears, they bare their souls. Love finds them in a way that it finds anyone. In a breathless race for time, their love becomes part of them that will never fail.

== Reception ==
Publishers Weekly wrote that "Despite the plot's limitations, Kingsbury fans will undoubtedly be pleased by more of the inspirational fiction for which this author has become beloved." A review in The Daily Oklahoman wrote that the story had an "unusual plot" and Kinsgbury "paints a sweet picture of unending love."
