= Ruth & Boaz =

- Directed by: Alanna Brown
- Written by: Michael Elliot; Cory Tynan
- Based on: Book of Ruth
- Produced by: Tyler Perry; DeVon Franklin
- Starring: Serayah; Tyler Lepley; Phylicia Rashad
- Edited by: Maysie Hoy
- Production companies: DeVon Franklin Entertainment; Tyler Perry Studios
- Distributed by: Netflix
- Release date: September 26, 2025
- Running time: 93 minutes
- Country: United States
- Language: English

Ruth & Boaz is a 2025 American faith-based romance film produced by Tyler Perry and DeVon Franklin, and directed by Alanna Brown. It stars Serayah, Tyler Lepley, and Phylicia Rashad.

It is a modern-day retelling of the Biblical Book of Ruth, centered on Ruth Moably, a former Atlanta hip-hop artist who flees her troubled past to a small town in Tennessee. While caring for her late boyfriend's grieving mother, Miss Naomi, Ruth finds unexpected redemption and a new love with vineyard owner Boaz.

The film was released by Netflix on September 26, 2025.

== Plot ==
Atlantan hip-hop artist Ruth Moably, of a duo 404 with lifelong friend Breana, uncomfortable with their controlling manager Sy, announces she wants out. Claiming she owes him thousands, he insists she first 'repay' him. Naomi, Ruth’s boyfriend Marlon’s mother, calls her to the hospital after midnight. Both he and his dad Eli were gunned down in an attempted 'carjacking'.

At the wake, Naomi discovers Eli had lost everything in Atlanta. Only a small house in Tennessee is left. Ruth then learns Sy orchestrated the shooting to coerce her compliance. He warns Naomi could be next.

Desperate, Ruth joins Naomi in Tennessee. Determined, the young woman immediately tackles the abandoned house's greatest problem, the broken windows. A dejected Naomi storms off to bed. In the morning, Ruth tirelessly seeks work in town, finally joining a grape harvesting crew for a vineyard recently inherited by Boaz.

Meanwhile, Naomi ernestly cleans the house. Pastor Charles appears, but she hides. Ruth returns, telling her about her job. Naomi fondly remembers both the older Azra and his son Bo.

Fellow grape picker Lena invites Ruth out for drinks and karaoke. Lena signs her up, having heard her singing earlier. As Ruth sings, she catches Boaz's eye. Boaz unsuccessfully tries to flirt with her.

In Atlanta, a label wants to sign 404 with Ruth, not her replacement. Sy pressures Breana, who insists she knows nothing. He searches her phone, then tasks Wolf with finding Ruth. Bree warns her that Sy is still furious. Ruth reveals she is hiding in Tennessee.

Ruth unsuccessfully attempts to get Naomi to church, who is ashamed of her and Eli's fall from grace. Making partner at an Atlanta firm, they had become extremely wealthy. Naomi fears being rejected. Ruth relays the older woman's fears to Pastor Charles and Boaz. The pastor mentions the house needs paint, she quips it needs more like a miracle.

At the vineyard, Lena reveals a video she posted of Ruth has 80,000+ hits. Panicked, Ruth insists she take it down. No one knows of the danger of Sy finding her.

Soon after, Pastor Charles, Boaz and many locals come to fix up Naomi's. They sweep, scrape and paint, replace the many broken windows and Boaz retiles the roof. After Ruth brings them iced tea, Naomi convinces her and Boaz to go for a walk.

As they wander, Boaz talks about himself. First, leaving town young, doing two tours in Afghanistan, then in NYC getting an MBA and working on Wall Street before returning. Ruth grew up in Atlanta, and was abandoned by her mother at five. The high school drop out has never traveled. Ruth feels her voice is her only valuable.

After gifting Ruth and Naomi a car, Boaz takes Ruth for another surprise. He introduces her to the famous musician Baby Face, so he can hear her amazing voice. Ruth duly impresses him. Later, Ruth apologizes to Boaz for underestimating him. When asked why she is so distrustful, she explains she lived in three different foster homes as a child, so finds it difficult to open up.

Ruth continues working with Baby Face, leading to producing a song. She and Boaz also grow closer over the next month. Bree warns Ruth that Sy and Wolf have seen the karaoke video, so they now know she is in Tennessee.

Naomi's blood pressure spikes, so Ruth rushes to the hospital. Meanwhile, Sy and Wolf appear at the local bar. Speaking to Boaz, he instinctively says little about Ruth. Regardless, Sy thanks him and leaves.

Naomi advises Ruth to not run from love. At the Harvest Festival, Ruth dedicates an original song to Boaz, thanking him for opening her heart. She stumbles midway, upon spotting Sy, but finds the strength to finish.

A fire breaks out in the vineyard storage facility, which completely burns down. Ruth, realizing it was Sy, tells Boaz goodbye, then goes home to Naomi's to pack. Sy insists Ruth leave with him. When Naomi refuses to let her leave, there is a struggle. As Sy and Wolf are dragging Ruth out to their vehicle, Boaz, then the police, arrive. Naomi defends Ruth, calling her daughter.

The 2017 reserve 'R&B' survives the fire, then wins best in show.

== Cast ==
- Serayah as Ruth
- Tyler Lepley as Boaz
- Phylicia Rashad as Naomi, Ruth's mother-in-law
- Kenneth "Babyface" Edmonds as himself
- Gregory Alan Williams as Eli
- Walnette Carrington as Lena
- James Lee Thomas as Syrus
- Jermaine Dupri as himself
- Chaundre Hall-Broomfield as Marlon
- Nijah Brenea as Breana
- Zuri Soyinka as Devin
- Mike Forbs as Wolf
- Darryl W. Handy as Pastor Charles
- Jim Gleason as Ronan Vibert
- Lecrae as Sauce

== Music ==
The film features songs from Serayah with a duet of "Goodness of God" (Bethel Music) with multiple Grammy Award winner Babyface which was recorded live.

== Reception ==
The New York Times and several other media outlets published reviews of the film.
