= Tyler Lepley =

American actor (born 1987)

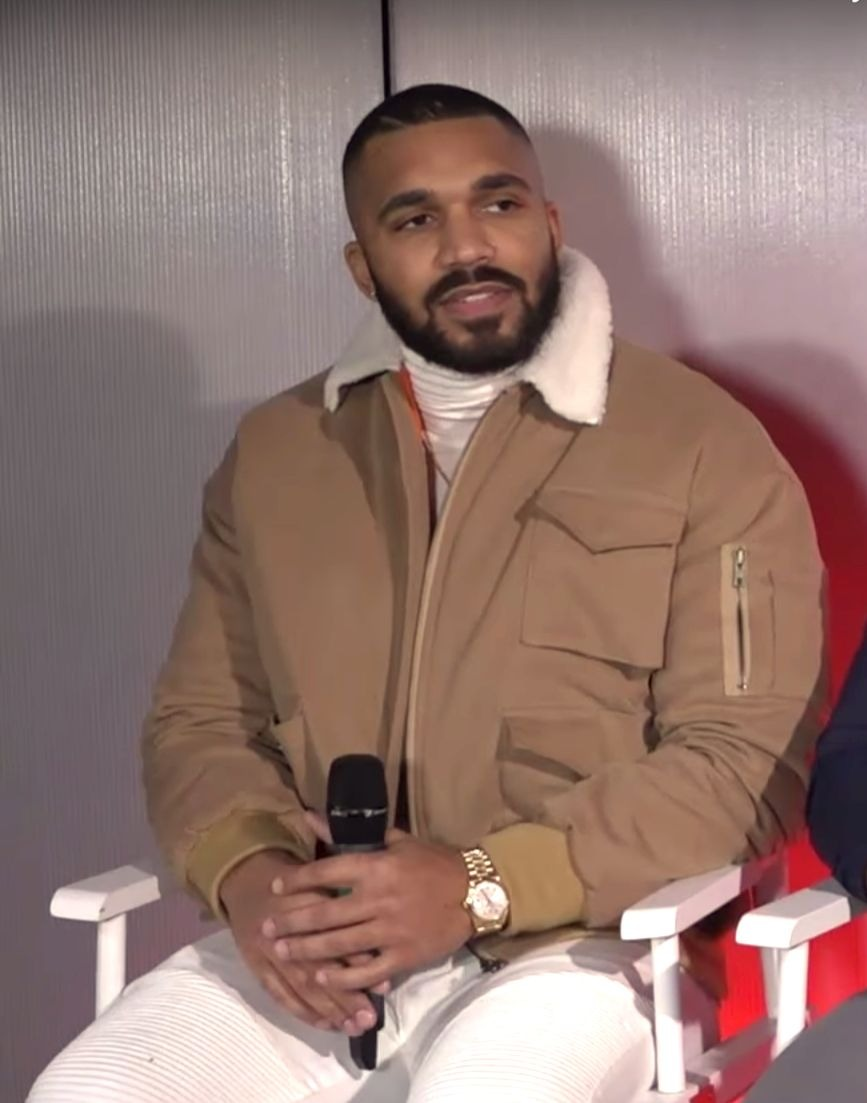
- Lepley in 2017
- Born: March 24, 1987 (age 39); Doylestown, Pennsylvania, U.S.
- Education: Kutztown University
- Occupations: Actor; personal trainer; rapper
- Years active: 2009–present
- Spouse: Miracle Watts (m. 2026)
- Children: 3

Tyler Lepley (born March 24, 1987) is an American actor who portrayed Benjamin "Benny" Young on the Tyler Perry produced prime time soap opera The Haves and the Have Nots; which was the first scripted television series to air on the Oprah Winfrey Network.

== Early life and education ==
Lepley was born and raised in Doylestown, Pennsylvania by his mother and stepfather, who has been in his life since the age of 6. Lepley is Italian on his mother's side and Jamaican on his biological father's side. Lepley revealed that he was teased as a child because he was the only biracial kid in his school. He graduated from Central Bucks High School West in Doylestown. Lepley did several sports including track, football, basketball, karate—as a young child—and boxing but focused more on football as he got older.

Lepley played football in high school under the name Tyler Dinnis. In June 2003, he suffered an injury which nearly ended his football career and later underwent surgery. By the summer of 2004, Lepley was back on the field and was selected as the MVP at sports camp for Villanova University. He attended Kutztown University on a football scholarship. Lepley played football for the university until the fall of 2007. He went on to graduate from Kutztown in 2010 with a degree in criminal justice. Lepley accepted a friend's offer to relocate to Los Angeles in 2011 and found work as a personal trainer at Iron Fitness Gym in Santa Monica.

== Career ==
About three months after he settled in Los Angeles, Lepley was discovered by a producer at a boxing gym who invited him to audition. From that meeting, he booked a small role in an independent film Slumber Party Slaughter. Lepley reluctantly took his agent's advice to get serious about acting and enrolled in acting classes. In 2013, he booked the role of Benny on Tyler Perry's The Haves and the Have Nots after a long casting process. Lepley was quite surprised when Perry came to the audition dressed as his famous Madea character because he was shooting a movie at the time. Lepley also appeared in the universally panned 2013 comedy Baggage Claim starring Paula Patton.

In early 2016, Lepley booked the lead role of Jaxon in the made-for-television film, produced by Swirl Films Ringside, directed by Russ Parr. The film premiered in September 2016 TV One. His costars included Everybody Hates Chris actor Tequan Richmond and R&B singer Sevyn Streeter. In 2019, Lepley was cast a series regular in the Starz drama, P-Valley. In 2020, he was cast in Harlem, Tracy Oliver's comedy series on Amazon Prime Video.

In late 2025, Lepley’s Tampa restaurant Lepley’s Kitchen & Lounge permanently closed.

== Personal life ==
On July 25, 2026, Lepley married actress Miracle Watts in Mexico. In October 2022, they welcomed their first child together, a son named Xi Lei. Lepley has two children, Leo and Jade from a previous relationship with April King.

== Filmography ==
=== Film ===
Year	Title	Role	Notes
2012	Dirty People	Detective Dave	
2013	Sake-Bomb	Bar patron	
2013	Baggage Claim	Curtis	
2013	Hollywood Chaos	Victor Reins	
2016	Ringside	Jaxon Holley	TV Movie
2019	Three's Complicated	Sonny	TV Movie
2019	About The People	The Executive	Short Movie
2025	Duplicity	Tony	
2025	Buried Alive & Survived	Victor	lifetime
2025	Ruth & Boaz	Boaz	
2026	Pushed Off a Plane and Survived	Cole	TV Movie

=== Television ===
Year	Title	Role	Notes
2012	90210	Gym Guy	Episode: "It's All Fun and Games"
2013–21	The Haves and the Have Nots	Benjamin "Benny" Young	Series regular
2019	Tales	Micah	Episode: "Ex-Factor"
2020	P-Valley	Diamond	Series regular
2021–25	Harlem	Ian	Series regular
