= Left Behind (disambiguation) =

Left Behind is a series of 16 best-selling novels by Tim LaHaye and Jerry B. Jenkins, and the title of the first novel in the series.

Left Behind may also refer to:

== Film ==
- Left Behind (film series)
  - Left Behind: The Movie, 2000 film
  - Left Behind II: Tribulation Force, 2002 film
  - Left Behind: World at War, 2005 film
- Left Behind (2014 film), an American apocalyptic thriller film, based on the novel
- Left Behind: Rise of the Antichrist, 2023 sequel to the 2014 film
- The Left Behind (2019 film), a British television drama

== Television ==
- "Left Behind" (Arrow), a 2015 episode
- "Left Behind" (The Last of Us), a 2023 episode
- "Left Behind" (Legends of Tomorrow), a 2016 episode
- "Left Behind" (Lost), a 2007 episode
- "Left Behind" (The Simpsons), a 2018 episode

== Music ==
- "Left Behind" (A-Mei song), 2017
- "Left Behind" (CSS song), 2008
- "Left Behind" (Slipknot song), 2001
- "Left Behind", a song by Grandson from Death of an Optimist, 2020
- "Left Behind", a song by tUnE-yArDs from Nikki Nack, 2014
- "The Left Behind", a song by Manic Street Preachers from Resistance Is Futile, 2018

== Video games ==
- The Last of Us: Left Behind, a 2014 expansion for The Last of Us
- Left Behind series:
  - Left Behind: Eternal Forces, a 2006 real-time strategy game
  - Left Behind 2: Tribulation Forces, released 2008
  - Left Behind 3: Rise of the Antichrist, released 2010
  - Left Behind 4: World at War, released 2011

== See also ==
- Serenity: Those Left Behind, a comic published by Dark Horse Comics
