= Left Behind: The Kids =

Book series

- The Vanishings (1998)
- Author: Tim LaHaye, Jerry B. Jenkins and Chris Fabry
- Country: United States
- Language: English
- Genre: Christian / Dystopian fiction
- Publisher: Tyndale House
- Published: 1998–2004
- Media type: Print (Paperback)
- No. of books: 40

Left Behind: The Kids (stylized as LEFT BEHIND >THE KIDS<) is a series of young adult speculative fiction novellas based on the Left Behind series, published by Tyndale House from 1998 to 2005. Written by Jerry B. Jenkins, Tim LaHaye, with uncredited contributions from Chris Fabry, The Kids follows a group of young Christians as they experience the Rapture and Great Tribulation.

The novellas contain elements of science fiction, science fantasy, utopian and dystopian fiction, mystery, and horror, woven within an evangelical narrative.

Dramatizations of the novellas were produced for Christian radio by EarFlix. The series was conceived as a sequence of 48 novellas, but only forty were published.

== Characters ==
- Judd Thompson Jr. — On the night on the Rapture, Judd had run away using his father's credit card to book a flight to London. The same flight Rayford was the pilot for.
- Vicki Byrne — Vicki grew up in a trailer park, and hated it because people regularly made fun of her and her family by calling them "Trailer Trash".
- Lionel Washington — Son of Buck's editor who was taken in the rapture. Lionel is the only character to also appear in the main Left Behind novels.
- Ryan Daley — Initially a non-believer, he was the last of the four main characters to become a believer.

== The Kids (1998–2004) ==
Left Behind: The Kids was published in paperback format. Turtleback Books released library binding editions.

No.	Novella	Date	ISBN
1	The Vanishings	July 1998	0-8423-2193-4
2	Second Chance	July 1998	0-8423-2194-2
3	Through the Flames	July 1998	0-8423-2195-0
4	Facing the Future	July 1998	0-8423-2196-9
5	Nicolae High	September 1999	0-8423-4325-3
6	The Underground	September 1999	0-8423-4326-1
7	Busted!	March 2000	0-8423-4327-X
8	Death Strike	March 2000	0-8423-4328-8
9	The Search	July 2000	0-8423-4329-6
10	On the Run	July 2000	0-8423-4330-X
11	Into the Storm	November 2000	0-8423-4331-8
12	Earthquake!	November 2000	0-8423-4332-6
13	The Showdown	February 2001	0-8423-4294-X
14	Judgment Day	February 2001	0-8423-4295-8
15	Battling the Commander	June 2001	0-8423-4296-6
16	Fire from Heaven	June 2001	0-8423-4297-4
17	Terror in the Stadium	October 2001	0-8423-4299-0
18	Darkening Skies	October 2001	0-8423-4312-1
19	Attack of Apollyon	March 2002	0-8423-4313-X
20	A Dangerous Plan	March 2002	0-8423-4314-8
21	Secrets of New Babylon	July 2002	0-8423-4315-6
22	Escape from New Babylon	July 2002	0-8423-4316-4
23	Horsemen of Terror	October 2002	0-8423-4317-2
24	Uplink from the Underground	October 2002	0-8423-4318-0
25	Death at the Gala	March 2003	0-8423-5789-0
26	The Beast Arises	March 2003	0-8423-5790-4
27	Wildfire!	May 2003	0-8423-5791-2
28	The Mark of the Beast	May 2003	0-8423-5792-0
29	Breakout!	June 2003	0-8423-5793-9
30	Murder in the Holy Place	June 2003	0-8423-5794-7
31	Escape to Masada	September 2003	0-8423-5801-3
32	War of the Dragon	September 2003	0-8423-5802-1
33	Attack on Petra	January 2004	0-8423-5803-X
34	Bounty Hunters	January 2004	0-8423-5804-8
35	The Rise of False Messiahs	May 2004	0-8423-5805-6
36	Ominous Choices	May 2004	0-8423-5807-2
37	Heat Wave	August 2004	0-8423-8347-6
38	The Perils of Love	August 2004	0-8423-8348-4
39	The Road to War	September 2004	0-8423-8349-2
40	Triumphant Return	September 2004	0-8423-8350-6

== The Young Trib Force (2003–2005) ==
Left Behind: The Young Trib Force is a series of bind up volumes. New material by Chris Fabry links each volume to a novel in the main series.

‡ Includes uncredited contributions from Chris Fabry.

Vol.	Bind up	Includes...	Date	ISBN	Linked with...
1	Taken	The Vanishings	October 2003	0-8423-8351-4	Left Behind (1995)
1	Taken	Second Chance	October 2003	0-8423-8351-4	Left Behind (1995)
1	Taken	Through the Flames	October 2003	0-8423-8351-4	Left Behind (1995)
1	Taken	Facing the Future	October 2003	0-8423-8351-4	Left Behind (1995)
2	Pursued	Nicolae High	October 2003	0-8423-8352-2	Tribulation Force (1996)
2	Pursued	The Underground ‡	October 2003	0-8423-8352-2	Tribulation Force (1996)
2	Pursued	Busted! ‡	October 2003	0-8423-8352-2	Tribulation Force (1996)
2	Pursued	Death Strike ‡	October 2003	0-8423-8352-2	Tribulation Force (1996)
3	Hidden	The Search ‡	January 2004	0-8423-8353-0	Nicolae (1997)
3	Hidden	On the Run	January 2004	0-8423-8353-0	Nicolae (1997)
3	Hidden	Into the Storm ‡	January 2004	0-8423-8353-0	Nicolae (1997)
3	Hidden	Earthquake! ‡	January 2004	0-8423-8353-0	Nicolae (1997)
4	Rescued	The Showdown ‡	February 2004	0-8423-8354-9	Soul Harvest (1998)
4	Rescued	Judgment Day ‡	February 2004	0-8423-8354-9	Soul Harvest (1998)
4	Rescued	Battling the Commander ‡	February 2004	0-8423-8354-9	Soul Harvest (1998)
4	Rescued	Fire from Heaven ‡	February 2004	0-8423-8354-9	Soul Harvest (1998)
5	Stung	Terror in the Stadium ‡	July 2004	0-8423-8355-7	Apollyon (1999)
5	Stung	Darkening Skies ‡	July 2004	0-8423-8355-7	Apollyon (1999)
5	Stung	Attack of Apollyon	July 2004	0-8423-8355-7	Apollyon (1999)
6	Frantic	A Dangerous Plan ‡	July 2004	0-8423-8356-5	Assassins (1999)
6	Frantic	Secrets of New Babylon	July 2004	0-8423-8356-5	Assassins (1999)
6	Frantic	Escape from New Babylon ‡	July 2004	0-8423-8356-5	Assassins (1999)
7	Shaken	Horsemen of Terror ‡	February 2005	1-4143-0268-1	The Indwelling (2000)
7	Shaken	Uplink from the Underground ‡	February 2005	1-4143-0268-1	The Indwelling (2000)
7	Shaken	Death at the Gala ‡	February 2005	1-4143-0268-1	The Indwelling (2000)
8	Unmasked	The Beast Arises ‡	February 2005	1-4143-0269-X	The Mark (2000)
8	Unmasked	Wildfire! ‡	February 2005	1-4143-0269-X	The Mark (2000)
8	Unmasked	The Mark of the Beast ‡	February 2005	1-4143-0269-X	The Mark (2000)
9	Deceived	Breakout!	April 2005	1-4143-0270-3	Desecration (2001)
9	Deceived	Murder in the Holy Place ‡	April 2005	1-4143-0270-3	Desecration (2001)
9	Deceived	Escape to Masada ‡	April 2005	1-4143-0270-3	Desecration (2001)
10	Protected	War of the Dragon ‡	April 2005	1-4143-0271-1	The Remnant (2002)
10	Protected	Attack on Petra ‡	April 2005	1-4143-0271-1	The Remnant (2002)
10	Protected	Bounty Hunters ‡	April 2005	1-4143-0271-1	The Remnant (2002)
11	Hunted	The Rise of False Messiahs	May 2005	1-4143-0272-X	Armageddon (2002)
11	Hunted	Ominous Choices ‡	May 2005	1-4143-0272-X	Armageddon (2002)
11	Hunted	Heat Wave ‡	May 2005	1-4143-0272-X	Armageddon (2002)
12	Arrived	The Perils of Love ‡	May 2005	1-4143-0273-8	Glorious Appearing (2004)
12	Arrived	The Road to War ‡	May 2005	1-4143-0273-8	Glorious Appearing (2004)
12	Arrived	Triumphant Return ‡	May 2005	1-4143-0273-8	Glorious Appearing (2004)

== See also ==
- Vanished – Left Behind: Next Generation – 2016 film directed by Larry A. McLean
