= Left Behind (film series) =

Film series

- Based on: Left Behind by: Tim LaHaye & Jerry B. Jenkins; Left Behind: The Kids; Tim LaHaye & Jerry B. Jenkins
- Countries: Canada; United States
- Box office: $18.2 million

The Left Behind film series, consists of American Christian thrillers based on the book series of the same name co-authored by Tim LaHaye and Jerry B. Jenkins; with three original direct-to-home video films, followed by a reboot series with two theatrical films and a spin-off film.

The first three movies were produced by Cloud Ten Pictures. Kirk Cameron stars as Buck Williams, with Brad Johnson, Janaya Stephens, Clarence Gilyard Jr., Gordon Currie, Chelsea Noble, Colin Fox, and Academy Award winner Louis Gossett Jr. featuring in supporting roles. Each release received mostly negative reception from critics, with each release being criticized their low budget production quality.

The reboot series and the spin-off film, all similarly received poor critical reception. The franchise additionally includes a modern-day documentary film titled, The Original Left Behind (1994), directed by Marjonneke Tjerkstra.

== Films ==
=== Direct-to-Video ===
Film	U.S. release date	Director	Screenwriters	Producers
Original series
Left Behind: The Movie	October 31, 2000	Vic Sarin	Alan McElroy, Paul Lalonde & Joe Goodman	Ralph Winter, Joe Goodman, Paul Lalonde and Peter Lalonde
Left Behind II: Tribulation Force	October 29, 2002	Bill Corcoran	Paul Lalonde & John Patus	Nicholas B. Tabarrok and Peter Lalonde
Left Behind: World at War	October 21, 2005	Craig R. Baxley	Paul Lalonde, Peter Lalonde & André van Heerden	Nicholas Tabarrok, Peter Lalonde and André van Heerden

- The Original Left Behind (1994) – Documentary released direct-to-video

=== Theatrical ===
Film	U.S. release date	Director	Screenwriters	Producers
Reboot series
Left Behind	October 3, 2014	Vic Armstrong	Paul Lalonde & John Patus	Paul LaLonde, Michael Walker and Ed Clydesdale
Left Behind: Rise of the Antichrist	January 26, 2023	Kevin Sorbo	Paul Lalonde, John Patus, & Jessica Parker	Paul LaLonde, Michael Walker, Ed Clydesdale, John Duffy, James Quattrochi and Jason Wan Lim
Spin-off film
Vanished – Left Behind: Next Generation	September 28, 2016	Larry A. McLean	Kim Beyer-Johnson & Joan Considine Johnson	Randy LaHaye, Karl Horstmann and Dale Weller

== Main cast and characters ==
List indicators

This section includes characters who will appear or have appeared in the franchise.

- An empty grey cell indicates the character was not in the film, or that the character's official presence has not yet been confirmed.
- ^{C} indicates a cameo role.

Character	Film					
Character	Original series			Reboot series		Spin-off film
Character	Left Behind: The Movie	Left Behind II: Tribulation Force	Left Behind: World at War	Left Behind	Left Behind: Rise of the Antichrist	Vanished – Left Behind: Next Generation
Character	2000	2002	2005	2014	2023	2016
Rayford Steele	Brad Johnson	Brad Johnson	Brad Johnson	Nicolas Cage	Kevin Sorbo	
Chloe Steele	Janaya Stephens	Janaya Stephens	Janaya Stephens	Cassi Thomson	Sarah Fisher	
Cameron "Buck" Williams	Kirk Cameron	Kirk Cameron	Kirk Cameron	Chad Michael Murray	Greg Perrow	
Bruce Barnes	Clarence Gilyard Jr.	Clarence Gilyard Jr.	Arnold Pinnock	Lance E. Nichols	Charles Andrew Payne	William Gabriel Grier
Hattie Durham	Chelsea Noble	Chelsea Noble	Chelsea Noble	Nicky Whelan	Kate Winter	
Nicolae Carpathia The Antichrist	Gordon Currie (Note: The character is named as Nikolai Carpathia, in the original three films.)	Gordon Currie	Gordon Currie		Bailey Chase	Randy LaHaye^{C}
Steve Plank	Thomas Hauff	Christopher Bondy			Corbin Bernsen	
Amanda White			Laura Catalano		Sam Sorbo	
Jonathan Stonagal	Daniel Pilon				Neal McDonough	

== Additional crew and production details ==
Film	Crew/Detail					
Film	Composer(s)	Cinematographer	Editor	Production companies	Distributing companies	Running time
Main series
Left Behind: The Movie	James Covell	George Tirl	Michael Pacek	Cloud Ten Pictures, Namesake Entertainment	Cloud Ten Pictures	1 hr 40 mins
Left Behind II: Tribulation Force	Gary Koftinoff	Michael Storey	Michael Doherty	Cloud Ten Pictures, Namesake Entertainment	Cloud Ten Pictures	1 hr 34 mins
Left Behind: World at War	Gary Chang	David Connell	Sonny Baskin	Cloud Ten Pictures, Columbia Pictures	Sony Pictures Releasing	1 hr 35 mins
Reboot series
Left Behind (2014)	Jack Lenz	Jack Green	Michael J. Duthie	Entertainment One, Stoney Lake Entertainment	Freestyle Releasing LLC	1 hr 50 mins
Left Behind: Rise of the Antichrist	Tyler Bragg	Charles Hamilton	Chris Bragg	Amcromi Entertainment, Stonagal Pictures	Fathom Entertainment, 101 Films International	1 hr 58 mins
Spin-off film
Vanished – Left Behind: Next Generation	Josh Debney, Andy Grush & BJ Davis	Pete Wages	Gordon McClellan	Triple Horse Studios, EchoLight Studios, Salt Entertainment Group	EchoLight Studios	1 hr 28 mins
