= The Rising (LaHaye novel) =

2005 novel by Tim LaHaye and Jerry B. Jenkins

The Rising: Antichrist is Born/Before They Were Left Behind
- First edition cover
- Author: Tim LaHaye and Jerry B. Jenkins
- Cover artist: Micheal Hudson/Photodisc
- Language: English
- Series: Left Behind series
- Genre: Christian fiction Speculative Fiction
- Publisher: Tyndale House Publishers
- Publication date: Thursday, March 31, 2005
- Publication place: United States
- Media type: Print (Hardcover & Paperback); Audiobook
- Pages: 380 pages
- ISBN: 0-8423-6056-5 (hardcover)
- OCLC: 57124481
- Dewey Decimal: 813/.54 22
- LC Class: PS3562.A315 R57 2005
- Followed by: The Regime

The Rising: Antichrist is Born/Before They Were Left Behind is the thirteenth novel in the Left Behind series and the first prequel. It was written by Tim LaHaye and Jerry B. Jenkins and published on Thursday, March 31, 2005. The hardback edition has the title and subtitle as The Rising: Before They Were Left Behind. It takes place 32–9 years before the Rapture.

== Plot introduction ==
The Rising is Prequel 1 of 3 in the books leading up to the events mentioned in Left Behind itself. It focuses 32 years before the main Left Behind series starts.

Marilena Carpathia has only one dream: to be a mother. So when a mysterious clairvoyant promises the fulfillment of this dream, Marilena does not hesitate. Through genetic engineering and the power of the Prince of Darkness himself, Marilena is about to become a chosen vessel, an exact contrary to the Virgin Mary, one who will unknowingly give birth to the greatest evil the world has ever known.

Halfway around the world, God's plans are subtly being carried out too. Young Ray Steele is determined to avoid one day taking over the family business. Instead, Ray sets his heart on becoming a pilot.

Soon Carpathia and Steele's lives will intersect. And good and evil will clash in an explosion that will shake the world.

== Plot summary ==
The Rising deals with Rayford Steele's childhood and college days, and how he nearly married another woman. A conflict between father and son as Ray decides to become an airline pilot against his father's wishes.

Also featured is the birth of Nicolae Carpathia, who would later rise up in Nicolae as the Antichrist. Marilena is a simple Romanian woman who is overcome by the need to have a baby. Her husband, Sorin, does not love his wife anymore and is revealed to be a homosexual. Thus, Marilena reads an ad for a group to find something "Beyond themselves", and meets Viviana Ivinisova, later known as Viv Ivins.

Viviana is a Russian who talks with the spirit world. She is a Luciferian, and says that loyalty to her lord can bring Marilena the baby she wants so badly. However, this baby comes through genetic engineering with the best traits of two sperm mixed into a hybrid sperm, which is fused with the egg. At first, it is unknown who Nicolae's two biological fathers are. (Later, they are found out to be Sorin and his lover.) After giving birth and realizing the amazing talent her son possesses, while showing no concern for her, Marilena discovers Viv's plans for the prodigy child.

Jonathan Stonagal is the financier of Nicolae's education. However, Marilena disagrees with these plans so much that she is finally assassinated; however, Nicolae is the one who plans her death through poisoning. Nicolae has his first taste of fame in a TIME Magazine article at a young age, graduates Secondary School early and graduates University in under 2 years and after learning of his parentage, he orders the deaths of both his fathers. After he becomes a multi-millionaire through Stonagal, Nicolae is taken by a demon to the desert, where he is forced to remain without food or water for forty days. In a contrast to Jesus' temptation, Nicolae falls to all three temptations. After this, Nicolae is returned to Romania.

Meanwhile, Ray Steele deals with his father, who is determined to have Ray take over the family business. Ray has his own dreams of becoming a pilot, and joins ROTC to attend college, where he meets and almost marries Kitty. However, Ray has second thoughts about the latter, and breaks up with her. Furthermore, he later dates his friend Irene, and they get married after a while. Chloe Steele is born during this time as well. After befriending a woman named Jackie, Irene slowly begins to feel something is missing in her life. Jackie, a Christian, lays out God's plan of salvation, and Irene accepts Christ.

== Characters ==
- Rayford Steele
- Nicolae "Nicky", "Nick" Carpathia
- Dr. Sorin Carpathia, dies in this book
- Baduna Marius, dies in this book
- Dr. Marilena Carpathia
- Viviana Ivinisova
- Reiche Planchette
- Jonathan Stonagal
- Irene Steele
- Hattie Durham
- Raymie Steele
- Chloe Steele
- Robert "Bobby" Stark
- Mr. and Mrs. Stark
- Mr. and Mrs. Steele
- Jackie
- Katherine "Kitty" Wyile
- Fuzzy Belman
- Commander Olson, An officer at ROTC
- Christopher "Chris" Smith
- Earl Halliday
- Janet Allen

== Release details ==
- 2005, U.S.: Tyndale House (ISBN 0-8423-6056-5), Pub date 31 March 2005, hardback (First edition)
- 2006, U.S.: Tyndale House (ISBN 0-8423-6193-6), Pub date ? September 2005, paperback
