= Left Behind =

Multimedia franchise based on the novels by Tim LaHaye and Jerry B. Jenkins

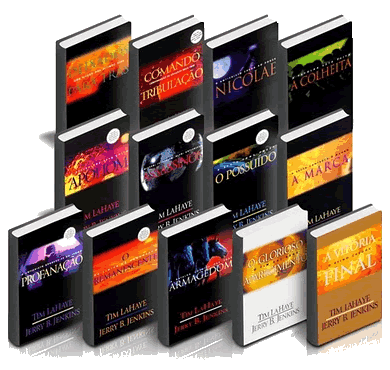
- The Rising, The Regime, and The Rapture (omitted here); Left Behind, Tribulation Force, Nicolae, Soul Harvest, Apollyon, Assassins, The Indwelling, The Mark, Desecration, The Remnant, Armageddon, Glorious Appearing, and Kingdom Come (Brazilian editions)
- Author: Tim LaHaye; Jerry B. Jenkins
- Country: United States
- Language: English
- Genre: Christian novels
- Published: 1995–2007
- Media type: Print (hardback & paperback)

Left Behind is a multimedia franchise of apocalyptic fiction written by Tim LaHaye and Jerry B. Jenkins, released by Tyndale House Publishers from 1995 to 2007. The bestselling novels are Christian eschatological narratives expounding LaHaye's dispensationalist interpretation of the New Testament's Book of Revelation. This includes the rapture of Christian believers prior to a tumultuous seven-year period known as the Great Tribulation, the main conflict narrated by the original 12 books. After rising to power, the Antichrist installs a new world order that oppresses Christian converts and forces them into hiding until Jesus's Second Coming, preceding a thousand years of peace.

The series has achieved significant commercial success, with multiple titles reaching the top of The New York Times Best Seller list and over 65 million copies sold worldwide by 2016. Critically, the series has been both influential and controversial, reflecting shifts in American evangelicalism, particularly a move toward political and social activism and a more divisive view of non-Christians. Scholars and critics have noted its triumphalist theology, perceived anti-Catholicism, sensational depictions of violence, and alignment with conspiratorial fears of globalism and one-world government, themes that some link to later movements, including QAnon. While praised by figures such as Jerry Falwell for its religious impact, others have criticized its theology, political messaging, and literary quality, with some viewing it as representative of American exceptionalism and neoliberal values.

The series has been adapted into five films. The original series of three films are Left Behind: The Movie (2000), Left Behind II: Tribulation Force (2002), and Left Behind: World at War (2005). A reboot starring Nicolas Cage, entitled Left Behind, was released in 2014 through Cloud Ten Pictures. A sequel, Left Behind: Rise of the Antichrist, directed by and starring Kevin Sorbo, was released in 2023. The series inspired an audio drama as well as the PC game Left Behind: Eternal Forces (2006) and its several sequels.

== Books ==
=== Main series ===
Left Behind tells an apocalyptic story about the ending of Earth (set in the contemporary era) over a period of seven years. The true believers in Jesus Christ have been raptured (taken instantly to heaven), leaving non-believers behind on Earth, now a shattered and chaotic world. As people scramble for answers, an obscure Romanian politician named Nicolae Jetty Carpathia rises to become secretary-general of the United Nations, promising to restore peace and stability to all nations. What most of the world does not realize is that Carpathia is actually the Antichrist foretold in the Bible. Coming to grips with the truth and becoming born-again Christians, airline pilot Rayford Steele, his daughter Chloe, their pastor Bruce Barnes, and young journalist Cameron "Buck" Williams begin their quest as the Tribulation Force to help save the lost and prepare for the coming Tribulation, in which God will rain down judgment on the world for seven years.

According to James Bielo, it is based on a dispensationalist interpretation of prophecies in the Biblical books of Revelation, Daniel, Isaiah and Ezekiel.

Published order	Chronological order	Title (with subtitle)	Published date
1	4	Left Behind: A Novel of the Earth's Last Days	1995
2	5	Tribulation Force: The Continuing Drama of Those Left Behind	1996
3	6	Nicolae: The Rise of Antichrist	1997
4	7	Soul Harvest: The World Takes Sides	1998
5	8	Apollyon: The Destroyer Is Unleashed	1999
6	9	Assassins: Assignment: Jerusalem, Target: Antichrist	1999
7	10	The Indwelling: The Beast Takes Possession	2000
8	11	The Mark: The Beast Rules the World	2000
9	12	Desecration: Antichrist Takes the Throne	2001
10	13	The Remnant: On the Brink of Armageddon	2002
11	14	Armageddon: The Cosmic Battle of the Ages	2003
12	15	Glorious Appearing: The End of Days	2004
13	1	The Rising: Antichrist is Born: Before They Were Left Behind	2005
14	2	The Regime: Evil Advances: Before They Were Left Behind #2	2005
15	3	The Rapture: In the Twinkling of an Eye: Countdown to Earth's Last Days #3	2006
16	16	Kingdom Come: The Final Victory	2007

==== Influences on the authors ====
LaHaye and Jenkins cite the influence of Russell Doughten, an Iowa-based filmmaker who directed the Thief in the Night series, a series of four low-budget but popular feature-length films in the 1970s and 1980s about the Rapture and Second Coming, starting with 1972's A Thief in the Night. Indeed, the title Left Behind echoes the refrain of Thief's early Christian rock theme song by Larry Norman, "I Wish We'd All Been Ready," in which he sings, "There's no time to change your mind, the Son has come and you've been left behind."

The success of Frank Peretti's pioneering Christian spiritual warfare thrillers in the 1980s and 1990s was a significant influence on the authors as well.

== Reception ==
Multiple books in the series have been on the New York Times Bestseller List. Starting in 2000, Books 7 and 8 reached number one on the list followed by book 10, which debuted at number one.

In 2016, several books in the series were bestsellers and 65 million copies were sold in various languages.

=== Critical response ===
==== Evangelical shift and views on non-Christians ====
In 1999, journalist Adam Davidson placed the series in the context of a shift in evangelical views over the last several decades on non-believers. He argues that evangelicals went from "[not yet knowing] who they were in the American public sphere" in the 1960s and early 1970s to a "major shift in evangelical thought which allowed for political and social activism" by the late 1990s, more negative and divisive. Evangelicals, Davidson states, had previously been more separatist, with little interest in attempting to create large-scale religious, moral, and political change. He uses the 1972 Christian end-times film A Thief in the Night as an example of this former approach, with its compassionate view towards unbelievers: "This is a portrait of regular people who don't know what to do and happen to make the wrong choice". In contrast, Left Behind, he contends, has a contemptuous and triumphant view of non-Christians and their suffering in the end times that he sees as symptomatic of a larger change in evangelicalism.

While predicting the apocalypse may be a constant, the way evangelicals think about it has undergone a massive overhaul. The progression (or regression) is the move from rural towns to the halls of power. It's the expansion of the evangelical sphere of concern from the very local (my friends, my church) to the national and global (my president, my international policy). It's a move from a complex view of the individual to an oversimplification that identifies everyone as either good-believer or bad-heathen. It's also a change in sentiment towards the unbeliever from sadness, caring, and invitation to triumph, judgement, and dismissal. It's a chilling mutation, and has entrenched evangelical Christianity in an antagonism to secular America that borders, at times, on cruelty.

While writing that the series fulfills the norms of mass-market fiction, magazine writer Michelle Goldberg also characterized the books as an attack on Judaism and liberal secularism, and suggested that the near-future "end times" in which the books are set seem to reflect the actual worldview of millions of Americans, including many prominent conservative leaders.

==== Anti-Catholicism ====
The books are written from an evangelical Protestant viewpoint. Some believe the books are anti-Catholic, noting that many Catholics were not raptured, concluding that no religion is free of false converts and that the new pope establishes a false religion. While the fictional Pope, John XXIV, was raptured, he is described as "promoting Lutheran reform", and it is implied that he was raptured for this reason. His successor, Pope Peter II, becomes Pontifex Maximus of Enigma Babylon One World Faith, an amalgam of all remaining world faiths and religions. Catholic Answers describes the series as anti-Catholic.

The co-author of the book, Jerry B. Jenkins, as well as LaHaye, stated that their books are not anti-Catholic and that they have many faithful Catholic readers and friends. According to LaHaye, "the books don't suggest any particular theology, but try to introduce people to a more personal relationship with Jesus".

==== Violence and war ====
Some practicing Christians, evangelical and otherwise, along with non-Christians have shown concern that the social perspectives promoted in the Left Behind series unduly sensationalize the death and destruction of masses of people. Harvey Cox, a professor of divinity at Harvard, says part of the appeal of the books lies in the "lip-licking anticipation of all the blood", and Lutheran theologian Barbara Rossing, author of The Rapture Exposed: The Message of Hope in the Book of Revelation, said the books glorify violence. Additionally, Paul Nuechterlein accused the authors of re-sacralizing violence, adding that "we human beings are the ones who put our faith in superior firepower. But in the Left Behind novels, the darkness of that human, satanic violence is once again attributed to God". Time said "the nuclear frights of, say, Tom Clancy's The Sum of All Fears wouldn't fill a chapter in the Left Behind series. (Large chunks of several U.S. cities have been bombed to smithereens by page 110 of Book 3.)"

David Carlson, a Professor of Religious Studies and a member of the Greek Orthodox Church, wrote that the theology underpinning the Left Behind series promotes a "skewed view of the Christian faith that welcomes war and disaster, while dismissing peace efforts in the Middle East and elsewhere—all in the name of Christ".

B. D. Forbes "locates the series in the context of a well-established tradition of American popular culture...that presents the good-evil struggle as 'evil [coming] from the outside' with 'the solution [as] the destruction of the evil-doers".

==== Relationship to believed prophetic events ====
Several scholars comment on the series' setting in time and relationship to perceived real, future events: religious studies scholar Mark Juergensmeyer argues that the Left Behind books are seen as fictional representations of future events, drawing a connection between the future violence portrayed in the books and "the violence in imagined worlds in the here-and now". Similarly, Andrew Strombeck additionally links the books to Derrida's "spectral time": "neither the future nor the present but a kind of ghostly future that haunts the present". Glenn Shuck also contends that Left Behind "does not...describe an other-worldly dystopia: it provides the shock-value of uncanny recognition of the present in a different form." Doris Buss and Didi Herman write, "While there is clearly some element of drama and 'play' to the 'Left Behind' opus...the series remains, at its core, a statement of how the authors and many other conservative Christians believe this world will end and a new one begin. In their detail, the 'Left Behind' 'novels' are indistinguishable from many works of ostensible 'nonfiction' penned by other [Christian right] writers."

==== Apocalypticism, conspiratorialism, and militias ====
The series' focus on apocalypticism, totalitarian conspiracies, and militias has been noted by writers including Gershom Gorenberg, Michael Joseph Gross, and Andrew Strombeck. They note themes such as fear of one-world government (in the form of the United Nations led by the Antichrist), global religion, and global currency – fought against by militias "structurally equivalent to Christians". Didi Herman places the series' depiction of the United Nations as an anti-Christian organization intent on implementing globalism, and thereby the New World Order, in the context of Christian right end-times scenarios, along with Pat Robertson's New World Order and Hal Lindsey's Late Great Planet Earth. University of Notre Dame religion scholar Jason Springs regards the series' apocalypticism as one aspect that would later feed into the evangelical adoption of QAnon.

Laurie Goodstein, writing in 1998 for The New York Times, placed what she called the "Left Behind phenomenon" in the calendrical context of the approaching year 2000. Goodstein noted a 'proliferation' of similarly apocalyptic texts appearing at that time, by authors such as Jim Bakker and John Hagee. Goodstein cited the opinion of University of Wisconsin historian Paul Boyer, who described such authors as "cashing in on the public preoccupation with the year 2000".

==== American Century and American exceptionalism ====
Marisa Ronan places the series in the context of the American Century and American exceptionalism, "proving at the fin-de-siècle that not only was the twentieth century American, it was Christian". Ronan notes that American evangelicals are portrayed as taking center stage in the apocalypse, fighting a spiritual battle against the UN's successor – headed by the Antichrist – which in part seeks to usurp the superpower status of the United States.

==== End-times theology and premillennial dispensationalism ====
Along with some other rapture fiction novels, the Left Behind series demonstrates a specific interpretation of the Gospel and the Christian life, one with which many have taken issue theologically. The books have not sold particularly well outside of the United States. Dispensationalism remains a minority view among theologians. For instance, amillennial and postmillennial Christians do not believe in the same timeline of the Second Coming as premillennialists, while preterist Christians interpret the Book of Revelation as events that have already been fulfilled in the 1st century. Brian McLaren of the Emergent Church compares the Left Behind series to The Da Vinci Code, and states, "What the Left Behind novels do, the way they twist scripture toward a certain theological and political end, I think [Dan] Brown is twisting scripture, just to other political ends." John Dart, writing in Christian Century, characterized the works as "beam me up theology." Jason Springs argues that evangelical beliefs on the role of the modern state of Israel have been shaped by the books.

==== Neoliberalism ====
Andrew Strombeck focuses on the series' neoliberalism: "in the midst of the apocalypse, good is privatized and evil state-run"; he notes the characters' depictions as "rational market actors first, Christians second".

==== Pacing ====
One reason cited for the books' popularity is the quick pacing and action, and that they reflect the public's overall concern and fascination with the Apocalypse as portrayed in the biblical book of Revelation. Michelle Goldberg has written that, "On one level, the attraction of the Left Behind books isn't that much different from that of, say, Tom Clancy or Stephen King. The plotting is brisk and the characterizations Manichaean. People disappear and things blow up." The New York Times also compared the series to Clancy's works. However, those views are not universally shared. Other reviewers have called the series "almost laughably tedious" and "fatuous and boring."

== Related series ==
=== Left Behind: The Kids series ===
Left Behind: The Kids is a series of forty novellas written for teenagers. It has the same plot as the adult series, but the main protagonists are teenagers.

=== Spinoff books ===
Williams professor Glenn Shuck has written the book Marks of the Beast: The Left Behind Novels and the Struggle for Evangelical Identity, published by NYU Press in 2005. He followed this with a collection of original essays co-edited with Jeffrey J. Kripal of Rice University on the Esalen Institute in California, published by Indiana University Press in 2005.

Starting in 2003, the series was expanded upon by Mel Odom with his Apocalypse military series and Neesa Hart with her political thriller series, both taking place concurrently with the main series.

Author	Title (with subtitles)	Year published
Mel Odom	Apocalypse Dawn: The Battle Begins	2003
Mel Odom	Apocalypse Crucible: The Battle Continues	2004
Mel Odom	Apocalypse Burning: The Battle Lines Are Drawn	2004
Mel Odom	Apocalypse Unleashed: The Battle Rages On	2008
Neesa Hart	End of State: Now All the Rules Have Changed	2003
Neesa Hart	Impeachable Offense: The Conspiracy Grows	2004
Neesa Hart	Necessary Evils: A Time For Treason	2005

=== Graphic novels ===
In 2002, a series of graphic novels published by Tyndale House was launched that comprised the first two books in the series, Left Behind and Tribulation Force. The original idea was to release sets of three to five novels (each about 45–50 pages) for each book in the original series. However, after the fifth and final novel for Tribulation Force was released, the graphic novel series was discontinued, and the novels that were released are as of December 2006 out of print. A compilation of the graphic novels for the first book was later released as one novel.

== Film adaptations ==
The success of the Left Behind books has led to the release of five motion pictures based on the series so far. All four have been produced by brothers Paul and Peter LaLonde, and have been released through Cloud Ten Pictures, an independent Canadian-based Christian film studio.

The first, Left Behind: The Movie, was based on the first book of the series and was released in 2000. In a very unusual marketing scheme, the studio released the film on home video, and then theatrically. It fared poorly in theaters. The film starred former Growing Pains star Kirk Cameron as Buck Williams. Cameron, who praised the book series as "inspiring", became a practicing evangelist (and co-host with Ray Comfort on the TV show The Way of the Master).

The sequel, Left Behind II: Tribulation Force, based on the second book, Tribulation Force, was released in 2002. The film debuted at #2 on Nielson's video scan reports, behind Spider-Man, and was #1 in terms of overall sales for two days on Amazon.com.

The second sequel, World at War, was released first to churches on October 21, 2005, for church theatrical viewings and was released via home media on October 25. Much of the main cast from the previous two films, excluding Clarence Gilyard, reprised their respective roles for World at War. Gilyard, who played Bruce Barnes, was unable to return due to a scheduling conflict with a play in New York. It is based very loosely on the final 50 pages of Tribulation Force and features Louis Gossett Jr. as the President of the United States, Gerald Fitzhugh. The third installment was the least identifiable with events in any of the books. Recognizable events were the marriages of Buck with Chloe Steele, and of Rayford Steele with Amanda White; the death of Bruce Barnes; and President Fitzhugh's heading an attack, resulting in World War III, with Great Britain and Egypt fighting against the Global Community. Major parts, however, were taken from subsequent books; these events include the poisoning of Barnes by GC forces, instead of Nicolae Carpathia himself, and an attempt by Fitzhugh to assassinate Carpathia. Buck's meeting with the President in the books takes a different form in the film.

The film series have been criticized for, among other things, low production values. A Slate reviewer commented that in 2004, Cloud Ten Pictures made a deal with Sony Pictures Entertainment to release all of its pictures under their banner and has been doing so ever since.

In 2010, Cloud Ten announced that a remake of the Left Behind series was in development, with production set to begin in late 2012 for an October 2014 release date. The reboot, starring Nicolas Cage as Steele and Chad Michael Murray as Buck Williams, was released to theaters October 3, 2014. It focused mainly on the very beginnings of the first book and added much to the plot. The remake focuses on the experiences of the passengers on the plane and partially on Chloe Steele as she comes to terms with her missing family. It earned overwhelmingly negative reviews and flopped at the box office.

Vanished – Left Behind: Next Generation, a spin-off film based on the spin-off series Left Behind: The Kids released on September 28, 2016. The film was developed by Tim LaHaye's grandson, Randy LaHaye and was well received by the book author.

In November 2021, LaLonde announced the beginning of production on Left Behind: Rise of the Antichrist, acting as a direct sequel to the 2014 film, with Kevin Sorbo directing and replacing Nicolas Cage as Rayford Steele. The film is set six months after the events of the 2014 film and is an adaptation of the rest of book one in the series. The film makes a few small changes to be more relevant for modern times.

== Video game ==
A video game, Left Behind: Eternal Forces, (2006) and its three sequels, Left Behind: Tribulation Forces, Left Behind 3: Rise of the Antichrist and Left Behind 4: World at War, were developed by a publicly traded company, Left Behind Games. The games are real-time strategy games wherein the player controls a "Tribulation Forces" team and allows the player to "use the power of prayer to strengthen your troops in combat and wield modern military weaponry throughout the game world." The original game was released in the United States on November 14, 2006, and received mixed reviews. Distribution was initially planned to work through churches and megachurches.

Although the original game was accused of encouraging religious violence, not all reviewers of the game or critics of the Left Behind series shared that view. Representatives of the company have responded that the game's message is pacifist, because shooting nonbelievers instead of converting them costs the player "spirit points", which can be recovered by pausing to pray. The company also responded to these criticisms in an online newsletter, stating, "There is no violence, only conflict," and, "The most successful way to fight, is through the means of spiritual warfare; PRAYER and WORSHIP. Soldiers and military weaponry are available, but once anyone plays the game, they'll see how difficult it is to succeed by using these less effective means of warfare."

== Music ==
People Get Ready

Soundtrack album by Various artists
- Released: November 17, 1998
- Genre: Christian music
- Label: Forefront

The album People Get Ready: A Musical Collection Inspired by The Left Behind Series was released in 1998.

== See also ==
- Armageddon
- Christian theology
- Christian Zionism
- Covenantalism
- Futurism
- Hal Lindsey
- Historicism
- Idealism
- The Late Great Planet Earth
- Summary of Christian eschatological differences
- United Nations in popular culture
- Christian science fiction
- The Leftovers (novel)
- The Leftovers (TV series)
