= Left Behind: Rise of the Antichrist =

Film directed by Kevin Sorbo

- Film poster
- Directed by: Kevin Sorbo
- Written by: Paul LaLonde; John Patus; Jessica Parker
- Produced by: Paul LaLonde; Michael Walker; Jason Wan Lin; Ed Clydesdale; John Duffy; Kevin Sorbo; James Quattrochi
- Starring: Kevin Sorbo; Neal McDonough; Bailey Chase; Corbin Bernsen; Greg Perrow; Sarah Fisher; Sam Sorbo; Charles Andrew Payne; Stafford Perry
- Cinematography: Charles Hamilton
- Edited by: Chris Bragg
- Music by: Tyler Bragg
- Production companies: Amcromi Entertainment; Stonagal Pictures
- Distributed by: 101 Films International
- Release date: January 26, 2023
- Running time: 118 minutes
- Country: Canada
- Language: English
- Box office: $4.2 million

Left Behind: Rise of the Antichrist is a 2023 Canadian apocalyptic thriller film directed by Kevin Sorbo and co-written by Paul Lalonde. It stars Sorbo, Neal McDonough, Bailey Chase, Corbin Bernsen, Greg Perrow, Sarah Fisher, Sam Sorbo, Charles Andrew Payne and Stafford Perry. It serves as a sequel to 2014 reboot Left Behind, which itself is based on the 1995 novel of the same name written by Tim LaHaye and Jerry B. Jenkins.

The film was released on January 26, 2023 and received uniformly negative reviews from critics.

== Premise ==
The world is in chaos six months after the Rapture took millions of people, and a new charismatic leader named Nicolae Carpathia is gaining prominence. Unclear whether he can be trusted or if he has a larger plan that involves the Tribulation, the world will soon know his name.

== Cast ==
- Kevin Sorbo as Rayford Steele
- Neal McDonough as Jonathan Stonagal
- Bailey Chase as Nicolae Carpathia
- Corbin Bernsen as Steve Plank
- Greg Parrow as Cameron "Buck" Williams
- Sarah Fisher as Chloe Steele
- Sam Sorbo as Amanda White
- Charles Andrew Payne as Pastor Bruce Barnes
- Stafford Perry as Dirk
- David LeReaney as Chaim Rosenzweig
- Kathryn Kohut as Hattie Durham
- Braeden Sorbo as Connor

== Production ==
=== Development ===
In April 2015, Paul LaLonde launched an Indiegogo crowdfunding campaign, asking for $500,000 in contributions. In July 2017, LaLonde announced on the film's Facebook page that he had purchased the rights to all 16 books of the series. He explained that he had been "handcuffed" to the first two books in the series and will now be able to finally tell the story with a plan for a series of 7 films covering the books in their entirety.

=== Casting and filming ===
All cast members from the previous film were recast. Sorbo replaces Nicolas Cage as Rayford Steele, while Greg Perrow, Sarah Fisher, Kathryn Kohut, and Charles Andrew Payne replace Chad Michael Murray, Cassi Thomson, Nicky Whelan, and Lance E. Nichols as Cameron "Buck" Williams, Chloe Steele, Hattie Durham, and Bruce Barnes, respectively. David LeReaney plays Chaim Rosenzweig, Sorbo's wife Sam Sorbo plays Amanda White, and Linda Kee plays Ivy Gold, a character who is not from the books, having first appeared in the original Left Behind film played by Krista Bridges. Sorbo revealed that he was initially approached seven years ago to replace Cage for the role, but came onboard when it was time to go into production as he felt that "it just seems like the time is right".

Principal photography took place in Calgary, Alberta for 19 days in late fall 2021.

== Release ==
Left Behind: Rise of the Antichrist was scheduled to be released in October 2022, but was pushed back. It was released from January 26 to January 29, 2023 in partnership with Fathom Events. The film was distributed worldwide by 101 Films International.

The film surpassed $3 million at the box office in Canada and the United States. It was released on Blu-ray and DVD on March 21, 2023. The film was released in Brazil a month later on April 27, debuting in number five on the box office charts.

== Reception ==
Michael Foust writing for the Christian website Crosswalk.com gave the film an entertainment rating of 3 out of 5, stating that the film is "one-third a thriller film, one-third an apologetics lesson, and one-third a sermon", ultimately concluding that "Rise of the Antichrist is the best Left Behind movie yet, even if it does include one or two moments of 'cheese' that briefly distract from the plot."

Chris Willman of Variety states that while "the latest installment in the rapture franchise provides efficient filmmaking at times", in the end it "doesn't offer much movie rapture on the way to an altar-call epilogue."
