= Janaya Stephens =

Canadian film actress

- Years active: 1999–present

Janaya Stephens is a Canadian film actress prominently featured in the Left Behind series of films as Chloe Steele. She appeared on the TV series Flashpoint, playing the character Sophie Lane.

Stephens was born in London, Ontario. In high school at Strathroy District Collegiate Institute, Stephens excelled at basketball and soccer. After graduating, she went on to play varsity basketball at Laurentian University for the Laurentian Lady Vee's while studying English and Drama. While at Laurentian, she starred as Juliet in the school's production of Romeo & Juliet. Later she went on to study at George Brown Theatre School in Toronto.

Janaya has appeared in the television shows Twice in a Lifetime, Relic Hunter, and Sue Thomas: F.B.Eye. A notable movie role Janaya played was the lead part of Marie Osmond in the 2001 ABC original television movie Inside the Osmonds. It was rebroadcast four years later on VH1. One of her more recent films was the 2008 film Death Race where she played opposite Jason Statham.

== Filmography ==
=== Film ===
Year	Title	Role	Notes
2000	Left Behind: The Movie	Chloe Steele	
2000	Cruel Intentions 2	Cab Driver	Direct to video
2002	Left Behind II: Tribulation Force	Chloe Steele	
2005	Left Behind: World at War	Chloe Steele	
2007	The Lookout	Alison Pratt	
2008	Death Race	Suzy	
2014	Siren	Sarah	Short film
2019	Strange But True	Pilla	

=== Television ===
Year	Title	Role	Notes
1999–2000	Twice in a Lifetime	Mrs. John Paul O'Brien / Young Kat Lopez	Episode: "Sixteen Candles" (as Mrs. John Paul O'Brien); Episode: "Expose" (as Kat Lopez)
2000	Lexx	Peach	Episode: "Boomtown"
2000	Relic Hunter	Barmaid	Episode: "Irish Crown Affair"
2001	Exhibit A: Secrets of Forensic Science	Sandra McLean	Episode: "Away"
2001	Inside the Osmonds	Marie Osmond (older)	Television film
2001	Leap Years	Chloe	Episode: "1.6"; Episode: "1.7"
2002	Relic Hunter	Hippolyte	Episode: "Antianeirai"
2003	Blessings	Young Lydia Blessing	Television film
2004	Celeste in the City	Lauren Rawley-Simms	Television film
2004	Mutant X	Diane Taylor	Episode: "Cirque des Merveilles"
2004	Suburban Madness	Cassie Bascha	Television film
2004	While I Was Gone	Cass Beckett	Television film
2004	Sue Thomas: F.B.Eye	Dodger	2 episodes
2004	Category 6: Day of Destruction	Laura Harkin	Television film
2005	Missing	Amanda Keener / Elizabeth Harrington	Episode: "Paper Anniversary"
2005	Kevin Hill	Alison	6 episodes
2005	Beach Girls	Francesca Dellio	Television film
2005	The Hunt for the BTK Killer	Mom with Baby	Television film
2005	Category 7: The End of the World	Mary Beth Davis	Television film
2006	Beautiful People	Ms. Newburg	4 episodes
2008-2012	Flashpoint	Sophie Lane	16 episodes
2010	You Lucky Dog	Katie	Television film
2014	Hemlock Grove	Michelle	Episode: "Lost Generation"
2015	Saving Hope	Shona	Episode: "Shine a Light"
2017	Designated Survivor	Reporter	Episode: "One Hundred Days"
