= Left Behind: The Movie =

Left Behind
- Theatrical release poster
- Directed by: Vic Sarin
- Written by: Joe Goodman; Paul Lalonde; Alan B. McElroy
- Based on: Left Behind by Tim LaHaye; Jerry B. Jenkins
- Produced by: Joe Goodman; Paul Lalonde; Peter Lalonde; Ralph Winter
- Starring: Kirk Cameron; Brad Johnson; Gordon Currie; Janaya Stephens; Clarence Gilyard, Jr.; Chelsea Noble; Colin Fox
- Cinematography: George Tirl
- Edited by: Michael Pacek
- Music by: James Covell
- Production companies: Namesake Entertainment; Cloud Ten Pictures
- Distributed by: Cloud Ten Pictures
- Release dates: October 31, 2000 (video premiere); February 2, 2001 (U.S. theatrical)
- Running time: 100 minutes
- Countries: Canada; United States
- Language: English
- Budget: $17.4 million
- Box office: $4.2 million

Left Behind: The Movie (billed on-screen as Left Behind) is a 2000 Christian apocalyptic thriller film, based on the novel of the same name by Tim LaHaye and Jerry B. Jenkins. It is directed by Vic Sarin and stars Kirk Cameron, Brad Johnson, Chelsea Noble, Janaya Stephens, Gordon Currie, and Clarence Gilyard.

The film was released first direct-to-video on October 31, 2000, followed by a theatrical release in February 2001. The film received generally negative reviews. Despite this, the film managed to spawn two additional sequels based on the second novel in the series, Tribulation Force and World at War.

== Plot ==
GNN television journalist Cameron "Buck" Williams reports from Israel about a new technology which will allow food to grow in inhospitable environments. He interviews Israeli scientist Chaim Rosenzweig, and praises him for creating a miracle. Suddenly, Arab and Russian fighter jets fly overhead in a surprise air raid. A missile hits near Buck and Chaim as they retreat to a military bunker. The sun disappears even though it is still mid-day. The Israeli military is unable to counterattack, but the attacking jets start spontaneously exploding and crashing down. Buck runs outside with the news camera and records the drama as some GNN executives and reporters watch back in Chicago. The entire attacking force is destroyed.

The story shifts to pilot Rayford Steele, who has been asked to fly from New York City to London at short notice, causing him to miss his son Raymie's birthday party. Despite his wife's and his daughter's protests, he agrees and leaves his family behind. Rayford's daughter, Chloe Steele, is leaving for her college exams. Buck, having decided to go to London for an investigation of the attack, boards Rayford's plane.

On the flight, a flight attendant, Hattie Durham, who is having an affair with Rayford, reveals she's taking a job at the UN and this is her last flight. Later during the flight, some passengers awaken to realize that several of their fellow passengers are missing. Panic sets in, and Buck helps Hattie try to keep the passengers calm. Upon returning to the cockpit, they discover that people (later revealed to be Christians) are mysteriously disappearing worldwide and some planes are down from missing flight crews. He is forced to turn the plane back and land in Chicago. Shortly after landing, Buck locates Rayford and asks him to fly him to New York City. Rayford refuses, saying that he has to be with his family, but says he will find Buck a private pilot, and they both drive to Rayford's home.

Meanwhile, Chloe is driving home from her college exams when she encounters a large traffic accident. She goes to check on a crashed semi, whose driver vanished. People are reporting abandoned cars and children missing from their seats. While Chloe is inspecting the carnage, her car is stolen by a hurt man and she is stranded on the wrecked highway. She eventually starts walking down the highway. Rayford discovers that his wife and son are missing. He and Buck are forced to stay in the house because of a military-enforced curfew. Rayford starts to read his wife's Bible.

Chloe returns home, reunites with her father and discovers Buck sleeping on the couch. After conversing about her missing family, Chloe drives Buck to the airport and goes to look for her younger brother. Buck takes a plane to New York with pilot Ken Ritz. Rayford finds Chloe in an elementary school. He suggests they search the church because that is where his wife and son were most happy. Chloe refuses to go to church, saying that her mother was happiest when Ray was home. After Chloe returns home, Rayford goes to New Hope Village Church and finds Pastor Bruce Barnes. Bruce has also been left behind because he never truly believed in God. A believer at last, he begs for forgiveness and asks God for a second chance to help people. Rayford enters the church and kneels next to Bruce, telling him that God already has used him. They then watch a videotape left by another Reverend Billings dealing with the Rapture, in which all true believers are taken to Heaven, while the rest are left behind to endure the Tribulation—seven years of war and suffering.

When Buck gets to New York City, he finds that his friend Dirk Burton has been killed. While he is there, he takes a computer disc and is almost shot by a sniper. Buck decodes the computer disc and finds out that someone is trying to bankrupt the UN in order to control the world's food supply. Rayford confronts Hattie, telling her that their "affair" was wrong, and that he wants her forgiveness, and she leaves in a huff. Rayford tells Chloe about God and she says she believes. Meanwhile, Buck flies back to Chicago to meet with an old friend, CIA agent Alan Thompkins, who informs him that the agency is in disarray. After the meeting, Alan is killed in the process of a car bombing, which Buck narrowly escapes. He goes to Rayford's house, because they are the only ones Buck knows in Chicago. Taking the wounded Buck to New Hope Church (as a makeshift hospital), Rayford and Bruce show Buck the tape that Reverend Billings made. Buck, however, does not fully believe the claims, and he goes to warn Chaim about the plot against the UN. Rayford and Chloe attempt to stop him, because he doesn't have God on his side. Buck ignores the Steeles' advice and goes to the UN anyway.

At the UN, Buck sees the plans for a new Jewish temple and realizes that everything Rayford, Chloe and Bruce told him was true. Before the meeting, Buck finally accepts God and asks him to show him the way. God shows him that UN Secretary-General Nicolae Carpathia is the Antichrist when he reveals his plan for world domination, of which his plan to rebuild the temple of Israel is a logical first step. Carpathia shoots Jonathan Stonagal and Joshua Todd-Cothran, the corrupt bankers who were behind the plot to bankrupt the UN, and then brainwashes the new "kings and queens" (the 10 UN delegates) into thinking that Stonagal shot Cothran and himself. Everyone, even the press, believes Carpathia, except Buck, who leaves and returns to the church, where he resolves to fight Carpathia with the help of his friends. Narrating, Buck says the "seven years of peace" declared by Nicolae will be the seven worst years mankind has ever seen, and that faith is all they need.

== Cast ==
- Kirk Cameron as Buck Williams
- Brad Johnson as Rayford Steele
- Gordon Currie as Nicolae Carpathia
- Janaya Stephens as Chloe Steele
- Clarence Gilyard, Jr. as Bruce Barnes
- Chelsea Noble as Hattie Durham
- Colin Fox as Chaim Rosenzweig
- Daniel Pilon as Jonathan Stonagal
- Tony DeSantis as Joshua Todd-Cothran
- Jack Langedijk as Dirk Burton
- Krista Bridges as Ivy Gold
- Thomas Hauff as Steve Plank
- Neil Crone as Ken Ritz
- Philip Akin as Alan Tompkins
- T.D. Jakes as Pastor Vernon Billings
- Christie MacFadyen as Irene Steele
- Jay Manchester as Raymie Steele
- Sten Eirik as Carl
- Raven Dauda as Gloria
- Marvin Ishmael as Fitzhugh
- David Macniven as Chris Smith

== Production ==
=== Development ===
The film rights to Tim LaHaye and Jerry B. Jenkins' novel were optioned in 1999 by Namesake Entertainment, an independent production company specializing in adaptations of works by Christian authors, including a series of Ted Dekker adaptations. Veteran producer Ralph Winter was brought aboard to produce, and hired Alan B. McElroy to write the screenplay.

Unable to generate enough interest by studios, Winter licensed his portion of the rights to the Toronto-based writer-producers Peter and Paul Lalonde's Cloud Ten Pictures, who had previously made a similarly-themed series of direct-to-video films called the Apocalypse series. Winter and McElroy were not subsequently involved in the production, though Namesake retained a co-production credit on the first sequel Tribulation Force.

=== Casting ===
Before Janaya Stephens took the role of Chloe Steele, it had been given to Lacey Chabert, who dropped out due to scheduling conflicts.

Televangelists Jack Van Impe and John Hagee make cameo appearances as raptured airline passengers, evangelist T. D. Jakes has a role as Pastor Vernon Billings. Contemporary Christian music artists Bob Carlisle and Rebecca St. James appear as news anchors, and members of the Christian band Jake appeared as police guards towards the end of the movie.

=== Filming ===
Left Behind was shot primarily in and around Toronto, Ontario, Canada. The film cost $17.4 million (equivalent to $29,948,428 in 2025). At the time of its release, the film was promoted by its creators as the "biggest and most ambitious Christian film ever made." Filming commenced in early May 2000 and continued for a total of 31 days.

An Ontario quarry was used for the scenes of Israel. Bowmanville Zoo's Mike Hackenberger commented, "Camels sell the look. ... As a prop, camels are great. You can move 'em around, you can stick 'em there, and you see a camel on sand, you know it's desert ... They might not fit through the eye of the needle, but without them, this movie would have been a disaster. There should be at least one camel in every movie."

== Soundtrack ==
Two CDs of music from the film have been released.

On October 3, 2000, Reunion Records released Left Behind: The Movie Soundtrack, featuring a collection of songs from and inspired by the film.

1. Left Behind (Main Theme) – Bryan Duncan and SHINEmk
2. Never Been Unloved (Bruce's Song) – Michael W. Smith
3. I Believe in You – Joy Williams
4. Sky Falls Down (Israel Is Attacked) – Third Day
5. I Need a Miracle – Plus One
6. Hide My Soul – Avalon
7. Can´t Wait for You to Return – Fred Hammond
8. Midnight Cry (Closing Theme) – Various Artists
9. Fly (Chloe's Song) – LaRue
10. Believer (Buck's Song) – Jake
11. Come Quickly Lord – Rebecca St. James
12. After All (Rayford's Song) – Bob Carlisle
13. Live for the Lord (Irene's Song) – Kathy Troccoli
14. All the Way to Heaven – V*Enna
15. No Fear (Panic in the City) – Clay Crosse

On February 6, 2001, Reunion released the second CD, titled Left Behind: The Original Motion Picture Score. The CD featured the orchestral score composed by James Covell, and performed by the London Symphony Orchestra and the Lake Avenue Choir. The CD includes these seventeen tracks:

1. Prologue
2. Left Behind Main Title
3. Surprise Attack
4. Rayford's Conversion
5. Dirk's in Trouble
6. Rebuild the Temple
7. Rapture
8. Rayford Comes Home
9. Loss of a Friend
10. Buck's Mission
11. Chloe's Choice
12. One Left, the Other Taken
13. Goodbyes
14. I Don't Want to Lose You
15. Prayers for Buck
16. Seven Years
17. The Final Chapter

== Release ==
=== Home media ===
Three-and-a-half million copies of the film were sold. In a rare tactic, Left Behind was released on DVD first. According to the filmmakers, this was to build interest. The first DVD, released on October 31, 2000, featured coupons for the upcoming theatrical release, allowing those going to see it to get in for the price of a matinee ticket.

The film saw a theatrical release on February 2, 2001.

=== Box office ===
The film opened 17th in the nation over the February 2–4 weekend, making $2,158,780. The film went on to gross a total of $4,224,065, barely surpassing its budget.

=== Critical reception ===
The film has a 16% rating on Rotten Tomatoes based on 45 reviews with an average rating of 3.4/10 and a critical consensus of "Poor production values, slow pacing, and an implausible story makes Left Behind a movie only for the faithful". Metacritic, which uses a weighted average, assigned the film a score of 22 out of 100, based on 12 critics, indicating "generally unfavorable" reviews. The Washington Post's Desson Howe described it as "a blundering cringefest, thanks to unintentionally laughable dialogue, hackneyed writing and uninspired direction. The more this movie tries, the worse it gets. Its sincerity ends up becoming a bulging bull's-eye for rotten-tomato throwers."

== Legal dispute ==
Owing to dissatisfaction with the quality of the film and its sequels, LaHaye filed suit against Namesake Entertainment and Cloud Ten Pictures in July 1999, claiming breach of contract. On July 3, 2008, Tim LaHaye and Cloud Ten settled legal disputes on the film adaptations of the book series. Part of the agreement grants LaHaye an opportunity to remake the series. He asserts:

My dream has always been to enter the movie theater with a first-class, high-quality movie that is grippingly interesting, but also is true to the biblical storyline -- and that was diluted in the first attempt. But Lord willing, we are going to see this thing made into the movie that it should be, and that all the world sees it before the real Rapture comes.

As of October 1, 2010, the rights to the Left Behind film series were reclaimed by Cloud Ten Pictures. The series was rebooted with a 2014 film, which was approved by LaHaye, and which has also been poorly received.

== Sequels ==
Left Behind was followed by two direct sequels:

- Left Behind II: Tribulation Force (2002) - An adaptation of the sequel novel Tribulation Force
- Left Behind: World at War (2005) - A partial adaptation of the last 50 pages of Tribulation Force, and the third novel Nicolae.

== Works cited ==
- Melnyk, George (2004). One Hundred Years of Canadian Cinema. University of Toronto Press. ISBN 080203568X.
