= The Indwelling =

2000 novel by Tim LaHaye and Jerry B. Jenkins

The Indwelling: The Beast Takes Possession
- The Indwelling paperback cover
- Author: Tim LaHaye and Jerry B. Jenkins
- Cover artist: Julie Chen
- Language: English
- Series: Left Behind Series
- Genre: Christian novel Speculative Fiction; Post-apocalyptic fiction
- Publisher: Tyndale House Publishers
- Publication date: May 2000 Hardcover & Jan 2001 Paperback
- Publication place: United States
- Media type: Print (Hardback & Paperback) also Audiobook
- Pages: 389 pages (hardcover and paperback editions)
- ISBN: 0-8423-2928-5 (hardback edition) & ISBN 0-8423-2929-3 (paperback edition)
- OCLC: 183443870
- Dewey Decimal: 813/.54 21
- LC Class: PS3562.A315 I54 2000
- Preceded by: Assassins
- Followed by: The Mark

The Indwelling: The Beast Takes Possession is the seventh book in the Left Behind series by Tim LaHaye and Jerry B. Jenkins, published in May 2000. It was on The New York Times Best Seller list for 35 weeks. It takes place 42 months into the Tribulation and at the end of the novel 3 days into the Great Tribulation.

== Plot introduction ==
The book begins soon after Nicolae Carpathia is assassinated, and tells more on the end of the Gala, the midpoint of the Tribulation and the opening of the Great Tribulation.

== Plot summary ==
People flee from the scene of the assassination in a panic. Buck Williams notices that the gunshot sounded similar to the sound of the gun Nicolae used to kill Eli and Moishe. Rayford Steele is still wondering whether he really was the one that scripture singled out to deliver the killing blow to the Antichrist Nicolae Carpathia. In fact, it was Chaim Rosenzweig who stabbed Nicolae through the back of the head with a knife that he created- the thinnest, sharpest knife ever, although other suspects include Rayford, one of the sub-potentates, and even Hattie Durham. Leah Rose attempts to free Hattie from BFFR, meeting fellow believer and Global Community (GC) mole Ming Toy. Hattie was let go from BFFR and tracked by the GC, who expect her to lead them to the Tribulation Force safe house. She does not go to the safe house, as the GC wants her to, but goes AWOL.

Buck Williams is frantically searching for Chaim, believing that he has had a stroke, or worse, a heart attack. He returns to Chaim's manor to find several of Chaim's friends murdered by GC. Rayford escapes to Greece, worried that the GC may be pursuing him. He takes refuge with Lukas "Laslos" Miklos and his pastor. After being filled with rage for the past several months, resulting in his attempted killing of Carpathia, Rayford is guilty over his selfishness and vows never to allow his emotions to rule him again, and continues on his way back to Mount Prospect. Leah has already returned to the States but needs a ride. Meanwhile, Buck and Chaim make an escape from Israel, ending in a plane crash that results in Chaim's acceptance of Christ, as well as the death of T. M. Delanty.

Meanwhile, at the safe house, Chloe is in despair and has developed a plan to kill her son Kenny and then herself should they ever be found out by the GC, since she cannot bear to live without him. She is gently rebuked by Tsion. David Hassid informs them of danger and of a possible new safe house in Chicago (which the GC thinks is radiation-contaminated), the Strong Building, a huge skyscraper. Impulsively, Chloe goes to investigate it and leaves Kenny with Tsion, while Rayford and Leah return to Chicago.

At the safe house, Tsion Ben-Judah experiences a series of dreams given to him by God Himself. He witnesses a brief glimpse of the cosmic war in heaven that is slowly spilling into the Earth. He also receives a glimpse of the future, God's deliverance of His people- the Jews- into a safe haven, an act in which the Tribulation Force will soon play a vital role. He awakens to find that the safe house has been compromised. Rayford Steele, with the aid of new believer Al B, helps Tsion and toddler Kenny Bruce Williams escape the GC.

David Hassid coordinates purchases for the building of a statue of Carpathia done by flamboyant Guy Blod. He also is drawn closer into the circle of Leon Fortunato, who expects to be the new potentate. Leon shows him footage of the assassination and David listens in on the preparation of Carpathia's body by mortician Dr. Eikenberry. She discovers Chaims's blade and becomes part of the cover-up, lying and saying that she found a gunshot wound instead. Rayford becomes the scapegoat, since he is an easier person to blame than giving the truth that someone on the platform murdered Carpathia.

As the world mourns the death of their leader and a funeral service is set for three days later after the assassination, the statue of Nicolae is erected. Millions gather to view Carpathia's body, encased by bulletproof glass. Suddenly, the statue comes to life in the midst of black billowing smoke and speaks, demanding worship. Leon Fortunato, who is here revealed as the False Prophet, calls down lightning and fire from heaven to kill those who do not worship the image. David and his new fiancée Annie Christopher (who works in the palace and is also a believer) are stationed in different areas as they watch the resulting chaos. David sits with the Wong family (Ming Toy, her parents, and her younger brother, Chang, a believer and computer prodigy). In full view of the crowd, Carpathia is resurrected, possessed by Satan on the first day of the Great Tribulation. David is frantic because Annie is missing. The Antichrist speaks to the people of the world, declaring that if anyone is able to doubt that he is God after seeing this, and if there are still people who think that they have already been enduring Tribulation, then they should prepare for the Great Tribulation.

== Characters ==
- Rayford Steele
- Cameron "Buck" Williams
- Chloe Steele Williams
- Dr. Tsion Ben-Judah
- David Hassid
- Annie Christopher
- Mac McCullum
- Supreme Potentate Nicolae Carpathia
- Supreme Commander Leon Fortunato
- Dr. Chaim Rosenzweig
- Hattie Durham
- Leah Rose
- Tyrola "T" Mark Delanty, owner of Palwaukee Airport
- Kenny Bruce Williams
- Al B.
- Mr. and Mrs. (Lukas) Laslos Niklos
- Ming Toy
- Minster Guy Blod
