= The Mark (novel) =

Eighth book in the Left Behind series

The Mark: The Beast Rules The World
- The Hardback Cover
- Author: Tim LaHaye and Jerry B. Jenkins
- Cover artist: Julie Chen
- Language: English
- Series: Left Behind Series
- Genre: Christian novel Speculative Fiction; Post-apocalyptic fiction
- Publisher: Tyndale House Publishers
- Publication date: November 2000 (Hardback); August 2001 (Paperback)
- Publication place: United States
- Media type: Print (Hardback, Paperback, Audiobook)
- Pages: 400 pages (hardcover); 380 pages (paperback)
- ISBN: 0-8423-3225-1 (hardback edition); ISBN 0-8423-3228-6(paperback edition)
- OCLC: 183443889
- Dewey Decimal: 813/.54 21
- LC Class: PS3562.A315 M3 2000
- Preceded by: The Indwelling
- Followed by: Desecration

The Mark: The Beast Rules the World is the eighth book in the Left Behind series. It was published in November 2000 by Tyndale House. It was on The New York Times Best Seller list for 32 weeks. It takes place 42 months into the Tribulation and 3–25 days into the Great Tribulation.

== Plot summary ==
His Excellency Global Community Potentate Nicolae Carpathia has been resurrected and indwelt by Satan himself. He plans to remodel his offices and add two floors to his palace, including a glass ceiling. He also demands that the people of the Global Community (GC) worship him. Statues of himself are erected for worship. He introduces Viv Ivins to the senior staff and tells them of the loyalty mark program. The Antichrist declares that every single person on earth must receive his mark of loyalty and worship his image or lose their head to the loyalty enforcement facilitator. David Hassid finally finds out that his fiancée Annie Christopher has been killed by lightning called down by GC Supreme Commander and False Prophet Leon Fortunato. David passes out in the heat after the "funeral" while looking for Annie. He awakes to find himself tended by Hannah Palemoon, a nurse and a believer. She is added to their ranks and helps to plan their escape before the mark.

Albie and Rayford Steele run across Steve Plank, under the alias Pinkerton Stephens, at Boulder, CO, where Hattie has been taken. Steve tells them his conversion story; he became a believer during the Wrath of the Lamb Earthquake, surviving but losing much of his body. He now wears prosthetic body parts and uses a wheelchair. The three then carry out the incredible rescue of Hattie Durham, who finally becomes a believer. Before they rescue her, she tries to hang herself in her room.

Terror comes to Christians in Greece as they are among the first to receive the death penalty for refusing the mark. Lukas Miklos loses his wife, his pastor, his pastor's wife and dozens of fellow Greek believers to the guillotine, while Cameron "Buck" Williams, who is in Greece in disguise along with Albie, help two Greek teenagers escape the detention center. Meanwhile, back in the states, Gustaf Zuckermandel, Jr. also known as Zeke, is distraught to find out that his father, whom everyone calls "Big Zeke", has suffered the same fate after being caught helping and supplying other believers (subversives, according to the GC).

In New Babylon, David Hassid, Mac McCullum, Abdullah Smith, and Hannah Palemoon plan to leave, taking Ming Toy's 17-year-old brother Chang Wong (who is also a believer) along with them. But Chang, a computer prodigy, was brought by his parents to New Babylon, hoping to get him hired in Carpathia's forces. Determined to "make proud", Mr. Wong has Chang drugged, carried to the mark application site, and held down, even as he protests. But even after being given the mark of the beast against his will, Chang still has the mark of the believer clearly visible because he never accepted the mark of the beast by heart, spirit, and will. In this, David and Chang discover a great advantage: Chang can now be the new Tribulation Force mole in the GC Headquarters Palace as he can come, go, and trade freely. Meanwhile, the others plan a plane crash to deceive the GC into thinking they're dead while they join up with the Tribulation force to get ready for the massive exodus for believers which they call "Operation Eagle", calling in all their favors from the International Commodity Co-Op.

Everything reaches a climax when Carpathia announces that he will be returning to Jerusalem less than a month after his death there to occupy what he believes is his rightful house: the Jewish Temple.

== Region codes ==
Each of the ten regions (prophesied in the Bible [Daniel 7:20]) in the Global Community, the Antichrist-headed world government, is given a code that is also used when the Mark of the Beast is applied to Global Community loyalists. Each number is obtained from a mathematical expression involving three sixes, the number of the beast. (Example: a citizen from the United Carpathian States would receive a 216 on his or her right hand or forehead).

- United North American States: 6-6-6 = -6
- United South American States: (6-6)x6 = 0
- United Great Britain States: (6+6)/6 = 2
- United European States: 6+6-6 = 6
- United African States: (6/6)+6 = 7
- United Pacific States: 6+6+6 = 18
- United Asian States: (6x6)-6 = 30
- United Indian States: (6x6)+6 = 42
- United Russian States: (6+6)x6 = 72
- United Carpathian (Holy Land) States: 6x6x6 = 216

== Characters ==
- Rayford Steele
- Cameron "Buck" Williams
- Chloe Steele Williams
- Dr. Tsion Ben-Judah
- David Hassid
- Annie Christopher
- Mac McCullum
- His Excellency Global Community Potentate Nicolae Carpathia
- Most High Reverend Father of Carpathianism Leon Fortunato
- Dr. Chaim Rosenzweig
- Hattie Durham
- Leah Rose
- Kenny Bruce Williams
- Laslos Miklos
- Mrs. Miklos
- Ming Toy
- Chang Wong
- Minister Guy Blod
- Al B (a.k.a. Albie)
- Abdullah Smith (a.k.a. Smitty)
- Walter Moon
- Supreme Commander James Hickman
- Viv Ivins
- Hannah Palemoon
- Pinkerton Stephens, a.k.a. Steve Plank
