= Glenn Shuck =

American evangelical academic

Glenn W. Shuck was an assistant professor in the Religion Department at Williams College in Williamstown, Massachusetts. He received his Ph.D. from Rice University, and is best known as a scholar of North American evangelicalism.

His book Marks of the Beast: The Left Behind Novels and the Struggle for Evangelical Identity, was published by NYU Press in 2005. He followed this with a collection of original essays co-edited with Jeffrey J. Kripal of Rice University on the Esalen Institute in California, published by Indiana University Press in 2005. Shuck's scholarship and teaching also focuses on New Religious Movements in the United States as well as the Protestant Reformation and contemporary trends in religion and politics and apocalypticism and millennial movements. His current work focuses on the roots and consequences of American cultural pessimism, with a book co-written with John M. Stroup in fall 2007 from Baylor University Press. His publishing and pedagogy is also heavily influenced by insights provided by American Continental philosophers, especially Mark C. Taylor of Williams College and Edith Wyschogrod of Rice University. He received his B.A. from Texas Lutheran University in German Studies, and maintains an active interest in German theology and politics, and has published an article in German in the theological periodical Zeitzeichen titled "Trojanisches Pferd im Kulturkampf: Die apocalyptischen Left Behind-Romane sind Teil eines evangelikalen Kulturkampfes".
