= Left Behind: World at War =

- DVD cover
- Directed by: Craig R. Baxley
- Screenplay by: Paul Lalonde; Peter Lalonde; André van Heerden
- Based on: Left Behind by Tim LaHaye and Jerry B. Jenkins
- Produced by: Nicholas Tarbarrok; André van Heerden
- Starring: Louis Gossett Jr.; Kirk Cameron; Gordon Currie; Brad Johnson
- Cinematography: David Connell
- Edited by: Sonny Baskin
- Music by: Gary Chang
- Production companies: Sony Pictures Home Entertainment; Cloud Ten Pictures
- Distributed by: Sony Pictures Home Entertainment
- Release date: October 21, 2005
- Running time: 95 minutes
- Country: United States
- Language: English

Left Behind: World at War is a 2005 American Christian thriller film and the third in the series of films based on the Left Behind book series. It was directed by Craig R. Baxley and produced by Cloud Ten Pictures. The film premiered in churches on October 21, 2005, before its release on DVD and VHS on October 25, 2005. It was based primarily on the last fifty pages of the 1996 novel Tribulation Force and is currently the last film in the Left Behind film series, as a new adaption of the first book was made and released on October 3, 2014. The film ends with a cliffhanger that is never resolved as the producers decided not make a fourth installment.

== Plot ==
Eighteen months after the events of the previous film, the world has fallen into chaos. In the collapsing ruins of the White House, U.S. President Gerald Fitzhugh (Louis Gossett Jr.) videotapes a confession. He looks out the window as a shadowy figure arrives in the doorway.

One week earlier, the Tribulation Force, consisting of Rayford Steele (Brad Johnson), his daughter Chloe (Janaya Stephens), Buck Williams (Kirk Cameron), Bruce Barnes (Arnold Pinnock), and Chris Smith are in the process of stealing Bibles from a Global Community (GC) compound. Guards burst into the warehouse and are handily defeated by Chris (using kung fu) while the remaining Trib Force members escape. In Washington, D.C., the President and his Vice-President, John Mallory (Charles Martin Smith), are taking some time away from the White House. Mallory informs Fitzhugh of Nicolae's plans and how he has found evidence that Nicolae is planning a biological attack on American soil. Before he can share the information, Mallory is killed in an ambush, but a militia group comes to the aid of the President.

Back at the Trib Force underground headquarters, Bruce Barnes performs a double wedding ceremony: Buck to Chloe, and Rayford to Amanda White, the newest member who once knew Rayford's first wife before the vanishings. After the ceremony is over, Buck heads over to Los Angeles and Rayford flies to New Babylon. Nicolae meets with Fitzhugh who expresses his deepest concern over the news of Mallory's death, and teams up with Carolyn Miller, who poses as Nicolae's top aide at GC headquarters. Together, they find Nicolae's secret plan of stealing Bibles and lacing them with anthrax before distributing them. The GC block their escape, and Fitzhugh kills one of the guards in the process.

Fitzhugh is recruited by Miller's ragtag military team to help take out Nicolae, which he participates in. He also learns that the British and Egyptian governments are working with the militia. Fitzhugh enters the GC building and asks to see the President (it is also revealed that one of the GC guards is really an insider, but is shot by another). Fitzhugh enters Nicolae's office, but Nicolae is already aware of Fitzhugh's assassination attempt and foils it. Fitzhugh tries to shoot Nicolae with three rounds, but he is not affected as they go through him and hit a guard instead. Using supernatural techniques, Nicolae throws Fitzhugh out of a 20-story window, landing on top of a car. Nicolae goes over to the window to see, in disgust, Fitzhugh getting up and walking away. Fitzhugh is not believed when he returns to the militia base to inform that the plan failed: Carolyn takes this the hardest.

The underground Trib Force HQ is hit the hardest as World War III approaches. Bruce and Chloe are infected with the virulent bacteria, but in the end, it is Chloe who miraculously survives when red wine, used in the communion they just took part of, is revealed to be the antidote. Buck meets Fitzhugh in a destroyed White House, where he helps the President become a Christian. Fitzhugh then confronts Nicolae in a final showdown where he activates a personal transmitter (and dials Carolyn's cell phone, where she hears the entire conversation), hoping to obliterate the entire GC headquarters, and himself, with a missile locked onto the transmitter's location. Fitzhugh dies in the resulting explosion, wiping out the GC base.

Buck Williams gets a call in the elevator from Chloe as she tells him about the wine and Bruce's death. Buck promises to come home from his trip soon as the elevator stops and the door opens to reveal an armed Carolyn. She lowers her weapon and Buck states that they need to talk, implying that they had met before. What is left of the Global Community Building burns down, police sirens wail in the background, and explosions are still going on. Nicolae Carpathia walks out from the flames looking very angry, completely unharmed.

== Cast ==
- Louis Gossett Jr. as President Gerald Fitzhugh
- Kirk Cameron as Buck Williams
- Brad Johnson as Rayford Steele
- Jessica Steen as Carolyn Miller
- Gordon Currie as Nicolae Carpathia
- Janaya Stephens as Chloe Steele
- Chelsea Noble as Hattie Durham
- Laura Catalano as Amanda White
- Arnold Pinnock as Bruce Barnes
- Charles Martin Smith as Vice President John Mallory
- David Eisner as Chief of Staff Allan Campbell
- Richard Fitzpatrick as Major Kent

== Production ==
Filming took place in Toronto, Ontario. Clarence Gilyard Jr. was originally signed to reprise his role of Bruce Barnes but could not return due to a scheduling conflict. As a devout Catholic he has also said his priest was happy he did not reprise the role, as the films portray a premillennial rapturist theology that is in opposition to the Catholic Church's amillennial teachings.

== Differences from the novel ==
The final two chapters of the book Tribulation Force and the first four or five chapters of Nicolae have events that match up to what is shown in World at War. Recognizable events were the marriages of Buck with Chloe and Rayford with Amanda, the death of Bruce Barnes, and the U.S. President heading an attack with Britain and Egypt, against the Global Community.

Major parts of the movie, however, were not in any of the books: the poisoning of Bibles by the forces of Nicolae, and an attempt by Fitzhugh to assassinate Nicolae. Buck's meeting with the president in the books makes it into the movie, but in a totally different form. Also, in the movie Nicolae Carpathia, the main antagonist, is portrayed almost as a supernatural being, displaying supernatural powers against his enemies; this is most clearly shown at the end, where Carpathia walks out completely unharmed from the wreckage of a building that was literally blown into pieces.

== Reception ==
Todd Hertz from Christianity Today rated the film two out of four stars and said, "The mere existence of cheese in a Left Behind film comes as no surprise to some movie fans. However, excluding a few goofy moments, Left Behind: World at War plays out as an average TV drama. Many times, I caught myself thinking of it as 24—with less action and more prayer time. There's impressive acting, some intrigue, mostly decent special effects, and good themes for Christian discussion". Nathan Rabin of The Dissolve wrote that the film is too well-made to be campy enough for non-believers, but Christians should enjoy its better production values than the previous films in the series. Beyond Hollywood wrote, "Religion-themed films have never been known for action scenes, but World at War seems to be making a statement that good action in the genre is indeed possible." Scott Weinberg of DVD Talk wrote that "it's just as overstuffed with smug sermonizing as its predecessors". David Johnson of DVD Verdict wrote, "It's not great, but World at War is an all-around better effort than the other films."

A game based on the film was released by Inspired Media Entertainment (formerly Left Behind games).
