= Off the Mark (film) =

- Directed by: Bill Berry
- Written by: Bill Berry
- Produced by: Ira Trattner
- Starring: Mark Neely; Terry Farrell; Clarence Gilyard Jr. Norman Alden; Virginia Capers; Jon Cypher; Barry Corbin; Alexander Polinsky; Susan Luck; Darius Lawrence; Melanie Lasher; Kelly Meadows; Matthew Licht; Patrick Campbell
- Cinematography: Arledge Armenaki
- Edited by: Andres Markovits
- Music by: David Michael Frank
- Release date: November 1987
- Country: United States
- Language: English

Off the Mark, also known as Crazy Legs, is a 1987 American comedy film directed by Bill Berry and starring Mark Neely, Terry Farrell, Clarence Gilyard Jr., Norman Alden and Virginia Capers. The musical score was composed by David Michael Frank.

== Cast ==
- Mark Neely
- Terry Farrell
- Clarence Gilyard Jr.
- Norman Alden
- Virginia Capers
- Jon Cypher
- Barry Corbin
- Alexander Polinsky
- David D'Arnal
- Patrick Campbell
- Matthew Licht
- Kelly Meadows
- Melanie Lasher
- Darius Lawrence
- Susan Luck
- Michael Berryman as Acme Labs Man
- Billy Barty as The Little Russian
