= Tribulation Force =

1996 novel by Tim LaHaye and Jerry B. Jenkins

Tribulation Force: The Continuing Drama of Those Left Behind
- The Current Edition Paperback Cover
- Author: Tim LaHaye and Jerry B. Jenkins
- Cover artist: Chris Butler
- Language: English
- Series: Left Behind Series
- Genre: Christian; Speculative fiction Apocalyptic fiction
- Publisher: Tyndale House Publishers
- Publication date: October 1996
- Publication place: United States
- Media type: Print (Hardback & Paperback) also Graphic Novel
- Pages: 450 pages
- ISBN: 0-8423-2913-7 (hardcover), ISBN 0-8423-2921-8 (paperback)
- OCLC: 34958733
- Dewey Decimal: 813/.54 20
- LC Class: PS3562.A315 T75 1996
- Preceded by: Left Behind
- Followed by: Nicolae

Tribulation Force: The Continuing Drama of Those Left Behind (1996) is the second novel in the Left Behind series, by Tim LaHaye and Jerry B. Jenkins. It takes place from two weeks after the Rapture to 18 months into the Tribulation.

== Plot introduction ==
In a series of events that followed the Rapture, in which Jesus Christ takes away members of His church from Earth, some find themselves left behind. Eventually they meet at New Hope Village Church, located in the suburbs of Chicago. They then meet from time to time and become immersed in study of prophecies contained in the Bible. Their study reveals that the Antichrist will establish control of the Earth, and the Tribulation period lasting seven years will start after his covenant with Israel. Jesus Christ's second coming will fall on the end of the Tribulation.

In the course of their study, some characters in the novel form a core group which Chloe Steele christens the "Tribulation Force", dedicated to fight the seven years' war with the Antichrist.

== Plot summary ==
Rayford Steele, Chloe Steele, Buck Williams and Bruce Barnes find themselves left behind. This group of believers, as well as others left behind but becoming believers, are otherwise known as "Tribulation Saints", to differentiate from the pre-Rapture designation of Christian. The question of what to do in response to this radical change in situation arises. They propose to fight the perceived threat that Antichrist Nicolae Carpathia poses in the form of eradicating all religion and establishing a single world religion. The dogma consists of the notion that "there is no heaven nor hell, just [the left-behind]."

Upon being demoted at the end of the first novel, Buck moves to Chicago for his new job. He considers a relationship with Chloe Steele, debating whether or not it is worthwhile at this point in history. This leads to a misunderstanding which is eventually resolved. Buck is invited to visit Carpathia at the United Nations in New York City, where he is instituting radical changes. He tells Buck he is planning to buy all media and wants Buck to head one of the newspapers. Upon his new assistant's (Hattie Durham) recommendation, Carpathia also manipulates Rayford to become his head pilot, wanting only the best. Both Rayford and Buck are present for the signing of the treaty between the UN and Israel.

Nicolae twists the message of world-famous rabbi Tsion Ben-Judah about Messiah, in order to point to himself as thus. Buck flies to Jerusalem to meet Ben-Judah and present him to the two witnesses (described in Revelation) stationed at the United Nations-blockaded Wailing Wall. He converts to Christianity, believing that Jesus is the one and only Messiah; thus disproving Carpathia.

During the prophesied eighteen months of peace following the covenant with Israel, Chloe and Buck are married, along with Rayford and new believer Amanda White, a friend of Rayford's first wife Irene. However, both Buck, who becomes publisher of Global Community Weekly, formerly Global Weekly, and Rayford, who is handpicked to pilot Carpathia's jet, are in the distressing position of watching Carpathia, now Supreme Potentate of the U.N. - now reorganized into the Global Community- strengthen his grip on the world, witnessing how he orchestrates World War III to bring the former world powers under his heel and how he bamboozles Israeli botanist Chaim Rosenzweig into giving the GC his illustrious Eden formula for a GC-guaranteed peace treaty with Israel, thus initiating the Tribulation. As World War III breaks out, the Tribulation Force suffers its first casualty in the death of their pastor, Bruce Barnes, who was killed in a bombing in the now-decimated city of Chicago.

== Characters in Tribulation Force ==
- Rayford Steele – main character, Pan-Continental Airlines pilot and new head of the "Tribulation Force"
- Chloe Steele Williams – daughter to Rayford, wife to "Buck"
- Buck Williams – news reporter and confidant to Nicolae Carpathia
- Bruce Barnes – spiritual guide to the "Trib' Force", dies in this book
- Amanda White (Steele) – new wife to Rayford
- Tsion Ben-Judah – rabbinical scholar
- Chaim Rosenzweig – Israeli statesman and botanist, created the Eden formula
- Steve Plank – former executive editor of Global Weekly, now chief press secretary to Carpathia
- Hattie Durham – former senior flight attendant with Pan-Con and Rayford, personal secretary of and romantically involved with Carpathia
- Global Community Supreme Potentate Nicolae Carpathia
- Verna Zee, head of Chicago Global Weekly office
- Alice, receptionist at the Chicago Global Weekly office
- Nicholas "Nicky" Edwards, Pan-Con First Officer, later Captain
- Peter Cardinal Matthews, Archbishop of Cincinnati
- Earl Halliday, Pan-Con Pilot
- Marc Feinberg, rabbinical scholar
- Leonard Gustufson, President of Pan-Con
- Gerald Fitzhugh, President of the United States

== Major book themes ==
Christian prophetic themes are explored in a fictional context taking a particular position on such topics as the Second Coming, the Antichrist, the Tribulation, and the Millennium.

== Film adaptation ==
The story in this book has been adapted into two feature films in the same film franchise. The novel was adapted into Left Behind II: Tribulation Force and was produced by Cloud Ten Pictures. This second film in the Left Behind film series did not complete the entire story of the novel, so it was needed to make a third film based on the last few chapters of Tribulation Force, Cloud Ten Pictures did this with the third film in the Left Behind Series, Left Behind: World at War.
