= Armageddon (novel) =

2003 novel by Tim LaHaye and Jerry B. Jenkins

Armageddon: The Cosmic Battle of The Ages
- The Paperback Cover
- Author: Tim LaHaye and Jerry B. Jenkins
- Cover artist: Tim O'Brien
- Language: English
- Series: Left Behind Series
- Genre: Christian novel Speculative Fiction; Post-apocalyptic fiction
- Publisher: Tyndale House Publishers
- Publication date: April 2003 (Hardback); November 2003 (Paperback)
- Publication place: United States
- Media type: Print (hardback & paperback) also Audiobook
- Pages: 432 pages
- ISBN: 0-8423-3234-0 (hardback edition) & ISBN 0-8423-3236-7 (paperback edition)
- OCLC: 50919873
- Dewey Decimal: 813/.54 21
- LC Class: PS3562.A315 A76 2003
- Preceded by: The Remnant
- Followed by: Glorious Appearing

Armageddon: The Cosmic Battle of the Ages is the 11th novel in the Left Behind series by Tim LaHaye and Jerry Jenkins. It was first published in April 2003. It was on The New York Times Best Seller list for 20 weeks. It takes place 6–7 years into the Tribulation, 2 1/2 to 3 1/2 years into the Great Tribulation, and at the end of the novel the day of the Glorious Appearing.

== Plot summary ==
It is the beginning of the final year of the Tribulation, and New Babylon is covered in thick darkness with the fifth Bowl Judgment. Rayford Steele, Abdullah Smith, and Naomi Tiberias travel by jet to New Babylon to rescue Chang Wong, their undercover mole looking for a way out. While there, Rayford discovers a believer named Otto Weser, whose underground cell of believers were hiding out in New Babylon from Global Community forces. Rayford and Otto crash a meeting that Global Community Supreme Potentate Nicolae Carpathia holds in his office, telling his officials about the move to Al Hillah and the plan to build up troops in the Jezreel Valley for the final battle to deal with the Jews and believers in both Jerusalem and Petra. Rayford, Abdullah, Naomi, and Chang manage to escape, though Otto stays behind in New Babylon.

Meanwhile, Global Community troops are canvassing the area of the San Diego underground safehouse in which the members of the Tribulation Force are hiding out. Chloe Williams goes out to investigate one of their vehicles, but is soon pursued, captured, and brought into custody where she is interrogated for any knowledge she has concerning the Tribulation Force. With divine help, Chloe refuses to give them any information, even when she gets drugged and transported to an Illinois holding facility where she is injected with truth serum. Upon finding Chloe missing, Buck is absolutely frantic and short-tempered with others. The Tribulation Force try to find out where she was being taken, but are unable to rescue her before she is publicly executed. Before her transfer, Chloe is able to send a coded message to Rayford instructing him to quickly evacuate the safe house, as GC Troops know where it is located, and relocate to Petra. The San Diego believers are relocated to Petra, where they mourn not only for Chloe but also for Albie, who was killed by Mainyu Mazda when he tried to pay for his help in bugging the place where Nicolae's cabinet was going to meet.

Half a year later, Ming Toy and Ree Woo marry, and the Global Community cabinet now moves to Baghdad, to a special conference room that the Tribulation Force has secretly bugged in order to find out Carpathia's plans. During the meeting, Carpathia confesses that he is the Antichrist, and then with Leon Fortunato he causes three Carpathia clone bodies come to life by three froglike spirits that come out of their mouths. Their purpose is to gather up all the armies of the world to the Jezreel Valley (the Valley of Megiddo, or Armageddon) for the final battle. It is at this point that Tsion Ben-Judah decides to turn over the leadership at Petra to Chaim Rosenzweig in order to train himself as a soldier to defend Jerusalem from the Global Community forces.

At the final week of the Tribulation, God causes the Euphrates River to dry up, allowing the armies from the east to pass over and gather at the Jezreel Valley, fulfilling the sixth Bowl Judgment. The day before the Lord's second coming, Tsion travels to Jerusalem with Buck to fight with the Jews and to share the gospel with them so that they could be saved. An angel appears in New Babylon and calls believers to come out of her before she is destroyed. Mac McCullum travels to New Babylon with Lionel Whalum and delivers the remaining believers out prior to its destruction which they watch happen from the sky after rescuing believers from the city; New Babylon is utterly destroyed in one hour, similar to Sodom and Gomorrah. The battle finally commences on the day of the Lord's coming, with the Jews in Jerusalem dealing with Global Community forces storming the city and the people of Petra dealing with the vast sea of military forces surrounding the location. During the battle, Tsion is killed, and Buck and Rayford are wounded, Buck defending the Old City, and Rayford when he is shelled on a reconnaissance mission outside Petra. One of the two original Tribulation Force members dies at the end of the book.

== Characters ==
- Rayford Steele
- Cameron "Buck" Williams
- Chloe Steele Williams
- Dr. Tsion Ben-Judah
- Mac McCullum
- His Excellency Global Community Potentate Nicolae Carpathia
- Most High Reverend of Carpathianism Leon Fortunato
- Dr. Chaim Rosenzweig aka: Micah
- Leah Rose
- Ree Woo
- Lionel Whalum
- George Sebastian
- Kenny Bruce Williams
- Gustaf Zuckermandel Jr. (aka "Zeke" or "Z")
- Ming Toy
- Chang Wong
- Al B (aka: Albie)
- Abdullah Smith
- Viv Ivins
- Suhail Akbar
- Hannah Palemoon
- Otto Weser
