= Left Behind (2014 film) =

2014 film directed by Vic Armstrong

- Theatrical release poster
- Directed by: Vic Armstrong
- Written by: Paul LaLonde; John Patus
- Based on: Left Behind by Tim LaHaye and Jerry B. Jenkins
- Produced by: Paul LaLonde; Michael Walker; Ed Clydesdale
- Starring: Nicolas Cage; Chad Michael Murray; Cassi Thomson; Nicky Whelan; Jordin Sparks; Lea Thompson
- Cinematography: Jack Green
- Edited by: Michael J. Duthie
- Music by: Jack Lenz
- Production companies: Entertainment One; Stoney Lake Entertainment
- Distributed by: Freestyle Releasing
- Release date: October 3, 2014
- Running time: 110 minutes
- Country: United States
- Language: English
- Budget: $16 million
- Box office: $27.4 million

Left Behind is a 2014 American Christian apocalyptic thriller film directed by Vic Armstrong and written by Paul LaLonde and John Patus. Based on the 1995 novel of the same name written by Tim LaHaye and Jerry B. Jenkins, the film stars Nicolas Cage, Chad Michael Murray, Cassi Thomson, Nicky Whelan, Jordin Sparks, and Lea Thompson. It is the second film adaptation of the first novel in the Left Behind series. It depicts the worldwide disaster of the Rapture from the perspective of one family: a husband (airline pilot Rayford Steele) and wife facing marital difficulties, as well as their two children. The plot was altered to mostly take place on an airplane and the Antichrist does not appear.

Left Behind was released in theaters on October 3, 2014, by Freestyle Releasing. It was panned by critics and grossed $27.4 million worldwide against its $16 million production budget. A sequel featuring a new cast, titled Left Behind: Rise of the Antichrist, was released in 2023.

== Plot ==
University of Central Arkansas student Chloe Steele has flown home from college to New York to surprise her father, pilot Rayford Steele, for his birthday party. However, her mother, Irene, informs her that her father cannot make it. While at the airport waiting for him, Chloe meets investigative reporter Cameron "Buck" Williams.

Rayford shows up on his way to a flight and apologizes to Chloe for missing his birthday party, insisting he was called in to pilot a flight to London at the last minute. He also assures Chloe that things are fine between himself and his wife, who recently had become a proselytising Christian, much to Chloe's annoyance. Chloe suspects things are not fine between her parents; she had seen him flirting with flight attendant Hattie Durham and notices he has removed his wedding ring. Her suspicions are soon confirmed when an airport worker hands Chloe a pair of tickets for a concert in London that Rayford had ordered, proving that he'd planned the trip in advance.

Chloe brushes off another of her mother's preachings and takes her brother to the mall. As she hugs him, he vanishes, into thin air, leaving his clothes behind. The same has happened to numerous others at the mall. Mayhem breaks loose as shoppers begin looting the stores. A driverless car plows through the mall windows, and a small plane without a pilot crashes into the parking lot. Chloe sees television reports of children and some adults disappearing, as worldwide panic sets in.

On Rayford's flight, the same strange event has occurred; several people, including his co-pilot Chris Smith, Kimmy, one of the flight attendants, and all the children on board, have simply disappeared. The remaining passengers panic and demand answers. Rayford does his best to reassure the passengers he will pass on information once he has any. He has difficulty getting radio or satellite phone contact with anyone on the ground, until he is finally informed that people have disappeared everywhere and the world is in uproar. Soon a pilot-less jet approaches directly into their flight path resulting in a midair collision, which damages Rayford's fuel line. He decides his only option is to return to New York and hope his fuel holds out.

On the ground, Chloe hears her father's mayday call on her cell phone and assumes his plane has crashed. She later finds her mother's jewelry left behind in the still-running shower, as she has also disappeared. Chloe makes her way to her mother's church, where family pastor Bruce Barnes explains that God has taken his believers to heaven and the rest have to face the end of days. The pastor explains he was not taken because he did not really believe what he had preached. Rayford comes to the same conclusion after finding evidence of religious belief in his copilot and stewardess' personal effects. He tells Hattie about his wife. She is upset as she hadn't known he was married, but Rayford convinces her to be brave and to help calm the passengers down until they can safely land.

Chloe climbs to the top of a bridge, intending to commit suicide, but gets a call from Buck, who is in the cockpit with Rayford. Rayford explains to Chloe that all the New York-area airports are closed and the streets full, and he is low on fuel and has nowhere to land. Chloe finds an abandoned truck and uses it to clear away the equipment from a road under construction in order to create a makeshift runway. She uses her compass app and tells Rayford the coordinates of the landing site. Rayford is able to glide to a rough landing, saving the passengers, who leave the plane only to see the world aflame. As the film ends, Buck observes that it looks like the end of the world, while Chloe responds that it is just the beginning.

== Cast ==
- Nicolas Cage as Rayford Steele
- Chad Michael Murray as Cameron "Buck" Williams
- Cassi Thomson as Chloe Steele
- Nicky Whelan as Hattie Durham
- Jordin Sparks as Shasta Carvell
- Lea Thompson as Irene Steele
- Lance E. Nichols as Pastor Bruce Barnes
- William Ragsdale as Chris Smith
- Martin Klebba as Melvin Weir
- Quinton Aaron as Simon
- Judd Lormand as Jim
- Stephanie Honore as Kimmy
- Gary Grubbs as Dennis
- Georgina Rawlings as Venice Baxter
- Sam Velasquez as Stan Marsh
- Lolo Jones as Lori
- Han Soto as Edwin
- Major Dodson as Rayford "Raymie" Steele Jr.
- Alec Rayme as Hassid

== Production ==
On August 7, 2008, Cloud Ten Pictures entered into a settlement agreement resolving the two lawsuits against it and Namesake Entertainment, which co-produced the original trilogy. The suit was filed by Tim LaHaye. The settlement ended a legal dispute over the Left Behind film rights that began in 2000. On October 1, 2010, Cloud Ten again reacquired rights to the film, paving the way for a reboot of the Left Behind film series.

By October 31, 2011, Paul LaLonde and John Patus, who worked on World at War together, had written a screenplay for the reboot. By October 19, 2012, stunt artist Vic Armstrong was set to direct the reboot film with the budget around $15 million.

=== Casting ===
By October 19, 2012, Nicolas Cage was in talks to join the cast, as portraying lead character Rayford Steele. In December 2012, Chad Michael Murray was in talks to join the cast, to play the role of journalist Cameron "Buck" Williams. On January 3, 2013, Ashley Tisdale joined to play the role of Chloe Steele in the film, but later dropped out due to scheduling conflicts. In March 2013, Tia Mowry was in talks to join the cast. In August 2013 Jordin Sparks and Cassi Thomson joined the lead cast, the latter replacing Tisdale as Chloe Steele. On August 19, 2013, Olympic bobsledder and hurdler Lolo Jones joined the cast, portraying an airport gate attendant. On September 9, 2013, Lea Thompson was cast as Rayford Steele's wife, Irene.

The character Nicolae Carpathia, the antagonist in the book series and 2000 film, does not appear in the film.

=== Filming ===
Principal photography began on August 9, 2013, in Baton Rouge, Louisiana.

== Release ==
The film was released in theaters on October 3, 2014, in the United States via Stoney Lake Entertainment.

=== Home media ===
Left Behind was released via DVD and Blu-ray Disc on January 6, 2015.

== Reception ==
=== Box office ===
Left Behind played on 1,825 screens on its opening weekend, taking the number six position at the US box office with $6,300,147. The film gained 62 screens the following weekend, but posted a decline of 55% to end with $2,834,919. The third weekend saw the film dip to 923 screens and posted a 67.5% drop to $922,618. Its fourth weekend was the biggest drop yet for the movie at 71%, but rebounded in the later weeks. The final two weekends of the film's US theatrical release, however, posted a robust 265% increase before ending its run on December 11, 2014.

It debuted in Singapore and Russia on October 3, with the former grossing $101,585 from 13 screens and the latter grossing $620,636 from 470 screens. The following week, the film opened in three additional countries: Lebanon ($63,585 opening week) on October 8, and Malaysia ($303,833 opening week) and Philippines ($259,303 opening week) on October 9, all having the highest debuts in the top three, with the countries of Lebanon and Philippines had the film ranked second place on their Box Office Chart. The film opened in two more countries the following week. The film ranked eighth place in Taiwan and came in second place in the United Arab Emirates with $336,544 from 47 screens.

Egypt and Brazil soon followed on October 22 and 23, taking in $24,951 and $633,096, respectively. Brazil was the first country to post a second-week increase (albeit a scant +0.2%) and retained its fifth-place spot, making $634,150 (from 232 screens) for a total of $1,591,847. The film dropped 41% in its third week to end the weekend with $373,034 and a total of $2,221,533.

The movie debuted in South Africa on December 4, 2014, ranking 11th place with a total of $14,424.

The movie opened in Ecuador on April 17, 2015, debuting in 7th place with $15,055 from 11 screens. The movie dropped 6% the second week, earning $14,156 from 12 screens. However, its third week suffered a massive -88% decline, ending the weekend with $1,673 from 6 screens, for a total of $30,884.

The film was released in Italy on July 29, 2015, and took the no. 3 position with $309,832. In its second weekend, the film dropped two spots to number five with $164,047 (a decline of 47%). The third week saw a decline of only 18% but retained its fifth place spot to end the weekend with 134,186. The film fell out of the top 10 beginning in its fourth week, as it ended the week $23,627 (resulting in a steep 82% drop). The film dropped to number 14 in its fifth week with $15,326. The sixth week saw a drop to the 16th position, but saw a steady 32% increase to end the week with $21,026. The seventh and final week saw only a scant 3% fall to end the week with $20,414. Its seven-week cumulative total was $1,048,328.

As of March 4, 2016, the film closed and had grossed $14,019,924 in North America and $13,385,972 in other territories for a worldwide total of $27,405,896, plus $5.2 million with home video sales, against a production budget of $16 million.

=== Critical response ===
The film was panned by critics. On review aggregator Rotten Tomatoes, the film has an approval rating of 0% based on 69 reviews, with an average rating of 2.4/10. The website's critics consensus reads, "Yea verily, like unto a plague of locusts, Left Behind hath begat a further scourge of devastation upon Nicolas Cage's once-proud filmography." On Metacritic, the film has a score of 12 out of 100, based on 25 critics, indicating "overwhelming dislike". Audiences polled by CinemaScore gave the film an average grade of "B−" on an A+ to F scale.

In a review for Entertainment Weekly, film critic Lindsey Bahr gave the film a grade of F, writing, "At best, Left Behind is shoddily made sensationalist propaganda—with atrocious acting—that barely registers as entertainment. At worst, it's profoundly moronic. Audiences, Christian or not, deserve better, and it's hard to imagine that the ham-fisted revelations in this schlock could serve any higher purpose."

Richard Roeper gave the film a grade of D−, stating that "the writing is horrible, the direction is clunky, the special effects are not special [and] the acting is so wooden you could make a basketball court out of it. Everything about this film feels forced and overwrought. With all due respect: Oh. My. God."

On her ½ star review of the film, Linda Barnard from the Toronto Star writes, "The tantalizing prospect that this could have been a camp set-up of the Snakes on a Plane or Sharknado ilk pops up as Left Behind starts to echo 1970s flight deck-driven disaster films—and the parodies that followed. No such luck. Armstrong appears humourlessly earnest about his task. Score one for Satan."

Christian film critics were critical of Left Behind. Paul Chambers from MovieChambers.com begins his scathing review with, "There are millions of Christians with average or above-average intelligence. I'd like to think that I'm one of them. So, what possessed the makers of Left Behind to produce such an ignorant piece of garbage that's easily one of the worst films of 2014, if not all-time?"

Evangelical Christian magazine Christianity Today criticized the film, saying, "Left Behind is not a Christian movie, whatever 'Christian Movie' could even possibly mean. In fact, most Christians within the world of the movie—whether the street-preacher lady at the airport or Rayford Steele's wife—are portrayed as insistent, crazy, delusional, or at the very least just really annoying. They want churches to book whole theaters and take their congregations, want it to be a Youth Group event, want magazines like this one to publish Discussion Questions at the end of their reviews—want the system to churn away, all the while netting them cash, without ever having to have cared a shred about actual Christian belief. They want to trick you into caring about the movie. Don't." They also stated that they "tried to give the film zero stars, but our tech system won't allow it."

The film was praised by Tim LaHaye and Jerry Jenkins, the original authors of the Left Behind series. Neither liked the 2000 version, and LaHaye filed suit against it for breach of contract. After watching an early screening of the film, LaHaye said, "It is the best movie I have ever seen on the rapture", while Jenkins said, "I believe it does justice to the novel and will renew interest in the entire series." When asked if it was good, Jenkins said, "It's better than good."

=== Awards ===
Left Behind was nominated for three Razzies at the 35th Golden Raspberry Awards, for Worst Picture, Worst Screenplay, and Worst Actor for Nicolas Cage. It lost in all three categories to Saving Christmas, starring Kirk Cameron, who coincidentally starred in the original Left Behind film franchise.

== Sequel and spin-off ==
In November 2021, LaLonde announced the beginning of production on Left Behind: Rise of the Antichrist, with Kevin Sorbo directing and replacing Nicolas Cage as Rayford Steele along with other roles being recast entirely. The film is set six months after the events of the 2014 film. The film was released in theaters on January 26, 2023.

Vanished – Left Behind: Next Generation, a spin-off film based on the spin-off book series Left Behind: The Kids released on September 28, 2016, which was not connected to the reboot films. The film was produced by Tim LaHaye's grandson, Randy LaHaye and was well received by the book author.

== See also ==
- List of films with a 0% rating on Rotten Tomatoes
