= Glorious Appearing =

2004 novel by Tim LaHaye and Jerry B. Jenkins

Glorious Appearing: The End of Days
- The Hardback Cover
- Author: Tim LaHaye and Jerry B. Jenkins
- Cover artist: Photosisk/Getty Images
- Language: English
- Series: Left Behind Series
- Genre: Christian novel Speculative Fiction; Post-apocalyptic fiction
- Publisher: Tyndale House Publishers
- Publication date: Tuesday, March 30, 2004 (Hardback); Nov. 2004 (Paperback)
- Publication place: United States
- Media type: Print (Hardback & Paperback); Audiobook
- Pages: 432 pages
- ISBN: 0-8423-3240-5 (hardback edition); ISBN 0-8423-3237-5 (paperback edition)
- OCLC: 53967326
- Preceded by: Armageddon
- Followed by: Kingdom Come

Glorious Appearing: The End of Days is the 12th book in the Left Behind series by Tim LaHaye and Jerry B. Jenkins. Released on Tuesday, March 30, 2004, this book sees the surviving believers awaiting the return of Jesus Christ as the war of Armageddon and the seven-year Tribulation period draws to its climax. It was on The New York Times Best Seller list for 22 weeks.

Upon its publication, Glorious Appearing initially served as the conclusion of the Left Behind saga, drawing to a close numerous plot threads that had been developed since the first book in the series. Between 2004 and 2007, three prequel novels were published, exploring events leading up to the Rapture. In 2007, LaHaye and Jenkins followed up with a direct sequel to Glorious Appearing, Kingdom Come, which as of 2024 was the definitive end of the series.

== Plot summary ==
The story begins with the Antichrist, Nicolae Carpathia, after he has assembled the armies of the world in the Valley of Megiddo for what he believes will be his ultimate triumph of the ages. With a victory here, he would ascend to the throne of God. The Tribulation Force has migrated to the Middle East, most ensconced at Petra with the Jewish Remnant, now more than a million strong. Petra is surrounded by the Unity Army, poised to destroy all that is left of God's people and usher in Carpathia's new world order.

The world holds its breath as the greatest military battle to ever take place threatens to obliterate all that remains of free humanity. All seems lost. Tsion Ben-Judah and Cameron "Buck" Williams have been slain in Jerusalem, now overrun by Global Community forces. The hour of attack for Nicolae Carpathia's Global Community Unity Army to assault the Rebels at the Temple Mount draws near. Mac McCullum goes to Jerusalem undercover to find Buck Williams and discovers his dead body before being ushered to a meeting with several more troops and Nicolae Carpathia's cabinet in Solomon's Stables. After witnessing Chaim Rosensweig preaching at Petra through live television and the death of a Global Community Officer, there is a mysterious heat (hell?), through which Satan enters, and taunts Carpathia, telling of Satan' deeds on earth, including entering Judas Iscariot. Then Satan temporarily leaves Carpathia's body and reminds the now trembling, feeble shell of Nicolae Carpathia that he is merely a shell for him before indwelling him once again.

Rayford is greatly wounded from a Global Community mortar attack on Petra's perimeter and is left on the brink of death before being discovered by Leah Rose and Abdullah and brought back to Petra in heavy bandages due to his injuries. As Mac returns and Chaim visits Rayford as night falls, the sun and moon go out before the stars and meteors fall upon the Global Community army, slightly reducing their numbers before the Sign of the Son of Man (a giant cross) appears and heals Rayford and all other saved and undecided of their injuries, causing many to become saved, including one third of the Jewish Remnant.

This does not dissuade the enemies of God, as the Unity Army, led by Carpathia himself, makes their final charge against Petra, seeking to annihilate all remaining rebels against the Global Community, even children. But suddenly, as Nicolae begins leading the attack, the cross disappears from the sky as the Global Community's weaponry is rendered useless. Suddenly, the whole world is covered in a blinding light as the entire earth sees Jesus Christ coming in power and glory out of Heaven with the Armies and Raptured Saints of Heaven. As Jesus speaks, the entire third of the Global Community forces and Carpathia loyalists at Petra are slain with Nicolae and Leon fleeing to Bozrah. The Remnant at Petra are suddenly blessed with the ability to run at superhuman speeds, allowing them to arrive at Bozrah right before Jesus obliterates all the Global Community forces there and temporarily descends to the fields of Bozrah and stains his robe with blood, fulfilling the Prophecy of Isaiah 63:1-6 of Jesus trampling the enemies of God.

With Carpathia's forces gone in Bozrah, Nicolae and Leon board a helicopter to the Valley of Megiddo where the other two thirds of the Unity Army are stationed. As the Remnant passes the Valley to get to Jerusalem, Rayford, Abdullah and Mac drive to a ledge of the Valley of Megiddo and witness Jesus obliterating the remaining two thirds of the Unity Army which are not at Jerusalem or around the world with the Seventh Bowl judgement and a loud cry from God in Heaven shouting "IT IS DONE!" . Viv Ivins is killed by a large hailstone crushing her before Nicolae and Leon escape the rising swamp of blood and gore of the fallen Global Community troops and make for Jerusalem in a Humvee.

As Rayford, Mac, Abdullah and the rest of the Remnant arrive at Jerusalem, so does Nicolae and Leon, welcomed by Global Community loyalists. Nicolae mounts horseback, preparing to attack the Rebels at the Temple Mount before the horses are afflicted with a flesh-dissolving plague. Jesus appears in the sky again with the Armies of Heaven and Nicolae orders missiles shot at Jesus but to no avail. As the Global Community troops at Jerusalem die, Nicolae and Leon along with what's left of the Global Community forces arrive at the Mount of Olives as Jesus dismounts and descends onto the Mount of Olives, causing a great earthquake that splits the Mount of Olives in two. The last of the Global Community forces at Jerusalem die as Nicolae and Leon flee for safety. The Mount of Olives splitting also ushers in the largest global earthquake ever felt, completely flattening the world and causing Jerusalem to rise more than three hundred feet. The remaining Global Community forces and Carpathia loyalists bearing the Mark of the Beast are killed simultaneously by the Word of God and the Global Community is finally overthrown.

Jesus enters through the East Gate into Jerusalem and calls all the Christians to him where he comforts them. Michael, the archangel, captures Nicolae Carpathia, Leon Fortunato along with Ashtaroth, Baal, and Cankerworm. Jesus personally shames Ashtaroth, Baal, and Cankerworm before destroying them. Leon is driven to tears and attempts to renounce Nicolae and Satan before being sentenced to eternity in the Lake of Fire. Nicolae at first refuses to bow to Jesus until Jesus casts Satan out of him, causing Nicolae to revert to what he would look like if Satan had not caused him to come back to life three and a half years prior. The feeble, elderly and rotting remains of what was Nicolae Carpathia bows to Jesus before confessing that Jesus is Lord and the Son of God along with confessing that he wasted his entire life on personal gain in his quest for power. Jesus then opens a hole in the ground which leads directly to the Lake of Fire before Nicolae Carpathia and Leon Fortunato are thrown into it and enter into eternal torment.

Michael then captures Satan and Jesus personally lays the charges on him, going back to the original rebellion in Heaven. Michael then chains Satan up and binds him before throwing him into the Bottomless Pit, where he will remain until the end of Jesus' 1,000-year reign. Jesus then departs for the Temple's throne as Believers find one another and find temporary lodging in houses and residential areas in Jerusalem.

The next day, Jesus gathers the entire remaining population of the earth in the Valley of Jehosaphat where the Sheep and Goats judgement occurs. Jesus banishes all those who still haven't accepted him as their saviour to Hell before resurrecting the dead Tribulation Saints and Old Testament saints before giving all of them their rewards. The Tribulation Saints along with the Raptured Church then re-unite with the surviving Tribulation Saints. Rayford is re-united with his wife Irene and son Raymie, and Kenny with Buck and Chloe, along with all the other saved characters who died throughout the series including Ken Ritz, Tsion Ben-Judah and his family, Hattie Durham, Floyd Charles, and others re-uniting in Glorified Bodies as the 75-day interval between the Glorious Appearing and the Millennium World begins.

== Reception ==
In the National Review, the Catholic author Carl E. Olson described Glorious Appearing as "400 pages of repetitive, numbing bombast", and said that the premillennialist dispensationalist theology that forms the theological basis for the novels "is rejected, either explicitly or implicitly, by the Catholic Church, the Eastern Orthodox churches, and nearly every major Protestant denomination". Olson also argues that the plot and details of the Left Behind series are similar to-and possibly plagiarised from-the Rapture novel 666 by Salem Kirban.
