= Vanished – Left Behind: Next Generation =

2016 film directed by Larry A. McLean

Vanished - Left Behind: Next Generation
- DVD cover
- Directed by: Larry A. McLean
- Screenplay by: Kim Beyer-Johnson; Joan Considine Johnson
- Based on: The Vanishings by Tim LaHaye and Jerry B. Jenkins
- Produced by: Dave Alan Johnson; Randy LaHaye; Karl Horstmann; Dale Weller
- Starring: Amber Frank; Mason Dye; Dylan Sprayberry; Tom Everett Scott
- Cinematography: Pete Wages
- Edited by: Gordon McClellan
- Music by: Josh Debney; Andrew Grush; BJ Davis
- Production companies: Faith Capital Group; Salt Entertainment Group; Triple Horse Studios
- Distributed by: EchoLight Studios
- Release date: September 28, 2016
- Running time: 88 minutes
- Country: United States
- Language: English

Vanished – Left Behind: Next Generation is a 2016 American action-adventure drama film directed by Larry A. McLean, with a screenplay written by Kim Beyer-Johnson and Joan Considine Johnson. It stars Amber Frank, Mason Dye, Dylan Sprayberry and Tom Everett Scott. It is based on the first book in the Left Behind: The Kids series by Tim LaHaye and Jerry B. Jenkins and serves as a spin-off from the Left Behind film series.

The film was released selected theaters on September 28, 2016, and was released on DVD on November 17, 2016.

== Premise ==
After a billion people vanish, Gabby, a 15-year-old girl, suddenly has to take care of her little sister. Gabby, her sister, and two teens vying for her attention try to figure out what happened as they survive in a new world.

== Cast ==
- Amber Frank as Gabby Harlow
- Mason Dye as Josh Jackson
- Dylan Sprayberry as Flynn
- Tom Everett Scott as Damon
- Jackson Hurst as Eric Harlow
- Brigid Brannagh as Sarah
- Keely Wilson as Claire Harlow
- Rachel Hendrix as Rachel
- Randy LaHaye as Nicolae Carpathia
- Tara Erickson as Screaming Mom
- Chip Lane as Rex Hargrove
- Dr. Tony Evans as Pastor Vernon Billings
- William Gabriel Grier as Associate Pastor Bruce Barnes
