= Clarence Gilyard =

American actor (1955–2022)

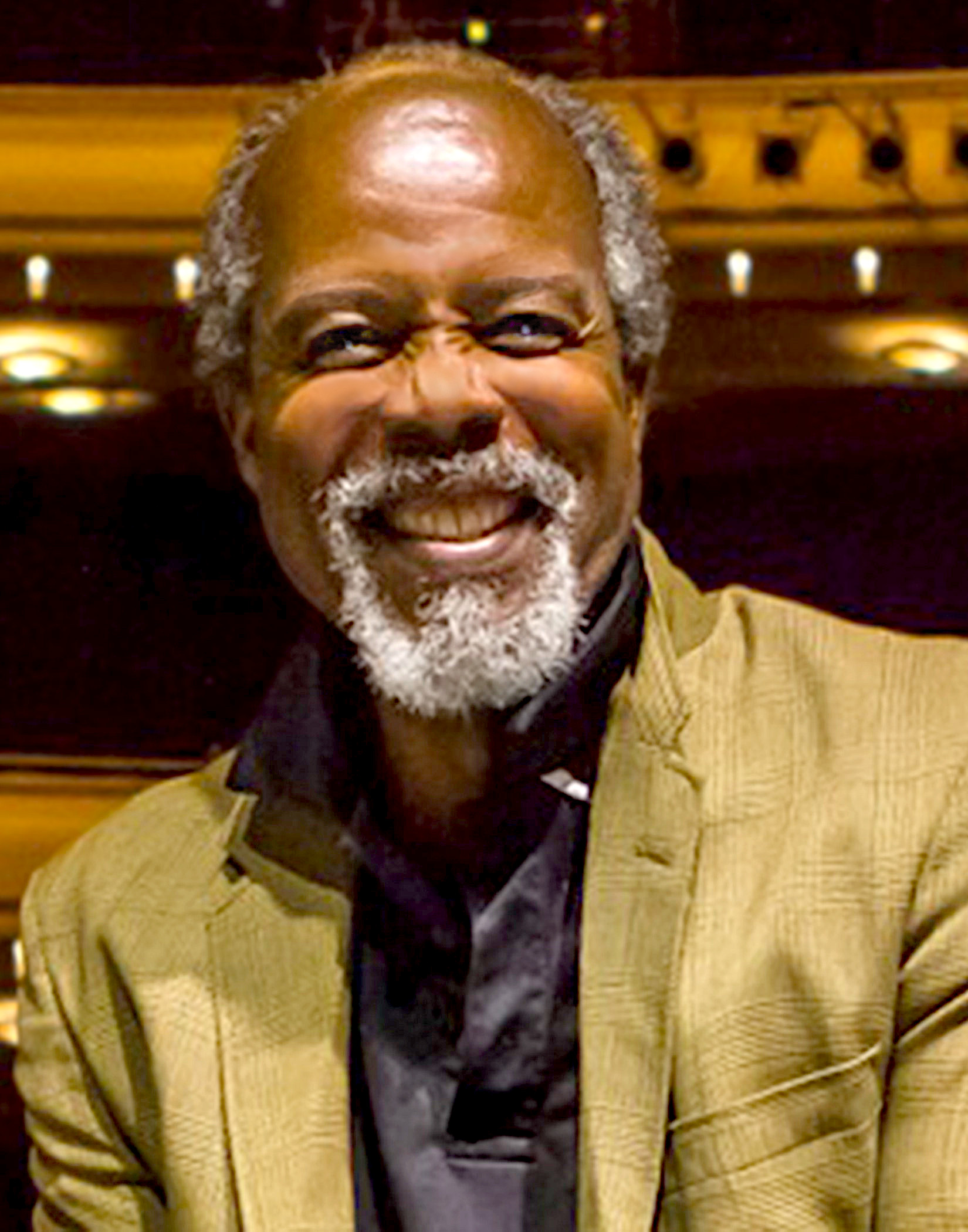
- Gilyard in 2018
- Born: Clarence Darnell Gilyard Jr. December 24, 1955; Moses Lake, Washington, U.S.
- Died: November 28, 2022 (aged 66); Las Vegas, Nevada, U.S.
- Resting place: Forest Lawn Memorial Park, Los Angeles, California, U.S.
- Other names: Clarence Darnell Gilyard, Jr.
- Education: California State University, Dominguez Hills (BA); Southern Methodist University (MFA)
- Occupation: Actor
- Years active: 1980–2022
- Spouses: Catherine Dutko (divorced) Elena Castillo (m. 2001)
- Children: 6

Clarence Darnell Gilyard Jr. (December 24, 1955 – November 23, 2022) was an American actor and educator. On television, he played private investigator Conrad McMasters on the legal drama series Matlock (1986–95) and Texas Ranger Jimmy Trivette on Walker, Texas Ranger (1993–2001).

Gilyard also had supporting roles in the 1980s action films Top Gun, as Radar Intercept Officer "Sundown", and Die Hard, as terrorist computer expert Theo.

Gilyard was an associate professor of acting at the University of Nevada, Las Vegas from 2006 until his death in 2022.

== Early life ==
Gilyard was born into a military family in Moses Lake, Washington, on Christmas Eve, in 1955, the son of Barbara and Clarence Alfred Gilyard Sr., a U.S. Air Force officer. Gilyard was the second of six children. His family was originally from New Orleans, Louisiana, but Gilyard grew up on Air Force bases in Hawaii, Texas, and Florida. Raised primarily as a Lutheran, he became Catholic in the 1990s.

During his young adulthood, Gilyard lived in the San Bernardino suburb of Rialto, California, and attended Eisenhower High School. He was an excellent student, graduating in 1974, and afterward spent a year as an Air Force Academy cadet before leaving the service to attend Sterling College. In college, he played football, and became a member of the Sigma Chi fraternity. He also received a tennis scholarship, but dropped out of school before completing his studies.

While living with his parents during his college years, Gilyard was preoccupied with women, alcohol, and occasionally, drugs. His parents urged him to move out, so he relocated to Long Beach, California, with a friend. He attended California State University, Long Beach, majoring in acting, and worked as a waiter while seeking acting opportunities. He completed his bachelor's degree at California State University, Dominguez Hills.

Gilyard worked with a housemate at a clothing store, where he was promoted to manager. He left this to work briefly selling industrial chemicals.

== Career ==
=== Actor ===
In 1979, Gilyard moved to Los Angeles to become an actor. Among other work, a role in the play Bleacher Bums made him what one magazine called "the first black actor to play a cheerleader", before he segued into television roles. As a character actor, Gilyard made guest appearances on TV shows such as Diff'rent Strokes, The Facts of Life, 227, Simon & Simon, and Riptide. In 1982–1983, Gilyard was cast in the final season of the NBC TV series CHiPs as Officer Benjamin Webster, opposite Erik Estrada. He co-starred with Jim Carrey in the 1984 NBC sitcom The Duck Factory. He appeared in a commercial for McDonald's in 1987.

Gilyard's movie debut in 1986 was as an F-14 Tomcat radar intercept officer, LT. (JG) Marcus "Sundown" Williams, in Top Gun. He was also a military man in the 1986 film The Karate Kid Part II. He appeared in the 1988 action film Die Hard as Theo, a criminal computer expert. He also appeared as Reverend Bruce Barnes in Left Behind: The Movie and its sequel, Left Behind II: Tribulation Force.

Gilyard played the role of Ben Matlock's private investigator, Conrad McMasters, on Matlock opposite Andy Griffith from 1989 to 1993. He replaced Kene Holliday, who was fired for his dependency on drugs and alcohol. Gilyard appeared in almost every Matlock episode starting in season 3 of the show. When the show moved from NBC to ABC for the series' seventh season, production moved from Los Angeles to Wilmington, North Carolina. Andy Griffith suggested to Gilyard that he move there, too, which he did, before departing to work on a pilot for another series at CBS the following year.

In 1993, he began another long-time co-starring role opposite Chuck Norris on Walker, Texas Ranger. Gilyard portrayed fellow Texas Ranger and best friend of Walker, James "Jimmy" Trivette. Gilyard had a cameo appearance in the 2005 television movie, Walker, Texas Ranger: Trial by Fire.

In 2012, after taking time off to teach, Gilyard began appearing onscreen again, mostly in independent projects. In 2014, he appeared in the religious film A Matter of Faith.

On January 17, 2016, Gilyard performed the role of Hoak Colburn onstage at the University of New Mexico's Popejoy Hall in the Neil Simon Festival's Driving Miss Daisy, opposite his former Walker, Texas Ranger co-star, Sheree J. Wilson.

In the 2018 edition of the football video game Madden NFL, Gilyard plays high school coach Devin Wade in the "Longshot" section of the game. Two years later, Gilyard reprised his role as criminal gang member Theo from Die Hard, alongside star Bruce Willis, in a commercial for Advance Auto Parts' DieHard brand of car batteries.

=== Continued education and teaching work ===
In 2003, Gilyard returned to school, receiving a Master of Fine Arts in theatre performance at Southern Methodist University.

In 2006, Gilyard took a break from acting and became an associate professor in the College of Fine Arts – Department of Theatre at the University of Nevada, Las Vegas, where he taught stage and screen acting. He continued to teach for many years. Following his death, the school's film chair said "Professor Gilyard was a beacon of light and strength for everyone around at UNLV".

== Personal life ==
Gilyard was married twice and had six children. His first marriage, to Catherine Dutko in 1989, ended in divorce, and he married his second wife, Elena Castillo, in 2001. He served as the consultant of the communications committee of the United States Conference of Catholic Bishops.

== Death ==
After a long illness, Gilyard died at his home in Las Vegas, Nevada, on November 23, 2022, at the age of 66. He was cremated after a private ceremony.

== Filmography ==
=== Film ===
Year	Title	Role	Notes
1986	Top Gun	Lieutenant Junior Grade Marcus "Sundown" Williams	
1986	The Karate Kid Part II	G.I. #1	
1987	Off the Mark	James B. White	
1988	Die Hard	Theo	
2000	Left Behind: The Movie	Bruce Barnes	
2002	Left Behind II: Tribulation Force	Bruce Barnes	
2012	Little Monsters	Ben Foreman	
2013	From Above	Jeremiah Ward	
2014	A Matter of Faith	Professor Portland	
2015	The Track	Psychiatrist	
2016	The Beast	Auguste Porter	
2016	The Sector	Reverend Raines	
2019	The Perfect Race	Coach Michaels	
2021	Legacy of a Spy	Bill Pope	Short, (final film role)

=== Television ===
Year	Title	Role	Notes
1981	Diff'rent Strokes	Frank Simpson / The Student	2 episodes
1982	Making the Grade	Unknown	Episode: Teach Me Tonight
1982–83	CHiPs	Officer Benjamin Webster	20 episodes
1983	The Kid with the 200 I.Q.	Unknown	TV movie
1984	Things Are Looking Up	Clement McCallister	TV movie
1984	The Duck Factory	Roland Culp	13 episodes
1984	Riptide	William Collins	Episode: It's a Vial Sort of Business
1985	Solomon's Universe	Casey	TV movie
1986	Simon & Simon	Wally Stokes	Episode: A.W.O.L.
1987	227	Harold Bailey	Episode: Matchmakers
1987	The Facts of Life	Matt	Episode: The More the Marrier
1989	L.A. Takedown	Mustafa Jackson	TV movie
1989–93	Matlock	Conrad McMasters	Main cast
1990	The Great Los Angeles Earthquake	Roy Bryant	TV movie
1993–2001	Walker, Texas Ranger	Ranger James Trivette	Main cast
1994	Walker Texas Ranger 3: Deadly Reunion	Ranger James Trivette	TV movie
1999	Sons of Thunder	Ranger James Trivette	Episode: Flighting Back
2005	Walker, Texas Ranger: Trial by Fire	Ranger James Trivette	TV movie
2018	Christmas on the Coast	Fletcher Reese	TV movie
2020	Eleanor's Bench	Reginald	TV movie
