= Left Behind (novel) =

1995 novel by Tim LaHaye and Jerry B. Jenkins

Left Behind: A Novel of the Earth's Last Days
- Reissue of Left Behind using original artwork
- Author: Tim LaHaye and Jerry B. Jenkins
- Cover artist: Westlight/H. Armstrong Roberts
- Language: English
- Series: Left Behind (series)
- Genre: Christian fiction, Apocalyptic fiction
- Publisher: Tyndale House Publishers
- Publication date: Sunday, December 31, 1995
- Publication place: United States
- Media type: Print (Hardcover, Paperback; also made into Graphic novel and audiobook)
- Pages: 320 pages, hardcover 468 pages, paperback
- ISBN: 0-8423-2911-0 (HC), ISBN 0-8423-4270-2 (PB)
- OCLC: 32509183
- Dewey Decimal: 813/.54 20
- LC Class: PS3562.A315 L44 1995
- Preceded by: The Rapture
- Followed by: Tribulation Force

Left Behind: A Novel of the Earth's Last Days is a best-selling novel by Tim LaHaye and Jerry B. Jenkins that starts the Left Behind series. This book and others in the series give narrative form to a specific eschatological reading of the Christian Bible, particularly the Book of Revelation inspired by dispensationalism and premillennialism. It was released on Sunday, December 31, 1995. The events take place during the day of the Rapture and the two weeks following.

== Plot summary ==
The story begins with Cameron "Buck" Williams, a renowned journalist having recently survived an attempted invasion of Israel, on board a plane piloted by Rayford Steele en route to London. Suddenly, several passengers instantly vanish, leaving behind their clothes and other personal items. Upon being notified by flight attendant Hattie Durham, Steele contacts another pilot, only to learn that millions of people around the world have also disappeared in the same way.

Steele lands the plane in Chicago, which has descended into anarchy and chaos. He returns home and discovers that his wife Irene and son Raymie have vanished. He soon realizes that the Rapture, the taking of all Christians, has occurred. He later reunites with his distraught daughter Chloe. Williams arrives in New York City where he meets with his father. However, he soon receives a call from his British contact Dirk, who informs him of a rising European politician. He later learns that the politician is Romanian President Nicolae Carpathia, who gives a rousing speech at the United Nations.

Steele meets with Bruce Barnes, the pastor of the church his wife Irene attended. Barnes reveals he was left behind for not truly believing in God and Christ. He then explains that the Tribulation, a period of chaos and suffering, will soon begin. Chloe, after some debating, ultimately accepts the truth and becomes a Christian with her father.

Williams soon learns that Dirk has been found dead of a "suicide" and that an associate has also died. He manages to secure a meeting in London with Scotland Yard detective Alan Tompkins. Tompkins reveals evidence that Dirk was murdered, and that he has uncovered a conspiracy involving Joshua Todd-Cochran, the head of the London Stock Exchange, and American banker Jonathan Stonegal. Tompkins is abruptly murdered at the meeting, and Williams barely escapes.

Williams later learns that Scotland Yard has deemed him a suspect in Tompkins' death. He arranges an interview with Carpathia, who uses his power and influence to remove Williams from suspicion. Carpathia reveals his intention to broker a seven-year peace deal with Israel, and build the Third Temple in Jerusalem.

Williams meets up with Steele and Barnes, and informs the latter of Carpathia's plans. Barnes identifies them with those of the Antichrist, the prophesied end-times tyrant, and urges Williams to accept Christ before it is too late. Williams is skeptical and leaves, but Barnes decides to form the "Tribulation Force", a Christian organization with the purpose of resisting the coming reign of the Antichrist.

Williams arrives at the United Nations to attend an assembly hosted by Carpathia. He soon learns, to his shock, that Stonegal and Cochran are there. He reluctantly becomes a Christian before entering.

At the meeting, Williams realizes that Carpathia is indeed the Antichrist. Carpathia suddenly executes Cochran and Stonegal, no longer needing them, and brainwashes everyone (except Williams, who is divinely protected) to think they died in a murder-suicide.

Having narrowly escaped the meeting, Williams meets up with the Tribulation Force and becomes a member to prepare for the Tribulation.

== Characters ==
- Rayford Steele – The protagonist. 747 captain for Pan-Continental in his mid-forties. He is member, but non-attender, at New Hope Village Church in Mount Prospect, Illinois.
- Chloe Steele, Rayford's daughter, who is a student at Stanford University in her early twenties and skeptical of Christianity. She lost her mother and brother in the Rapture. Chloe resides in California.
- Cameron "Buck" Williams – journalist and senior writer for Global Weekly in New York City who writes the "Newsmaker of the Year" story on Chaim Rosenzweig.
- Bruce Barnes – associate pastor in his mid-forties at New Hope Village Church who must lead a new congregation.
- Joshua Todd-Cothran – international financier, head of the London Stock Exchange.
- Jonathan Stonagal – international financier and wealthiest man in history.
- Ken Ritz – charter pilot
- Chaim Rosenzweig – Israeli botanist and statesman who discovers a formula that makes Israeli deserts bloom; former Global Weekly Man of the Year.
- Dirk Burton, Informant
- Alan Tompkins, Scotland Yard detective
- Steve Plank – publisher of the Global Weekly and old-school journalist; Cameron's boss.
- Hattie Durham – Senior flight attendant for Pan-Continental Airlines.
- Nicolae Carpathia – President of Romania
- Stanton Bailey – Publisher of Global Weekly
- Mwangati Ngumo, of Botswana, Secretary-General of the United Nations until Nicolae Carpathia takes over
- Eric Miller – journalist/writer at Seaboard
- Marge Potter – secretary at Global Weekly in New York
- Carolyn Miller – Eric Miller's wife
- Scott M. Otterness – UN Security

== Major themes ==
Christian tribulation theory is played out in a context around the theme of the Rapture, based on the First Epistle to the Thessalonians. Amongst those who believe there will be a Rapture, there are three main theories on the timing of this event: pre-tribulation, midtribulation, and posttribulation. This book takes the pre-tribulation rapture position. The story is built around such end times themes as the Second Coming, the Antichrist, the Tribulation, and the expected coming Millennium of Messiah.

== Reception ==
This novel has received a wide range of reactions. The American Evangelical Christian community, in general, has approved of the idea of representing in a worldly language the end-times theology. Jerry Falwell said: "In terms of its impact on Christianity, it's probably greater than that of any other book in modern times, outside the Bible." Nonreligious reviewers and reviewers with differing religious viewpoints have typically given it unfavorable reviews.

The New York Times stated in an article, "The formula combines Tom Clancy-like suspense with touches of romance, high-tech flash and Biblical references." The Chicago Tribune called it "...an exciting, stay-up-late-into-the-night, page turner story." Publishers Weekly called Left Behind "...the most successful Christian Fiction series ever." A review in The Washington Post called the novels a "stodgily written blend of B-movie science fantasy and horror."

=== Controversies and criticisms ===
Some evangelicals object to the message of Left Behind because they say it is not a Christian message, although framed as a Christian series. Loren L. Johns, the Academic Dean of the Associated Mennonite Biblical Seminary, writes: "At the end of the day, this series is ultimately a rejection of the good news of Jesus Christ. I say this because it rejects the way of the cross and Jesus' call to obedient discipleship and a new way of life. It celebrates the human will to power, putting Evangelical Christians in the heroic role of God's Green Berets. [...] Love of enemies is treated as a misguided strategy associated not with the gospel, but with the Antichrist."

The Commission on Theology and Church Relations of the Lutheran Church–Missouri Synod reported that "the ideas expressed in the Left Behind series are in many ways contrary to the teaching of Holy Scripture. Though containing a fictional story line, the books promote a theology that is, in important respects, at odds with the biblical revelation."

The interpretation of the Book of Revelation, as presented in the Left Behind series, also appears to encourage a highly individualistic approach to salvation that eschews responsibility for performing good deeds or missionizing: "Because, in the novels, those who take the mark of the beast cannot be saved, saving oneself and punishing one's enemies are the only viable courses of action for believers [...] Working toward social justice is not necessary and might even distract believers from their steadfast focus on their own salvation and the salvation of their family, friends or community." According to Kilde and Forbes, the books promotes a violent context for viewing and resolving social problems, one in which the only solution to social problems is to kill those who engage in any practices considered by the authors as "evil".

While both the authors and the publisher have claimed that thousands of readers have experienced a Christian conversion due to the novels, scholars such as Frykholm have been unable to document even a single case in which a reader experienced a Christian conversion. When Frykholm requested evidence of conversion from the publisher, Tyndale submitted only seven cases; four were reportedly hearsay and three were reportedly readers that had reaffirmed their lapsed faith in Christianity.

== Film adaptations ==
This book has been adapted into a feature film, Left Behind: The Movie, first released on video and DVD, and then to cinemas where it fared poorly. In the movie, Cameron "Buck" Williams was played by former Growing Pains star Kirk Cameron, who said he finds the series inspiring; he is a practicing evangelist and co-host with Ray Comfort on the TV show The Way of the Master.

To date, two sequels have been released straight to video – Left Behind II: Tribulation Force and Left Behind: World at War, the latter of which premiered in churches before its video and DVD release. A fourth installment was announced by Cloud Ten Pictures in 2006, but the development has been placed on hold since the July 2008 settlement of a lawsuit over rights involving the first three films.

In August 2008, a website revealed that LaHaye plans to remake the series and possibly turn all twelve (or sixteen) novels into feature film adaptations. In October 2014, the second Left Behind remake, starring Nicolas Cage, was released to universally negative critical reviews.

== Release details ==
- 1995, U.S.: Tyndale House ISBN 0-8423-2911-0, Pub. date December 31, 1995, Hardback
- 1995, U.S.: Tyndale House ISBN 0-8423-1675-2, Pub. date ? December 1995, Audio Cassette
- 1999, U.S.: Tyndale House ISBN 0-8423-2912-9, Pub. date ? February 1999, Paperback
- 2000, U.S.: Chivers, Windsor, Paragon & Co ISBN 0-7862-2468-1, Pub. date ? September 2000, Large Print
- 2000, U.K.: Tyndale House ISBN 0-8423-4270-2, Pub. date September 30
