= Cassi Thomson =

Australian-born American actress, singer and songwriter (born 1993)

- Born: Cassi Nicole Thomson; 14 August 1993 (age 33); Queensland, Australia
- Occupations: Actress, singer, songwriter
- Years active: 1998–present
- Website: cassithomson.com

Cassi Nicole Thomson (born 14 August 1993) is an Australian-born American actress, singer and songwriter. She is best known for her recurring role as Cara Lynn Walker in the television series Big Love and for her role as Nikki Papagus on the series Switched at Birth. She has also guest starred in several television series, such as Without a Trace, ER, House M.D., and CSI: Miami.

== Life and career ==
Thomson was born in Queensland, Australia. She lived on a ranch in Vanuatu until she was 5 years old after which her family moved to New Haven, Missouri, in the United States. She currently lives in Los Angeles, California.

Thomson is an actress, appearing on film and television. She played recurring roles in the TV shows Big Love and Switched at Birth. She co-starred in the small-budget movie Cop Dog at age 15 in 2008. She starred in the 2014 reboot film Left Behind with Nicolas Cage and Chad Michael Murray. The film received mostly negative reviews from critics.

Thomson has also worked as a singer-songwriter. She completed her first music video in 2008, featuring her single "Caught Up in You", which co-stars Taylor Lautner.

== Filmography ==
Film and television
Year	Title	Role	Notes
2006	Without a Trace	Sarah Jameson	Episode: "The Road Home"
2006	House	Kama Walters	Episode: "Whac-A-Mole"
2006	ER	Lulu Davis	Episode: "Scoop and Run"
2008	Cop Dog	Deb Rogers	
2008	Our First Christmas	Tory	TV film
2009	Hawthorne	Amy Johnson	Episode: "The Sense of Belonging"
2009–11	Big Love	Cara Lynn	Recurring role (20 episodes)
2010	CSI: Crime Scene Investigation	Katy	Episode: "Field Mice"
2011	Margene's Blog	Cara Lynn	Episode: "Crush Story"
2011	CSI: Miami	Kaylee Anderson	Episode: "Mayday"
2011	Rock the House	Karen Petersen	TV film
2012	Teenage Bank Heist	Abbie	TV film
2012–14	Switched at Birth	Nikki Papagus	Recurring role
2014	1000 to 1: The Cory Weissman Story	Ally	Direct-to-video
2013	Grave Halloween	Amber	SyFy TV Film
2014	Left Behind	Chloe Steele	
2015	Minority Report	Barmaid	season 1 episode 7
2016	Hawaii Five-0	Addison Wells	Episode: "I’ike Ke Ao"
2018	NCIS	Angie Gray	Episode: "Tailing Angie"
2019	Gloria Bell	Virginia	
2019	Lucifer	Beth Murphy	Episode: "Save Lucifer"
