= Rayford Steele =

- Left Behind character
- First appearance: Left Behind
- Last appearance: Kingdom Come
- Created by: Tim LaHaye and Jerry B. Jenkins
- Portrayed by: Brad Johnson (2000-2005); Nicolas Cage (2014); Kevin Sorbo (2022)

In-universe information
- Gender: Male
- Title: Leader of Tribulation Force
- Occupation: Pilot
- Family: Cameron "Buck" Williams (Son in law); Kenneth Bruce Williams (Grandson)
- Spouse: Irene Steele (first wife); Amanda White (second wife)
- Children: Chloe Steele (daughter); Raymie Steele (son)
- Religion: Christian
- Nationality: American

Rayford Steele is a fictional character and the de facto protagonist in the Left Behind series of novels by Tim LaHaye and Jerry B. Jenkins. He is the leader of the group known as the Tribulation Force, and is the most fully developed character in the series.

== Fictional biography ==
=== Early life and marriage ===
Rayford was born 42 YBR (years before the Rapture) in Belvidere, Illinois to working-class parents. During childhood, Rayford's low socioeconomic status embarrassed him, and he dedicated his life to attending college and becoming either a professional athlete or a pilot. When he attended Belvidere High School, he was voted Homecoming King. He eventually obtained an Air Force ROTC scholarship to attend Purdue University; while there, he met a fellow ROTC cadet two years his junior, Irene. They fell in love and married in the spring of his senior year, and just a year later, his daughter Chloe was born. Over the next several years, Rayford leaves the Air Force and begins working as a pilot for Pan-Continental Airlines; when he is thirty, he and Irene unexpectedly have a son, Raymie.

Though raised in a churchgoing family, Rayford cannot conceive of “faith” being anything more than attending church, trying to be a good person, and helping one another, nor can he imagine what is meant by a "personal relationship" with Christ.

Three years after Raymie is born, Rayford has a brush with death when he nearly collides with another airplane while landing at LAX, and he impulsively promises God that he will go to church and pray more regularly; on the same night, Irene, after talking to a neighborhood friend, becomes a born-again Christian. They are soon at odds over her newfound faith and he reneges on his promises to God.

Though his job at Pan-Con enables him to afford a large house and expensive cars, he finds that these material things do not bring him the satisfaction he had expected, and he increasingly withdraws into himself, sullen at Irene's constant pushing him to "receive Jesus as his Savior." As a father, he is pleased with Chloe's questioning, independent streak, and though he loves Raymie, he is dissatisfied with what he perceives as the boy's soft and overly compassionate nature – as well as the enthusiasm he shares with Irene for everything church-related.

=== The Rapture ===
By the time of the Rapture, Rayford is a self-described (afterward) “negligent father and lustful husband with a roving eye,” on the verge of an affair with his senior flight attendant, Hattie Durham. He is piloting an overnight flight to London when the Rapture happens, and in the ensuing chaos, he returns home to find – as he feared – that Irene and Raymie are among the missing, for his wife had often told him how she anticipated Jesus “calling His people home.”

In desperation, he goes to Irene's church, New Hope Village Church, to find only one member of the staff left – the visitation pastor, Bruce Barnes, who has already realized his error and urges Rayford to “receive Christ” as well. While watching a pre-made videotape left by the Raptured pastor of the church, Rayford finally acknowledges his sinfulness and accepts Christ as his Savior. He is thrilled when Chloe soon does the same, and together under Barnes's tutelage, they form the Tribulation Force to face the travails of the next seven years and to counter the plans of the Antichrist, who is soon revealed to be the new head of the United Nations, Nicolae Carpathia. During this time, celebrated journalist and fellow Tribulation Force member Cameron "Buck" Williams becomes Rayford's son-in-law when he meets and marries Chloe.

=== The Tribulation ===
Through a bizarre set of circumstances, Rayford marries Amanda White, takes over as the leader of the Tribulation Force after Barnes dies in World War III, and moves to New Babylon, the seat of Carpathia's new world government. While his wife, Amanda, flies to New Babylon, the Wrath of the Lamb earthquake occurs. He later finds her body in a plane submerged in the Tigris River. Carpathia's operatives attempt to discredit Amanda by planting false evidence that she was a mole for Nicolae's regime but Rayford sees through the subterfuge.

After a botched plan in Denver, Colorado, Rayford is looked on with suspicion by the Global Community. During an assignment in Jerusalem, his co-pilot and friend that he led to Christ Mac McCullum tells him to flee. Rayford catches a ride with Christian charter pilot Ken Ritz back to the new Trib Force safe house near Chicago. Meanwhile, Chloe gives birth to Rayford's grandson, Kenny Bruce Williams.

Filled with rage over so many losses, Rayford soon dreams to be the one who will kill Carpathia, and goes as far as buying the Saber gun from Albie just to do it. During the gala week festivities in Jerusalem, he places himself during Carpathia's speech and, as he readies his weapon, he chokes, unable to go through with his plan. Although the weapon goes off by mistake, it misses Carpathia, giving the real murderer, former Carpathia loyalist Chaim Rosenzweig, time to do the job himself.

Rayford flees amidst the chaos, and escapes to Greece, where he is housed by local believers. With the advice of a Greek pastor, Rayford comes to terms with his rageful emotions and expresses regret to God for his selfishness. This helps him ready himself to become a better leader as the Great Tribulation is ushered in with the resurrection of Carpathia, indwelt by the spirit of Satan himself. The system of the Mark of the Beast is established soon after this, and believers all over the world must go into hiding or face execution.

Rayford organizes and helps lead Operation Eagle, a mass exodus of believers, especially Jews, to the stone city of Petra, which God promised to protect during the Great Tribulation. This enrages Carpathia, who orders the city to be bombed. However, when the bombs hit the city, the explosion has no effect on the city or its inhabitants, reminiscent of the biblical story of the fiery furnace.

In the months leading up to the Glorious Appearing, several Trib Force members are killed, including Chloe and Buck. During the battle of Armageddon, Rayford is critically wounded by a stray GC missile. He is the only original surviving member of the Tribulation Force left when Jesus Christ returns to the earth, whose very presence heals Rayford's wounds. After slaying the GC Unity Army and banishing both Antichrist and his False prophet to the Lake of Fire, Jesus welcomes all the saints who were raptured or martyred back to earth. The Tribulation is over and Rayford reunites with his friends and family. In tears, he tells his wife Irene that she is allowed "one cosmic I-Told-You-So".

=== The Millennium ===
In the Millennial Kingdom, Rayford and Irene lead a missionary trip to Egypt to share the gospel with undecideds. During the trip, he is captured by a pocket of resistance calling itself The Other Light, a Luciferian organization that denies the existence of God. While incarcerated, Rayford helps lead a young woman in TOL named Rehema to salvation. Hours later, an angel appears inside the prison and leads the captives to freedom.

As a natural, Rayford slowly ages over the course of the Millennium, becoming a senile old man. Over time, he becomes a grandfather many times over through his grandson, Kenny Bruce, and Kenny's wife, Ekaterina Risto. Near the end of the Millennium, he and the rest of the Trib Force gather for Mac's thousandth birthday party. Rayford is present at the final battle of the Millennium, watching with the rest of his friends from Cameron's estate. Jesus destroys the armies of Satan and spirits the entire human race into the heavens for the White Throne Judgement. Rayford and the rest of the believers are then welcomed into heaven.

== In other media ==
In the film Left Behind: The Movie and its sequels, Rayford is portrayed by actor Brad Johnson. However, while the main male character in the novels (indeed, serving as the leader of the Tribulation Force), his role in the film series has him downplayed to a supporting role, with Cameron "Buck" Williams taking over the leadership role Rayford held in the novels. In the 2014 remake of Left Behind, Rayford Steele is portrayed by Nicolas Cage. Kevin Sorbo portrays Steele in the film Left Behind: Rise of the Antichrist.

== Critical reception ==
Rayford Steele is the primary protagonist in the Left Behind series. He is, at the outset, an example of the worldly man stock character that is common in rapture fiction. The worldly man character is normally a generally good person, but has less interest in Christianity than he does in sex or some other pleasure. This aspect of Rayford's character is displayed by the potential affair he contemplates with Hattie Durham at the beginning of the first novel. The worldly man is also normally married to a Christian woman whose disappearance in the rapture convinces the man to become a Christian. This is exactly Rayford's experience. Nonetheless, the authors' construction of Rayford also runs counter to much of the rapture fiction tradition in that he is a member of the elite. In most rapture fiction, the Christians are lower-class and lack influence; most of the world consider them to be backwards and of no importance. In Left Behind, however, Rayford is a very prestigious pilot who is so prominent that even the President of the United States knows his name. One critic has argued that Rayford's eventual lack of forwardness in pursuing his second wife, Amanda White, is unrealistic and an example of boastful, conservative prudery on the part of the authors.
