= Chloe Steele =

Fictional character

- Left Behind character
- First appearance: Left Behind
- Last appearance: Kingdom Come
- Created by: Tim LaHaye and Jerry B. Jenkins
- Portrayed by: Janaya Stephens (2000-2005); Cassi Thomson (2014); Sarah Fisher (2022)

In-universe information
- Nickname: Chlo
- Gender: Female
- Spouse: Cameron "Buck" Williams
- Children: Kenneth Bruce Williams (son, with Buck)
- Relatives: Rayford Steele (father); Irene Steele (mother); Raymie Steele (brother)
- Religion: Christian
- Nationality: American, Italian

Chloe Steele is a fictional character from the Left Behind series of novels by Tim LaHaye and Jerry B. Jenkins. Chloe was a junior at Stanford University in Palo Alto, California, during the vanishing of millions of people during the Rapture.

== Character overview ==
Years before the Rapture, Chloe's mother, Irene Steele, begins attending a new church and claimed to have become a born again believer in Christ. Irene tells Chloe she believed that one day soon God would take His people to Heaven in the "blink of an eye." Chloe often detests going home for this reason, and she and her mother slowly grow apart, though she develops a certain kinship with her father as are both negative about their family's new interest in religion. Irene's obsession is only enhanced when Chloe comes home drunk, as Irene becomes worried about the fate of her daughter's soul. When Chloe goes off to college, she breaks nearly all ties with her family, hardly ever visiting except on holidays.

After disappearances of both her mother and younger brother, Chloe Steele was forced to decide for herself what had happened. Chloe and her father, Rayford Steele, soon turned to her mother's church for answers. After discovering most of the congregation had been taken in the vanishings, Chloe and her father meet Bruce Barnes, an associate pastor who had been left behind. She is also very good friends with Hattie Durham.

Chloe eventually strikes up a friendship with legendary magazine writer Cameron "Buck" Williams. They marry and have a son, Kenneth Bruce. Chloe becomes CEO of the International Commodity Co-op, arranging for Christians worldwide to be able to purchase food, goods, and services (after Nicolae Carpathia, Antichrist and potentate of the Global Community, had ordered the application of the Mark of the Beast, it had become impossible for Christians to buy or sell anything since they would not take the Mark).

In Armageddon, Chloe is drawn out of the bunker that she, Buck, Ray, and around 200 other believers are hiding in located in San Diego, California. As she leaves to investigate a GC Armoured Personnel Carrier she spots 2-3 platoons of GC peacekeepers and takes off away from the bunker. After dropping her ski mask and Uzi she is caught by Global Community personnel and taken into custody. She is imprisoned in a small cell in the basement of the GCHQ in San Diego. Later, she is taken east via airplane to a large prison and executed by a loyalty enforcement facilitator. She, along with other Tribulation martyrs, returns with Jesus Christ at his Glorious Appearing.

== In other media ==
Chloe is portrayed by Janaya Stephens in Left Behind: The Movie and its sequels, by Cassi Thomson in the 2014 remake of Left Behind, and by Sarah Fisher in the upcoming film Left Behind: Rise of the Anti-Christ.

== Critical reception ==
One critic has argued that the central problem of the first novel in the Left Behind series is submission and that Chloe Steele is a clear example of a submissive woman, both in her role as Rayford's daughter and in her lack of employment. Another critic has suggested that the authors' desire for evangelical, countercultural business networking is expressed through Chloe's eventual facilitation of an international commodity co-op network that will allow Christians to survive without needing to participate in the antichrist-run economy that requires the taking of the mark of the beast. Chloe's co-op has also been read as an allusion to agrarian reform in the United States, thereby endorsing populism. Critic Jonathan Vincent has denigrated Chloe as a guerrilla fighter who carries out retribution on her enemies. Vincent asserts that Chloe's transition into this kind of violence is depicted in a positive manner by the novels' authors.
