= Christian High School (San Diego) =

Private school in California, United States

Coordinates: 32°47′56″N 116°54′10″W

Information
- Established: 1965; 61 years ago
- Founders: Beverly LaHaye; Tim LaHaye
- Website: christianunified.org

Christian High School is a private Christian TK-12 school in El Cajon, California, United States. It is part of the Christian Unified Schools of San Diego. It offers a college preparatory education, with the goal to "prepare students who are academically and spiritually prepared to be a light in their community and who understand the nature of God, His Word, and the importance of impacting the world for Christ." Christian High was founded by Dr. Timothy and Beverly LaHaye in 1965.

In the first year, 1965–66, the school included grades 9-11. The school's principal was Guy East, a missionary with Wycliffe bible translators who was from Scott Memorial Baptist Church, the sponsoring church. He was in the country while on furlough. The principal from 1966 to 1972 was Pete Steveson. During that period, grades 7-8 and 12 were added. The first graduating class in 1967 included sixteen seniors. In those early years, the school grew from 32 to 330 students. The school began to participate in interscholastic sports with other schools in the area. Over that time, the school added football, basketball, track, baseball, and cross country.

== Sports ==
Students compete within the CIF league in 18 sports. Current sports include:

- Boys': football, cross country, soccer, basketball, baseball, track, golf, tennis, swim, wrestling, volleyball
- Girls': volleyball, tennis, cross country, soccer, basketball, softball, track, golf, and swim

== Controversy ==
Former Christian High School teacher Dustin Sniff was arrested in 2019 on multiple counts of sex crimes against minors. Two of the six known victims were students at Christian High School while Sniff was employed there. The victims' ages ranged from 16 to 22, and the incidences spanned from 2007 through 2017. San Diego Sheriff's Lt. Chad Boudreau said that none of the crimes had occurred on campus. In 2022, Sniff was sentenced to 21 years in federal prison.

== Achievements ==
- 1990 Media Player of the Year (basketball): Tony Clark
- January 7, 1991: CIF Boys' Soccer Division IV runner-ups after losing 4-2 to Bishop's in the CIF final
- March 11, 1999: CIF Boys' Basketball Division 5 COF champions

== Location ==
The school campus is located at 2100 Greenfield Drive, El Cajon, California, 92019. The campus is shared by other related institutions such as Shadow Mountain Community Church and San Diego Christian College.

== Notable alumni ==
- Jordyn Bugg (2024), NWSL soccer player
- Tony Clark (1990), former MLB All-Star outfielder, executive director of the Major League Baseball Players Association
- Josh Cox (1993), long-distance runner and former American record holder in the 50k
- Daniel Jeremiah (1995), NFL Network analyst and former NFL scout
- Cody Poteet (2012), pitcher for the Baltimore Orioles
- Jeff Robinson (1979), former MLB pitcher
- Kobe Sanders (2020), basketball player for the Los Angeles Clippers
- Kyle Stowers (2016), outfielder for the Miami Marlins
