= Accelerated Christian Education =

Evangelist Christian education organization

- Formation: 1970; 56 years ago
- Type: Christian education
- Headquarters: Hendersonville, Tennessee, U.S.
- Members: Worldwide
- Official language: English, Spanish, Filipino (Philippines only), Afrikaans (South Africa only)
- President and CEO: Mr. Duane Howard
- Website: aceschooloftommorow.com

Accelerated Christian Education (also known as School of Tomorrow) is an American company which produces the Accelerated Christian Education (ACE, styled by the company as A.C.E.) school curriculum structured and based around a literal interpretation of the Bible and which teaches other academic subjects from a Protestant fundamentalist or conservative evangelical standpoint. Founded in 1970 by Donald Ray Howard and Esther Hilte Howard, ACE's website states it is used in over 6,000 schools in 145 countries.

ACE has been criticized for its content, heavy reliance on the use of rote recall as a learning tool and for the educational outcomes of pupils on leaving the system both in the US and the United Kingdom. The ACE curriculum does not meet national and state standards such as the National Science Education Standards (NSES), because it does not support basic skills for critical thought and scientific literacy. The ACE curriculum explicitly denies evolution, that human agency is affecting climate, and that climate change is occurring. It focuses on conservative Christian beliefs and values, presenting those who reject creationism as immoral. Critics of ACE argue that students are placed at an educational disadvantage due to the material and methods of the curriculum.

== History ==
Accelerated Christian Education was founded in 1970 by fundamentalist Baptist minister Donald Ray Howard, a graduate of Bob Jones University. and his wife Esther Hilte Howard. They set about developing a biblically literalist educational curriculum. The first school which used the ACE program opened in Garland, Texas in 1973 and started with 45 students. By 1980 there were over 3,000 Christian schools in the United States associated with ACE. ACE reported that 8,000 schools were using by the 1980s. Subsequent numbers decreased: in a 1999 brochure ACE reported 7,000 schools, and by 2013, 6,000.

Donald Howard travelled actively to promote ACE schools in the United States and around the world as a new form of "educational mission". Expansion into Australia began in 1976 and peaked in the 1980s. ACE schools have also been established in the United Kingdom, Northern Ireland, Europe, and elsewhere. ACE has also focused on the homeschooling market.

In 1986, ACE opened a three-story facility in Lewisville, Texas, to handle its growing operations. Esther Howard took over control of ACE the following year. J. Duane Howard, one of the couple's sons, is CEO. In 2007, ACE moved its corporate offices to Madison, Tennessee, eventually moving to Hendersonville, Tennessee in 2014. The Lewisville facility remained as ACE's distribution center until it was closed at an unknown date, and a liquidation company held a sale of remaining office items in August 2026.

== Curriculum approach ==
According to the curriculum section on its website, ACE's "core curriculum is an individualized, Biblically based, character-building curriculum package" and is based on a series of workbooks called PACEs (Packets of Accelerated Christian Education). Children learn using materials based on their level of understanding, not based on their age or chronological grade level and do not progress until they learn the content. A new student is given a diagnostic test, which places the student at appropriate levels by subject.

The curriculum consists of videos, computer software and PACEs. Each subject has 12 PACEs per level, with students completing at least 70 PACEs per academic year. There are 156 PACEs from preschool to Level 12 for each core subject, except math, Literature and Creative Writing, and Word Building.

At the beginning of each PACE is an overview of the learning objectives, a scripture to memorize, a character trait to strive toward, and information on what, if any, supplies the student will need. Students are required to set daily goals for work completion, score PACE goals correctly and completely, and are generally expected to complete a PACE within two to three weeks (depending on the school).

The PACEs also contain short comic-based stories which attempt to teach proper character, centered around young children (who age-progress throughout the PACEs) with names similar to the convention used in The Pilgrim's Progress. The main characters are Ace (pronounced Ay-cee) Virtueson and Christi Lovejoy (the protagonists portrayed as positive role models), and Susie Selfwill and Ronny Vain (the antagonists portrayed as negative role models), with others who can be positive or negative depending on the story.

=== Subjects ===
Each subject is color-coded, with twelve PACEs per level, and twelve levels per core subject, except Word Building (9 Levels) and Literature and Creative Writing (which begins with Level 2 and concludes with Level 8 as these two are already integrated in English PACEs ranging from 1097 to 1144).

The core subjects of ACE are mathematics (yellow), English (red), Literature (and Creative Writing) (burgundy), Word Building/Etymology (purple), science (blue), and social studies (green). Students in the Philippines (under School of Tomorrow Philippines) also study Araling Panlipunan (brown) and Filipino (pink). Its educational approach uses phonics to teach reading.

=== Examinations and progress ===
ACE's curriculum website states that curriculum progression is flexible, with students proceeding at their own pace. Students are given review exercises at certain points in a PACE (Checkups) and a test at its culmination (Self Test). Supervisors do not answer PACE questions nor do they give the answer, but guide students and encourage them to find the answer on their own. Should material in some PACE subjects be challenging, supervisors may need to adjust the students' goals accordingly. The passing score for the PACE Test can be from 80% to 90%, also depending on the corresponding school.

Students fail if they commit minor or major scoring violations (for example, a 100% on all three Checkups and the Self Test, and a 42% on the PACE Test) or rush through PACE content (including Tests) with little or no accuracy. Students are then mandated to take appropriate measures to pass the failed PACE subject. This varies depending on the school, and may require repeating both the Self Test and PACE Test, just the PACE Test, or the entire PACE.

== Issues ==
=== Use of rote recall ===
The curriculum's emphasis on rote recall has been criticized by educational researchers. David Berliner described the teaching methods as "low-level cognitive tasks that emphasize simple association and recall activities, as is typical of instruction from workbooks... the materials make heavy use of behavioral objectives, programmed learning, and rewards." D. Fleming and T Hunt in a 1987 article in the education journal Phi Delta Kappa analyzed the ACE curriculum, concluding that "If parents want their children to obtain a very limited and sometimes inaccurate view of the world — one that ignores thinking above the level of rote recall — then the ACE materials do the job very well. The world of the ACE materials is quite a different one from that of scholarship and critical thinking."

=== Race and apartheid ===
The ACE curriculum has been accused by some to promote racist stereotypes. One workbook included the following passage:

Although apartheid appears to allow the unfair treatment of blacks, the system has worked well in South Africa .... Although white businessmen and developers are guilty of some unfair treatment of blacks, they turned South Africa into a modern industrialized nation, which the poor, uneducated blacks couldn't have accomplished in several more decades. If more blacks were suddenly given control of the nation, its economy and business, as Mandela wished, they could have destroyed what they have waited and worked so hard for.

In addition, the curriculum has been criticized for its depiction of racially segregated churches and schools. It has been argued that ACE is not a suitable recipient for national educational funding.

=== Content ===
The ACE curriculum has furthermore been accused by some experts to give religious explanations of natural phenomena rather than scientific ones. It explicitly denies evolution, the effects of human actions on climate, and that climate change is occurring. Science is presented in the ACE curriculum through the framework of Young Earth Creationism (YEC). For example, the existence of the Loch Ness monster is presented as a fact (as a plesiosaur), and used as a so-called proof against the scientific theory of evolution. Textbooks published in Europe removed the Loch Ness monster reference in July 2013, but children are still only taught creationism as an explanation for the origin of life on earth.

Textbooks used in the curriculum assert that abortion is wrong, evolution is false, and homosexuality is a choice. They teach that wives must be submissive to their husbands, women's liberation leads to child neglect and that one can avoid AIDS by being abstinent until marriage.

The ACE curriculum in "Science 1096" asserts that solar fusion is a myth, describing it as "an invention of evolution scientists."

As of January 2017, there are 26 schools using the ACE curriculum registered in the United Kingdom. In October 2016, ten schools graded by British parliamentary education inspectors OFSTED were revisited following concerns of mistreatment raised in British press, nine of which were subsequently re-graded as 'inadequate' or 'requires improvement' by the watchdog. In 2018, a further ACE school in London was rated 'inadequate' for failing to teach adequate science and for not teaching children to ″develop the skills to collect and evaluate scientific evidence."

=== Educational outcomes ===
In 2017, research into the International Certificate of Christian Education, the school-leaving qualification provided by ACE in the UK, claimed that it failed to prepare students for university level education. Professor Michael Reiss of University of London stated "My particular problem with ACE is the awful nature of the curriculum they provide to their students." Studies by Scaramanga and Reiss state that the curriculum fails students as it is heavily based around memorizing information rather than analyzing and understanding it. This rote-learning emphasis fails to support "development of science skills, the powers of critical thought, and basic scientific literacy and numeracy". The ACE curriculum, across multiple versions, continues to put students at a ‘cognitive and conceptual disadvantage.’

Having researched comparative performance on the American College Test between public school students from one school and ACE students from another private school in the same geographic area, one college student wrote in her thesis in 2005 that "a significant difference was found between the public school graduates' scores and the ACE graduates' scores in all areas of the ACT (English, Math, Reading, and Composite Score), except the area of Science Reasoning. Overall, the ACT scores of the ACE graduates were consistently lower than those of the public school students." The author also noted that "the current study did not account for variables such as socioeconomic status, ethnicity, gender, or parent's level of education. These variables may impact ACT scores and therefore need to be considered in future research," nor was demographic information of the public school used for comparison. Furthermore, the sample size of graduates from ACE was disproportionately small in this analysis.

In April 2019, the University of South Africa warned that applicants who completed their Grade 12 or equivalent using the ACE (Accelerated Christian Education) School of Tomorrow curriculum may not meet the admission criteria.

== Distribution and promotion ==
Schools using the curriculum are not allowed to describe themselves as "ACE schools" or use the ACE (or SOT) logo although schools are expected to sign an agreement and follow the ACE Procedures Manual and Administration Manual.

The program is intended for homeschooling and private establishments; ACE provides instruction and structure for operating a "Christian school". ACE's website advises that schools are not required to use the entire curriculum and may augment it with other resources, although this incurs a financial penalty as the school loses its discount.

The company also sells home schooling and distance learning curriculum materials through its Lighthouse Christian Academy (LCA).

ACE provides annual one-day training sessions called Christian Educators' Conventions (CEC) for administrators, supervisors, and monitors. These are provided in locations around the United States. There are also week-long sessions provided for additional training for monitors, supervisors, and other administrative positions. The sessions focus on understanding and properly implementing the ACE program. For Learning Center Supervisors a four-day workshop is provided annually. The workshop is organized like an ACE classroom, allowing the supervisor to experience the ACE system as a student and learn how to implement the system.

=== ACE student conventions ===
Schools that use the ACE curriculum may participate in the Regional Student Conventions. and the top-placed participants are able to proceed to the International Student Convention. This convention is usually held at a university campus, such as Rutgers University (1988), the University of North Texas in Denton (1989 and 1992), Northern Arizona University (1990), Indiana University (1991), and Purdue University (1994). International Student Conventions have also been held at Western Kentucky University (2010) with about 2,500 students, James Madison University (2011), with 3,000 attending, and New Mexico State University (2015), with 2,500 participants. They have since returned to IUP for a convention in 2022, which held upwards of 1,000 students. The All Africa Student Convention takes place in South Africa once a year at the University of the Free State in Bloemfontein, South Africa. The All Africa Student Convention is not organized or hosted by ACE United States but by Accelerated Christian Education South Africa, which is a separate organization providing the ACE curriculum to African schools.

The conventions also offer "Events of the Heart", which allow students with mental and physical disabilities to participate. When the conventions first started, a parade in the hosting city would accompany a convention. In 1981, over 3,000 students and sponsors marched in New York City to celebrate the opening of the convention at Rutgers University. Student conventions offer speakers; past speakers have included David Gibbs from the Christian Law Association, Ben Jordan, Tim LaHaye and Beverly LaHaye, and William Murray.

== See also ==
- Responsive Education Solutions
