= Concerned Women for America =

American legislative action committee

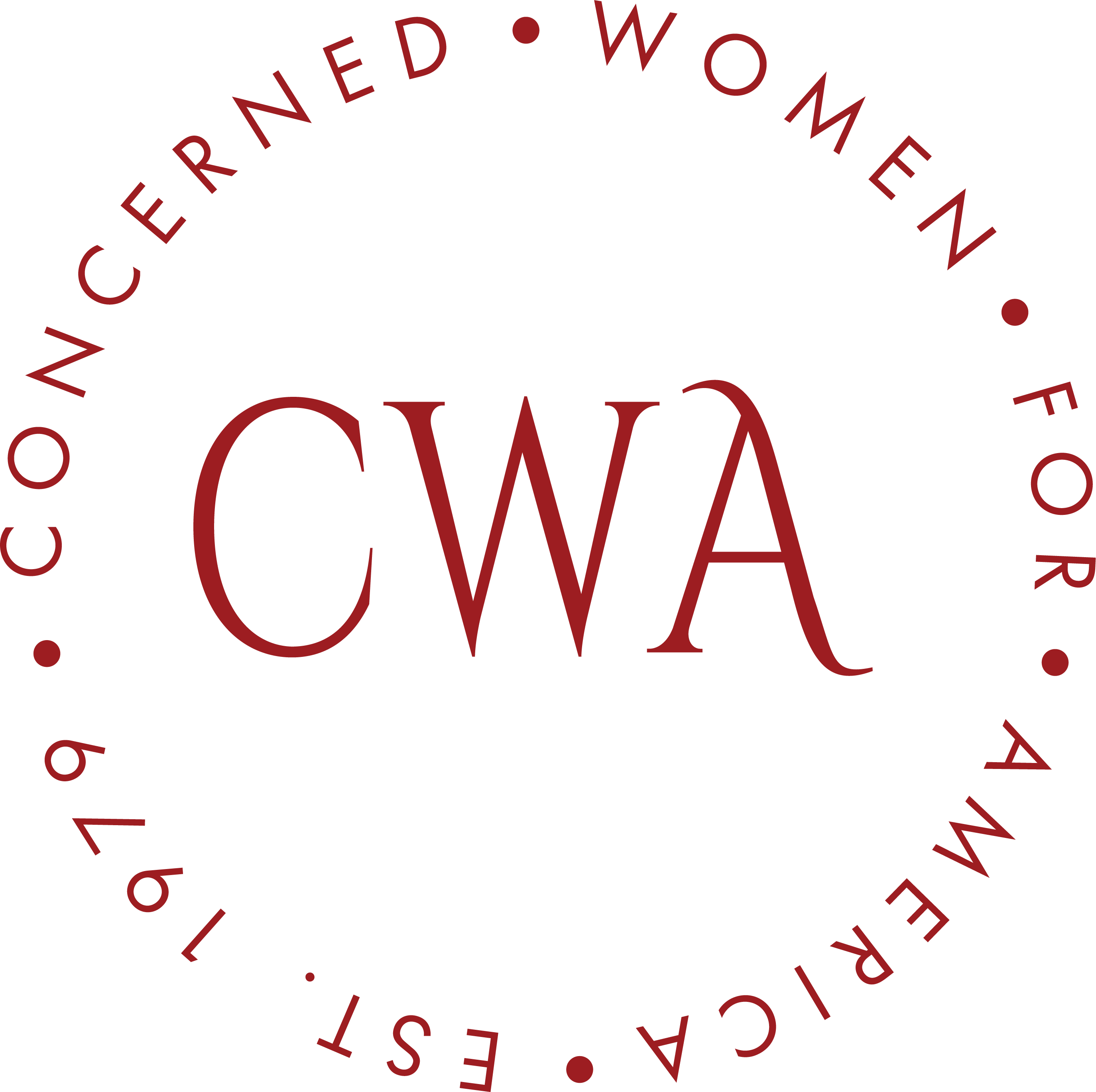
- Concerned Women for America's logo
- Formation: 1978
- CEO and President: Penny Young Nance
- Website: concernedwomen.org

Concerned Women for America (CWA) is a socially conservative, evangelical non-profit women's legislative action committee in the United States. Headquartered in Washington D.C., the CWA is involved in social and political movements, through which it aims to incorporate Christian ideology. The group was founded in San Diego, California, in 1978, by Beverly LaHaye, whose husband Timothy LaHaye was an evangelical Christian minister and author of The Battle for the Mind, as well as coauthor of the Left Behind series. The CWA identifies itself as an amalgam of "policy experts and ... activists[s]" with an anti-feminist approach to politics.

== Formation ==
Concerned Women for America is part of a movement known as the New Christian Right. Organized in reaction to the establishment of its liberal counterpart, the National Organization for Women; the growing dispute over traditional gender roles; and the rising discussion of the Equal Rights Amendment (ERA), the CWA set out to "fight policies that it believe[d] [to] disrupt traditional gender roles and norms." Fueling its formation, an interview between Barbara Walters and Betty Friedan, a prominent feminist activist, gained public attention in 1978 regarding women's issues. In the interview, Friedan claimed to speak for American women. Beverly LaHaye did not believe that Betty Friedan was speaking for the majority of women because feminist views were, according to LaHaye, anti-God and anti-family.

In regards to the interview, LaHaye stated that she was convinced Friedan's goal was a "misguided attempt to dismantle the bedrock of American culture: the family", and that she believed Christian women were not included in discussions of women's rights. In this regard, the "concern" that the CWA had behind the name of the group was in response to the worries that feminism would "ruin" America. Such fears and opposition to much of the Democratic Party's ideology during this era led Beverly LaHaye to host a series of conventions and rallies in San Diego, resulting in Concerned Women for America's formation. As a result, the CWA became known as "the largest women's organization of the Christian Right during the 1980s and 1990s." The CWA began with local prayer chapters mobilized around issues such as the ERA and legalized abortion. In 1987, the CWA relocated from San Diego, California to Washington, DC, at which time it formally established a national office and a national presence.

== Issues ==
The CWA identifies itself as an organization in opposition to feminism that speaks for evangelical women who feel that the national feminist movement does not support their interests. The CWA has taken strong conservative stances on several highly debated matters. The CWA has publicly stated its opposition to issues such as abortion, sex education, same-sex marriage, euthanasia, embryonic stem cell research, needle exchange programs, pornography, cloning, drug abuse, secular education, gambling, or any other efforts which "intervene with natural human life". The organization's stance on contraception is not as clear, however, for members' opinions on this topic vary widely. The only definite statement the CWA has put forth in regards to contraception is that its stance, as a whole, is ambiguous, but that "many Catholic women follow the church's teaching on the use of contraceptives." The CWA focuses on promoting its conservative, Christian-based ideology through seven "core issues".

=== Abortion ===
A few years prior to the organization's founding, the Supreme Court released its decisions regarding Roe v. Wade and Doe v. Bolton, which granted women the right to attain an abortion, and disbanded all state laws restricting such action. Because many of the CWA's members were supporters of the Right to Life movement and strongly opposed these rulings, Concerned Women for America is recognized as an anti-abortion organization. At the time of its founding, the CWA, along with similar organizations which spawned during this era, identified itself as part of the "pro-family movement," arguing that abortion defied both Christian morality and traditional family values.

The CWA was a proponent of the welfare revisions set out by the 1994 "Contract with America", which aimed to reduce the frequency and acceptance of illegitimate (out of wedlock) births. These revisions suggested (1) incentivizing states to "reduce illegitimate births without...increas[ing] abortions" by way of block grants; (2) denying monetary assistance to "children born to unmarried minor mothers;" and (3) establishing a "family cap" in which unwed mothers could only be compensated for one child, all of which the CWA supported due to its strong opposition to abortion and its defense of the traditional family, as discussed below.

Currently, the CWA strives to inform the public of the harm it claims that abortion has on men, women and their families. The CWA began using the common anti-abortion movement's rhetoric of protecting women and their health in the mid-1990s, as a way to promote interest in the anti-abortion movement. The CWA lobbies for defunding domestic and international family planning programs, especially those that perform abortions or provide Norplant. The CWA supports crisis pregnancy centers and post-abortion counseling services. The CWA opposes emergency contraception, such as Plan B, on the grounds that it "blurs the line" between contraception and abortion.

=== Marriage ===
As a supporter of traditional gender roles and the nuclear family, the CWA publicly defends western familialism and the subservience of women. As such, the CWA is a supporter of the sanctity of marriage and reproduction, and strongly opposes divorce. Regarding the defense of the family, the CWA was a latecomer to the opposition of the ERA. The CWA believes that women's place is in the home; therefore, the rights set forth by the ERA threatened the traditional nuclear family. The CWA built a national network of prayer chains in opposition to the ERA. The CWA was a supporter of the Defense of Marriage Act as DOMA declared homosexual marriages to be illegal, thus supporting the CWA's ideals of both heterosexuality and marriage.

The CWA believes it is a Christian's duty to start a family, explaining their general disapproval of those who do not wish to have children. More specifically, these familial ideals tie into the CWA's understanding of women and motherhood; as expressed by founder Beverly LaHaye, women have a "natural" desire to be mothers, leading to the organization's encouragement of women's domesticity through stay-at-home motherhood. The CWA opposed the 1988 Act for Better Child Care (H.R. 3660), which would have provided government-sponsored child care for families in which both parents are working. The CWA also testified against the Family and Medical Leave Act of 1993 on the premise that it was biased against those who could not afford to take leave.

In support of these ideals, the CWA opposes pornography, believing that consumption of such media can disrupt traditional family values, as well as promote domestic violence. More specifically, the CWA "contends that pornography persuades men to demean their wives, to ruin their marriages, and to engage in illicit sexual behaviors". In addition, the CWA claims that the proliferation of and lack of regulation for pornography promotes gay rights and premarital sex, both of which it strongly opposes.

=== Religious education in public schools ===
Being a Christian organization, the CWA is known to promote Christian teachings in schools. The CWA believes that they must defend "God's truth," and to do so, they advocate against "secular humanist" teachings and influence in public education. It is for these reasons that the CWA initially gained recognition as a public policy organization, for it publicly opposed the U.S. Supreme Court's rulings in 1962 and 1963, which banned religious teachings and practices, such as prayers and Bible readings, in public schools.

To provide a more historical context of the organization's educational efforts, in 1983, the CWA's desire for a combination of fundamental and religious teachings was concretely displayed through a lawsuit, known today as Mozert v. Hawkins County Board of Education, which arose between parents (members of the CWA) and a local Tennessee school board. The case began when a local mother, Vicki Frost, reprimanded the administration at her daughter's school for providing students with books that discussed evolution, feminism, and telepathy, which she contended "could turn children away from God."

The dispute quickly escalated as a group of likeminded parents joined Frost and filed a federal lawsuit, resulting in the CWA's public support against the school and People for the American Way, one of its many liberal counterparts. Fearing the growth of the "Religious New Right", the CWA claimed that students should have the right to freely exercise their religion, parents should have a voice in their child's education, and there should be greater control over schools as a whole, arguments which gained favor in the trial court in 1986. To the CWA's dismay, however, U.S. Court of Appeals for the Sixth Circuit reversed this decision in 1987.

The CWA believes that sex education should not be taught in school, and that parents should be empowered to teach their own children about sex. However, they also concede that if it is taught in school, then it needs to be abstinence-only sex education. Many "sexual conservatives," as Lisa McGirr refers to them in her research regarding sex education, have relied on the CWA to help them implement such ideology into the development or modification of sex education programs in schools, as well as to provide educational speakers.

CWA supports teaching intelligent design in public schools and advocates school prayer, saying in a 1988 book titled America: To Pray or Not To Pray?, that since the Engel v. Vitale Supreme Court case of 1962 outlawed government-directed prayer, morality has declined in public schools and in society in general. As described above, the CWA aided the plaintiff in the 1983 case Mozert v. Hawkins, by arguing it is unconstitutional for public schools to require reading material that conflicts with the religious values of parents.

In similar fashion to the Mozert case, the CWA was recognized for its support of Nathan Bishop Middle School and the Providence, Rhode Island school district in the 1992 Lee v. Weisman case. Contrary to Mozert v. Hawkins, in which the CWA protested against the school's nonsecular teaching, Lee v. Weisman resulted in support from conservative Christian organizations, such as the CWA, who fought to defend the maintenance of religious practices in public schools, such as prayer at graduation. Along with its support of the welfare revisions in the Contract with America, the CWA advocated for other amendments, such as the reinstitution of state-sponsored school prayer and "the eligibility of religious programs for public funding."

=== United Nations ===
The CWA originally opposed U.S. involvement in the United Nations, but have since accepted the UN and instead focus on the alleged dangers of conferences and treaties. The CWA has more influence in international affairs than many other conservative organizations because they are active in the UN. The CWA opposed CEDAW, The Convention on the Elimination of all Forms of Discrimination Against Women, which was adopted by the UN in 1979. They view CEDAW as a tool to undermine the traditional family and guarantee global abortion and prostitution. Similarly, the CWA sees the CRC (the Convention on the Rights of the Child) as a way for globalists, working through the UN, to "sever children from their families and religious communities", as described by authors Buss and Didi.

=== Sexual exploitation ===
The CWA believes that men becoming addicted to pornography leads to the exploitation and victimization of women. In addition to pornography, the CWA opposes prostitution. The CWA believes that legalizing prostitution would increase sex trafficking, not decrease it as other organizations have proposed.

The CWA has been actively involved in the prevention of sex trafficking; working closely with the National Organization for Women, the Family Research Council, Catholics for a Free Choice, Gloria Steinem, and Chuck Colson, the CWA has increased awareness of this issue, and was a major contributor in the establishment of The Trafficking Victims Protection Act (TVPA) in 2000.

In response to Google and Mozilla's plans to test a standard which would encrypt the Domain Name System, which could possibly impede internet surveillance by law enforcement, a CWA spokesperson said "We believe it is important for all stakeholders in the internet ecosystem to work together to ensure that encrypted DNS does not lead to unintended consequences that harm our children."

=== Support for Israel ===
On May 8, 2013, the CWA's board of directors voted unanimously to include support for Israel as part of its core mission. CWA says it would support "laws and policies that strengthen the ties between Israel and the U.S." and the policies "enacted by our State Department, Department of Defense and others that encourage the development of our relationship with Israel." Penny Nance said that support from CWA's founder, Beverly LaHaye, was the biggest driver behind the group formalizing its support for Israel. This relationship is backed by a long history of conservative Christians' support for Israel.

=== Project 2025 ===
CWA is a member of the advisory board of Project 2025, a collection of conservative and right-wing policy proposals from The Heritage Foundation to reshape the United States federal government and consolidate executive power should the Republican nominee win the 2024 presidential election.

== Leadership ==
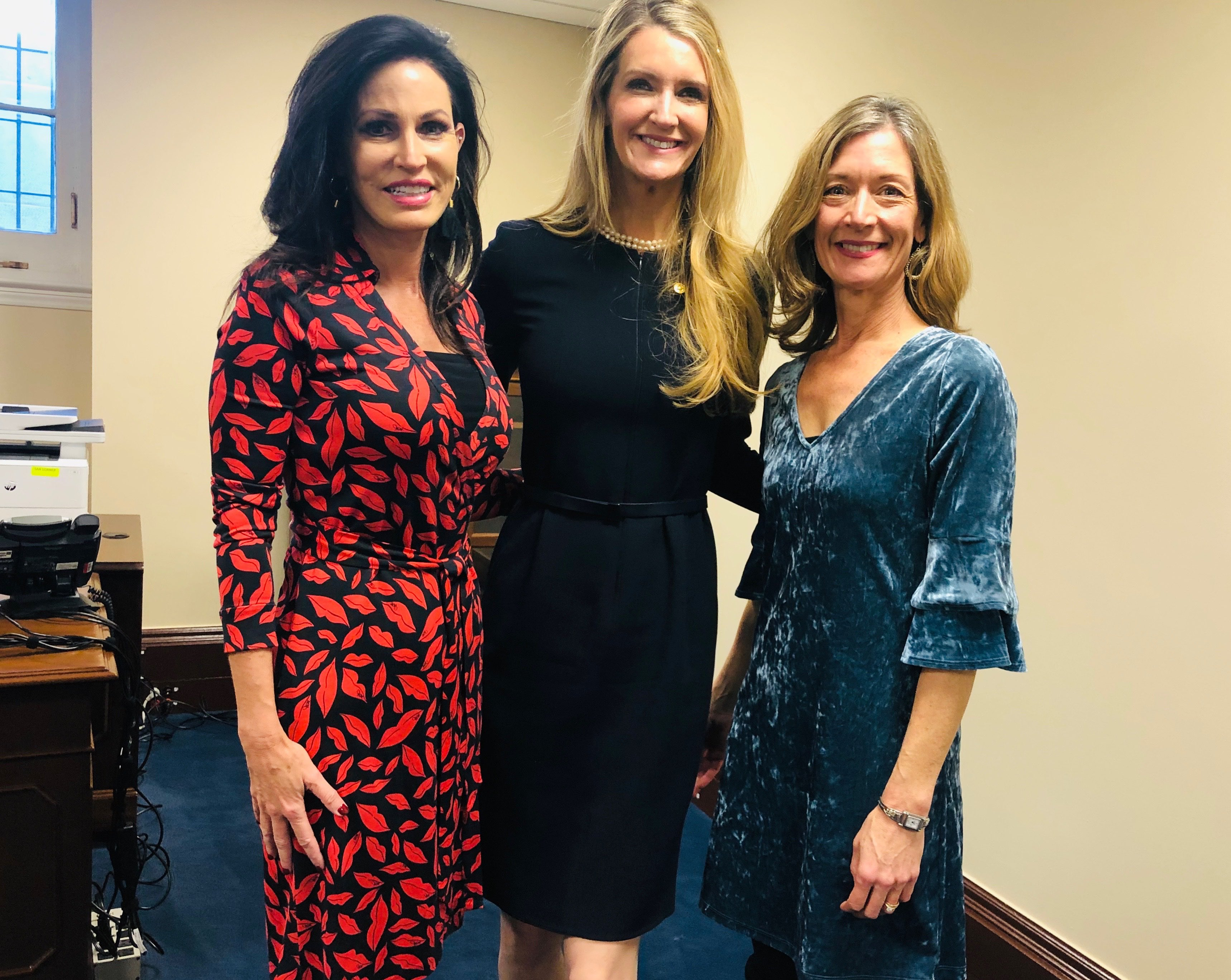
Penny Nance (left) with Kelly Loeffler in 2020

=== President or CEO ===
- Beverly LaHaye, president 1979–2006
- Wendy Wright, president 2006–2013
- Penny Young Nance, CEO (2010–2013) and president 2013–present
  - Nance was previously a Federal Communications Commission advisor on children's social and media concerns.

== Working through the media ==
In the late 1990s, the CWA garnered attention by way of its midday broadcasts on KFAX, a San Francisco-based Christian radio station. These broadcasts often featured Beverly LaHaye Live, a popular talk-show segment which spoke about the CWA's mission, morals, and aspirations for society. Today, the CWA continues to produce a daily radio show; however, it is now entitled Concerned Women Today, and focuses primarily on calling members and other listeners to action by encouraging them to lobby senators. The CWA publishes a monthly magazine called Family Voice, which chronicles their current events as well as ways in which members can become more involved with the organization.

== Beverly LaHaye Institute ==
The Beverly LaHaye Institute (BLI), named for the CWA founder, is the research arm of the CWA. BLI is considered one of the CWA's official think tanks. The BLI has a variety of research style essays and briefs that cover a wide variety of topics the CWA is interested in, most of which is published or featured on the CWA website. BLI filed an amicus brief in January 2014 in Sebelius vs. Hobby Lobby. Most of the amicus briefs in the Hobby Lobby case focused on religious freedom issues. BLI's brief had a unique focus on rebutting the government's argument that the birth control mandate imposed by Affordable Care Act would improve women's health and prevent unintended pregnancies. The BLI brief rejected a clear-cut notion of "intended" and "unintended" pregnancies. BLI argued that the government's evidence, based mostly on a 2011 Institute of Medicine report, did not prove the birth control mandate would increase use rates for birth control or that unintended pregnancies harm women's health. The brief also argued against the government's claim that the mandate promotes "gender equity."

== Culture and Family Institute ==
The Culture and Family Institute is one of two of the CWA's research facilities. The Culture and Family Institute, founded in 2001, is a think tank that focuses exclusively on opposition to gay rights activism.

== See also ==
- Beverly LaHaye
- Eagle Forum
- Project Esther
- Susan B. Anthony Pro-Life America
- Women in conservatism in the United States
