= Laredo Christian Academy =

Coordinates: 27.5573°N 99.4766°W

Location
- 6100 N. Mcpherson; Laredo, Texas 78044-2837; United States

Information
- Type: Private School
- Religious affiliation: Assembly of God
- Faculty: 23
- Enrollment: 160+
- Student to teacher ratio: 5.32:1
- Colors: Red, White, Blue
- Mascot: Lion

Laredo Christian Academy was an Assemblies of God private Christian school located in Laredo, Texas. Grades Pre-K through 12th were taught in the Academy. In 2002 there were 162 students attending Laredo Christian Academy. The school closed permanently at the end of the 2002 school year. Curriculum was based on Accelerated Christian Education materials.

== History ==
Reverend Ken Robinson, then senior pastor of First Assembly of God, was first principal of Laredo Christian Academy. Sara Hanlon was the school's second principal, after serving as school secretary to Robinson. Mrs. Salinas served as the third school principal. Reverend Tony Gutierrez served as 4th principal. Cindy Morales served as its final principal.
