= Penny Young Nance =

President and CEO of Concerned Women for America

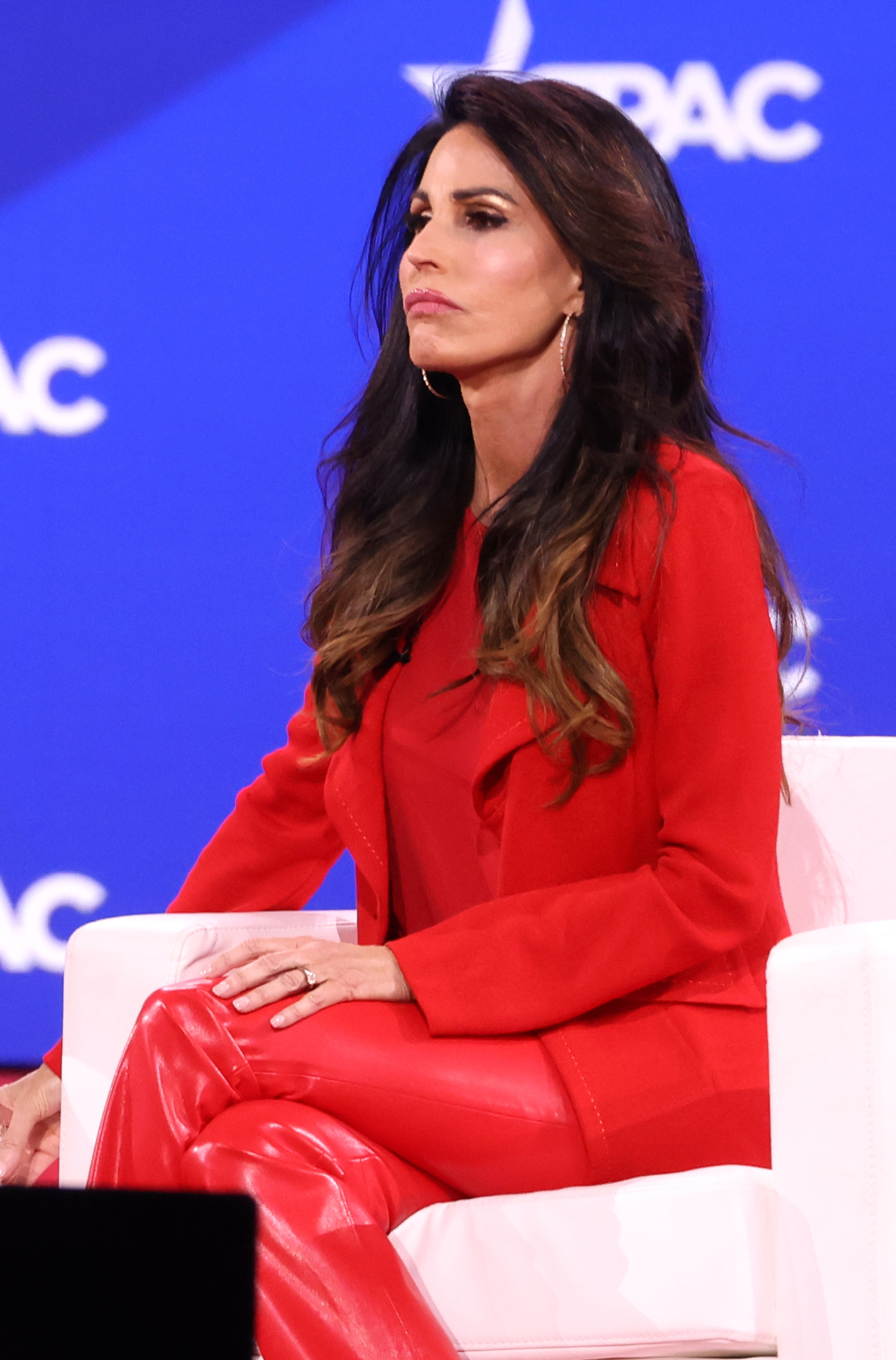
Nance in 2025

Penny Young Nance (née Penny Leah Young) is an author, public speaker and the president and CEO of Concerned Women for America, a conservative Christian organization.

== Education ==
Nance is an alumna of Liberty University, class of 1988. She has a Bachelor of Science in communications with a journalism/public relations emphasis.

== Personal life ==
Nance was born in Tennessee. Her parents are Rev. and Mrs. Edward Young. Nance is married to William Patton (Will) Nance and they have two children.

== Career ==
Nance is the current president and CEO of Concerned Women for America (CWA). She previously served as a lobbyist and legislative director for CWA. She is the former president of Nance and Associates. She has been a special advisor to the Federal Communications Commission on media and social issues. In the 1990s Nance was the fundraising chairperson for Urban Young Life in Washington DC.

== Political views ==
Nance opposes legislation that would ban workplace discrimination on the basis of sexual orientation or gender identity. She strongly supports the State of Israel.

== Honors ==
In 2013, Nance was named one of the "4 most powerful pro-life female voices" by The Christian Post In 2016, Nance was awarded an honorary doctorate in Humanities by Liberty University.

== Books ==
Nance is the author of the book “Feisty and Feminine: A Rallying Cry for Conservative Women".
