= Ed Hindson =

American evangelist (1944–2022)

Edward Hindson (December 21, 1944 – July 2, 2022) was an American Christian evangelist and host of The King Is Coming, a syndicated television broadcast shown across the United States. A dispensationalist, Hindson wrote more than twenty books that deal with Bible prophecy and the imminent return of Jesus. He was a professor of Old Testament studies and eschatology at Liberty University in Lynchburg, Virginia, and a frequent speaker on prophecy.

== Life and career ==
Hindson graduated from William Tyndale College in Farmington Hills, Michigan. He completed a DPhil at the University of South Africa and also held a number of other degrees which included an MA and Th.D. from Trinity Evangelical Divinity School, PhD from Durham University, Doctor of Hebrew Letters Hebrew Union College-Jewish Institute of Religion, ThM from Grace Theological Seminary and D.Min. from Westminster Theological Seminary. He began teaching at Liberty University in 1974.

His show, The King Is Coming, is aired on TBN, DayStar and other Christian television networks and stations.

Hindson was named Dean of Liberty University's School of Religion on November 20, 2013. Hindson died in 2022 while he was still a Dean.

== Works ==
=== Thesis ===
- Hindson, Ed (1967). Isaiah's Immanuel: a sign of his times or the sign of the ages? (M.A.). Trinity Evangelical Divinity School. OCLC 20660613.

=== Books ===
- ——— (1970). The Philistines and the Old Testament. Baker Studies in Biblical Archaeology. Grand Rapids, MI: Baker Book House. ISBN 9780801040344. OCLC 592415.
- ——— (1978). Isaiah's Immanuel: a sign of his times or the sign of the ages?. International library of philosophy and theology. Biblical and theological studies. Philadelphia, PA: Presbyterian and Reformed Pub. Co. ISBN 9780875523101. OCLC 4891200. - version of masters thesis
- ———; Dobson, Ed; Falwell, Jerry (1981). The Fundamentalist Phenomenon: The Resurgence of Conservative Christianity. Grand Rapids, MI: Baker Publishing Group.
- ———; Dobson, Ed (1984). Fundamentalism Today. Sewall Company.
- ———; Dobson, Ed (1988). The Seduction of Power. Grand Rapids, MI: Fleming H Revell.
- ——— (1991). End Times, the Middle East, and the New World Order. Wheaton, IL: Victor Books.
- ——— (1997). Approaching Armageddon. Eugene, OR: Harvest House Publishers.
- ——— (1998). Is the Antichrist Alive and Well?: 10 Keys to His Identity. Eugene, OR: Harvest House Publishers.
- ——— (1999). Overcoming Life's Toughest Problems. Eugene, OR: Harvest House Publishers.
- ——— (1999). Earth's Final Hour. Eugene, OR: Harvest House Publishers.
- ———; LaHaye, Tim (2001). Seduction of the Heart: how to guard and keep your heart from evil. Colorado Springs, CO: W Pub. Group. ISBN 9780849917264. OCLC 49197929.
- ——— (2003). God Is There in the Tough Times: Turning Your Disappointments into Hope. Eugene, OR: Harvest House Publishers.
- ——— (2003). Courageous Faith: Life Lessons From Old Testament Heroes. Chattanooga, TN: AMG Publishers.
- ———; LaHaye, Tim (2007). Global Warning: are we on the brink of World War III?. Eugene, OR: Harvest House Publishers. ISBN 9780736921459. OCLC 85692840.
- ——— (2014). 15 Future Events that will Shake the World. Eugene, OR: Harvest House Publishers. ISBN 9780736953085. OCLC 1023281505.
- —— (2011). Understanding revelation in one hour. Publisher not specified. ISBN 978-0-73694-7886.

=== Edited by ===
- ———, ed. (1983). King James Bible Commentary. Nashville, TN: Thomas Nelson.
- ———, ed. (1985). King James Study Bible. Nashville, TN: Thomas Nelson.

=== Journal articles ===
- ——— (1969). "Development of the Interpretation of Isaiah 7:14: A Tribute to Edward J. Young". Grace Journal. 10 (2): 19–25.
- ——— (Fall 1969). "Isaiah's Immanuel". Grace Journal. 10 (3): 3–15.
- ——— (Fall 1982). "The Inerrancy Debate and the Use of Scripture in Counseling". Grace Theological Journal. 3 (2): 207–219.
