= Ed Dobson =

Northern Irish-American pastor and author (1949–2015)

Personal details
- Born: 29 December 1949 Northern Ireland
- Died: 26 December 2015 (aged 65)
- Education: University of Virginia

Edward George Dobson (29 December 1949 – 26 December 2015) was an American minister from Northern Ireland, a founding dean of Liberty University, and an early executive at the Moral Majority. After a decade of work with Jerry Falwell he became disillusioned with Christian participation in the political process, and to spend 18 years as pastor of Calvary Church, a megachurch in Grand Rapids, Michigan. He was an author and speaker on Christian and other issues, including after being diagnosed with ALS in 2000.

== Early life ==
Born Edward George Dobson on 29 December 1949, in Northern Ireland, Dobson was a pastor's son and came to the United States in 1964 at the age of 14.

== Career ==
He became Liberty University's dean of men at age 23, later becoming vice president for student life and an associate pastor of Thomas Road Baptist Church. When Jerry Falwell started the Moral Majority in June 1979, he was on the board.

In the early 1980s he was a senior editor of Fundamentalist Journal, a new Falwell-founded publication, and he became editor-in-chief in the mid-1980s In the same time frame, Dobson and another Liberty faculty member, Ed Hindson, effectively ghost-wrote Falwell's The Fundamentalist Phenomenon.

By the late 1980s Dobson said he was disillusioned with Christian participation in the political process, and he moved away from fundamentalism toward mainstream evangelicalism. He decided that the rationale behind the Moral Majority had been wrong and that to a significant degree cultural problems could not be remedied through the political process.

In 1987 Dobson left Liberty. He was senior pastor at Calvary Church in Grand Rapids, Michigan from 1987 to 2005.

== Later life ==
Dobson was diagnosed with amyotrophic lateral sclerosis (ALS, Lou Gehrig's disease) in 2000. Dobson continued in the pastorate of Calvary Church until 2005, wrote the memoir, Prayers and Promises when Facing a Life-Threatening Illness, published by Zondervan in 2007, and served as an advisory editor for Christianity Today.

== Awards and recognition ==
In 1993, Moody Bible Institute named Dobson "Pastor of the Year". In Spring 2008, Grand Rapids Theological Seminary dedicated a "Dobson Study Center" in its classroom building to honor Dobson's long pastorate and television ministry in Grand Rapids.

== Personal life ==
Dobson lived for much of the latter part of his life in Grand Rapids, Michigan. He was married to Lorna Walker and had two sons.

A short video was made of Dobson's ALS.

Dobson died on 26 December 2015, at age 65.

=== Fundraising ===
Dobson was a Corvette enthusiast, and participated in a cross-country drive on Route 66 to raise money for ALS research, an event that drew "40 friends and a dozen Corvettes" and raised approximately $275,000.

== Further reading and viewing ==
- Vande Bunte, Matt (29 December 2015). "A Look Back at Ed Dobson's Ministry" (News-Grand Rapids). MLive.com.
- Vande Bunte, Matt (28 December 2015). "Ed Dobson, Prominent Pastor, Has Died" (News-Grand Rapids). MLive.com.
- Merica, Dan (18 February 2012). "Facing Death, A Top Pastor Rethinks What It Means To Be Christian". CNN.com. Atlanta, GA; New York, NY: CNN Belief Blog. Archived from the original on 19 February 2012 – via The Washington Post.
- Barker, Greg (writer-producer); Espar, David (producer-editor); Powell, Julie (producer); Lehmann; Frank-Peter (principal cinematography); et al.; Balmer, Randall; Prothero, Stephen; Dobson, Ed; et al. (interviewees); Scott, Campbell (narrator) (11–13 October 2010). Episode 6: Of God and Caesar (AV transcript). PBS American Experience: God in America. Washington, DC: Public Broadcasting Service (PBS). For cast and crew, see this link, and to view the Episode 6 video, see this link.
- PBS Staff & Dobson, Ed (15 October 2009). "Interview: Ed Dobson" (edited transcript). PBS.org. God in America.
- Dobson, Edward G. (Ed) (1986). An Analysis of the Environmental Perceptions of Undergraduate Students In Evangelical and Fundamentalist Bible Colleges and Liberal Arts Colleges (Ed. D. thesis). Charlottesville, VA.
