= David A. Noebel =

American religious leader and writer (born 1936)

David A. Noebel (born August 27, 1936) is an American religious leader and writer. He is the former director of Summit Ministries, in Manitou Springs, Colorado in the United States. Since the 1960s, he has written widely on the relationship between religion and popular culture, and is an outspoken critic of secular humanism, which he describes as unscientific and a religion.

Noebel was a former Associate Evangelist of Billy James Hargis's Christian Crusade. Noebel served as vice-president and president of American Christian College, which Hargis had founded in 1971 in Tulsa, Oklahoma. It closed in 1977, three years after Hargis resigned following allegations of sexual misconduct against Hargis. He was a member of the Council for National Policy beginning in 1984, and a candidate for Congress against Rep. Robert Kastenmeier.

== Life ==
Noebel was educated at the Milwaukee Bible College (now Grace Christian University), Hope College (Holland, Michigan, B.A.), and the University of Tulsa (M.A.). He studied philosophy in graduate school at the University of Wisconsin–Madison. He was ordained a minister in 1961. He was pastor of Grace Bible Church, Madison, Wisconsin.

In 1962, Noebel founded Summit Ministries, a Christian leadership training organization designed as an educational Christian ministry. It was founded on his belief that modern society is harmful to Christian youth and affects their worldview, potentially causing them to renounce their Christian faith. He directed Summit Ministries since 1964 until his retirement, when the board unanimously endorsed Jeff Myers to succeed his retirement. The ministry grew in size considerably after being mentioned on James Dobson's radio show.

In 1965, Noebel wrote a pamphlet, "Communism, Hypnotism and The Beatles." It was followed in 1966 by Rhythm, Riots, and Revolution, which added to the debate about the presence of Communism in music, especially folk and folk rock. He saw contemporary popular music as a Soviet plot to brainwash American youth. Unlike some other religious critics of popular music, he defended his analysis with references outside the Bible, using scholarly footnotes and quotations. His work was widely adopted by later critics of rock music.

From 1971–1977, Noebel served as vice-president and president, as well as professor of Biblical Studies at American Christian College, founded by the evangelist Billy James Hargis in Tulsa, Oklahoma. He also joined the American Philosophical Association and the Southwestern Philosophical Society. He joined the John Birch Society in the 1960s, but left in 1986.

Over the next several years, Noebel wrote about the dangers he saw in popular music, homosexuality and AIDS. Christian Crusade Recordings of Tulsa released a spoken word album, The Marxist Minstrels (1973). Its back cover promotes the book by the same name. Published in 1973, it expanded on Noebel's theories about Communist intentions in rock music. Noebel wrote The Homosexual Revolution (1977), dedicated to Anita Bryant. He says that "homosexuality rapidly is becoming one of America's most serious social problems." He later co-authored AIDS: Acquired Immune Deficiency Syndrome: A Special Report (1986), and contributed frequent articles against homosexuality to The Journal.

In 1991, he wrote Understanding the Times: The Religious Worldviews of Our Day and the Search for Truth, a textbook interpreting current intellectual movements, including biblical Christianity, secular humanism, Marxism–Leninism, the New Age Movement, Islam, and postmodernism. It is widely used among Protestant schools, churches and colleges, either in its unabridged or abridged formats. Ministry Watch described it as his most notable book. The author D. J. Grothe cited it as changing his life, inadvertently, by introducing him to humanism.

In 2000, Noebel co-authored Mind Siege: The Battle for Truth in the New Millennium with Timothy LaHaye, a generalized attack on secular humanism. Paul Kurtz, editor-in-chief of Free Inquiry, noted that the authors claim that

[T]he secular humanist ideology dominates the major institutions of American life-including the American Civil Liberties Union, the National Organization for Women, the National Endowment for the Arts, the National Association of Biology Teachers, the major television networks, the major foundations (Ford, Rockefeller, etc.), the National Council of Churches, the liberal wing of the Democratic Party, the United Nations, UNESCO, Harvard, Yale, and two thousand other colleges and universities!

Noebel has also created numerous educational materials, including textbooks (with teacher's guides) and video curricula.

== Works ==
=== Books ===
- Communism, Hypnotism and The Beatles, 1965
- Rhythm, riots, and revolution;: An analysis of the Communist use of music, the Communist master music plan, 1966
- Does the National Council of Churches speak for you?, 1969
- The Beatles: A Study in Drugs, Sex, & Revolution, 1969 (pamphlet)
- The Marxist Minstrels: A Handbook on Communist Subversion of Music, 1974
- The Homosexual Revolution: End Time Abomination, 1977
- The Slaughter of the Innocent, 1979
- The Legacy of John Lennon: Charming or Harming a Generation?, 1982
- AIDS: Acquired Immune Deficiency Syndrome, 1986 (with Wayne C. Lutton and Paul Cameron)
- Understanding the Times: The Religious Worldviews of our Day and the Search for Truth Harvest House, 1991; 2nd edition 2006
- Clergy in the Classroom: The Religion of Secular Humanism, 1995 (with J. F. Baldwin and Kevin J. Bywater)
- Mind Siege: The Battle for Truth in the New Millennium, 2000 (with Timothy LaHaye)
- The Battle for Truth, 2001; republished as Worldviews in Collision, Harvest House, 2008
- Thinking Like a Christian: Understanding and Living a Biblical Worldview (with Chuck Edwards) B&H, 2002
- Countering Culture: Arming Yourself to Confront Non-Biblical Worldviews (and Chuck Edwards) B&H, 2004
- You Can Still Trust the Communists...to Be Communists (Socialists and Progressives too) (and Fred Schwarz) Christian Anti-Communism Crusade, 2010

=== Sound recordings ===
- The Marxist Minstrels. Tulsa: Christian Crusade Recordings, 1968.

=== Video recordings ===
- Mind Siege: The Battle for the Truth (with Tim LaHaye)
