= Kobe Sanders =

American basketball player (born 2002)

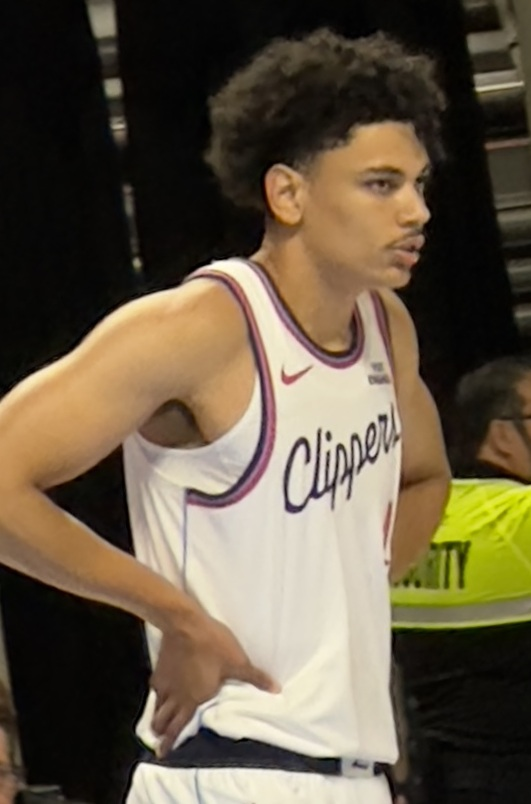
- Sanders with the Los Angeles Clippers in 2025

No. 4 – Los Angeles Clippers
- Position: Shooting guard
- League: NBA

Personal information
- Born: May 30, 2002 (age 24) Spring Valley, California, U.S.
- Listed height: 6 ft 8 in (2.03 m)
- Listed weight: 207 lb (94 kg)

Career information
- High school: Christian (El Cajon, California)
- College: Cal Poly (2020–2024); Nevada (2024–2025)
- NBA draft: 2025: 2nd round, 50th overall pick
- Drafted by: New York Knicks
- Playing career: 2025–present

Career history
- 2025–present: Los Angeles Clippers

Career highlights
- Third-team All-Mountain West (2025)
- Stats at NBA.com
- Stats at Basketball Reference

Kobe Michael Sanders (born May 30, 2002) is an American professional basketball player for the Los Angeles Clippers of the National Basketball Association (NBA). He played college basketball for the Cal Poly Mustangs and the Nevada Wolf Pack.

== Early life and high school career ==
Sanders attended Christian High School located in San Diego, California. During his senior season, he averaged 16.7 points and five rebounds per game. Ultimately, Sanders committed to playing college basketball for Cal Poly.

== College career ==
=== Cal Poly (2020–2024) ===
During his four-year career with the Mustangs of San Luis Obispo from 2020 through 2024, Sanders appeared in 100 games with 71 starts, with a career-high of 35 points, while earning All-Big West Honorable Mention honors after averaging 19.6 points per game in his final season with the team. In December 2023, Sanders set an all-time school record for most free throws made in a game without a miss, making all 17 of his free-throw attempts against CSUN. As a senior, Sanders set Cal Poly's Division I-era single-season record for free throws made, with 174. After the conclusion of the 2023–24 season, he decided to enter his name into the NCAA transfer portal.

=== Nevada (2024–2025) ===
Sanders transferred to play for the Nevada Wolf Pack. On November 22, 2024, he scored 10 points including the game-winning three in a 64–61 victory over VCU. On February 22, 2025, Sanders scored 30 points; however, the Wolf Pack would fall to Boise State 70–69. On February 25, 2025, he tallied 27 points in a win over Wyoming. Sanders finished the 2024–25 season averaging 15.8 points, 4.5 assists, 3.9 rebounds and 1.1 steals per game. He was named third-team All-Mountain West. After the conclusion of the 2024–25 season, he declared for the 2025 NBA draft while also accepting an invite to participate in the 2025 NBA scouting combine.

== Professional career ==
Sanders was selected with the 50th overall pick in the 2025 NBA draft by the New York Knicks, who traded his rights to the Los Angeles Clippers in a draft-night deal. On February 7, 2026, the Clippers promoted Sanders from his two-way contract to a standard contract. He made 68 appearances (including 16 starts) for Los Angeles during his rookie campaign, recording averages of 7.3 points, 2.3 rebounds, and 1.6 assists.

On July 7, 2026, Sanders signed a four-year, $11.2 million contract to stay with the Clippers.

== Career statistics ==
Legend
GP	Games played	GS	Games started	MPG	Minutes per game
FG%	Field goal percentage	3P%	3-point field goal percentage	FT%	Free throw percentage
RPG	Rebounds per game	APG	Assists per game	SPG	Steals per game
BPG	Blocks per game	PPG	Points per game	**Bold**	Career high

=== NBA ===
Year	Team	GP	GS	MPG	FG%	3P%	FT%	RPG	APG	SPG	BPG	PPG
2025–26	L.A. Clippers	68	16	19.9	.466	.408	.826	2.3	1.6	.7	.1	7.3
Career		68	16	19.9	.466	.408	.826	2.3	1.6	.7	.1	7.3

=== College ===
Year	Team	GP	GS	MPG	FG%	3P%	FT%	RPG	APG	SPG	BPG	PPG
2020–21	Cal Poly	20	8	16.2	.375	**.364**	.467	1.4	1.3	.4	.2	4.2
2021–22	Cal Poly	27	14	24.8	.372	.333	.607	2.5	1.9	.7	**.3**	6.4
2022–23	Cal Poly	24	20	27.8	.355	.269	.778	3.2	2.2	**1.2**	**.3**	7.7
2023–24	Cal Poly	29	29	**33.6**	.459	.339	**.874**	3.7	3.2	.8	**.3**	**19.6**
2024–25	Nevada	**33**	**32**	31.7	**.460**	.342	.795	**3.9**	**4.5**	1.1	**.3**	15.8
Career		133	103	27.7	.427	.329	.794	3.1	2.8	.9	.3	11.5
