= Donald Ray Howard =

American educator and author

Donald Ray Howard (November 27, 1933 – February 5, 2013) was an American educator and author. With his wife Esther, he co-founded Accelerated Christian Education, a fundamentalist Christian school model and curriculum.

== Background ==
Howard was born in Topeka, Kansas, to LaVerne Glenn Howard and Mildred Norrean (née Mellinger) Howard. He graduated from Topeka High School in 1951. He graduated from Washburn University, then served in the U.S. Marine Corps. Howard studied at Talbot Theological Seminary and earned his M.Th. and his Ph.D. (in 1968) from Bob Jones University. His dissertation was entitled “An Investigation of the Secular School Relative to the Needs of the Christian Community.”

Howard married Esther Hilte in 1956. They had five children: Melody, Harmony, Donald, Daniel, and Duane. Duane would eventually take over A.C.E. operations.

== Educational career ==
Howard founded Calvary College, a Christian institution, in Letcher, Kentucky, in 1966. He also founded the School of Reform.

=== Accelerated Christian Education ===
Howard's most significant contribution to education was the formation of Accelerated Christian Education (A.C.E.) with his wife Esther. The Howards opened their first A.C.E. school in Garland, Texas, in 1970. At A.C.E.’s peak in the 1980s, approximately 8,000 schools used the curriculum.

Howard opposed the U.S. public school system, denouncing it for teaching “humanism” instead of Christian Americanism. According to him, “to avoid political, social, and economic disaster, there must be a Christian curriculum which ‘establishes the presuppositions of fundamentalism in the mind, heart, and life of a new generation within the sphere of academic education.’”

Howard's identification as a fundamentalist Christian influenced his approach to education. “Fundamentalism teaches that man is by nature sinful, that he is born a lost sinner, that men who are lost go to a literal burning hell, that men can be saved by grace through faith … and then man saved can go to heaven,” he wrote. “That is fundamentalism. I am a fundamentalist. If I can be any more fundamental than fundamental, that is what I want to be.”

==== Separation from A.C.E. ====
As early as 1984, Howard was accused of engaging in extramarital affairs. At the time, fellow fundamentalist minister Jerry Falwell said, “For the sake of the cause of Christian education, Mr. Howard should divest himself of ACE, and get out of the business of teaching children.” Donald and Esther divorced in 1997, and Esther assumed control of A.C.E. in 1998. Howard married Jo Ann Hazzard in 1997; they remained married until his death in 2013.

== Political views ==
Howard called AIDS a God-sent plague which was meant “to punish gay people and other idol worshippers,” including “feminists, prochoice, and Planned Parenthood advocates.”

== Bibliography ==
- To Save a Nation (1976)
- Rebirth of Our Nation (1979)
- World Awakening (1987)
- Teen Turmoil (1988)
- Crisis in Education: Public Education a Disaster … But There’s New Hope for Parents (1990)
