= David Jeremiah =

American Christian author and pastor (born 1941)

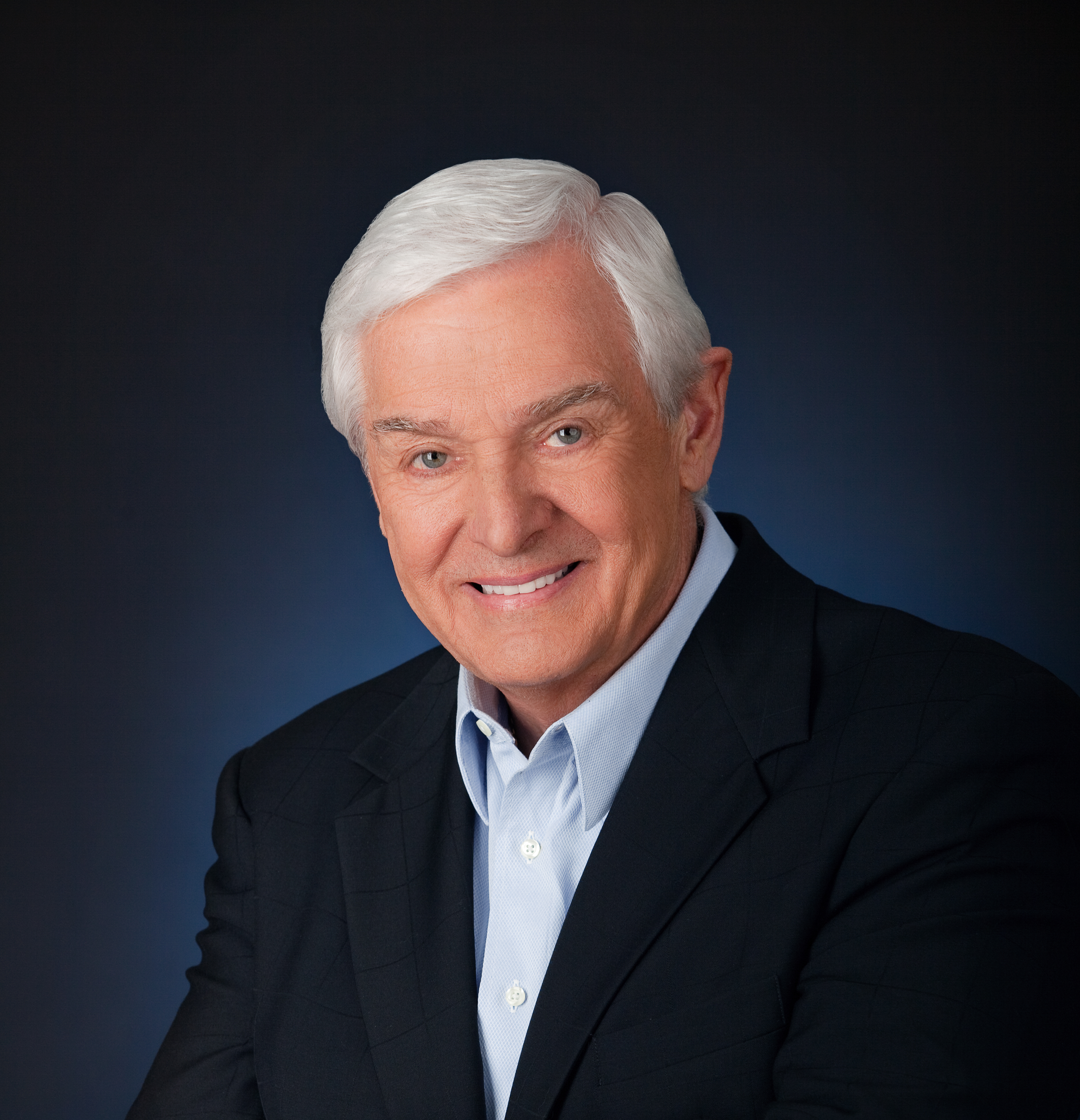
- Jeremiah in 2011
- Born: February 13, 1941 (age 85); Toledo, Ohio, U.S.
- Education: Dallas Theological Seminary (MTh); Cedarville University (BA)
- Occupations: Pastor, Shadow Mountain Community Church; Founder, Turning Point Radio and Television Ministries; Author
- Predecessor: Tim LaHaye
- Spouse: Donna Thompson (m. 1963)
- Children: 4 (Janice Dodge, David Michael Jeremiah, Jennifer Sanchez, Daniel Jeremiah)
- Parent(s): Rev. James T. Jeremiah (father); Ruby Jeremiah (mother)
- Website: davidjeremiah.org

David Jeremiah (born February 13, 1941) is an American evangelical Christian author, founder of Turning Point Radio and Television Ministries and senior pastor of Shadow Mountain Community Church, a Southern Baptist megachurch in El Cajon, California, a suburb of San Diego.

== Biography ==
David Paul Jeremiah was born in Toledo, Ohio, in 1941 to Ruby and James T. Jeremiah. At age eleven, his family, which also included his three siblings, moved to Dayton, Ohio, when his father became the pastor of Emmanuel Baptist Church. Then in 1953, the family made the move to Cedarville, Ohio, when his father became the new president of Cedarville College (now Cedarville University).

Jeremiah earned his Bachelor of Arts degree from Cedarville College in 1963, and that same year he married his college sweetheart, Donna Thompson. He went on to receive a Master's degree in Theology from Dallas Theological Seminary (1967) and completed additional graduate work at Grace Seminary (1972). Cedarville presented him with an honorary Doctor of Divinity degree in 1981.

In 1969, Jeremiah founded Blackhawk Baptist Church in Fort Wayne, Indiana, and Blackhawk Christian School in 1973. That same year, he also developed and launched The Bible Hour, gaining experience with using televised mass-media to share the Gospel. In the 12 years he was senior pastor at Blackhawk, the congregation size grew from seven families to 1,300 members.

In 1981, the Jeremiah family, which now included four children, moved to Southern California, where David Jeremiah succeeded Tim LaHaye as the senior pastor at Scott Memorial Baptist Church (now Shadow Mountain Community Church). Jeremiah's leadership of the church has led it to become affiliated with the Southern Baptist Convention and expand to nine satellite locations that include Hispanic and Arabic congregations. The main campus of the church has become home to the Southern California Seminary and Christian Unified Schools of San Diego, a K-12 Christian school district.

In 1982, Jeremiah founded Turning Point for God, a multi-media broadcast ministry. With the mission to deliver the unchanging Word of God to an ever-changing world, Turning Point's radio and television program began with local influence, developed national influence through television by 2000, and has since become an international leader in the world of broadcast ministry. Jeremiah has won numerous awards over the years through the Turning Point program, including the National Religious Broadcasters (NRB) Hall of Fame Award and the NRB President's Award in 2020.

In 1994 and again in 1998, Jeremiah was diagnosed with lymphoma. In 1999, a nodule was surgically removed from his neck and he underwent stem cell transplant therapy. The story of his experiences during that season are recorded in his book, When Your World Falls Apart.

In addition to pastoring Shadow Mountain Community Church and leading Turning Point for God, Jeremiah is an author and speaks frequently at conferences, conventions, and universities, as well as at the chapels for professional basketball and football teams.

David and Donna Jeremiah have four grown children and are the grandparents of twelve grandchildren. Jeremiah's oldest son, David Michael, is the president of Turning Point and the anchor voice of the radio program. Jeremiah's other son, Daniel, is a former NFL scout, and now works as an analyst with the NFL Network.

== Works ==
=== Books ===
- — (1983). Philippians: Twenty-Six Daily Bible Studies. B C M Publications. ISBN 0-86508-208-1.
- — (1992). Turning Toward Joy/Philippians. Chariot Victor Publishing. ISBN 1-56476-009-X. (237 pages)
- with Carlson, C. C. (1992). The Handwriting on the Wall. W Publishing Group. ISBN 0-8499-3365-X. (256 pages)
- — (1993). Turning Toward Integrity. Chariot Victor Publishing. ISBN 1-56476-070-7. (238 pages)
- — (1994). Acts of Love. Vision House. ISBN 1-885305-00-1. (204 pages)
- — (1996). What the Bible Says About Angels. Multnomah. ISBN 0-88070-902-2. (Paperback ISBN 1-57673-336-X) (222 pages)
- with Carlson, C. C. (1996). Invasion of Other Gods. W Publishing Group. ISBN 0-8499-3987-9. (240 pages)
- — (1997). The Power of Encouragement. Multnomah. ISBN 1-57673-135-9.
- — (1999). Gifts from God: Encouragement and Hope for Today's Parents. Chariot Victor Publishing. ISBN 1-56476-766-3. (240 pages)
- — (2001). Escape the Coming Night. W Publishing Group. ISBN 0-8499-4368-X. (276 pages)
- — (2001). Slaying The Giants In Your Life. W Publishing Group. ISBN 1-59328-007-6. (203 pages)
- — (2001). Stories of Hope from a Bend in the Road. J. Countryman. ISBN 0-8499-5708-7. (128 pages)
- — (2001). Until I Come. W Publishing Group. ISBN 0-8499-4275-6. (212 pages)
- — (2002). A Bend in the Road: Finding God When Your World Caves In. W Publishing Group. ISBN 0-8499-4333-7. (208 pages)
- — (2002). Sanctuary: Finding Moments of Refuge in the Presence of God. Integrity Publishers. ISBN 1-59145-023-3. (384 pages)
- — (2003). His Majesty's Melody. Integrity Publishers. ISBN 1-59145-046-2. (40 pages)
- — (2003). The Things That Matter: Living a Life of Purpose Until Christ Returns. W Publishing Group. ISBN 0-8499-1794-8. (96 pages)
- — (2004). My Heart's Desire: Living Every Moment in the Wonder of Worship. Integrity Publishers. ISBN 1-59145-154-X. (224 pages)
- — (2004). Prayer: The Great Adventure. Multnomah. ISBN 1-59052-182-X. (272 pages)
- — (2004). Searching for Heaven on Earth: How to Find What Really Matters in Life. Integrity Publishers. ISBN 1-59145-066-7. (323 pages)
- — (2004). The Prayer Matrix: Plugging into the Unseen Reality. Multnomah. ISBN 1-59052-181-1. (96 pages)
- — (2004). When Your World Falls Apart. W Publishing Group. ISBN 0-8499-0436-6. (304 pages)
- — (2005). Life Wide Open: Unleashing the Power of a Passionate Life. Integrity Publishers. ISBN 1-59145-319-4. (205 pages)
- — (2005). Turning Points; Moments of Decision in the Presence of God. Integrity Publishers. ISBN 1-59145-067-5. (383 pages)
- with Kinkade, Thomas (2005). The Secret of the Light. J. Countryman. ISBN 1-4041-0108-X. (96 pages)
- — (2006). Captured by Grace: No One Is Beyond the Reach of a Loving God. Integrity Publishers. ISBN 1-59145-389-5. (216 pages)
- — (2006). God in You: Releasing the Power of the Holy Spirit in Your Life. Multnomah Publishers Inc. ISBN 1-59052-803-4. (348 pages)
- — (2006). Why the Nativity?. Tyndale. (155 pages, made into a 2022 film)
- — (2008). What In the World is Going On?: 10 Prophetic Clues You Cannot Afford to Ignore. Thomas Nelson. ISBN 978-0-7852-2887-5. (257 pages)
- — (2009). Discover Paradise; A Guidebook to Heaven, Your True Home. Thomas Nelson. ISBN 978-140-4114-128. (128 pages)
- — (2009). Living With Confidence In A Chaotic World. Thomas Nelson. ISBN 978-0-8499-1962-6. (235 pages)
- — (2010). The Coming Economic Armageddon: What Bible Prophecy Warns About the New Global Economy. FaithWords. ISBN 978-0-446-56594-3. (293 pages)
- — (2011). I Never Thought I'd See the Day!: Culture at the Crossroads. FaithWords. ISBN 978-0-446-56595-0. (253 pages)
- — (2012). God Loves You: He Always Has – He Always Will. FaithWords. ISBN 978-0-446-56597-4. (295 pages)
- — (2013). The Jeremiah Study Bible. Worthy Publishing. ISBN 978-1-936-03489-5. (2240 pages)
- — (2014). Agents of the Apocalypse: A Riveting Look at the Key Players of the End Times. Tyndale Publishing. ISBN 978-1-4143-8049-0. (293 pages)
- — (2014). The Heart of Jesus. Worthy Publishing. ISBN 978-1-617-95320-0. (128 pages)
- — (2016). Is This The End? Signs of God's Providence in a Disturbing New World. Thomas Nelson. ISBN 978-0-718-07986-4. (240 pages)
- — (2017). A Life Beyond Amazing. Thomas Nelson. ISBN 978-0-71807990-1.
- — (2019). Everything You Need. Thomas Nelson. ISBN 978-0-78522393-1.
- — (2020). Shelter in God: Your Refuge In Times Of Trouble. Thomas Nelson. ISBN 978-0-7852-4122-5.
- — (2021). Where Do We Go From Here? How Tomorrow's Prophecies Foreshadow Today's Problems. Thomas Nelson. ISBN 978-0-7852-2419-8.
- — (2025). Vanished. Thomas Nelson. ISBN 978-1-4003-5073-5.
- — (2026). Shattered. Thomas Nelson. ISBN 978-1-4003-5077-3.

=== Recordings ===
- 9/11: Our Nation's Emergency Call
- A Bend in the Road: Experiencing God When Your World Caves in
- Best of Christian Living, with Josh McDowell, Ken Hutcherson, and Tim Lahaye
- Jesus' Final Warning: Hearing Christ's Voice in the Midst of Chaos
- What the Bible Says About Angels
- Prayer, the Great Adventure
- Fathers and Daughters
- Christians Have Stress Too
- Raising Well Adjusted Kids (Focus on the Family), with Joe White and James Dobson

== Awards and honors ==
Awards & Honors
1985	San Diego Chapter of the National Academy of Television Arts and Sciences Emmy for outstanding programming in the religious category
1998	The Gold Medallion Award for Prayer the Great Adventure
1999	The National Religious Broadcasters’ Broadcaster of the Year Award
1999	Nominated for a Gold Medallion Book Award for Jesus’ Final Warning
2000	North Carolina Christian Radio Stations Award of Excellence in Christian Radio Ministry
2000	Pacific Southwest Emmy Award for outstanding achievement in the religious program category
2002	Western Chapter of National Religious Broadcasters’ Award of Merit for Excellence in Broadcasting and Faithfulness in Service
2003	The Gold Medallion Award for My Heart's Desire, Integrity
2005	Nominated for a Gold Medallion Book Award and the Jordan Christian Book of the Year Award for Searching for Heaven
2006	National Religious Broadcasters’ Media Award for Best Radio Teaching Program
2007	G. Campbell Morgan Preaching Award
2007	Nominated for the ECPA Medallion of Excellence Award for Captured by Grace
2009	Recipient of a 2009 Retailers Choice Award in the category of Church & Culture for What in the World is Going On?
2010	Recipient of a 2010 Retailers Choice Award in the category of Christian Living for Living with Confidence in a Chaotic World.
2012	Served as Honorary Chairman of National Day of Prayer Task Force
2019	Recipient of The Illumination Book Awards, Silver award in Spirituality for Ever Faithful.
2020	National Religious Broadcasters (NRB) Hall of Fame Award and NRB President's Award
