= Babylon Rising =

Novel series

There are four novels in Tim LaHaye's fiction series Babylon Rising (the first co-authored by Greg Dinallo and the others by Dr. Bob Phillips, Ph.D). Each novel has to do with the hero, Michael Murphy, a college professor, and his struggles (on which he is sent by a mysterious rich man calling himself "Methuselah") to find an artifact that could prove the Bible correct. Murphy must deal with "The Seven", an evil group "bent on creating a one-world religion, government, and currency", and Talon, the man with a knifelike fingernail on one prosthetic finger who carries out The Seven's orders.

== Books ==
=== Babylon Rising ===
The first book goes by the same name as the series, Babylon Rising. It chronicles the adventures of Michael Murphy and how he tries to find the three pieces of The Brazen Serpent at the call of Methuselah. Michael loses his wife after she is murdered in the aftermath of a church bombing. Murphy got the tail, although Talon steals it for the Seven, Murphy and Isis then get the middle section but loses the head of the Brazen serpent, during a battle with Talon and Talon's Falcon. But, owing to high powered technology, he finds an extra archeological find which many would kill to get. Murphy finds the golden head of the statue of Nebuchadnezzar.

=== The Secret on Ararat ===
The second book of the series, entitled The Secret on Ararat, again chronicles the adventures of Murphy and Isis and how they search for Noah's Ark in order to prove to the world the truths of the Bible. Murphy's arch enemy, Talon, steals from Murphy brass plates which hold the secret of the Philosopher's Stone. Murphy and Isis Proserpina McDonald, a philologist who has helped Murphy before and who is developing a romantic relationship with him, catch up with Talon on a ship in the Black Sea. Talon falls overboard in an attempt to catch a rucksack with the plates. The story only states that Talon jumped over the rail to get the rucksack. The fate of him and the rucksack are unknown.

=== The Europa Conspiracy ===
The third book in the series, called: The Europa Conspiracy, is about the rise of the Seven, Michael Murphy's attempt to find the handwriting on the wall and his growing relationship with Isis, as well as the complication of Talon's attempts to assassinate Murphy under direction from the Seven. It also contains an attempted terrorist attack on a New York City bridge.

=== The Edge of Darkness ===
The fourth book in Babylon Rising, The Edge of Darkness, is about Michael Murphy locating the Lost Temple of Dagon which contains Aaron's Rod and the Golden Jar of Manna. Michael Murphy finally discovers the identity of Methuselah, the mysterious rich man who had set Murphy on all his quests. Talon attempts to kill professor Murphy's assistant, Shari, but Paul Wallach thwarts the attempt and in return his life is taken. At the end of the book, Murphy watches Talon drown after a submarine battle. The Mossad, along with Murphy, uncover one of the Bible’s most feared warnings–a prophecy of false miracles, false messiahs, and ultimate evil.

== Development ==
Plans for the series were announced in 2004, after LaHaye signed a book deal for a series of books set around The Book of Revelation. Bantam reportedly paid LaHaye $40 million for the four book deal, although LaHaye said that he and Bantam had since “readjusted” the sum downward.

== Sales and reception ==
Reception of the Babylon Rising series was favorable enough for two of the books in the series to place on the New York Times Best Seller List.

Violet Chesser reviewed the series for The Vincennes Sun-Commercial, rating the books favorably.
