= Daniel Jeremiah =

American football analyst (born 1977)

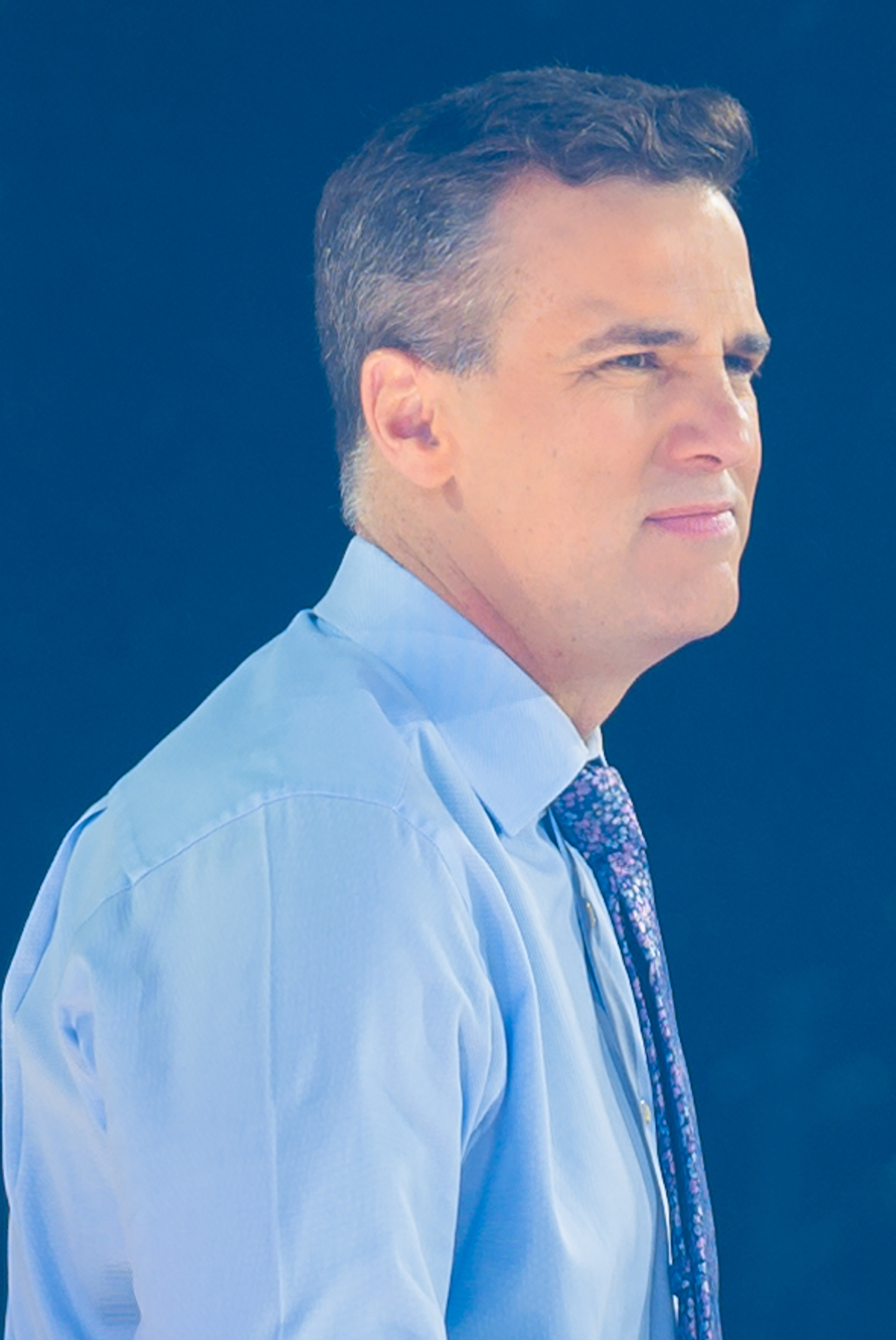
- Jeremiah at the 2021 NFL draft
- Born: December 5, 1977 (age 48); Fort Wayne, Indiana, U.S.
- Spouse: Meredith Rae (m. 2000)
- Children: 4
- Parent: David Jeremiah (father)
- Football career

Career information
- High school: Christian (San Diego, California)
- College: Northeastern Louisiana (1997); Appalachian State (1998–2000)

Career history
- Baltimore Ravens (2003–2004) Personnel assistant; Baltimore Ravens (2005–2006) West coast scout; Cleveland Browns (2007–2008) National scout; Philadelphia Eagles (2010–2012) West coast scout

Daniel James Jeremiah (born December 5, 1977) is an American analyst and writer for the NFL Network and NFL.com. He also serves as a color commentator for Los Angeles Chargers games on KFI radio.

Jeremiah was a starting quarterback at Northeastern Louisiana in 1997 and Appalachian State from 1998 to 2000. He was a college scout with the Baltimore Ravens, Cleveland Browns, and Philadelphia Eagles.

Jeremiah joined the NFL Network in May 2012. He is married and has four children. He is the son of David Jeremiah, author and senior pastor of Shadow Mountain Community Church.
