= Beverly LaHaye =

American activist and author (1929–2024)

- Born: Beverly Jean Davenport; April 30, 1929; Oakland County, Michigan, U.S.
- Died: April 14, 2024 (aged 94); El Cajon, California, U.S.
- Education: Bob Jones University
- Spouse: Tim LaHaye (m. 1947; died 2016)
- Children: 4

Beverly Jean Davenport LaHaye (née Ratcliffe; April 30, 1929 – April 14, 2024) was an American Christian conservative activist and author who founded Concerned Women for America (CWA) in San Diego, California, in 1979. She was the wife of Tim LaHaye, an evangelical Christian minister and author of the Left Behind series, until his death in 2016. Along with her husband, she helped shape the Christian right.

== Personal life ==
Beverly Jean Davenport was born in Oakland County, Michigan, on April 30, 1929, to Lowell Ardo and Nellie Elizabeth (née Pitts) Davenport. Her father was a factory worker in Southfield, Michigan, and died of a ruptured appendix when Beverly was almost two years old. Within two years, Nellie Elizabeth married Daniel Ratcliffe, a tool maker in the auto industry in Oakland County, Michigan. From then on, Beverly Jean and her older sister Blanche Aileen used their stepfather's surname as their own.

She graduated from Highland Park Community High School in 1946. She attended Bob Jones University (then named Bob Jones College) and married Air Force veteran and aspiring pastor Tim LaHaye in 1947. After attending college for one year, she dropped out and joined the workforce to support the family finances, as her husband Tim made little money as a pastor. In 1956, the LaHayes moved to San Diego, California, where Tim became the pastor of Scott Memorial Baptist Church. Beverly became the church secretary and helped direct junior Sunday School. Despite having a shy personality and struggling with the monotony of homemaking, LaHaye believed that homemaking would help her learn submission. She was influenced by fellow conservative activist Phyllis Schlafly. In 1981, she became a member of the San Diego County Commission on the Status of Women.

Along with her husband, LaHaye was a member of Liberty University's board of trustees. In 69 years of marriage, the LaHayes had four children, respectively named Linda, Larry, Lee, and Lori, and nine grandchildren. LaHaye died at a hospice facility in El Cajon, California, on April 14, 2024, at the age of 94.

== Concerned Women for America ==
LaHaye formed Concerned Women for America (CWA) in 1979. Initially, CWA was a reaction to the National Organization for Women and a 1978 Barbara Walters interview with feminist Betty Friedan. LaHaye stated that she believed Friedan's goal was "to dismantle the bedrock of American culture: the family", and that Christian women were not included in discussions of women's rights. LaHaye held a rally in a local San Diego auditorium which marked the beginning of CWA. She described the organization's fight against "a humanistic, godless philosophy" and a "life-and-death battle to preserve decency."

While CWA was originally intended to be a local group, the organization was established nationwide within two years. The organization calls itself "the nation's largest public policy women's organization devoted to biblical principles." When CWA's headquarters moved to Washington, D.C., LaHaye "announced at a press conference: 'This is our message: the feminists do not speak for all women in America, and CWA is here in Washington to end the monopoly of feminists who claim to speak for all women.'"

LaHaye successfully encouraged political mobilization among the organization's members: "98 percent of CWA members voted in the 1988 presidential election, 93 percent had signed or circulated a petition, 77 percent had boycotted a company or product, 74 percent had contacted a public official, and nearly half had written a letter to the editor." The CWA strongly supported Ronald Reagan during his presidency, and Reagan credited LaHaye with "changing the face of American politics". CWA is a 501(c)(3) nonprofit organization, which is "supported by hundreds of local chapters across the country." In 2014, Salon stated that "CWA [had] become a powerful political force, claiming over half a million members." LaHaye led the organization until 2006.

== Published works ==
LaHaye and her husband co-authored the influential Christian self-help sex manual The Act of Marriage: The Beauty of Sexual Love in 1976. LaHaye wrote The Spirit-Controlled Woman in 1976, a companion to her husband's book The Spirit-Controlled Temperament. A revised and expanded edition of the book, The New Spirit-Controlled Woman, was released in 2005. The Desires of a Woman's Heart was released in 1993.

== Bibliography ==
- The Act of Marriage: The Beauty of Sexual Love (1976) OCLC 1859880 (co-authored with Timothy LaHaye)
- The Spirit-Controlled Woman (1976) OCLC 3033275
- How to Develop Your Child's Temperament (1977) OCLC 3312367
- I Am a Woman by God's Design (1980) OCLC 6813275
- The Restless Woman (1984) OCLC 10912698
- The Desires of a Woman's Heart (1993) OCLC 855192530
