= Mind Siege =

2001 book by Timothy LaHaye and David Noebel

- Author: David Noebel, Tim LaHaye
- Language: English
- Genre: Religion
- Publisher: World Publishing
- Publication date: January 9, 2001
- Publication place: United States
- Pages: 354
- ISBN: 978-0-8499-1672-4

Mind Siege: The Battle for Truth in the New Millennium is a Christian prophesy-fiction book written by Timothy LaHaye and David Noebel. Published in 2001, this book offers many insights into the authors' interpretations of secular humanism.

== Overview ==
The book proposes a conspiracy theory asserting that various groups are plotting to transform America into an amoral, humanist nation, suitable for merging into a one-world socialist state.

The groups allegedly involved in the conspiracy include: The American Civil Liberties Union, The National Association for the Advancement of Colored People, The National Organization for Women, The National Endowment for the Arts, The National Association of Biology Teachers, Planned Parenthood, The "major TV networks, high-profile newspapers, and newsmagazines," The United States Department of State, The major philanthropic foundations (The Rockefeller Foundation, The Carnegie Foundation and The Ford Foundation), The World Council of Churches, The National Council of Churches, The United Nations, UNESCO, The "left wing of the Democratic Party," The Democratic Socialists of America, Harvard, Yale, and "2,000 other colleges and universities".
