= The Act of Marriage =

Religious self-help book

- Authors: Tim LaHaye and Beverly LaHaye
- Subject: Christian studies books, Marriage, Self-help books, Sex manuals
- Publisher: Zondervan
- Publication date: 1976, 1998 Updated edition
- Publication place: United States
- Pages: 400
- ISBN: 978-0-310-21200-3

The Act of Marriage: The Beauty of Sexual Love is a self-help book, written by Christian writers Tim LaHaye and Beverly LaHaye.

== Summary ==
The Act of Marriage explains sexual satisfaction for Christian married couples. It is based on several books of the Bible, notably the Song of Songs. The book is noteworthy for opening up dialogue among Christians about their sexuality – especially female sexuality and sexual satisfaction. It discusses birth control and concepts of sexology. The book seeks to depict enjoyment of sex within marriage as positive rather than sinful. It frames marital sex as an important part of a complementarian, divinely designed relationship – with men as aggressive, sexually voracious leaders whose submissive wives provide them with sexual satisfaction to boost their egos and thereby make them more confident leaders, as part of God's design for gender roles.

== Reception ==
As of 2016, 2.5 million copies of the book were sold.

== Criticism ==
Rolling Stone magazine criticized the book as "an explicit Christian sex manual, condemning petting, abortion and homosexuality." However, many Christian groups hail the book as a milestone in contemporary Christian sex education.

== Academic study ==
Within academia, The Act of Marriage is viewed as an interesting insight into the ever-changing relationship between mainstream religion and sexual practice. Michigan State professor Amy DeRogatis examined the book and others of the sort to explore the impacts they have on gender roles within the evangelical Protestant tradition. While it pushes the boundaries of accepted sexual practice within evangelical heterosexual marriage to that point, it upholds a strictly complementarian view of gender. At some points within the text it describes men as "beasts" and "uncontrollable" in the context of sexual desire, while it paints women as pleasers and far less sexual than their husbands.
