= Mozert v. Hawkins =

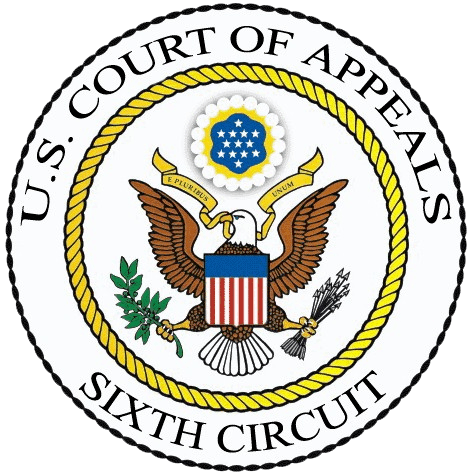
- Court: United States Court of Appeals for the Sixth Circuit
- Full case name: Bob & Alice Mozert v. Hawkins County Board of Education (Hawkins County Public Schools)
- Argued: July 9, 1987
- Decided: August 24, 1987
- Citation: 827 F.2d 1058

Case history
- Prior history: Injunction granted, claim for damages dismissed, Mozert v. Hawkins Cty. Pub. Sch., 647 F. Supp. 1194 (E.D. Tenn. 1986)
- Subsequent history: Rehearing denied (October 5, 1987); cert. denied, 484 U.S. 1066 (1988).

Court membership
- Judges sitting: Pierce Lively, Cornelia Groefsema Kennedy, Danny Julian Boggs

Case opinions
- Majority: Lively, joined by Kennedy
- Concurrence: Boggs

Laws applied
- U.S. Const. amend. I

Mozert v. Hawkins, 827 F.2d 1058 (6th Cir. 1987), was a notable case involving First Amendment rights of religion in protesting required public school reading for students in Tennessee.

== Background ==
Students' parents at a public school were offended by themes being taught in the required reading of classes. Among these were the use of magical powers in Shakespeare's Macbeth, which offended the religious beliefs of these parents. The parents felt that they had a right to choose what their children could or could not view and learn at school and what was being taught was not approved by them.

The parents, under Bob Mozert, therefore brought a class action lawsuit against the Hawkins County Public School District, stating that their freedom of expression clause had been violated in these required books. The school had given them no alternative reading options for their children that could have avoided this case. The parents argued that their right to free expression was null if the state could decide whatever topics it could teach children. They stated the book taught their children about witchcraft and the occult, disrespect and disobedience to parents, prayer to idols, along with various secular and humanist ideas.

The lower court ruled in favor of Mozert and the parents and deemed that the school board had to consider the parents' wishes in accommodating their wishes. The school board felt this ruling was unfair and was a mistaken enactment of the free expression clause and therefore appealed the case.

== Case ==
The court considered if there indeed was any impedance to rights of expression. The court took into account that it was required reading and not required worship or examination. The court also determined that among the parents' complaints, none of them in fact took away anyone's rights to express freely; they were, simply put, the views of another.

No evidence could be found that the School Board or the State had coerced the school children into changing their beliefs, or adopting new ones. The only violation that could be found was that the School Board did make a breach when it taught that there were multiple ways to worship God, not just one. This, both the parents and the court, believed to be a coercion of beliefs and thus in violation of the free expression clause.

== Decision ==
The court ruled in the defendant's favor in part, overturning the decision and stating that the School Board was not in violation for requiring the reading to children; it was up to them and their parents to interpret the book for themselves. However, the School Board was in violation of the first amendment when it had informed the students that there is not one particular way to worship and that they could find any way to express they desired. The School Board was required immediately to cease this action.

== Significance ==
This case set further precedent for the free expression clause used in public schools. It allows for state schools to teach controversial religious material to students, provided that they are not endorsing, condoning, or in any way encouraging either the belief or expression, or any aspect of a student's faith.
