= Tim LaHaye =

Evangelical Christian minister and author from the United States

- Born: Timothy Francis LaHaye; April 27, 1926; Detroit, Michigan, U.S.
- Died: July 25, 2016 (aged 90); San Diego, California, U.S.
- Education: Bob Jones University (BA); Western Seminary (DMin)
- Occupations: Minister, author
- Spouse: Beverly Ratcliffe (m. 1947)
- Children: 4
- Writing career
- Period: 1966–2016
- Genres: Religious, apocalyptic, science fiction
- Notable work: Left Behind
- Military career
- Allegiance: United States
- Branch: United States Army Air Forces
- Conflicts: World War II: European Theater

Timothy Francis LaHaye (April 27, 1926 – July 25, 2016) was an American Baptist evangelical Christian minister and political activist who wrote more than 85 books, both non-fiction and fiction, including (with co-author Jerry B. Jenkins) the Left Behind series of novels depicting apocalypse events after a pre-tribulation rapture.

He was a founder of the Council for National Policy, a conservative Christian advocacy group. LaHaye opposed homosexuality, believing it to be immoral and unbiblical. He was a critic of Roman Catholicism, and a believer in conspiracy theories regarding the Illuminati. LaHaye has been called "one of the most influential evangelicals of the late twentieth century" and, along with his wife Beverly LaHaye, he helped shape the beliefs and organizations of the Christian right.

Born in Detroit, Michigan, he experienced the early death of his father, which he later cited as a formative spiritual moment. LaHaye served in the U.S. Army Air Forces during World War II and later earned degrees from Bob Jones University and Western Seminary. He pastored congregations in South Carolina, Minnesota, and California, spending nearly 25 years at Scott Memorial Baptist Church in San Diego. He co-founded Christian Heritage College (now San Diego Christian College) and the Institute for Creation Research, and authored The Act of Marriage, a Christian guide promoting marital sexuality within a complementarian framework.

LaHaye was heavily involved in conservative political activism, founding groups such as Californians for Biblical Morality and the American Coalition for Traditional Values, and encouraging the creation of the Moral Majority. He supported several Republican presidential campaigns. His views included premillennial dispensationalism. He was recognized as one of the most influential evangelicals of his era, with numerous awards and tributes, including from Time and Liberty University.

== Biography ==
=== Early life ===
Timothy Francis LaHaye was born on April 27, 1926, in Detroit, Michigan, to Frank LaHaye, a Ford auto worker who died in 1936 of a heart attack, and Margaret LaHaye (née Palmer). His father's death had a significant influence on LaHaye, who was only nine years old at the time. He had been inconsolable until the minister at the funeral said, "This is not the end of Frank LaHaye; because he accepted Jesus Christ, the day will come when the Lord will shout from heaven and descend, and the dead in Christ will rise first and then we'll be caught up together to meet him in the air."

LaHaye later said that, upon hearing those remarks, "all of a sudden, there was hope in my heart I'd see my father again."

LaHaye enlisted in the United States Army Air Forces in 1944, at the age of 18, after he finished high school. He served in the European Theater of Operations as a machine gunner aboard a bomber. Then he studied at Bob Jones University in Greenville, South Carolina, where he met his wife, Beverly, and obtained a Bachelor of Arts in 1950. LaHaye held the Doctor of Ministry degree from Western Seminary.

=== Ministry ===
He served as a pastor in Pumpkintown, South Carolina, and after that he pastored a congregation in Minneapolis until 1956. After that, the LaHaye family moved to San Diego, California, where he served as pastor of the Scott Memorial Baptist Church (which later split and renamed Grace Church San Diego in the North Park neighborhood of San Diego, and Shadow Mountain Community Church in El Cajon) for nearly 25 years.

In 1971, he founded Christian Heritage College, now known as San Diego Christian College. In 1972, LaHaye helped establish the Institute for Creation Research in El Cajon, California, along with Henry M. Morris.

In 1976, the couple wrote The Act of Marriage, a Christian self-help sex manual. The book sought to depict enjoyment of sex within marriage as positive rather than sinful. It frames marital sex as an important part of a complementarian, divinely designed relationship – with men as aggressive, sexually voracious leaders whose submissive wives provide them with sexual satisfaction to boost their egos and thereby make them more confident leaders, as part of God's design for gender roles.

=== Political activism ===
LaHaye started numerous groups to promote his views, having become involved in politics at the Christian Voice during the late 1970s and early 1980s. In 1979, he founded Californians for Biblical Morality, which has been described as "in many ways...the genesis of the Christian right." The same year, LaHaye encouraged Jerry Falwell to found the Moral Majority and was among its three directors.

LaHaye was a member of and speaker for the John Birch Society (JBS), a conservative, anti-communist group; scholar Celestini Carmen argues that LaHaye used the JBS's culture war methods and rhetoric of "fear, apocalyptic thought and conspiracy" to forge the Moral Majority, with "fear, anger, and disgust as essential ingredients." His book Rapture Under Attack describes his time in the JBS and relationship to its leader, Robert W. Welch Jr.

Also in 1979, LaHaye's wife, Beverly, founded Concerned Women for America, a conservative Christian women's activist group.

Then in 1981, he left the pulpit to concentrate his time on politics and writing. That year, he helped found the Council for National Policy (CNP), a policy-making think tank in which membership is only available through invitation. ABC News called it "the most powerful conservative organization in America you've never heard of".

In the 1980s he was criticized by the evangelical community for accepting money from Bo Hi Pak, a longtime Sun Myung Moon operative. He was additionally criticized for joining Moon's Council for Religious Freedom, which was founded to protest Moon's 1984 imprisonment. In 1996, LaHaye's wife spoke at an event sponsored by Moon.

In the 1980s, LaHaye founded the American Coalition for Traditional Values and the Coalition for Religious Freedom. He founded the Pre-Trib Research Center along with Thomas Ice in 1993. The center is dedicated to producing material that supports a dispensationalist, pre-tribulation interpretation of the Bible.

LaHaye also took more direct roles in presidential politics. He supported Ronald Reagan's elections as United States president. He was a co-chairman of Jack Kemp's 1988 presidential bid but was removed from the campaign after four days when his anti-Catholic views became known. LaHaye played a significant role in getting the Religious Right to support George W. Bush for the presidency in 2000. In 2007, he endorsed Mike Huckabee during the primaries and served as his spiritual advisor.

=== Left Behind ===
LaHaye is best known for the Left Behind series of apocalyptic fiction that depicts the Earth after the pretribulation rapture which premillennial dispensationalists believe the Bible states, multiple times, will occur. The books were LaHaye's idea, though Jerry B. Jenkins, a former sportswriter with numerous other works of fiction to his name, wrote the books from LaHaye's notes.

The series, which started in 1995 with the first novel, includes 12 titles in the adult series, as well as juvenile novels, audio books, devotionals, and graphic novels. The books have been very popular, with total sales surpassing 65 million copies as of July 2016. Seven titles in the adult series have reached No. 1 on the bestseller lists for The New York Times, USA Today, and Publishers Weekly. Jerry Falwell said about the first book in the series: "In terms of its impact on Christianity, it's probably greater than that of any other book in modern times, outside the Bible." The best-selling series has been compared to the equally popular works of Tom Clancy and Stephen King: "the plotting is brisk and the characterizations Manichean. People disappear and things blow up."

LaHaye indicates that the idea for the series came to him one day circa 1994, while he was sitting on an airplane and observed a married pilot flirting with a flight attendant. He wondered what would befall the pilot if the Rapture happened at that moment. The first book in the series opens with a similar scene. He sold the movie rights for the Left Behind series and later stated he regretted that decision, because the films turned out to be "church-basement videos", rather than "a big-budget blockbuster" that he had hoped for.

=== Later activities ===
In 2001, LaHaye co-hosted with Dave Breese the prophecy television program The King Is Coming. In 2001, LaHaye gave $4.5 million to Liberty University to build a new student center, which opened in January 2002 and was named after LaHaye. He, alongside his wife, served as a member of Liberty's board of trustees.

He provided funds for the LaHaye Ice Center on the campus of Liberty University, which opened in January 2006.

LaHaye's book The Rapture was released on June 6, 2006, in order to capitalize on a 6-6-6 connection.

=== Personal life and death ===
Tim LaHaye married activist and fellow author Beverly Ratcliffe in 1947 while attending Bob Jones University.

In July 2016, the LaHayes celebrated their 69th wedding anniversary. They had four children and nine grandchildren, and lived in the Los Angeles area. The LaHayes owned a condo in Rancho Mirage, California.

LaHaye died on July 25, 2016, in a hospital in San Diego, California, after suffering from a stroke, aged 90. In addition to his wife, Beverly, he was survived by four children, nine grandchildren, 16 great-grandchildren, a brother (Richard LaHaye), and a sister. His funeral service took place at Shadow Mountain Community Church on August 12, 2016, with David Jeremiah, who succeeded LaHaye as pastor at what was then Scott Memorial Baptist Church, led the service. LaHaye is interred at Miramar National Cemetery in San Diego, California.

== Views ==
=== Homosexuality ===
In 1978 LaHaye published The Unhappy Gays, which was later retitled What Everyone Should Know About Homosexuality. The book called homosexuals "militant, organized" and "vile." The Unhappy Gays also argues that homosexuals share 16 pernicious traits, including "incredible promiscuity", "deceit", "selfishness", "vulnerability to sadism-masochism", and "poor health and an early death." He believed that homosexuality can be cured. However, he said that such conversions are rare.

=== Global conspiracies ===
LaHaye believed that the Illuminati is secretly engineering world affairs. In Rapture Under Attack he wrote:

I myself have been a forty-five year student of the satanically-inspired, centuries-old conspiracy to use government, education, and media to destroy every vestige of Christianity within our society and establish a new world order. Having read at least fifty books on the Illuminati, I am convinced that it exists and can be blamed for many of man's inhumane actions against his fellow man during the past two hundred years.

The Illuminati is just one of many groups that he believed are working to "turn America into an amoral, humanist country, ripe for merger into a one-world socialist state." Other secret societies and liberal groups working to destroy "every vestige of Christianity", according to LaHaye, include: the Trilateral Commission, the American Civil Liberties Union, the National Association for the Advancement of Colored People, the National Organization for Women, Planned Parenthood, "the major TV networks, high-profile newspapers and newsmagazines," the State Department, major foundations (Rockefeller, Carnegie, Ford), the United Nations, "the left wing of the Democratic Party", Harvard, Yale "and 2,000 other colleges and universities."

LaHaye believed that political mobilization of the Christian right in voting for Ronald Reagan thwarted the Illuminati, who had been attempting to create a New World Order.

=== Eschatology ===
While himself a premillennialist who asserted the end times were near and that the nation will be judged, LaHaye also adopted aspects of R. J. Rushdoony's postmillennialist movement, Christian reconstructionism. Despite varying beliefs on how the end times will occur, both groups share a "desire to reclaim the culture for Christ by reasserting patriarchal authority and waging battle against encroaching secular humanism, in all its guises."

The eschatological views of LaHaye have been described as "view[ing] the U.N. and Islam as literally satanic; oppos[ing] any compromise in the Israeli–Palestinian conflict; and foresee[ing] an imminent eschatological crisis in which millions of human beings will perish in agony".

Other believers in dispensational premillennialism, who believe that the return of Jesus is imminent, criticize various aspects of his theology.

Many mainstream Christians and certain other evangelicals had broader disagreements with the Left Behind series as a whole, pointing out that "most biblical scholars largely reject the eschatological assumptions of this kind of pop end-times literature." In The Rapture Exposed by Barbara Rossing, a number of criticisms are raised regarding the series, particularly its focus on violence.

=== Anti-Catholic sentiments ===
LaHaye was a harsh critic of Roman Catholicism, which he called "a false religion". In his 1973 book Revelation Illustrated and Made Plain, he stated that the Catholic Church "is more dangerous than no religion because she substitutes religion for truth" and "is also dangerous because some of her doctrines are pseudo-Christian." Elsewhere the same book compared Catholic ceremonies to pagan rituals. It was these statements that were largely responsible for LaHaye's dismissal from Jack Kemp's 1988 presidential campaign. It was later revealed that Scott Memorial Baptist Church, the San Diego church that LaHaye had pastored throughout the 1970s, had sponsored an anti-Catholic group called Mission to Catholics; one of their pamphlets asserted that Pope Paul VI was the "archpriest of Satan, a deceiver, and an antichrist, who has, like Judas, gone to his own place."

The issue of anti-Catholicism also comes up in regard to the Left Behind series. While the fictional Pope John XXIV was raptured, he is described as having "stirred up controversy in the church with a new doctrine that seemed to coincide more with the 'heresy' of Martin Luther than with the historic orthodoxy they were used to," and this is implied as the reason he was raptured. His successor, Pope Peter II, becomes Pontifex Maximus of Enigma Babylon One World Faith, an amalgamation of all remaining world faiths and religions.

Other Catholic writers have said that while the books aren't "anti-Catholic per se", they reflect LaHaye's other writings on the subject.

Despite his anti-Catholic views, he praised traditionalist Catholic director Mel Gibson's 2004 film The Passion of the Christ, saying that "Everyone should see this movie. It could be Hollywood's finest achievement to date." He also endorsed Catholic convert Newt Gingrich for president in 2012. In the Left Behind series, the Pope was raptured though this may have had more to do with Jerry B. Jenkins.

== Tributes ==
Time Magazine named LaHaye one of the 25 most influential evangelicals in America, and in the summer of 2001, the Evangelical Studies Bulletin named him the most influential Christian leader of the preceding quarter century.

== Awards ==
He received an Honorary Doctorate in Literature from Liberty University.

== Works ==
LaHaye authored over 85 books in his lifetime.

=== Novels ===
Left Behind series (with Jerry B. Jenkins)

Left Behind series:

1. Oct. 1995, Left Behind: A Novel of the Earth's Last Days (ISBN 0-8423-2912-9)
2. Oct. 1996, Tribulation Force: The Continuing Drama of Those Left Behind (ISBN 0-8423-2921-8)
3. Oct. 1997, Nicolae: The Rise of Antichrist (ISBN 0-8423-2924-2)
4. Aug. 1998, Soul Harvest: The World Takes Sides (ISBN 0-8423-2925-0)
5. Feb. 1999, Apollyon: The Destroyer Is Unleashed (ISBN 0-8423-2926-9)
6. Aug. 1999, Assassins: Assignment: Jerusalem, Target: Antichrist (ISBN 0-8423-2927-7)
7. May. 2000, The Indwelling: The Beast Takes Possession (ISBN 0-8423-2929-3)
8. Nov. 2000, The Mark: The Beast Rules the World (ISBN 0-8423-3228-6)
9. Oct. 2001, Desecration: Antichrist Takes the Throne (ISBN 0-8423-3229-4)
10. Jul. 2002, The Remnant: On the Brink of Armageddon (ISBN 0-8423-3230-8)
11. Apr. 2003, Armageddon: The Cosmic Battle of the Ages (ISBN 0-8423-3236-7)
12. Mar. 2004, Glorious Appearing: The End of Days (ISBN 0-8423-3237-5)
13. Apr. 2007, Kingdom Come: The Final Victory (ISBN 0-8423-6061-1)

Before They Were Left Behind series (prequel):

1. March 2005, The Rising: Before They Were Left Behind (ISBN 0-8423-6056-5)
2. November 2005, The Regime: Before They Were Left Behind (ISBN 1-4143-0576-1)
3. June 6, 2006, The Rapture (ISBN 1-4143-0580-X)

Left Behind: The Kids series (spin off):

1. The Vanishings: Four Kids Face Earth's Last Days Together (1998)
2. Second Chance: The Search For Truth (1998)
3. Through the Flames: The Kids Risk Their Lives (1998)
4. Facing the Future: Preparing for Battle (1998)
5. Nicolae High: The Young Trib Force Goes Back to School (1999)
6. The Underground: The Young Trib Force Fights Back (1999, with Chris Fabry)
7. Busted!: The Young Trib Force Faces Pressure (2000, with Chris Fabry)
8. Death Strike: The Young Trib Force Faces War (2000, with Chris Fabry)
9. The Search: The Struggle to Survive (2000, with Chris Fabry)
10. On the Run: The Young Trib Force Faces Danger (2000)
11. Into the Storm: The Search for Secret Documents (2000, with Chris Fabry)
12. Earthquake!: The Young Trib Force Faces Disaster (2000, with Chris Fabry)
13. The Showdown: Behind Enemy Lines (2001, with Chris Fabry)
14. Judgment Day: Into Raging Waters (2001, with Chris Fabry)
15. Battling the Commander: The Hidden Cave (2001, with Chris Fabry)
16. Fire from Heaven (2001, with Chris Fabry)
17. Terror in the Stadium: Witnesses Under Fire (2001, with Chris Fabry)
18. Darkening Skies: Judgment of Ice (2001, with Chris Fabry)
19. Attack of Apollyon: Revenge of the Locusts (2002)
20. A Dangerous Plan: Race Against Time (2002, with Chris Fabry)
21. Secrets of New Babylon: The Search for an Imposter (2002)
22. Escape from New Babylon: Discovering New Believers (2002, with Chris Fabry)
23. Horsemen of Terror: The Unseen Judgment (2002, with Chris Fabry)
24. Uplink from the Underground: Showtime for Vicki (2002, with Chris Fabry)
25. Death at the Gala: History in the Making (2003, with Chris Fabry)
26. The Beast Arises: Unveiling the Plan (2003, with Chris Fabry)
27. Wildfire: Into the Great Tribulation (2003, with Chris Fabry)
28. The Mark of the Beast: Dilemma in New Bablyon (2003, with Chris Fabry)
29. Breakout!: Believers in Danger (2003)
30. Murder in the Holy Place: Carpathia's Deadly Deception (2003, with Chris Fabry)
31. Escape to Masada: Joining Operation Eagle (2003, with Chris Fabry)
32. War of the Dragon: Miracles in the Air (2003, with Chris Fabry)
33. Attack on Petra: Through the Inferno (2004, with Chris Fabry)
34. Bounty Hunters: Believers in the Crosshairs (2004, with Chris Fabry)
35. The Rise of False Messiahs: Carpathia's Evil Tricks (2004)
36. Ominous Choices: The Race for Life (2004, with Chris Fabry)
37. Heat Wave: Surviving the Fourth Bowl Judgment (2004, with Chris Fabry)
38. The Perils of Love: Breaking Through the Darkness (2004, with Chris Fabry)
39. The Road to War: Facing the Guillotine (2004, with Chris Fabry)
40. Triumphant Return: The New Jerusalem (2004, with Chris Fabry)

Babylon Rising series

1. October 2003, Babylon Rising, with Greg Dinallo (ISBN 0-553-80322-0)
2. August 2004, The Secret on Ararat, with Dr. Bob Phillips, Ph.D (ISBN 0-553-80323-9)
3. September 2005, The Europa Conspiracy, with Dr. Bob Phillips, Ph.D (ISBN 0-553-80324-7)
4. August 29, 2006, The Edge of Darkness, with Dr. Bob Phillips, Ph.D (ISBN 0-553-80325-5)

The Jesus Chronicles series (with Jerry B. Jenkins)

1. John's Story: The Last Eyewitness (2006) (ISBN 0-399-15389-6)
2. Mark's Story: The Gospel According to Peter (2007)
3. Luke's Story: By Faith Alone (2009)
4. Matthew's Story: From Sinner To Saint (2010)

The End series (with Craig Parshall)

1. Edge of Apocalypse (2010)
2. Thunder of Heaven (2011)
3. Brink of Chaos (2012)
4. Mark of Evil (2014)

Standalone novels

- Come Spring (2005, with Gregory S. Dinallo)
- Always Grace (2008, with Greg Dinallo, Gregory S. Dinallo)

=== Comics ===
Left Behind Graphic Novel series (with Jerry B. Jenkins)

1. Left Behind: A Graphic Novel of Earth's Last Days (2001, with Aaron Lopresti, Jeffrey Moy)
2. Tribulation Force: The Continuing Drama of Those Left Behind (2002, with Brian Augustyn)

=== Poems ===
- Our Favorite Verse (1986, Beverly LaHaye)

=== Nonfiction ===
Self-help

- Spirit-Controlled Temperament (1966)
- How to Be Happy Though Married (1968)
- Transforming Your Temperament (1971)
- The Beginning of the End (1972)
- How To Win Over Depression (1974)
- Ten Steps to Victory Over Depression (1974)
- The Act of Marriage: The Beauty of Sexual Love (1976, with Beverly LaHaye)
- Opposites Attract (1977)
- Understand Your Man: Secrets of the Male Temperament (1977)
- Understanding the Male Temperament (1977)
- Six Keys to a Happy Marriage (1978)
- Spirit-Controlled Family Living (1978)
- The Unhappy Gays: What Everyone Should Know About Homosexuality (1978)
- Your Temperament Can Be Changed (1978)
- Anger Is a Choice (1982, with Dr. Bob Phillips, Ph.D)
- How to Manage Pressure Before Pressure Manages You (1983)
- Increase Your Personality Power (1984)
- Practical Answers to Common Questions about Sex in Marriage (1984)
- The Coming Peace in the Middle East (1984)
- Your Temperament: Discover Its Potential (1984)
- What Lovemaking Means to a... series:
  1. What Lovemaking Means to a Woman: Practical Advice to Married Women about Sex (1984)
  2. What Lovemaking Means to a Man: Practical Advice to Married Men about Sex (1984)
- Sex Education is for the Family (1985)
- Why You Act the Way You Do (1987)
- Finding the Will of God in a Crazy, Mixed-Up World (1989)
- If Ministers Fall, Can They Be Restored? (1990)
- Our Life Together (1990, with Richard Exley)
- I Love You, But Why Are We So Different?: Making the Most of Personality Differences in Your Marriage (1991)
- Raising Sexually Pure Kids: How to Prepare Your Children for The Act of Marriage (1993)
- Smart Money (1994, with Jerry Tuma)
- The Spirit-Filled Family: Expanded for the Challenges of Today (1995, with Beverly LaHaye)
- Gathering Lilies from Among the Thorns: Finding the Mate God Has for You (1998, with Beverly LaHaye)
- The Power of the Cross (1998)
- The Act of Marriage After 40 (2000, with Beverly LaHaye, Mike Yorkey)
- Soul Survivor series:
  1. Mind Siege: The Battle for the Truth (2000, with David A. Noebel)
  2. All the Rave (2002, with Bob DeMoss)
  3. The Last Dance (2002, with Bob DeMoss)
  4. Black Friday (2003, with Bob DeMoss)
- Perhaps Today: Living Everyday in the Light of Christ's Return (2001, with Jerry B. Jenkins)
- The Transparent Leader: Spiritual Secrets of Nineteen Successful Men (2001, with Dwight L. Johnson, Dean Nelson)
- Heart Attacked: How to Keep and Guard Your Heart for God (2002, with Ed Hindson)
- Seduction of the Heart (2002, with Ed Hindson)
- Embracing Eternity: Living Each Day with a Heart Toward Heaven (2004, with Jerry B. Jenkins, Frank M. Martin)
- Jesus and the Hope of His Coming (2004, with Jerry B. Jenkins)
- Turn Your Life Around: Break Free from Your Past to a New and Better You (2006, with Tim Clinton)
- The Essential Guide to Bible Prophecy: 13 Keys to Understanding the End Times (2012, with Ed Hindson)
- A Quick Look at the Rapture and the Second Coming (2013)

History:

- Faith of Our Founding Fathers (1987)
- Hitler, God & the Bible (2012, with Ray Comfort)

Politics

- The Hidden Censors (1984)

Religion

- Revelation Unveiled (1973)
- Revelation: Illustrated and Made Plain (1973)
- How to Study the Bible for Yourself (1976)
- The Ark on Ararat (1976, with John D. Morris)
- Life in the Afterlife: What Really Happens After Death? (1980)

- The Battle for the Mind/Family series:
  1. The Battle for the Mind (1980)
  2. The Battle for the Family (1981)
- The Battle for the Public Schools (1982)
- The Race for the 21st Century (1986)
- Who Will Face the Tribulation?: How to Prepare for the Rapture and Christ's Return (1992)
- Understanding Bible Prophecy for Yourself (1992)
- Jesus: Who Is He? (1996)
- Understanding the Last Days (1998)
- Bible Prophecy: What You Need to Know (1999)
- Are We Living in the End Times? (1999, with Jerry B. Jenkins)
- Tim LaHaye Prophecy Study Bible (2000)
- The Complete Bible Prophecy Chart (2001, with Thomas Ice)
- The Merciful God of Prophecy: His Loving Plan for You in the End Times (2002)
- End Times Controversy: The Second Coming Under Attack (2003)
- God Always Keeps His Promises (2003, with Jerry B. Jenkins)
- The Promise of Heaven (2003, with Jerry B. Jenkins)
- These Will Not Be Left Behind: Incredible Stories of Lives Transformed After Reading the Left Behind Novels (2003, with Jerry B. Jenkins)
- A Kid's Guide to Understanding the End Times (2004, with Jerry B. Jenkins, Chris Fabry)
- Jesus Is Coming Soon!: A Kid's Guide to Bible Prophecy and the End Times (2004, with Jerry B. Jenkins)
- Why Believe in Jesus? (2004)
- The Authorized Left Behind Handbook (2005, with Jerry B. Jenkins, Sandi L. Swanson)
- The Best Christmas Gift (2005, with Greg Dinallo, Gregory S. Dinallo)
- A Party of Two: The Dating, Marriage, and Family Guide, AKA Party of Two: Lessons for Staying in Step in Dating, Marriage, and Family Life (2006, with Beverly LaHaye)
- The Popular Bible Prophecy Workbook: An Interactive Guide to Understanding the End Times (2006, with Ed Hindson)
- Global Warning: Are We on the Brink of World War III? (2007, with Ed Hindson)
- The Popular Bible Prophecy Commentary: Understanding the Meaning of Every Prophetic Passage (2007, with Ed Hindson)
- Jesus: Why the World Is Still Fascinated by Him (2009)
- The Book of Revelation Made Clear: A Down-to-Earth Guide to Understanding the Most Mysterious Book of the Bible (2014, with Timothy E. Parker)
- Target Israel: Caught in the Crosshairs of the End Times (2015, with Ed Hindson)
- Bible Prophecy for Everyone: What You Need to Know About the End Times (2016)
- Who Will Face the Tribulation?: How to Prepare for the Rapture and Christ's Return (2016)

== See also ==
- Christian eschatology
