= Shadow Mountain Community Church =

- Shadow Mountain Community Church
- 32°48′15.84″N 116°54′18.63″W
- Country: United States
- Denomination: Baptist
- Website: shadowmountain.org

History
- Founded: 1909

Architecture
- Style: Spanish

Administration
- Division: California Southern Baptist Convention

Shadow Mountain Community Church is a Baptist megachurch in El Cajon, a city in San Diego County, California, and is affiliated with the Southern Baptist Convention.

== History ==
The congregation held its first meeting in 1909. Originally meeting in a house located on the corner of 41st Street and Adams Avenue, the church was formally established in 1912 as Scott Memorial Baptist Church in North Park, San Diego. This name honored U.S. Army chaplain Winfield Scott. In 1936, Rev. Arthur F. Colver assumed the pastorate. Following significant growth, Scott Memorial East was established in El Cajon on Greenfield Drive in the 1950s. The congregation was later renamed Shadow Mountain Community Church. The original Scott Memorial Baptist Church in North Park was renamed Scott Memorial Community Church and later became Grace Church San Diego. For 25 years, the church was led by senior pastor and best-selling author Tim LaHaye, who came to San Diego in 1956. David Jeremiah succeeded LaHaye as senior pastor in 1981; in 1982 he launched an international radio and television ministry called Turning Point Ministry.

In 2014, Shadow Mountain Church merged with the former Grace Baptist Church in San Diego's North Park neighborhood and made it into an auxiliary campus named North Park Campus. As of December 2022 the church has eleven auxiliary campuses: one in El Cajon, two in San Diego, one in Encinitas, one in Chula Vista, and one in Alpine.

== Ministries ==
The main ministry of Shadow Mountain Community Church is their Sunday service, regularly bringing in over 10,000 people a week. Another large ministry is "Mountain High Kids," the children's ministry. It is run by about a dozen full-time employees, and about 100 volunteers. Other ministries for minors include the "CREW" middle school ministry and "The Gathering" high school ministry. The church also has multiple foreign-language ministries, including a Spanish-speaking ministry, a Filipino congregation, an Iraqi ministry, and several others.

Pastor Dr. David Jeremiah records his sermons for his radio program called Turning Point."
