= 2018 Movieguide Awards =

Annual American movie and television awards

The 2018 Movieguide Awards ceremony honored the best films and television of 2017.

== Winners and nominees ==
Winners are listed first, highlighted in boldface, and indicated with a double dagger (‡).

**Epiphany Prize for Most Inspiring Movie** - Honoring movies that are wholesome, spiritually uplifting and inspirational	**Epiphany Prize for Most Inspiring TV Program**
**The Star**‡; All Saints; Bitter Harvest; The Boss Baby; The Case for Christ; Let There Be Light; The Promise	**The Long Road Home: Episode 2: "Black Sunday, Part 2"**‡; Blue Bloods: Episode 8.1: "Cutting Losses"; The Crown: Episode 2.6: "Vergangenheit"; Last Man Standing: Episode 6.18: "Take Me to Church"; Little Big Shots: Episode 2.6: "Tiny Dancer"; Victoria: Episodes 1.5 and 1.6: "An Ordinary Woman" and "The Queen's Husband"
**Faith and Freedom Award for Movies** - Honoring movies that promote positive American values	**Faith and Freedom Award for TV**
**The Promise**‡; Bitter Harvest; The Boss Baby; Darkest Hour; Dunkirk; The Lego Batman Movie; Wonder	**The Long Road Home: Episode 2: "Black Sunday, Part 2"**‡; Blue Bloods: Episode 8.1: "Cutting Losses"; The Crown: Episode 2.6: "Vergangenheit"; Five Came Back; The Middle: Episode 9.9: "The 200th"; Victoria: Episodes 1.5 and 1.6: "An Ordinary Woman" and "The Queen's Husband"
**Best Movie for Families**	**Best Movie for Mature Audiences**
**The Boss Baby**‡; Cars 3; The Case For Christ; Despicable Me 3; The Emoji Movie; Ferdinand; The Lego Batman Movie; The Man Who Invented Christmas; Smurfs: The Lost Village; The Star	**Darkest Hour**‡; All Saints; Bitter Harvest; Dunkirk; Justice League; Pirates of the Caribbean: Dead Men Tell No Tales; The Promise; Thor: Ragnarok; Wonder; Wonder Woman
**Grace Award for Most Inspiring Performance for Movies**	**Grace Award for Most Inspiring Performance for TV**
**John Corbett - All Saints**‡; Erika Christensen - The Case For Christ; Oscar Isaac - The Promise; Kevin Sorbo - Let There Be Light; Sam Sorbo - Let There Be Light; Terence Stamp - Bitter Harvest; Dan Stevens - The Man Who Invented Christmas; Mike Vogel - The Case For Christ	**Paul Sparks - The Crown: Episode 2.6: "Vergangenheit"**‡; Claire Foy - The Crown: Episode 2.6: "Vergangenheit"; Tim Allen - Last Man Standing: Episode 6.18: "Take Me to Church"; Bill Engvall - Last Man Standing: Episode 6.18: "Take Me to Church"; Len Cariou - Blue Bloods: Episode 8.1: "Cutting Losses"; Tom Selleck - Blue Bloods: Episode 8.1: "Cutting Losses"; Jenna Coleman - Victoria: Episodes 1.5 and 1.6: "An Ordinary Woman" and "The Queen's Husband"; Tom Hughes - Victoria: Episodes 1.5 and 1.6: "An Ordinary Woman" and "The Queen's Husband"; Steve Harvey - Little Big Shots: Episode 2.6: "Tiny Dancer"; Michael Kelly - The Long Road Home: Episode 2: "Black Sunday, Part 2"
