= Terms of Endearment (disambiguation) =

A term of endearment is a word or phrase used to address and/or describe a person or animal for which the speaker feels love or affection.

Terms of Endearment may also refer to:

- Terms of Endearment (novel), by Larry McMurtry, 1975
  - Terms of Endearment, a film based on the novel, 1983
  - Terms of Endearment (play), a stage play adapted from the novel
- "Terms of Endearment" (The X-Files), a 1999 episode of The X-Files
- "Terms of Endearment" (Drawn Together episode), 2005

== See also ==
- "Partial Terms of Endearment" (2010), an episode of Family Guy
