= Giving Candy to Strangers =

2015 book by Stan Holden

- First edition
- Author: Stan Holden
- Language: English
- Genre: Business
- Published: 2015
- Publisher: Next Century Publishing
- Media type: Paperback
- ISBN: 9781629038575

Growing Your Business Can be as Fun & Easy as... Giving Candy to Strangers, Tips for Creating Abundance through Heart-Centered Sales is a self-help book about running businesses. The book was written by creative director Stan Holden, who has been featured on the PBS TV series The American Health Journal.

Giving Candy to Strangers contains information about creating relationships on social media, how emotions play into the process of sales, mixing business with pleasure and creating connections without an agenda. The foreword was written by Kevin Sorbo.

When Holden started writing Giving Candy To Strangers he decided to design the cover himself because of his experience as a graphic artist.
