= Miracle in East Texas =

2019 American Western comedy film

- Theatrical release poster
- Directed by: Kevin Sorbo
- Written by: Dan Gordon
- Based on: The story of the East Texas Oil Field discovery by C. M. "Dad" Joiner and Malcolm Crim
- Produced by: Kevin Sorbo; Sam Sorbo; James Quattrochi; Dan Gordon
- Starring: Kevin Sorbo; John Ratzenberger; Sam Sorbo; Louis Gossett Jr.; Tyler Mane
- Cinematography: Mike Staniforth
- Edited by: M.J. Pawat
- Music by: Joe P. Carr
- Production company: Sorbo Studios
- Distributed by: Purdie Distribution; Fathom Events
- Release dates: October 20, 2019 (Heartland International Film Festival); October 29, 2023 (U.S.)
- Running time: 98 minutes
- Country: United States
- Language: English

Miracle in East Texas is a 2019 American Western comedy film directed by Kevin Sorbo and written by Dan Gordon. The film is inspired by the true story of the East Texas Oil Field discovery in 1930 by wildcatter C. M. "Dad" Joiner, and Malcolm Crim. It stars Sorbo, John Ratzenberger, Sam Sorbo, Louis Gossett Jr., and Tyler Mane. The plot follows two con artists during the Great Depression who attempt to swindle a group of widows by drilling for oil on worthless land, only to accidentally strike the largest oil reserve in history.

The film was produced by Sorbo's own production company, Sorbo Studios. Though set in East Texas, principal photography took place in and around Calgary, Alberta, Canada.

Miracle in East Texas premiered at the Heartland International Film Festival on October 20, 2019, where it won the "Audience Choice Award - Narrative Feature." After several years of seeking wider distribution, the film was released in select theaters in the United States through Fathom Events on October 29 and 30, 2023.

== Historical Basis ==
The film is based on the real-life events surrounding the discovery of the East Texas Oil Field, the largest and most prolific oil reservoir in the contiguous United States at the time. In 1930, near Kilgore, a 70-year-old wildcatter named Columbus Marion Joiner, known as "Dad" Joiner, was on the verge of financial ruin. He had drilled two dry holes and was heavily in debt.

Many geologists and major oil companies believed there was no significant oil in the area. Joiner, however, persisted, financing his drilling operation by selling interests in his leases to local investors, a practice known as syndication. Some historians note that Joiner often oversold shares in his wells, a fraudulent practice that put him in constant legal and financial peril.

On October 3, 1930, Joiner's third well, the Daisy Bradford No. 3, struck oil, erupting as a massive gusher. The discovery defied expert predictions and triggered the East Texas oil boom, transforming the region, causing the population of towns like Kilgore to explode from a few hundred to over 10,000 in days. Despite being celebrated as the "father" of the field, Joiner's questionable financial dealings caught up with him. Beset by lawsuits from investors, he eventually sold his leases, including the discovery well, to oil magnate H. L. Hunt for over $1 million. Joiner died in 1947 with very little of his fortune left. The story of a down-on-his-luck, charismatic wildcatter making a monumental discovery through a combination of persistence and dubious methods forms the foundation for the film's plot.

Following C.M. "Dad" Joiner's October 1930 oil strike at Daisy Bradford #3 near Henderson, Malcolm Crim directed drilling operations on his mother Lou Della Crim's property at Laird Hill. On December 28, 1930, the Bateman-Crim Wildcat Well No. 1 (also known as Lou Della Crim No. 1) blew in just outside the front porch of the Lou Della Crim House, producing 20,000 barrels daily and confirming the oilfield's extension into Kilgore. This discovery triggered an unprecedented population explosion from approximately 700 to over 10,000 within days.

The sudden influx of workers created severe civic strain, with makeshift settlements like Happy Hollow (now Kilgore City Park) emerging as centers of lawlessness. Described as "both sides of town being the wrong side of the tracks," Kilgore experienced rampant crime, vice, and makeshift housing including piano-crate dwellings. Texas Rangers were frequently summoned for peacekeeping, notably Ranger Bob Goss (later Kilgore Police Chief), who earned the nickname "The Shadow" for his law enforcement tactics.

== Plot ==
In 1931, during the Great Depression, two charming but fraudulent wildcatters, Doc Boyd and Dad Everett, travel from town to town in Oklahoma and Texas. Their scheme involves identifying lonely, recently widowed women who own land. They convince the widows to allow them to drill for oil, not asking for money from the landowner herself, but using her property to sell shares in the worthless well to other vulnerable widows in the community. After inevitably declaring the well a "dry hole," they move on to the next town before their investors can catch on.

After being run out of Oklahoma, they set their sights on the small town of Cornville in East Texas. They target a group of widows, using their charm and citing scripture to win their trust and investments. They begin drilling on the land of one of the widows, fully expecting it to be another dry hole. However, as they prepare to abandon the operation and flee with the money, the well unexpectedly strikes oil, unleashing a massive gusher.

The accidental discovery creates a dilemma for Doc and Dad. They can either expose their scam and claim the fortune as legitimate oilmen, which would almost certainly land them in jail for fraud, or they can disappear and let others profit. Their situation is complicated when some of their previous, angry investors arrive seeking revenge. As they navigate their newfound, perilous success, the con men are forced to confront their actions, leading to unforeseen consequences and a chance at redemption.

== Cast ==
- Kevin Sorbo as Doc Boyd, a charismatic snake oil salesman and con artist.
- John Ratzenberger as Dad Everett, an unlucky wildcatter who teams up with Doc.
- Sam Sorbo as a widow and one of the primary targets of the con men's scheme.
- Louis Gossett Jr. as Irving Tanner Jr., who narrates the story in a flashback.
- Tyler Mane as an angered investor seeking retribution.
- Paula Boudreau as a widow targeted by the con artists.
- Braeden Sorbo as a younger version of a main character.

== Production ==
The film was a long-term project for director and star Kevin Sorbo and writer Dan Gordon. It was produced through Sorbo's independent company, Sorbo Studios, which he runs with his wife, Sam Sorbo.

In an interview, Kevin Sorbo stated the film was shot over 18 days. Despite its East Texas setting, principal photography took place in the fall of 2017 in and around Calgary and Turner Valley in Alberta, Canada, chosen for its natural landscapes and production incentives. The film's financing model involved independent investors, similar in spirit to the oil syndication depicted in the movie.

== Release ==
Miracle in East Texas had its world premiere on October 20, 2019, at the Heartland International Film Festival in Indianapolis, Indiana. The film won the Audience Choice Award for Narrative Feature at the festival. It also screened at the Houston WorldFest, where it won the award for Best Christian Film, and the San Antonio Independent Film Festival, where it won Best Narrative Feature.

After its festival run, the film's widespread release was delayed. It was eventually picked up for a limited theatrical release by Purdie Distribution and Fathom Events. It was shown in select U.S. theaters for two nights on Sunday, October 29, and Monday, October 30, 2023.

== Reception ==
Critical reception for Miracle in East Texas was generally positive among faith-based and family-oriented reviewers. The film was awarded the Dove Seal of Approval by Dove.org, which praised its clear theme of redemption and forgiveness, calling it a "fun, tall tale, full of adventure, near-escapes, and genuine redemption." The reviewer noted that while the story was "slowly paced at times," the positive messages were effective.

Movieguide.org gave the film a positive review, calling it a "delightful comedy" with a "strong Christian, moral worldview." The review praised the performances and the "hilarious" plot twists that begin once the main characters arrive in East Texas, though it noted that the film starts slowly. Director Kevin Sorbo described the project as "one of those rare films that combines comedy, drama, a little romance, and real-life events," adding that the production was "thrilled with the film festival awards we have already received."
