= ZGI =

ZGI may refer to:

- The Zaki Gordon Institute, a school for independent film making in Sedona, Arizona
- Zork: Grand Inquisitor, a graphical adventure game released in 1997 for the IBM compatible PC and Apple Macintosh
- The Gods River Airport, (IATA: ZGI, ICAO: CZGI), located adjacent to Gods River, Manitoba, Canada
