= Ed and His Dead Mother =

- Theatrical release poster
- Directed by: Jonathan Wacks
- Written by: Chuck Hughes
- Produced by: William Christopher Gorog
- Starring: Steve Buscemi; Ned Beatty; John Glover; Miriam Margolyes; Sam Jenkins
- Cinematography: Francis Kenny
- Music by: Mason Daring
- Production company: ITC Entertainment
- Distributed by: ITC Entertainment
- Release date: November 17, 1993 (United States)
- Running time: 93 minutes
- Country: United States
- Language: English
- Budget: $1.8 million
- Box office: $673

Ed and His Dead Mother is a 1993 American dark comedy film starring Steve Buscemi, Miriam Margolyes, and Ned Beatty.

== Plot ==
Ed Chilton inherits his family's hardware store following the death of his beloved mother, Mabel. He lives with his maternal uncle, Benny, who appears to be happy that his annoying sister is out of his life. One morning, Ed is approached at work by salesman A. J. Pattle, who offers to resurrect Ed's mother for $1000. Ed is initially skeptical, but Pattle notes the fee need not be paid up front.

Ed accepts the offer, which disturbs Uncle Benny. Benny believes the act to be unethical. Over time, Mabel's behavior becomes increasingly bizarre and unacceptable. When she begins scaring the neighbors and chasing dogs with a knife, Ed is forced to admit that something is wrong.

Ed seeks help from Pattle, but the salesman wants more money. Eventually, Ed accepts that he must move on and let his mother die. Out of self-defense, he decapitates Mabel and later says goodbye to her, but the still living head bites him on the lip when he gives her a final kiss. Disgusted, he throws the head into the grave, finally free of his overbearing mother.

== Cast ==
- Steve Buscemi as Ed Chilton
- Ned Beatty as Uncle Benny
- John Glover as A. J. Pattle
- Miriam Margolyes as Mabel Chilton
- Sam Jenkins as Storm Reynolds
- Gary Farmer as Big Lar
- Jon Gries as Rob Sundheimer
- Robert Harvey as Mr. Anderson
- Rance Howard as Reverend Praxton
- Biff Yeager as Cop

== Release ==
ITC Entertainment released Ed and His Dead Mother to a single theater in Los Angeles. It made $673. Fox Entertainment Group released it on home video in January 1994, and Pathfinder Home Entertainment released it on DVD in June 2003.

== Reception ==
Rotten Tomatoes, a review aggregator, reports that 50% of six surveyed critics gave the film a positive review; the average rating is 5.4/10. Kevin Thomas of the Los Angeles Times wrote that "flat, uninspired direction" ruins the film despite the cast and script. Adam Tyner of DVD Talk rated it 2/5 stars and called it a "limp and lifeless" film that does not stack up to Dead Alive. Patrick Naugle of DVD Verdict called it a cult film that plays like a watered-down, PG-rated version of Dead Alive.

Conversely, Stina Chyn of Film Threat rated it 4/5 stars and called it "an eccentric gem". Author Glenn Kay wrote that the film initially frustrated horror film fans due to its lack of gore, but it offers "plenty of chuckles" to open-minded viewers.
