= Storm Rider (2013 film) =

- Film poster
- Directed by: Craig Clyde
- Screenplay by: Craig Clyde
- Story by: Bryce W. Fillmore
- Produced by: Bryce W. Fillmore
- Starring: Kevin Sorbo; Kristy Swanson; C. Thomas Howell
- Cinematography: Brandon Christensen
- Edited by: Cody Petersen
- Music by: Russ Whitelock
- Production company: Stone Five Studios
- Distributed by: ARC Entertainment
- Release date: October 22, 2013
- Running time: 90 minutes
- Country: United States
- Language: English

Storm Rider is a 2013 American drama film written and directed by Craig Clyde and starring Kevin Sorbo, Kristy Swanson and C. Thomas Howell. It was filmed in Wallsburg, Utah.

== Cast ==
- Kevin Sorbo as Sam Fielding
- Kristy Swanson as Jody Peterson
- Danielle Chuchran as Dani Fielding
- Jacob Buster as Jordan Fielding
- Darien Willardson as Kevin Winslow
- Sam Sorbo as Vanessa Fielding
- Terence Goodman as Cameron Winslow
- C. Thomas Howell as Mitch
- Sarah Bernstein as Brooke
- Jacque Grey as Marie Houghton
- Amanda Swanson as Addy Jane
- Joey Miyashima as Sheriff Kikuchi

== Reception ==
Edwin L. Carpenter of The Dove Foundation gave it a positive review, writing that it "is well worth your time." Tracy Moore of Common Sense Media gave the film two stars out of five.
