= Dan Gordon (screenwriter) =

Israeli-American writer and producer

- דן גורדון
- Born: May 5, 1947 (age 79); Southern California, U.S.
- Occupations: Writer; producer; director

Dan Gordon (Hebrew: דן גורדון; born May 5, 1947) is an Israeli-American writer, producer and director.

As a screenwriter, he has written films including Wyatt Earp, Passenger 57, Murder in the First, and The Hurricane, and developed the story for Rambo: Last Blood. He has been the producer, screenwriter and story editor for over 200 hours of television, including Highway to Heaven, Highlander, and Soldier of Fortune, Inc. He has also written stage adaptations of Terms of Endearment and Rain Man, and novels based on his screenplays as well as his own experiences fighting in the Gaza War.

== Early life ==
Dan Gordon was born in Southern California, to a Jewish family. He grew up in Bell Gardens, CA, and at 16 went to Israel where he attended high school at the Ginegar kibbutz. After high school he returned to Southern California and studied at East LA Junior College for a year, before transferring to UCLA as a film and television major.

=== Military career ===
Gordon joined the Israeli Army in the early 1970s. He served for almost a decade, including during the Yom Kippur War of 1973.

He served as an escort officer in the Military Spokesperson's Unit during the 2006 Israel-Lebanon conflict.

He is a captain in the Israel Defense Forces Reserves.

== Film and television career ==
While at UCLA, Dan pitched a one-act play he had written, Once I Was, as a film to Universal Studios, and they hired him as a writer. But he was fired by Studio Chair Lew Wasserman for stealing office supplies.

In 1971, Gordon began directing the film Potluck, based on a screenplay he had written. They shot the film guerrilla style in New York, without obtaining film permits. As Gordon soon discovered, the film's independent financiers were Mafia-connected. Although the film was coming in under its $100,000 budget, they claimed the financing had dried up. Gordon and his collaborators tried to raise the funds to finish the film, but the Mafia needed the film to fail, as part of a money laundering scheme. The film was never finished.

Fearing the Mafia, due to the fallout from trying to make Potluck, Gordon fled to Israel, where he served in the Israeli Army. While there, he wrote the screenplay for Train Ride to Hollywood, the 1975 pop musical starring the Kansas City R&B band Bloodstone, though he would return briefly to the United States to rewrite it prior to filming. After more than a decade, Gordon returned to Hollywood to continue his screenwriting career in the early 1980s.

Gordon was hired to be the head writer for the TV show Highway to Heaven (1984–88), for which he also directed three episodes. He wanted to write for both film and television, which was uncommon at the time. Gordon went on to write numerous screenplays including Passenger 57 (1992), Wyatt Earp (1994), Murder in the First (1995), The Assignment (1997) and The Hurricane (1999). Gordon's most recent work includes a "story by" credit for Rambo: Last Blood (2019).

His play, Irena's Vow, premiered at the Baruch Performing Arts Center, New York, in September 2008. Starring Tovah Feldshuh, it is the true story of Irena Gut, who hid twelve Jews in a cellar during World War II. The play opened on Broadway at the Walter Kerr Theatre in previews starting March 10, 2009, officially March 29, 2009, with the same cast from off-Broadway. His stage adaptation of Barry Morrow's Rain Man premiered at the Apollo Theatre in London's West End in 2009, and was subsequently performed in Prague (Czech Republic), Stuttgart (Germany), Brussels (Belgium) and Utrecht (The Netherlands).

=== The Zaki Gordon Institute (ZGI) ===
Gordon is the co-founder of the Zaki Gordon Institute (ZGI), a film school in Sedona, Arizona. The institute is named for his eldest son, Zaki Gordon, who died in a traffic accident in 1998 at the age of 22 years. Gordon taught part-time at the institute. He also teaches at Columbia University School of the Arts, USC School of Cinematic Arts and UCLA School of Theater, Film, and Television, to which he donates an annual $5,000 prize to screenwriting students in honor of his son.

In 2012, he left the Zaki Gordon Institute after founding the Zaki Gordon Center for Cinematic Arts at Liberty University in 2011. After Gordon left, The Zaki Gordon Institute, in Arizona, changed its name to the Sedona Film School. Gordon was also a close friend of Tim Buckley, collaborating with him on an unfilmed movie script called "Fully Air-conditioned Inside." He also played the role of a homeless man in the independent film. Waiting for Mo (1996), which he produced with his son, Zaki, who wrote and directed the film.

He has been a member of the Directors Guild of America since 1985.

== Personal life ==
Gordon married his wife Jo-Ann while he was in Israel (and they divorced in 1995). They have three sons: Zaki, Yoni, and Adam. During the summer of 2019, Gordon married Leah Denmark in Rome in a small private ceremony.

Gordon is Jewish, and has acted as a keynote speaker at Jewish and Christian religious conferences.

== Filmography ==
=== Film ===
- Train Ride to Hollywood (1975)
- Tank (1984)
- Gotcha! (1985)
- Passenger 57 (1992)
- Surf Ninjas (1993) (also executive producer)
- Wyatt Earp (1994) (also executive producer)
- Murder in the First (1995)
- The Assignment (1997)
- The Hurricane (1999)
- The Celestine Prophecy (2006)
- Expecting Mary (2010) (also director)
- Let There Be Light (2017) (co-written with Sam Sorbo)
- Rambo: Last Blood (2019) (story by)
- Miracle in East Texas (2019)
- Heart of a Lion (2023)
- Irena's Vow (2023)
- Warrior Strong (2023)
- Just Play Dead (2026)

=== Television ===
- Highway to Heaven (1984) (also director)
- Gulag (1985) (also executive producer)
- Sidekicks (1987)
- Zorro (1989)
- Highlander: The Series (1992)
- Taking the Heat (1993)
- Nowhere to Hide (1994)
- New Eden (1994)
- Soldier of Fortune, Inc. (1997) (creator)
- Terror in the Mall (1998) (story)
- Roughnecks: Starship Troopers Chronicles (1999)
- October 7, 2023 (2024)

== Novels ==
- Wyatt Earp (1994)
- Murder in the First (1994)
- The Assignment (1997)
- Davin (with Zaki Gordon) (1997)
- Postcards from Heaven (2010)
- Day of the Dead: Book One - Gaza (2015)
- Day of the Dead: Book Two - America (2016)

== Plays ==
- Terms of Endearment (2007)
- Irena's Vow (2008)
- Rain Man (2009)
- Murder in the First (2012)
