= Craig Clyde =

American film director

- Other names: Craig L. Clyde
- Occupations: Actor, writer, director

Craig Clyde is an American actor, screenplay writer, and film director. He lives in Salt Lake City and is the father of K. C. Clyde. He is a member of the Church of Jesus Christ of Latter-day Saints.

Clyde is the cofounder of Majestic Entertainment Inc., a film production company based out of Utah. Currently Clyde and his son K.C. own Seerstone Entertainment. They write and produce independent films.

== Awards ==
- Five-time winner of the International "Telly" award, documentary division
- Grand Jury Award, Houston International Film Festival, America the Beautiful
- The Golden Camera, Chicago Industrial Film Festival, America the Beautiful
- Telly Award, America the Beautiful
- Silver Award, Houston International Film Festival, Wind Dancer
- Best Original Screenplay, Houston International Film Festival, Calico Jack
- Best Original Screenplay, Santa Clarita International Children's Film Festival, Calico Jack
- Gold Award (best theatrical film, small budget), Houston International Film Festival, Heaven Sent
- Gold Award (original screenplay), Charleston International Film Festival, The Steps of Coronado
- American Screenwriting Award Grand Prize (original screenplay), Nowhere Man

== Filmography ==
- The Time Machine (1978) - actor
- Beyond Death's Door (1979) - actor
- Hangar 18 (1980) - actor
- Earthbound (1981) - actor
- The Adventures of Nellie Bly (1981) - actor
- A Killer in the Family (1983) - actor
- In Search of a Golden Sky (1984) - actor
- Scorned and Swindled (1984) - actor
- Konrad (1985) - actor
- Evil in Clear River (1988) - actor
- Mothers, Daughters and Lovers (1989) - actor
- Blood Games (1990) - writer
- The Witching of Ben Wagner (1990) - actor
- Tripwire (1990) - actor
- China O'Brien II (1991) - writer
- Little Heroes (1992) - actor and director
- In the Line of Duty: Siege at Marion (1992) - actor
- Deliver Them from Evil: The Taking of Alta View (1992) - actor
- The Legend of Wolf Mountain (1992) - writer and director
- Wind Dancer (1993) - actor, writer and director
- Heaven Sent (1994) - writer and director
- In the Shadow of Evil (1995) - actor
- It Was Him or Us (1995) - actor
- Terror in the Family (1996) - actor
- Not in This Town (1997) - actor
- Truth or Consequences, N.M. (1997) - actor
- Walking Thunder (1997) - writer and director
- The Long Road Home (1999) - actor, writer, and director
- A Dog's Tale (1999) - writer and director
- Castle Rock (2000) - actor, writer, and director
- Perfect Murder, Perfect Town (2000) - actor
- No Place Like Home (2001) - writer and director
- I Saw Mommy Kissing Santa Claus (2002) - actor
- Alikes (2002) - actor
- Miracle Dogs (2003) - writer and director
- The Book of Mormon Movie, Vol. 1: The Journey (2003) - writer
- The Adventures of Young Van Helsing: The Quest for the Lost Scepter (2004) - writer
- The Derby Stallion (2005) - director
- Propensity (2006) - actor
- Believe (2007) - actor
- The Family Holiday (2007) - writer and director
- One Man's Treasure (2009) - writer
- The Wild Stallion (2009) - writer and director
- A Christmas Wish (2010) - writer and director
- Storm Rider (2013) - writer and director
