= The Long Road Home (film) =

- Written by: Craig Clyde
- Directed by: Craig Clyde
- Starring: Michael Ansara; T.J. Lowther; Mary Elizabeth Winstead; Al Harrington; Craig Clyde
- Music by: John Scott
- Country of origin: United States
- Original language: English

Production
- Producers: Bryce Fillmore; David Gowdy; Wayne Lewis; Robert Tremblay
- Cinematography: Gary Eckert
- Editor: Lori Petersen
- Running time: 88 minutes

Original release
- Release: 1999

The Long Road Home is a 1999 American television film, directed and written by Craig Clyde. It stars Michael Ansara (in his final film role before his death in 2013), T.J. Lowther and Mary Elizabeth Winstead. The film tells the story of a city boy's life after having to live with his grandparents in a village, after the death of his parents.

== Plot ==
After his mother died, 12-year-old Seth George goes to live with his grandparents on their farm. Grouchy old Murdock is not very happy with the presence of his grandson and is rather hard on him. He was strongly opposed to the mixed marriage of his daughter and doesn't want to hear anything about Seth's Indian father, who died a hero in Vietnam when Seth was still a baby. His grandmother on the other hand was very fond of Seth but after a while she passes away. Seth also meets the charming yet sporting Annie Jacobs. Seth struggles at the farm with his grumpy grandfather and strives to win Annie's heart at the same time.

== Cast ==
- Michael Ansara as Murdock Haynes
- T.J. Lowther as Seth George
- Mary Elizabeth Winstead as Annie Jacobs
- Sandra Shotwell as Neldra Haynes
- Al Harrington as Andy Lamebull
- Craig Clyde as Jim Jacobs
- Joyce Cohen as Missy Jacobs
- K.C. Clyde as Rob Taylor
