= Rodeo Girl =

2016 film

Rodeo Girl (2016) is a feature-length film starring Kevin Sorbo, Sophie Bolen and Derek Brandon. It follows the story of a young girl and her horse as they transition from English-style riding to barrel racing. The film was produced by Joel Paul Reisig, Lucas Miles and Brian Harrington, and distributed by Vertical Entertainment.

== See also ==
- List of films about horses
