= Braeden Sorbo =

American actor

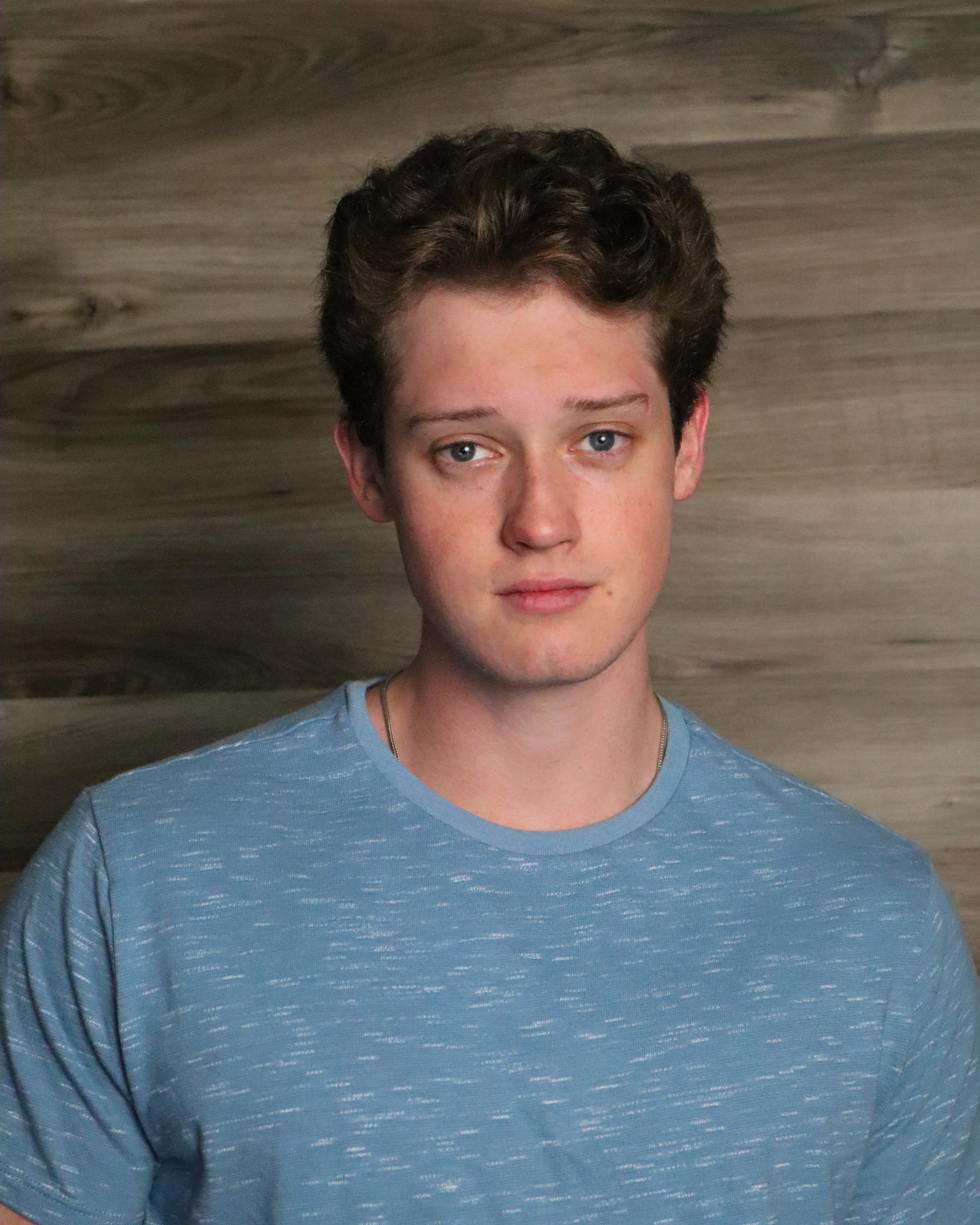
- Sorbo in 2023
- Born: Braeden Cooper Sorbo; August 22, 2001 (age 25); Henderson, Nevada, U.S.
- Occupation: Actor
- Years active: 2017–present
- Spouse: Olivia Krolczyk (m. 2026)
- Parents: Kevin Sorbo (father); Sam Sorbo (mother)

Braeden Cooper Sorbo (born August 22, 2001) is an American actor. He is the son of actor Kevin Sorbo and actress Sam Sorbo.

== Filmography ==
| Year | Film | Role | Ref(s) |
|---|---|---|---|
| 2017 | Let There Be Light | Gus Harkens | |
| 2018 | Bernie the Dolphin | Digger | |
| 2019 | Miracle in East Texas | Matt | |
| 2023 | Left Behind: Rise of the Antichrist | Connor | |
| 2023 | Success Camp | Michael Adams | |
| 2023 | A Wave of Kindness | Lance Patterson | |
| 2024 | I Feel Fine. | Everett | |
| 2025 | Jesus Freaks | Josh | |
| 2025 | Cuisine de la 'Pocalypse | Gray | |

== Bibliography ==
- The BS Guide to Politics: Understanding Current Events Through Sarcasm (2021)
