= Sedona Film School =

Part of Yavapai College in Arizona

Coordinates: 34.850511°N 111.830300°W

The Sedona Film School (SFS), formerly the Zaki Gordon Institute for Independent Filmmaking (ZGI), is an accredited part of Yavapai College and a previous member of CILECT. It is located in Sedona, Arizona, United States.

== History ==
The school was founded in 2000 by screenwriter Dan Gordon and industry professional Stephan Schultze. The Institute was originally named for Gordon's eldest son, Zaki Gordon, an independent film maker who died at age 22. In 2012, it changed its name to the Sedona Film School, in response to Gordon leaving the school.

In 2013, Yavapai College announced the temporary closure of the Sedona Film School while its curriculum was updated. The updated program began admitting students in Fall 2015 as the Film and Media Arts Program.

== Programs ==
The school offers film making courses in narrative and occasionally documentary programs (If student enrollment is of sufficient numbers), and previously offered a second year advanced program in which students and faculty produce a full-length feature film.
