= Avenging Angel (2007 film) =

2007 TV film

- VHS cover
- Written by: William Sims Myers
- Directed by: David S. Cass Sr.
- Starring: Kevin Sorbo; Cynthia Watros; Richard Lee Jackson; Wings Hauser; Joey King
- Theme music composer: Joe Kraemer
- Country of origin: United States
- Original language: English

Production
- Executive producers: Larry Levinson; Robert Halmi, Jr.
- Producers: Randy Pope; Lincoln Lageson
- Cinematography: Maximo Munzi
- Editor: Craig Bassett
- Running time: 81 minutes (2-hour Time Slot)
- Production companies: Alpine Meiden; Larry Levinson Productions; RHI Entertainment
- Budget: $2.2 million

Original release
- Network: Hallmark Channel
- Release: July 7, 2007

Avenging Angel is a 2007 American TV Western film directed by David S. Cass Sr. and starring Kevin Sorbo. It originally aired on Hallmark Channel on July 7, 2007, as part of the network's "Western Month". It was filmed at Simi Valley, California, Sable Ranch in Santa Clarita, California as well as Vasquez Rocks Natural Area Park in Agua Dulce, California.

== Plot ==
A preacher (Kevin Sorbo) witnesses his family and a group of refugees seeking shelter in his church murdered by a gang of ruthless outlaws led by Colonel Cusack (Wings Hauser). After his wife makes him promise to never seek revenge, he instead becomes a bounty hunter. When he steps in to defend a woman in a saloon, the bad guy and his two friends (who happen to be allied with The Colonel), give him a beating and toss him into the street.

A woman with a "past", named Maggie (Cynthia Watros), takes him in to care for him. He stays in her extra room, but she insists he give up his gun while at her home because she has a daughter.

The local sheriff, on Cusacks's payroll, is meanwhile trying to run off some squatters. The Sheriff's gang attempts to intimidate the squatters, but once The Preacher learns of the Sheriff's and The Colonel's dealings, he visits the squatters, who tell him they paid for the land but never got the deed. A few days later the Sheriff's posse burns down a few of the squatter's tents.

The Preacher attempts to negotiate peacefully with the Sheriff, and so visits Cusack. Cusack tries to persuade The Preacher to join his mob, which he refuses. The Sheriff then sends a message to The Preacher by having some of his men rough up Maggie. Unarmed still because of his agreement with Maggie, The Preacher catches the gang in the act and overcomes one of the men's guns, scaring the men off.

The Preacher gets his gun back from Maggie and sets out to visit the Squatters again, and is met by the Sheriff and some of his gang. The Preacher, now armed, tells the Sheriff that the squatters have a right to stay. Gunfire ensues, and The Preacher shoots the sheriff. The rest of the bad guys run off.

The Preacher then pays a visit to Cusack for a final showdown, and obtains the deed for the squatters. As he turns to leave, having satisfied his purpose for the visit, the Colonel tries to shoot him, but The Preacher is faster and kills Cusack. The Preacher returns to Maggie and her daughter.

== Cast ==
- Kevin Sorbo as The Preacher
- Nick Chinlund as Quinn
- Cynthia Watros as Maggie
- Richard Lee Jackson as Billy
- Wings Hauser as Colonel Cusack
- Joey King as Amelia
- Brad Carter as Gunman #2
- Jim Haynie as Elijah

The production designer was Scott H. Campbell, while casting was handled by Penny Perry and Amy Reese.

== Reception ==
Avenging Angel did moderately well for Hallmark Channel when it premiered. The film scored a 2.6 household rating, making it the highest-rated ad supported cable movie for the day. A reviewer at Chud.com called it:

A standard yarn about revenge by a man wearing the cloth in Jesus' name. A shame this sort of story has been told many times before and done better...The one thing this movie has going for it is Sorbo does turn in a decent performance and he is the only reason Avenging Angel is worth watching, although I might be pushing the envelope with that endorsement.

However, TrailerFan.com wrote that "Avenging Angel delivers the goods at point-blank range." The Variety review found it to be unoriginal stating "'Avenging Angel' feels less written than simply stitched together from pieces of classic oaters, without stretching much meat over those old bones."
