= Sam Sorbo =

American actress

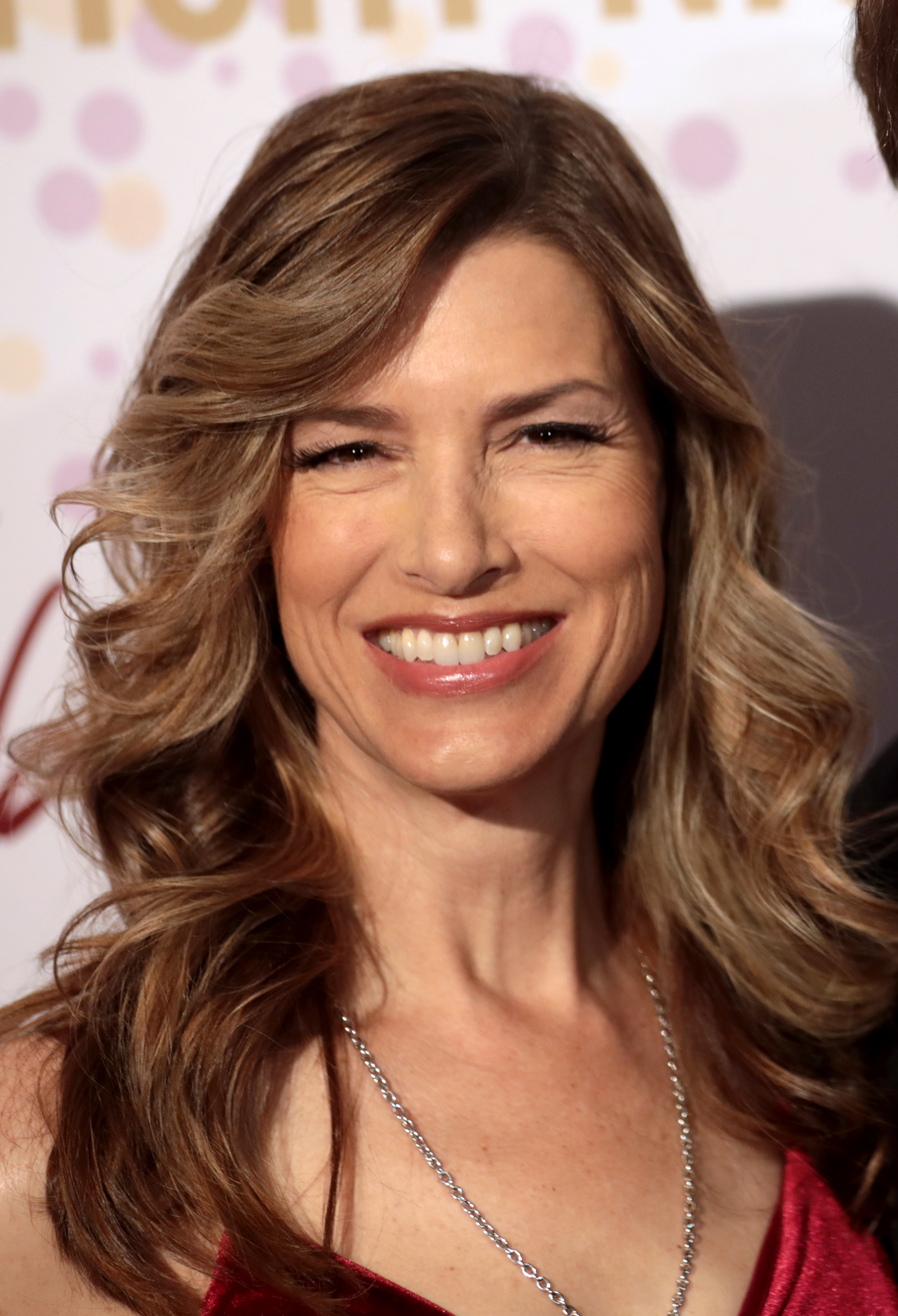
- Sorbo in 2022
- Born: Sandra Lynn Jenkins; October 18, 1964 (age 61)
- Other name: Sam Jenkins
- Occupations: Actress; talk radio host
- Years active: 1987–present
- Spouse: Kevin Sorbo (m. 1998)
- Children: 3, including Braeden

Sandra Lynn "Sam" Sorbo (née Jenkins; born October 18, 1964) is an American actress. She played Serena in the television series Hercules: The Legendary Journeys and hosts the weekday, syndicated radio program, The Sam Sorbo Show.

== Career ==
Under her maiden name, Jenkins, Sorbo played Serena on the TV series Hercules: The Legendary Journeys. Serena is a recurring love interest for Hercules.

Under her married name, Sorbo hosts a weekday radio show, The Sam Sorbo Show, syndicated nationwide by Mojo 5-0 Radio. She also co-hosts Flashpoint Live, a weekly radio news magazine.

== Personal life ==
Sorbo studied Biomedical Engineering at Duke University, but decided to pursue modeling and acting afterwards. Sam married actor Kevin Sorbo on January 5, 1998. They met the previous year when she had a small recurring role on Hercules (Season 3, Episode 8 "Prince Hercules"). They have three children whom they homeschooled; son Braeden Cooper (born 2001) is an actor and author. Sorbo is the spokesman and chair of A World Fit for Kids! (AWFFK!), a non-profit organization that trains teenagers to become mentors to younger children. Sorbo wrote They're Your Kids, a book that chronicles her family's experience with homeschooling. She publicly advocates homeschooling.

=== Politics ===
Sorbo has been a featured speaker on the ReAwaken America Tour, a series of events protesting COVID-19 mitigation measures and supporting Donald Trump's false claims of a stolen election.

== Filmography ==
Film
Year	Title	Role	Notes
1990	The Bonfire of the Vanities	Fox's Assistant	
1991	Night of the Warrior	Hooker	
1992	Obiettivo indiscreto	Claire	
1993	Twenty Bucks	Anna Holiday	
1993	Ed and His Dead Mother	Storm Reynolds	
1994	Fortunes of War	Johanna Pimmler	
1994	The Crew	Catherine Driftwood	
2001	Resolution	Paula	
2005	In a Dark Place	Paula	
2013	Storm Rider	Vanessa	
2014	Alongside Night	Cathryn Vreeland	
2015	Just Let Go	District Attorney	
2017	Let There Be Light	Katy Harkins	co-wrote screenplay with Dan Gordon
2018	Bernie the Dolphin	Sandy Pierce	
2023	Left Behind: Rise of the Antichrist	Amanda White	

Television
Year	Title	Role	Notes
1987	Napoleon and Josephine: A Love Story	Georgette	Episode: "1.3"
1990	Blaues Blut	Tuesday	Episode: "Das Mädchen aus dem Meer"
1990	Glory Days	Sherry	Episode: "The Kids Are Allright"
1994–1995	seaQuest DSV	Mariah	2 episodes
1995	Diagnosis: Murder	Ellen Kingston	Episode: "Playing for Keeps"
1996	JAG	Private Whitley	Episode: "Boot"
1996	The Sentinel	Isabel Kane	Episode: "Night Train"
1996	Chicago Hope	Dr. Caroline Eggert	8 episodes
1996–99	Hercules: The Legendary Journeys	Princess Kirin; Serena	Episode: "Prince Hercules"; 5 episodes
2000-01	Andromeda	Dr. Sara Riley	2 episodes
2001	Tatort	Esther	Episode: "Nichts mehr im Griff"
2007	Avenging Angel	Sarah	TV movie
