= Blue Bloods season 8 =

Season of television series

Blue Bloods
- Season 8
- Season 8 U.S. DVD cover
- No. of episodes: 22

Release
- Original network: CBS
- Original release: September 29, 2017 – May 11, 2018

Season chronology
- ← Previous; Season 7 Next → Season 9

The eighth season of Blue Bloods, a police procedural drama series created by Robin Green and Mitchell Burgess, premiered on CBS September 29, 2017. The season contained 22 episodes and concluded on May 11, 2018.

== Cast ==
Donnie Wahlberg (Danny Reagan), Bridget Moynahan (Erin Reagan), Will Estes (Jamie Reagan), and Len Cariou (Henry Reagan) are first credited. Sami Gayle (Nicky Reagan-Boyle) is credited next, marking the fourth season she has been included in the opening credits. Tom Selleck (Frank Reagan) receives an "and" billing at the close of the main title sequence. Amy Carlson (Linda Reagan) left between Seasons 7 and 8.

Marisa Ramirez, as Danny's partner Detective Maria Baez, and Vanessa Ray, as Jamie's partner Eddie Janko, continue to receive "also starring" billing for season 8. Appearing regularly and receiving "special guest star" billing are Gregory Jbara as Deputy Commissioner of Public Information Garrett Moore, Robert Clohessy as Lt. Sidney Gormley, and Abigail Hawk as Detective Abigail Baker, Frank's primary aide.

=== Main ===
- Tom Selleck as NYPD Police Commissioner Francis "Frank" Reagan
- Donnie Wahlberg as Detective 1st Grade Daniel "Danny" Reagan
- Bridget Moynahan as ADA Erin Reagan
- Will Estes as Officer Jamison "Jamie" Reagan
- Len Cariou as New York City Police Commissioner Henry Reagan (Retired)
- Sami Gayle as Nicole "Nicky" Reagan-Boyle
- Marisa Ramirez as Detective 1st Grade Maria Baez
- Vanessa Ray as Officer Edit "Eddie" Janko

=== Recurring ===
- Abigail Hawk as Detective 1st Grade Abigail Baker
- Gregory Jbara as Deputy Commissioner of Public Information Garrett Moore
- Robert Clohessy as Lieutenant Sidney "Sid" Gormley
- Steve Schirripa as DA Investigator Anthony Abetemarco
- Peter Hermann as Jack Boyle
- Bebe Neuwirth as Kelly Peterson
- Tony Terraciano as Jack Reagan
- Andrew Terraciano as Sean Regan
- Treat Williams as Lenny Ross
- Stacy Keach as Archbishop Kearns

=== Guest ===
- Whoopi Goldberg as Regina Thomas
- Jack Schlossberg as Officer Jack Hammer
- Nick Cordero as Victor Lugo
- Frances Turner as Janay Brown

== Episodes ==
No. overall	No. in season	Title	Directed by	Written by	Original release date	Prod. code	U.S. viewers (millions)
156	1	"Cutting Losses"	David M. Barrett	Siobhan Byrne O'Connor	September 29, 2017	801	10.04
Erin pleads with Danny, who has been contemplating retirement since Linda's death in a rescue helicopter crash, to help her with a case involving her ex-husband, Jack (Peter Hermann) who's been attacked in his office. The person responsible turns out to be the man Erin unsuccessfully prosecuted and Jack defended, and Danny is provoked into lunging at him after he brings up the date May 28, the date of Linda's death. In a therapy session, a visibly emotional Danny blames himself for Linda's death due to not being home more often. The rest of the Reagans later surprise Danny and his two sons with a new house to replace the one burned down recently. Meanwhile, Jamie and Eddie go undercover as a couple to bust a shady drug dealer after they respond to a call regarding multiple overdoses at a club. Acting mayor Margaret Dutton (Lorraine Bracco) butts heads with Frank when an officer shoots an unarmed perp, who was drunk and belligerent at the time of the incident; the officer resigns after Mayor Dutton appears to blame him for using unnecessary force, despite having never discharged his weapon in the line of duty up until that point. Frank refuses Mayor Dutton's direct order to release records pertaining to the officer's service to the public. As a result, Mayor Dutton fires him, although it is revealed that, as the public advocate filling in, she cannot do so. Note: Nominated for the Movieguide Awards.
157	2	"Ghosts of the Past"	John Behring	Kevin Riley	October 6, 2017	803	9.49
Frank receives an order from the mayor to attend the annual West Indies parade, which this year is honoring a man who served time for conspiring in an attack against the police. Baker is especially perturbed by this request and asks Frank not to attend. Meanwhile, Danny and Maria investigate the return of Selena Moore (Caroline Pluta), who suspiciously disappeared as a teen 13 years ago. The real missing teen, Leah Harris, was killed by her brother Luke, who also hired Selena to pose as Leah. Also, Jamie and Eddie try to help Andrea, a young woman they believe is being exploited by Congressman Richard Walters (Richard Thomas). Walters pulled some strings to get Andrea a work Visa, but he employed her without pay to be the face of his campaign.
158	3	"The Enemy of My Enemy"	Robert Harmon	Ian Biederman	October 13, 2017	802	8.98
Erin's case against human trafficker Chao Lin (Tia Carrere) faces difficulty when the presiding judge falls off a roof to his death. Danny and Baez, along with Anthony, investigate possible foul play as this particular case gets under Erin's skin. Although the judge was battling depression and having marital problems, Chao threatened to murder the family of the building's superintendent (who initially told the detectives he wasn't on the roof when the death occurred) to push the judge off the roof after said judge allowed evidence against Chao to be used in trial. Elsewhere, Frank's enhanced public safety initiative is opposed by Mayor Dutton, but gains a surprising ally: City Council Speaker Regina Thomas (Whoopi Goldberg), who has disagreed with Frank in the past (see episode 6x16 "Help Me Help You").
159	4	"Out of the Blue"	David M. Barrett	Brian Burns	October 20, 2017	804	9.08
Danny and Baez work the case of Arthur Hines, a detective who was gunned down prior to testifying against a career criminal. Hines's partner points toward Victor Lugo, who has an alibi. The detectives eventually learn that Hines's wife and his partner were having an affair, and they ordered the hit themselves. Also, Garrett and his wife Cynthia are attacked by an ESU team outside their home, and Frank personally investigates. In turns out that a blind teenager held a personal vendetta against Garrett for denying his request to be commissioner for a day (though it wasn't prejudiced as the young man thought) and prank-called ESU to get back at him. Elsewhere, Erin brings in a confidential informant against Anthony's wishes; the informant is Jimmy Pearson, Anthony's old friend who got mixed up with the mob, and he claims to have information that will take down Carlo Tomassi, a longtime crime boss that Erin had been trying to prosecute. Jimmy gets a confession on a wire, but Tomassi's lawyer threatens to leak the case to the press, saying the former girlfriend of both Tomassi and Jimmy complicates the case as being too personal to a confidential informant; Anthony resolves the case himself by arresting Jimmy as well, making him a co-defendant to make it appear that the case isn't personal to the prosecutors.
160	5	"The Forgotten"	Ralph Hemecker	Allie Solomon	October 27, 2017	805	8.29
Danny and Baez investigate the murder of Jessica, a single mother whose ex-husband David has a documented history of violence. Her eldest son Nick tells Danny that he hadn't spoken to his father in a year, but a subpoena for phone records shows that he called him upon finding Jessica's dead body. Danny finds out that Nick's mother urged him to lie about his father being abusive at the divorce hearing. Upon further investigation, Danny arrests the guilty party; a landscaper who attempted to steal from Jessica's home and was caught by the victim. Danny visits David afterward to confide in him about Linda's death, encouraging him to be there for his kids in the process. Also, Frank deals with the fallout when Mayor Dutton eliminates solitary confinement in prisons, leading to several prison riots (one of which results in an officer being stabbed). Though Dutton refuses to budge at first, she eventually relents and agrees to a compromise. Elsewhere, Jamie and Eddie happen upon a young woman who overdosed on heroin, causing a traffic jam. Jamie goes out of his way to grant her request to talk with her parents, but the girl subsequently drops dead in the precinct. Internal Affairs questions Jamie over his injecting the girl with naloxone to counter the heroin effects at the crime scene, to save her life. This causes Jamie to question his own judgment in the matter, but the girl's parents thank him for saving their daughter's life, if only for a short while.
161	6	"Brushed Off"	Eric Laneuville	Daniel Truly	November 3, 2017	806	9.27
When a famous basketball player is found dead of an apparent drug overdose, Danny and Maria look into his possible ties to a local drug gang, but his girlfriend (who is the mother of his young child) is responsible. Additionally, Danny and his sons (especially Sean) continue to cope with Linda's absence. While out at lunch, Erin is attacked by a woman who accuses her of "killing her husband", leading her to revisit the case of a man she may have wrongfully convicted of assault nine years ago. She tracks down a woman who testified against the man in court and finds that he is indeed innocent of the crime. Also, Frank is approached by Archbishop Kearns (Stacy Keach) regarding the eviction of an artist (Mimi Rogers) that vandalized police cars by hurling down cans of paint from her apartment window. Frank and the artist eventually agree on a compromise where she paints a portrait of him.
162	7	"Common Ground"	David M. Barrett	Siobhan Byrne O'Connor	November 10, 2017	807	9.94
A case turns personal for Danny when he works to protect a nurse, Faith Madson (Jessie Mueller), from her violent ex-boyfriend, Ray. Danny and Faith realize they have a lot in common and bond. Ray later arrives at the hospital Faith works at, shooting multiple workers and patients until he starts threatening to kill her. Danny saves Faith, who later visits him at his precinct to thank him for saving her life and to invite him to dinner. Danny politely turns down the invitation, saying he still feels like he's married. Meanwhile, Shelly Wayne (Cassandra Freeman), an acquaintance of Frank's, comes to him with a theory regarding the death of an inmate, where the prison guard is accused of sexual harassment. Frank's attempts to figure out the situation, but it backfires when Shelly openly accuses the NYPD of collusion and a cover-up. Also, Jamie and Eddie help deliver a baby, only to learn that the mother and her family are undocumented immigrants living in deplorable conditions. Eddie manages to get the father a job working as a building superintendent, which comes with a suitable apartment of their own.
163	8	"Pick Your Poison"	Heather Cappiello	Kevin Wade	November 17, 2017	808	9.25
Eddie's judgment is clouded by her past when she makes a questionable arrest of a man revealed to be a college acquaintance who once humiliated her in a frat house. The man failed to act when a bunch of frat boys posted sensitive photos of her, and his pleas to make peace with Eddie fall on deaf ears. However, he is beaten up by several other guys after he tries to intervene when they grope two young women at a bar, and Eddie calls it even. Frank learns one of his best lieutenants tested positive for marijuana after a trip to Colorado, and gets caught between department regulations and Mayor Dutton's stance on making pot legal. Meanwhile, Danny and Baez investigate a murder linked to a white supremacist group. The group's leader is a former cop who blames the job for making him a bigot, and although Danny successfully stops an impending confrontation between the two parties, the former cop and his crew are killed soon after.
164	9	"Pain Killers"	John Behring	Ian Biederman	December 1, 2017	809	8.84
As Danny and Baez join a narcotics task force to track down a drug supplier at a prep school, Baez comes into contact with fentanyl and is soon fighting for her life from an accidental overdose. While working the case to prevent any more overdoses, Danny also stays by Baez’s side and is there when she wakes up to recover. Also, Jamie and Eddie are assigned to protect a rehabilitated sex offender, Kenneth Tripp, whose neighbors are angry he lives in their apartment building. One of the neighbors, a father with young children, gets into a physical altercation with the man, making the Reagans consider and debate at Sunday dinner on how far they’d go to protect their family. Jamie and Erin visit Tripp to hear his side of the story, and Tripp admits to throwing the first punch after the other man made angry remarks towards him. Elsewhere, Frank forms an unlikely alliance with Mayor Dutton when Governor Mendez (David Zayas) refuses to involve the NYPD during a major state trooper initiative.
165	10	"Heavy is the Head"	David M. Barrett	Brian Burns	December 8, 2017	810	9.40
Erin is conflicted when Jamie and Eddie ask her to help drop an old auto robbery charges against Parker Mack (Spencer House), who just bravely rescued a woman from a local hostage situation. Erin's request is refused by the DA in Pennsylvania (where Parker lives and the robbery occurred), but Jamie secretly convinces him to change his mind by revealing Parker's heroic act to the press there. Meanwhile, Danny and Baez work a case involving car thieves and discover the leader is Victor Lugo (Nick Cordero), a mobster they've dealt with before. The victim refuses to give up any information about the criminals, and Danny's attempt to get Lugo to talk by showing his associate being interrogated by Baez backfires when Lugo's lawyer arrives; Danny then lies to Lugo, telling him over the phone that the truck driver his crew robbed picked him out of a photo array, enabling the detectives to ambush and arrest Lugo. Also, Baker receives a job offer from her old sergeant, who makes it appear as such that she requested a transfer though the opposite is true. However it is revealed that her sergeant only wants her because of her close ties with the commissioner.
166	11	"Second Chances"	Deran Sarafian	Kevin Riley	January 5, 2018	811	9.98
When a journalist disappears while working on an exposé about Ethan Goodwin (Roscoe Orman), an innocent man serving time for murder, Danny and Baez hope that re-examining the original case will help find her. The case takes a personal turn for Danny, as Jack is jumped while picking up pizza, and a note threatens Danny to stop his investigation and nothing will happen to the reporter. Surveillance shows a Mason Grant at the journalist's apartment right before her disappearance; in interrogation, Mason tells the detectives that Ethan's daughter Lauren is responsible for both the kidnapping and the old murder, and that it wasn't gang-related. Before the detectives can question Lauren, she commits suicide. Also, the son of a doctor Erin prosecuted for petty drug charges blames Erin for his falling off the wagon, as Erin had recommended rehab instead of jail time. They are ultimately forced to arrest the doctor when they find him stealing from a pharmacy. In a related matter, a video that contains a speech of Frank's that was digitally manipulated by audio hackers is leaked. The tape makes Frank out to agree with Erin's initiative to consider drug abuse as a disease first, and a crime second, though the opposite is true. Frank privately lets Erin know his true stance before coming forward publicly about it, but this only creates a rift between father and daughter.
167	12	"The Brave"	Thomas R. Moore	Siobhan Byrne O'Connor	January 12, 2018	812	10.17
Anthony is shot while interviewing a witness for an upcoming murder trial. Despite their differences, Danny takes up the case to find out who was responsible, telling Erin that Anthony is still "one of us". Anthony's bitter ex-wife also enters the picture, saying she wishes Anthony saw her like he sees Erin (as Anthony hopes his daughter grows up to be like Erin). After Danny brings the shooter to justice, he and Anthony put aside some of their animosity. Also, Jamie and Eddie get in the middle of a standoff between a police captain and a developmentally disabled man posing as an officer. Though Jamie calms the man down before anyone gets hurt, the captain lambasts Jamie in front of the entire precinct for being a Reagan and disobeying his order to stand down. As a result, Jamie is provoked into losing his temper, and he and Eddie are suspended a week for insubordination after she retaliates to the captain calling her Jamie's girlfriend. Elsewhere, Nicky prepares to take the police exam over her mom's objections.
168	13	"Erasing History"	Jane Raab	Daniel Truly	January 19, 2018	813	9.45
Henry goes into the city to run some errands when a car is headed straight for the shop he is visiting. He saves the life of a pregnant pedestrian whose husband is killed in the crash. Danny and Baez take the case, and they quickly find that it was a deliberate attempt to murder the victim. They get DNA from the driver, who is found dead in his apartment shortly afterwards. Henry's meddling in the case pushes Danny's buttons, and their argument continues into Sunday dinner. After they apologize to each other, Henry remembers an important piece of information that enables them to solve the case. Also, Nicky's activist friend, Chrissie (Naian Gonzalez Norvind), defaces the NYPD flag with red paint at One Police Plaza in a protest against police brutality, and Frank is further angered when Nicky seems to defend her. Her attempts to get Chrissie to cease her illegal acts cause her to learn that Chrissie lied to her and their school about changing majors; she only did so to dig up dirt on the NYPD, also illegally. Elsewhere, Jamie and Eddie learn a parole officer, Don Vorhees, is a dirty cop taking advantage of his power over parolees and having them do his dirty work for him, only to re-arrest them due to what he sees as "violations" of their parole. The parolees help Jamie and Eddie put an end to Vorhees's schemes.
169	14	"School of Hard Knocks"	Alex Zakrzewski	Ian Biederman	February 2, 2018	814	9.32
When a student is shot by a rival gang member in his high school courtyard, Danny and Baez try to get a grasp on the situation by meeting with the principal, Darryl Ward (Ernie Hudson), to prevent a reoccurrence. Unfortunately, a teacher at the school, Anna Chavez, gets beat up by one of the students, Theresa Jones, and declines to press charges, seeing something more in Theresa. The girl later admits to Danny that she loves Miss Chavez and that beating her up was part of her initiation, revealing that the gang goes after anyone who doesn't want to join. Ward blames himself for Miss Chavez's injuries, believing the safety of his staff is on him, and later recklessly takes matters into his own hands by holding several students hostage. Danny gets him to lower his gun, and Miss Chavez announces her intention to apply to take over for Ward once she recovers. Also, Erin tries to help her friend, Mickey Rodansky (Raphael Sbarge), who is mixed up in an illegal gambling ring, but Mickey is found murdered soon after agreeing to testify against his former bosses. Elsewhere, Governor Mendez (David Zayas) tries to frame Frank after one of his top legislative aides is accidentally shot via collateral damage by an NYPD officer who apprehends a perp. After the grand jury declines to indict the officer in the matter, Mendez threatens an investigation by the attorney general into NYPD-involved shootings if Frank doesn't fire the officer, but he later apologizes to Frank when they discover that the aide who was shot was having an affair with the wife of Mendez's chief of staff.
170	15	"Legacy"	David M. Barrett	Allie Solomon	March 2, 2018	815	9.06
Danny thinks about taking a new, higher-paying job to help with his family's financial issues. At the same time, he and Maria work a case of a recently divorced man who was poisoned. Nicky begins a new internship where her supervisor, Bobby, begins to make passes at her. He invites her out to dinner using the cover that it's an office get-together, but red flags are raised with Nicky when she finds that she is the only one to show. The following morning, Bobby tries to force her to have sex with him, but she is able to escape, and the other young women at the office join her against Bobby. Elsewhere, Frank has to deal with the fallout after a rookie cop, Rachel Witten, is caught on video questioning the immigration status of a jaywalking pedestrian; Witten is ultimately fired from the force.
171	16	"Tale of Two Cities"	Robert Duncan McNeill	Brian Burns	March 9, 2018	816	8.95
Danny and Baez investigate the murder of a man who was living a double life with two separate families. The case is initially a she-said she-said between the man's wife and girlfriend (who both pass a lie detector test), but his teenage son committed the murder when he found out about his father's double life. Meanwhile, Anthony tries to resist when Erin asks him to help investigate his old partner, whom she suspects of stealing drug money. Anthony even threatens to resign over the matter, but while questioning his old partner, Anthony deduces he is lying thanks to an old trick from when they used to play poker together. Also, Frank deliberates between two candidates for the chief of transit position. One is seemingly more qualified than the other (the latter lied about his military service but admitted it to Frank in a private meeting), but the former threw him under the bus, leading to Frank admonishing him at 1PP.
172	17	"Close Calls"	Jane Raab	Peter Blauner	March 30, 2018	817	8.43
After Danny's brother-in-law, Jimmy (Kevin Dillon), gets caught up with the mob and steals Danny's credit card, Danny forces Jimmy to take down the mobsters with Baez's help. Meanwhile, Frank has Erin and Anthony investigate if his old partner, Lenny (Treat Williams), is truly guilty of a crime after finding him at a strip club that had seen gunfire the night he was there. Lenny was set up by the manager of the club whose father had a beef with Lenny in the past. Also, Jamie is approached by Tariq (Rene Ifrah), an officer he met at the academy almost ten years ago, who wants his help getting released from his undercover assignment at a mosque after a several-year long operation, but Tariq successfully defuses a bus bomb just in the nick of time, leading to his promotion as a detective on the NYPD's joint terrorist task force.
173	18	"Friendship, Love, and Loyalty"	Robert Harmon	Siobhan Byrne O'Connor	April 6, 2018	818	8.75
After a woman voices her outrage regarding the NYPD's inability to find her son's murderer, Danny reexamines the case, upsetting the original detective, Erin, and Anthony, who didn't pursue the case due to lack of evidence. The shooter was in fact ID'd, but in the back of a police car, which initially forced Erin to cut him loose. Thanks to DNA pulled off the gun that was tossed into the sewers, the killer is brought to justice for good this time. Elsewhere, Eddie is shot while she and Jamie respond to a domestic dispute call, but her vest saves her; another officer is killed in the exchange of gunfire. The incident leaves Jamie pondering his feelings for Eddie, and Erin once again tries to convince him to act on them. However, he decides against it due to Eddie having a new boyfriend, although this leaves him saddened. Erin and her ex-husband, Jack, face off when the latter defends the shooter, who says it was part of a gang initiation to shoot a cop (he says he didn't mean for a cop to get killed); this leads to him getting charged with second-degree murder as opposed to first-degree, which is what his gang leader would be charged with. Frank contends with an angry police force when Mayor Dutton suggests at a press conference that the shooter may have felt threatened by the police. Mayor Dutton later reveals to Frank that she won't seek reelection, instead wanting to pursue activism.
174	19	"Risk Management"	David M. Barrett	Ian Biederman	April 13, 2018	819	8.25
Danny and Baez race to find a missing girl who will die within 72 hours without her heart medication. Interrogating the parents (who at first pointed toward the girl's boyfriend), Danny learns they were forced to turn to a loan shark for financial assistance after the girl's heart transplant surgery, and the loan shark ordered the kidnapping after the parents didn't pay him back quick enough. Also, Jamie and Eddie are on the wrong side of an investigation after engaging in a car chase. The carjacker had a child seat in the back of the car which is revealed to be unoccupied, and the boss suspends Jamie and Eddie for 30 days. Jamie represents himself and Eddie in the hearing, arguing that police officers are trained to make split-second decisions, which can sometimes end badly. Ultimately, Jamie and Eddie are cleared to return to duty. Frank, Garrett and Gormley investigate the rise in the settlement of lawsuits against cops, and Kelly Peterson (Bebe Neuwirth) returns to debate the topic with Frank. Meanwhile, Sean wins an essay contest and receives a medal from former New York City Mayor David Dinkins. Sean is reluctant to go to the ceremony, because he still misses his mother dearly, but relents after Danny tells him it's what Linda would've wanted him to do.
175	20	"Your Six"	Ralph Hemecker	Brian Burns	April 27, 2018	820	8.13
When Danny resorts to asking his incarcerated archenemy, Victor Lugo (Nick Cordero), for help locating a dangerous criminal who escaped from prison, Lugo refuses to assist unless he's allowed to accompany them on the pursuit. As Danny pursues the suspect into an old building, Lugo somehow deduces that it was a trap, and he is able to get Danny and the other cops out of the building before it explodes. Meanwhile, Frank subtly tries to convince Jamie to take the sergeant's test, but Jamie gives the application to Eddie instead. After being confronted by Frank, Jamie adamantly says he wants to stay on patrol. That evening, Jamie arrives late to Sunday dinner due to helping Eddie study. Also, Erin's plan to go on a date with her ex-husband causes friction between her and Anthony. Anthony had a fender bender that Jack was accidentally responsible for, due to making out with his new girlfriend, and Anthony confronts Jack in his office, stating that Erin deserves someone who will treat her like a queen.
176	21	"The Devil You Know"	John Behring	Peter Blauner	May 4, 2018	821	7.78
Frank goes head-to-head with a data-tracking company when they refuse to unlock the phone of a terrorist that may hold information regarding upcoming targets. He and Kelly Peterson meet with the CEO of the company, who personally refuses due to the public's views on phone privacy. Kelly reluctantly grants Frank's request to talk to the CEO again, and, in a private meeting, he finally gives Frank the information he needs. Elsewhere, when Erin obtains information about an impending murder from a known crime boss (John Pankow), she gets Danny and Baez involved, despite the questionable agenda of the informant. The criminal uses his son's release from jail as leverage, but it's revealed that the criminal orchestrated the hit himself. Also, Jamie and Eddie try to locate a woman, Alice, who kidnapped a newborn baby. Alice suffered a miscarriage, then posed as a nurse to kidnap the baby. Jamie has Eddie try to talk Alice down while he acts as the safety net below the bridge Alice is standing on, and Eddie is successful in saving the baby.
177	22	"My Aim Is True"	David M. Barrett	Kevin Wade	May 11, 2018	822	8.88
When a series of drive-by murders occur after six wrongly convicted men (called the "Prospect Park Six," loosely inspired by the Central Park Five) are released from prison, Danny and Baez wonder if they were orchestrated by one or more of the men as an act of revenge. Meanwhile, Frank combats the guilt he feels about these innocent men unfairly serving nine years in prison. One of the Prospect Park Six, Duwann Wilson, is revealed to have hired a hitman, Dante Sorrento, to kill various family members of the arresting officers and prosecutors responsible for locking them up nine years ago (one of which is Erin's boss, Monica Graham played by Tamara Tunie), as his mother had died while he was in prison and he wasn't allowed to attend her funeral. Elsewhere, Jamie and Eddie arrest the younger brother of one of the Prospect Park Six after he crashes a stolen car. Despite the mother wanting the cops to just leave the family alone, the older brother secretly meets with Jamie and Eddie to give them information about Wilson, who is hiding in Miami; Danny has Miami officers pose as massage therapists at the hotel Wilson is staying at, and they successfully arrest him. Sorrento, still at large, follows Jamie and Eddie as they begin a shift, targeting the former. When Eddie stops for coffee, she senses Jamie is in peril and kills Sorrento, saving Jamie's life. This affects their personal relationship; at Sunday dinner, Jamie reveals he looked at the patrol guide and didn't find any rules against married cops being partners on the force and brings Eddie, now his fiancée, to officially meet the family. Note: Nominated for an Edgar Award.

== Ratings ==
Viewership and ratings per episode of Blue Bloods season 8
No.	Title	Air date	Rating/share (18–49)	Viewers (millions)	DVR (18–49)	DVR viewers (millions)	Total (18–49)	Total viewers (millions)
1	"Cutting Losses"	September 29, 2017	1.1/5	10.04	0.7	4.57	1.8	14.60
2	"Ghosts of the Past"	October 6, 2017	1.0/4	9.49	0.7	4.18	1.7	13.67
3	"The Enemy of My Enemy"	October 13, 2017	0.9/4	8.98	0.6	4.13	1.5	13.11
4	"Out of the Blue"	October 20, 2017	0.9/4	9.08	0.7	4.12	1.6	13.20
5	"The Forgotten"	October 27, 2017	0.9/4	8.29	—N/a	4.14	—N/a	12.43
6	"Brushed Off"	November 3, 2017	0.9/4	9.27	—N/a	3.97	—N/a	13.24
7	"Common Ground"	November 10, 2017	1.0/5	9.94	0.7	3.84	1.7	13.78
8	"Pick Your Poison"	November 17, 2017	0.9/4	9.25	—N/a	4.14	—N/a	13.40
9	"Pain Killers"	December 1, 2017	0.8/4	8.84	0.7	4.54	1.5	13.41
10	"Heavy is the Head"	December 8, 2017	0.9/4	9.40	0.7	4.07	1.6	13.47
11	"Second Chances"	January 5, 2018	1.0/4	9.98	—N/a	3.59	—N/a	13.58
12	"The Brave"	January 12, 2018	1.0/4	10.17	0.7	4.39	1.7	14.56
13	"Erasing History"	January 19, 2018	0.9/4	9.45	0.7	4.42	1.6	13.87
14	"School of Hard Knocks"	February 2, 2018	0.9/4	9.32	0.7	4.36	1.6	13.69
15	"Legacy"	March 2, 2018	0.9/4	9.06	—N/a	4.42	—N/a	13.47
16	"Tale of Two Cities"	March 9, 2018	0.8/4	8.95	—N/a	4.24	—N/a	13.27
17	"Close Calls"	March 30, 2018	0.9/4	8.43	0.8	4.23	1.7	12.66
18	"Friendship, Love, and Loyalty"	April 6, 2018	0.8/4	8.75	0.6	4.17	1.4	12.92
19	"Risk Management"	April 13, 2018	0.8/4	8.25	—N/a	3.33	—N/a	11.58
20	"Your Six"	April 27, 2018	0.8/4	8.13	0.6	4.50	1.4	12.63
21	"The Devil You Know"	May 4, 2018	0.7/3	7.78	0.6	4.04	1.3	11.82
22	"My Aim Is True"	May 11, 2018	0.9/4	8.88	0.6	4.51	1.5	13.39
