= Terms of Endearment (play) =

Stage play written by Dan Gordon

- Original language: English
- Written by: Dan Gordon
- Genre: Drama
- Setting: River Oaks, Houston

Premiere
- Date: 2007 (UK Tour); 2016 (Off-Broadway)

Terms of Endearment is a dramatic stage play written by American playwright Dan Gordon, adapted from the novel by Larry McMurtry. The play tells the fictional story of mother and daughter Aurora Greenway and Emma Greenway-Horton as they face challenges in life and have their relationship tested, showing resilience and strength in the face of adversity.

The play first premiered in the United Kingdom in a 2007 touring production, starting at York Theatre Royal. The play has since been performed by professional and amateur theatre organizations worldwide. In 2016, an Off-Broadway production premiered starring Molly Ringwald as Aurora.

== Synopsis ==
Daughter Emma is often exasperated by her highly-opinionated mother, Aurora; they talk daily about their problems, from Aurora finding unexpected love even as she becomes a reluctant grandmother to Emma's struggle in her troubled marriage. But when they need one another most, will they be able to find courage in each other? This funny and touching story captures the delicate, sometimes fractured bonds between mothers and daughters, husbands and wives, and lovers, both old and new.

== Historical casting ==
Character	2007 UK Tour cast	2016 Off-Broadway cast
Aurora Greenway	Linda Gray	Molly Ringwald
Emma Greenway-Horton	Suranne Jones	Hannah Dunne
Garrett Breedlove	John Bowe	Jeb Brown
Flap Horton	Robert Fitch	Denver Milord
