= Let There Be Light (2017 film) =

2017 film by Kevin Sorbo

- Theatrical release poster
- Directed by: Kevin Sorbo
- Written by: Dan Gordon; Sam Sorbo
- Story by: Kevin Sorbo; Sam Sorbo
- Produced by: Sam Sorbo; Kevin Sorbo; Dan Gordon; James Quattrochi; Warren Ostergard
- Starring: Kevin Sorbo; Sam Sorbo; Sean Hannity
- Cinematography: Sean Butler
- Edited by: Peter Devaney Flanagan
- Music by: Marc Vanocur
- Production companies: LTBL Productions; Wildfire Films
- Distributed by: Atlas Distribution Company
- Release date: October 27, 2017
- Running time: 101 minutes
- Country: United States
- Language: English
- Box office: $7.2 million

Let There Be Light is a 2017 American Christian drama film directed by and starring Kevin Sorbo (in his feature film directorial debut) and written by Dan Gordon and Sam Sorbo. Its plot follows an atheist who goes through a near-death experience in an auto accident and converts to Christianity. Sean Hannity executive produced and appears in the film. Dionne Warwick and Travis Tritt also have roles in the film. It was released in the United States on October 27, 2017, and was panned by critics.

== Plot ==
Outspoken atheist Sol Harkens is having a debate with a Christian leader. After Harkens is considered to have won the debate, he attends a party for his book. He double-fists cocktails while trying to get his girlfriend to come home with him that night; she refuses. Disappointed, Harkens heads home in a drunken haze to sleep it off. On the way home, his publicist calls him to arrange more parties to increase his exposure. Since he was already drunk after leaving his party and continues to drink on the way home, he veers off the road and crashes into a construction site.

Suddenly surrounded by a carnival-like light tunnel, he sees hallucinations of his young son David, who died a few years earlier from cancer. His son enthusiastically claims that he is all right and that Sol should let God's love fill him, proclaiming "Let there be light!" as Harkens regains consciousness. After being clinically dead for 4 minutes, he awakens to find his Christian ex-wife Katy at his side, and tells her that he saw their son. His doctor diagnoses his visions as merely adrenal brain surges that are caused by traumatic moments.

Harkens continues to struggle with his crisis of science versus faith. After Katy shows up at his house to check on him, he decides to go and talk to pastor and former mob member Vinny at a church. After hearing the resurrection story, he has an epiphany and is baptized again as a believing Christian. After several visits from his ex-wife, he decides to rekindle their relationship so they can be a family again with their two surviving sons. He proposes and she accepts, but almost immediately they learn that she has cancer and is past the point of treatment.

Fox News' Sean Hannity hears of Harkens' story and asks him to come onto his program because he considers his story of great merit. Harkens announces a campaign of world peace called the "Let There Be Light" campaign. He believes that if everyone in the world shines their lights to the sky at night that it could be a bolster to world unity. During the night of the event the simultaneous action of the world shining their light to the heavens is visible from space. Meanwhile back home, the newly-remarried Harkens are having a night of family time singing Christmas songs outside when Katy suddenly dies in Sol's arms.

== Cast ==
- Kevin Sorbo as Sol Harkens
- Sam Sorbo as Katy Harkens
- Braeden Sorbo as Gus Harkens
- Shane Sorbo as Connor Harkens
- Daniel Roebuck as Norm
- Donielle Artese as Tracee
- Gary Grubbs as Dr. Fornier
- Travis Tritt as Dr. Corey
- Joe Herrera as Dr. Shell
- Leander Suleiman as Dr. Patel
- Walnette Marie Santiago as Cat Ryerson
- Olivia Fox as Vanessa
- Dionne Warwick as herself
- Mona Amein as Sally
- Sherri Eakin as Waitress
- Michael Franzese as Pastor Vinny
- Sean Hannity as himself

== Production ==
Let There Be Light was mostly shot in Birmingham, Alabama, with minor additional scenes filmed in New York City. It was loosely based on an original story created by Kevin and Sam Sorbo.

== Release ==
The film was released in the United States on October 27, 2017. Over its opening weekend the film made $1.8 million from 373 theaters, finishing 11th at the box office. In its second weekend the film was added to 269 theaters and made $1.7 million, finishing 10th at the box office.

== Critical response ==
The film was panned critics, who cited its hateful and hypocritical nature, bad acting, Sorbo's direction and poor production value. On the review aggregator website Rotten Tomatoes, 27% of 11 critics' reviews are positive.

Some reviewers question the accuracy of the film's claims and claim the characters in the film are strawmen. Dan Piepenbring, writing for the New Yorker, described the film as "a cynical, xenophobic morality tale, as bitter as it is saccharine." Dennis Harvey of Variety described it as "predictably simplistic and maudlin in content" yet "more polished than its ilk."
