= Kevin Sorbo =

American actor (born 1958)

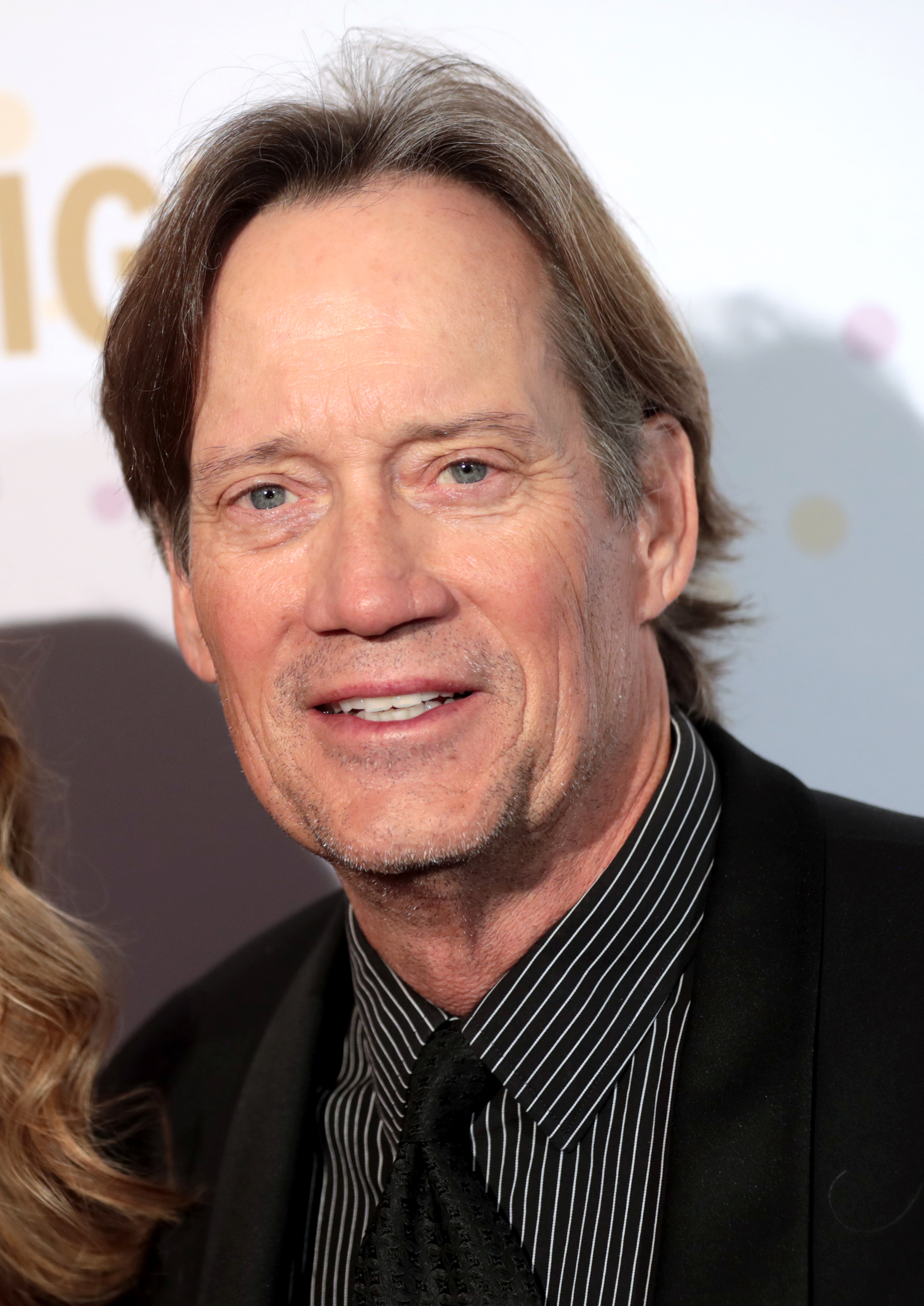
- Sorbo in 2022
- Born: Kevin David Sorbo; September 24, 1958 (age 68); Mound, Minnesota, U.S.
- Education: Minnesota State University Moorhead (BA)
- Occupations: Actor; producer; director
- Years active: 1984–present
- Spouse: Sam Jenkins (m. 1998)
- Children: 3, including Braeden

Kevin David Sorbo (born September 24, 1958) is an American actor, director and producer. He has had starring roles in two television series: as Hercules in Hercules: The Legendary Journeys (1995–1999) and as Captain Dylan Hunt in Andromeda (2000–2005). Sorbo played his first leading film role in the 1997 fantasy film Kull the Conqueror. Sorbo is also known for acting in Christian films, such as God's Not Dead (2014) and Let There Be Light (2017).

== Early life and education ==
Sorbo was born in Mound, Minnesota, on September 24, 1958. He is of Italian and Norwegian descent. He was raised in a Lutheran family. Sorbo attended Minnesota State University Moorhead, where he double majored in marketing and advertising. To help pay for tuition, he began to work as a model for print and television advertising.

== Career ==
=== Early work ===
In the early 1980s, Sorbo travelled around Europe and Australia working in television commercials and modelling for print advertisements. During this period, he made his acting debut in an episode of the soap opera Santa Barbara in 1986. His second television appearance was in an episode of the sitcom 1st & Ten in 1988. He continued working in advertising and by the early 1990s, he had appeared in over 150 commercials. One of the popular commercials he appeared in was for Jim Beam bourbon whiskey, known for Sorbo's repeated catchphrase, "This ain't Jim Beam".

His acting career continued in the early 1990s with guest appearances in Murder, She Wrote and The Commish. In 1992, he played his first leading role in an unsuccessful television pilot for a medical drama series titled Condition: Critical, which was not picked up, but aired as a television film on ABC. In 1993, he was considered for and lost out to Dean Cain as Superman in the TV series Lois & Clark: The New Adventures of Superman and was one of the possible contenders for the role of Fox Mulder in The X-Files, which went to David Duchovny. In 1993, he made his film debut in Slaughter of the Innocents.

=== Professional breakthrough ===
In 1993, Sorbo received his breakthrough leading role as the ancient Greek demigod Hercules in a series of five television films that aired as part of Universal Television's Action Pack. The first film to premiere was Hercules and the Amazon Women, which aired in April 1994, the others following later in the year. The ratings success of the films paved the way for the commission of the television series Hercules: The Legendary Journeys, which started airing in syndication from January 1995 and ran for six seasons. The series made Sorbo an international star and was one of the highest rated syndicated television shows at the time. The show was filmed in New Zealand.

The success of the show spawned the popular spin-off series Xena: Warrior Princess starring Lucy Lawless, who was introduced in a three-episode arc in the first season of Hercules. This allowed Sorbo as well as several other characters from both shows to make crossover appearances. In 1998, a spin-off direct-to-video, animated film titled Hercules and Xena – The Animated Movie: The Battle for Mount Olympus was released with both Sorbo and Lawless voicing the characters.

Hercules was canceled midway through the filming of its sixth season, of which only eight episodes were produced. The final episode aired in November 1999. Although it was not revealed at the time, health issues reduced Sorbo's abilities to perform the physically demanding role during the later seasons. Sorbo made his final appearance as Hercules on Xena, in the Season Five episode "God Fearing Child", which aired in February 2000.

In between his years playing Hercules, Sorbo played his first leading film role in the 1997-released film Kull the Conqueror. He was selected for the role in December 1995, and the picture was shot in Slovakia and Croatia between August and October 1996. In a mostly negative review, The New York Times writes, "Mr. Sorbo provides the requisite oiled torso, a hint of humor and the professionalism and good grace to act as if Kull the Conqueror mattered."

In July 1997, it was announced that Sorbo would star in Black Dog for around $3 million, with Kevin Hooks slated to direct and produce and the intention to shoot in September during Sorbo's hiatus from Hercules: The Legendary Journeys. During an interview, Sorbo described the film as "Die Hard meets Speed." In September 1997, Meat Loaf and Randy Travis were signed to star opposite Sorbo. However, by November of that year, it was reported that Patrick Swayze had replaced Sorbo in Black Dog.

=== Post-Hercules work ===
After Hercules ended, Sorbo played the starring role of Captain Dylan Hunt in the science-fiction drama series Andromeda from 2000 to 2005. In 2006, he played a recurring role on the final season of The O.C.

In 2007, he starred in two direct-to-video sequels to Walking Tall, Walking Tall: The Payback and Walking Tall: Lone Justice. In the Hallmark Channel film Avenging Angel, he co-starred with his wife, Sam Jenkins.

In 2008, he appeared in the spoof film titled Meet the Spartans.

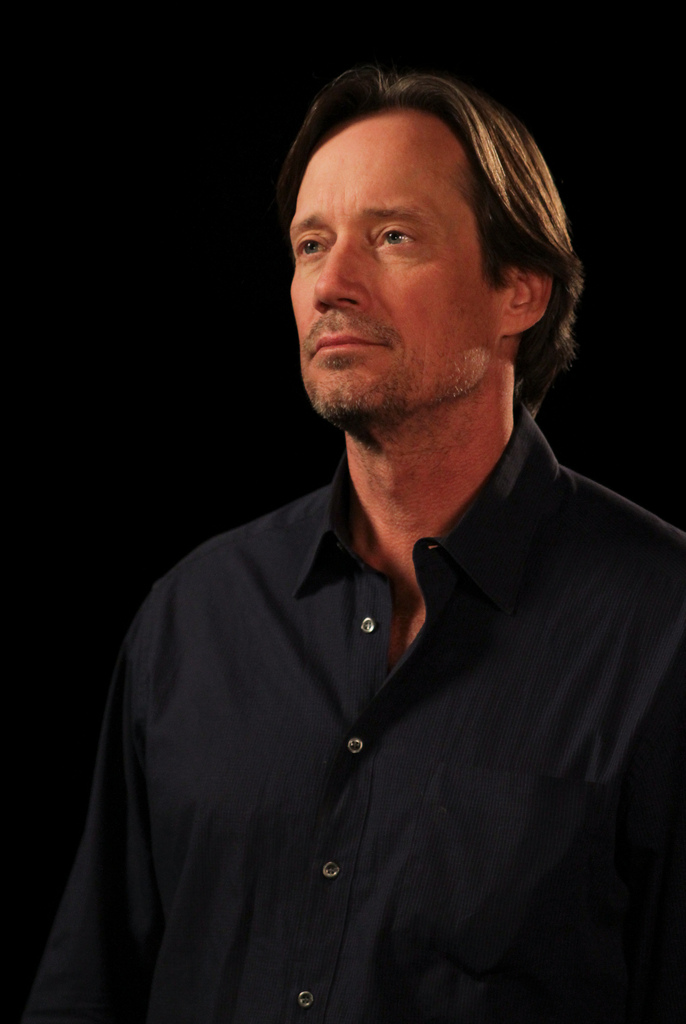
Sorbo in 2013

In the first of what would be several voice acting jobs, Sorbo performed one of the main protagonists, Prometheus, in the video game The Conduit. He reprised the role of Hercules in the video game God of War III and worked together with his wife on the game Cloudberry Kingdom.

In 2014, Sorbo co-starred in God's Not Dead, a Christian film in which he portrayed an atheist college professor who requires his students to disown their religions on the first day of his class. Although heavily panned by critics, it was a commercial success and the first of a series of Christian films that Sorbo would produce or perform.

Sorbo appeared in the 2015 romantic comedy Single in South Beach, starring Haley Webb. On Twitter, in 2019, she accused Sorbo of sexual advances and of sexually harassing her on the set. However, Webb did not elaborate on any of her accusations, and he did not respond to her tweet.

In 2017, Sorbo directed and starred in the Christian drama film Let There Be Light, which featured conservative pundit Sean Hannity, who was also an executive producer. It was described by The New Yorker as "a cynical, xenophobic morality tale, as bitter as it is saccharine" that closes with "a dénouement of bald Islamophobia". The Los Angeles Times, although critical, says that it provides "an involving bonanza" for its intended Christian audience. Sorbo is described as bringing "puckish charm and credible warmth to his role".

That same year, Sorbo guest-starred in three episodes of the superhero television series Supergirl. Sorbo portrayed Lar Gand with Teri Hatcher as his wife Rhea. Coincidentally, Sorbo was almost cast as Superman opposite Hatcher's Lois Lane 24 years earlier in Lois and Clark: The New Adventures of Superman.

In 2024, he appeared in the Ronald Reagan biopic Reagan opposite Dennis Quaid, who plays the title role.

== Personal life ==
Sorbo is a Christian. He grew up Lutheran. He attends a nondenominational church. On January 5, 1998, Sorbo married actress Sam Jenkins, whom he met the previous year when she had a small recurring role on Hercules (Season 3, Episode 8 "Prince Hercules"). They have three children, including Braeden Sorbo.

In 2001, Sorbo was featured on a celebrity edition of the game show Who Wants to Be a Millionaire, winning $32,000. The money was donated to his charity, A World Fit For Kids.

=== Health ===
In late 1997, while on a publicity tour for Kull the Conqueror and between the fourth and fifth seasons of Hercules, Sorbo experienced an aneurysm in his shoulder which caused three strokes. As a result, he was weakened for the next several years, a condition kept secret from the public while he recovered. During the last two seasons of Hercules (the fifth and sixth, which aired in 1998 and 1999), Sorbo had a reduced filming schedule to accommodate his condition, and more guest stars were featured in the show in order to reduce Sorbo's duties. In his 2011 autobiography True Strength, Sorbo revealed the details of his injury and how his wife Sam helped him recover.

In 2013, Sorbo received the Public Leadership in Neurology Award from the American Academy of Neurology and the American Brain Foundation for his efforts raising awareness about stroke. He also received the 2013 Inspiration Honors Award from the Invisible Disabilities Association.

=== Politics ===
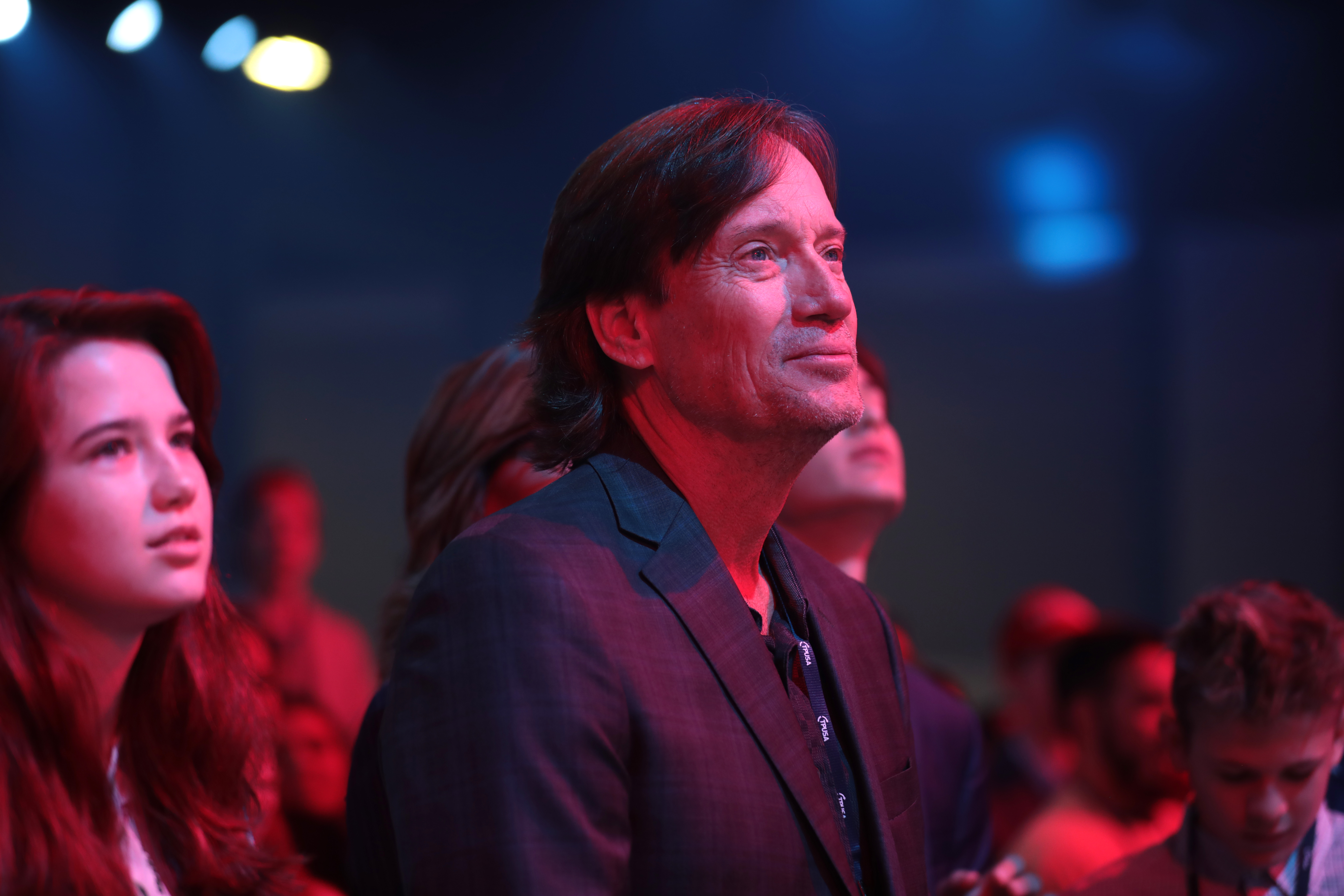
Sorbo in 2020 at an event hosted by Turning Point USA

In 2014, during an interview with Jerry Newcombe on the radio show Vocal Point, Sorbo defended Mel Gibson against allegations that his 2004 film The Passion of the Christ was anti-Semitic with the words: "News bulletin: you did kill Jesus!" Sorbo later stated he could have rephrased his statements, but defended his stance.

In February 2021, Sorbo's Facebook page was removed due to "repeatedly sharing debunked claims about the coronavirus or vaccines". In June 2023, Sorbo shared an article repeating the unsubstantiated claim that actor Jamie Foxx had been injured by a COVID-19 vaccine.

After Donald Trump lost the 2020 presidential election, Sorbo repeatedly made remarks defending Trump's false claims of election fraud. Although he initially supported the January 6 United States Capitol attack participants and encouraged them to respect the police, Sorbo subsequently backtracked and blamed the violence on antifa. This led to a Twitter exchange between him and his former co-star Lucy Lawless, who have exchanged conflicting views on personal and political matters throughout the past 20 years.

In 2022, Sorbo was a featured speaker at the Conservative Political Action Conference. He wore a suit lined with his own tweets. In 2023, Sorbo published a children's book entitled The Test of Lionhood, which explores the theme of masculinity from a Christian perspective for young boys, as part of a larger fight in defense of the virtues of masculinity, which he says are being eroded in Hollywood and in society at large.

Kevin supports convicted rapist Russell Brand who says his only mistake was becoming a Christian

== Filmography ==
=== Film ===
Year	Title	Role	Notes
1993	Slaughter of the Innocents	John Willison	
1997	Kull the Conqueror	Kull	
2004	Clipping Adam	Father Dan	
2007	Walking Tall: The Payback	Nick Prescott	Direct-to-video
2007	Walking Tall: Lone Justice	Nick Prescott	Direct-to-video
2008	Meet the Spartans	Captain	
2008	Prairie Fever	Preston Biggs	Direct-to-video
2008	An American Carol	George Mulrooney	
2009	Fire from Below	Jake Denning	
2009	Bitch Slap	Mr. Phoenix	
2010	What If...	Ben Walker	
2010	Wog Boy 2: Kings of Mykonos	Pierluigi	
2010	Tales of an Ancient Empire	Aedan	
2010	Pool Boy: Drowning Out the Fury	Sal Bando	
2010	Paradox	Sean Nault	
2011	Soul Surfer	Holt Blanchard	
2011	Julia X	The Stranger	
2011	Coffin		
2012	Abel's Field	Abel	Executive producer
2012	Black Box	James	
2012	Sorority Party Massacre	Captain Dan Fanning	
2012	FDR: American Badass!	Abraham Lincoln	
2013	Paranormal Movie	Security Guy	
2013	Storm Rider	Sam Fielding	
2013	Alone for Christmas	Quentin	Direct-to-video
2014	One Shot	Commander Gibson	
2014	Alongside Night	Dr. Martin Vreeland	Executive producer
2014	Survivor	Captain Hunter	
2014	The Black Rider: Revelation Road	Honcho	
2014	Coffee Shop	Produzent	
2014	God's Not Dead	Professor Jeffrey Radisson	
2014	Mythica: A Quest for Heroes	Gojun Pye	
2015	Confessions of a Prodigal Son	Father	
2015	The Sparrows: Nesting	Pastor Dave	
2015	Single in South Beach	Sam	
2015	Hope Bridge	Pastor	
2015	Mythica: The Darkspore	Gojun Pye	
2015	One More Round	Billy Jack Taylor	
2015	Gallows Road	Frank	
2015	Mythica: The Necromancer	Gojun Pye	
2016	Caged No More	Richard / Jack	
2016	Forgiven	Lieutenant Morgan	
2016	Mythica: The Iron Crown	Gojun Pye	
2016	Rodeo Girl	Duke Williams	
2016	Mythica: The Godslayer	Gojun Pye	
2016	Joseph & Mary	Joseph	
2016	Spirit of the Game	Parley Condie	
2017	Let There Be Light	Dr. Sol Harkins	Director
2018	Bernie the Dolphin	Winston Mills	
2019	The Reliant		
2019	Miracle in East Texas	Doc Boyd	Director, wide release in 2023
2019	Bernie the Dolphin 2	Winston Mills	
2020	The Penitent Thief	King Herod	
2020	Against the Tide	Himself	
2021	The Girl Who Believes in Miracles	Dr. Ben Riley	
2021	Trail Blazers	Ethan	Post-production
2023	Left Behind: Rise of the Antichrist	Rayford Steele	Director
2023	Alien Storm	President of the U.S.	
2024	The Firing Squad	Pastor Lynbrook	
2024	Reagan	Reverend Cleaver	
2024	Until the Last Promise	Pastor Thomas	
2024	And God Made Man	Rev. Ernestine Coughlin	
2024	Jesus Freaks	Adult Josh	
2024	A Christmas Heart	Detective Kevin Powers	
2024	I Feel Fine	Dr. Sanders	
2024	God's Here	Detective Kevin Powers	
2024	Devil's Knight	Guard Captain Baldur	
2024	The Last Redemption	Lord Roland	Producer
2025	The American Miracle	Younger Thomas Jefferson	
2026	Crossroads	Dan Johnson	

=== Television ===
Year	Title	Role	Notes
1986	Santa Barbara	Lars	1 episode
1988	1st & Ten	Barry	Episode: "...The Clock Runs Out"
1992	Cheers	Uncredited	Episode: "License to Hill"
1992	Condition: Critical	Dr. Thaddeus Kocinski	Television film
1993	Murder, She Wrote	Michael Burke	Episode: "A Virtual Murder"
1993	The Commish	Mark	Episode: "Dying Affection"
1994	Hercules and the Amazon Women	Hercules	Television film
1994	Hercules and the Lost Kingdom	Hercules	Television film
1994	Hercules and the Circle of Fire	Hercules	Television film
1994	Hercules in the Underworld	Hercules	Television film
1994	Hercules in the Maze of the Minotaur	Hercules	Television film
1995–1999	Hercules: The Legendary Journeys	Hercules	111 episodes, also Director for episodes #2.17 & #3.20
1995	Cybill	Rick	Episode: "The Last Temptation of Cybill"
1995–2000	Xena: Warrior Princess	Hercules	2 episodes
1998	Hercules and Xena – The Animated Movie: The Battle for Mount Olympus	Hercules	Voice
1999	Just Shoot Me!	Scott	Episode: "An Axe to Grind"
2000–2005	Andromeda	Captain Dylan Hunt	110 episodes, executive producer
2001	Dharma & Greg	Charlie	4 episodes
2003	According to Jim	Darryl Buckner	Episode: "The Pass"
2004	Hope & Faith	Kenny	Episode: "Mismatch"
2005	Love, Inc.	Father John	Episode: "Amen"
2006	Two and a Half Men	Andy	Episode: "Always a Bridesmaid, Never a Burro"
2006	Last Chance Café	Chance Coulter	Television film
2006–2007	The O.C.	Frank Atwood	7 episodes
2007	Avenging Angel	Preacher	Television film
2007	Psych	Byrd Tatums	Episode: "Bounty Hunters!"
2007	Something Beneath	Father Douglas Middleton	Television film
2008	Never Cry Werewolf	Redd Tucker	Television film
2008	The Middleman	1969 Middleman / Guy Goddard	Episode: "The Obsolescent Cryogenic Meltdown"
2009	Gary Unmarried	Larry	"Seven"
2009	Lightning Strikes	Ted Bradly	Television film
2009–2010	The Super Hero Squad Show	Ka-Zar	Voice, 2 episodes
2009	Wolf Canyon	Rick / Sheriff Wolf	Television film, also executive producer
2010	Hawaii Five-0	Carlton Bass	Episode: "Ko'olauloa"
2010	The Santa Suit	Drake Hunter / Santa Claus	Television film
2011	Flesh Wounds	Lt. Tyler	Television film
2011	The Guild	Himself	Episode: "Social Traumas"
2012	Don't Trust the B— in Apartment 23	Himself	Episode: "The Wedding"
2012	Key & Peele	Brad	Episode #2.6
2012	Christmas Angel	Dr. Nathan Davis	Television film
2012	The Eric André Show	Himself	Episode: "The Eric André New Year's Eve Spooktacular"
2013	Shadow on the Mesa	Ray Eastman	Television film
2017	Supergirl	Lar Gand	3 episodes

=== Video games ===
Year	Title	Role	Notes
1997	Mortal Kombat 4	Reiko, Quan Chi	Voice
2009	The Conduit	Prometheus	Voice
2010	God of War III	Hercules	Voice
2012	Skylanders: Giants	Crusher	Voice
2013	Skylanders: Swap Force	Crusher	Voice
2013	Cloudberry Kingdom	Bob	Voice
2014	Skylanders: Trap Team	Crusher	Voice
2015	Smite	Retro Skin Hercules	Voice
2015	Skylanders: SuperChargers	Crusher	Voice
2016	Skylanders: Imaginators	Crusher	Voice
