= List of Left Behind characters =

This is a list of characters in the long-running Left Behind novel series created by Tim LaHaye and Jerry B. Jenkins.

== Suhail Akbar ==
Suhail Akbar
- Left Behind character
- First appearance: Left Behind
- Last appearance: Kingdom Come
- Created by: Tim LaHaye and Jerry B. Jenkins

In-universe information
- Gender: Male
- Title(s): Director of Security and Intelligence
- Religion: Muslim
- Nationality: Pakistani

Suhail Akbar is a supporting antagonist in the Left Behind series. A native of Pakistan, he is a prominent member of the Global Community. He is hired by Nicolae Carpathia during the last half of the Tribulation period to be his Security and Intelligence chief in control of Peacekeepers and Morale Monitors throughout all the world regions. Jim Hickman was his predecessor. In contrast to the ineptitude of Hickman, upon hearing the appointment of Akbar, David Hassid fears he would be competent enough to stymie the Tribulation Force. Akbar is characterized as a man who is reticent and slow to voice an opinion, but someone who is loyal and effective behind the scenes.

In Desecration, he receives the mark of the beast along with his fellow members of the Global Community cabinet – Walter Moon and Viv Ivins – at the Temple Mount a day before Carpathia commits the abomination of desolation. For his mark, he gets a giant black 42 dominating his forehead. Later he is ordered to bomb the gathering of Christians and Jews at Petra, planning for a BLU-82 and a "lance" missile to be dropped on them, but the inhabitants there are unharmed. He has the esteem of the Supreme Potentate that he is entrusted with organizing "the most massive offensive in the history of mankind" to drive the Christians and Jews from Jerusalem and Petra. Carpathia tells Director Akbar that the practically limitless monetary and military resources afforded to him for the endeavor would make every other historical military strategist hang his head in shame. In Glorious Appearing, even though he is entrusted to command the overwhelming forces to overrun Petra and Jerusalem of the Global Community One World Unity Army, Akbar is publicly shamed for daring to mention the destruction of New Babylon in front of Carpathia in his underground bunker in Solomon's Stables. He is later beaten to death on Carpathia's orders by another Unity Army Officer with a rattan rod.

Akbar is loyal to Carpathia, always zealous to carry about his directives, even though the directives come in a pique or at a whim. In Desecration, he sees Carpathia personally murder high-ranking loyal personnel – such as Loren Hut and Walter Moon – for failing to fulfill Carpathia's orders, even though they act competently and give an earnest effort. For those murders, Akbar loans Carpathia his sidearm when Carpathia vehemently requests it. On his own initiative, he also orders the execution of two fighter pilots who fail to incinerate the stronghold of Petra due to divine protection of the inhabitants, even though the pilots hit their targets and the bombs detonate. Akbar ironically dies under similar circumstances for a minor infraction just hours before the Glorious Appearing of Jesus Christ.

Akbar is willing to stand up for competent personnel under him. When one of the pilots attacking Petra seemingly sounds insubordinate while communicating to mission command at the Global Community palace, Akbar defends him when Carpathia is offended by the pilot's tone and Leon Fortunato demands the pilot be reprimanded. However, Akbar has no qualms in killing his pilots when Carpathia expresses his disappointment in their performance and when they pridefully refuse to conform to the Global Community party line.

Akbar is not only loyal to Carpathia, but actually regards him as a divine figure; his attitude is similar to a divine command theorist or a theological voluntarist who regards God's will as constituting the basis for morality or truth. He may comply with Carpathia's directives out of personal and professional expediency instead of sincere reverence; loyalty to Carpathia is what has advanced his career to the point where he becomes Global Community Director of Security and Intelligence. When questioned by Carpathia about whether the execution of two innocent people bothers his conscience, Akbar says that Carpathia is the "father of truth", reiterating Carpathia's remarks after he finishes the lie detector test, where Carpathia reports some obvious falsehoods that are assessed to be truthful replies. When one of the stewards on Carpathia's plane refers to Leon Fortunato as "Mr. Fortunato", Akbar corrects him, saying that it is "Reverend Fortunato"; he does not mind but states the steward should not make that mistake in front of "His Excellency". When the steward replies, "or the Most High Reverend Father", Akbar chuckles. Akbar probably does not hold Fortunato or the role of Most High Reverend Father of Carpathianism in high esteem.

In the dramatic audio for the Kids series, during Carpathia's entrance in Jerusalem, Lionel Washington says that while he was in the Morale Monitor program, there was a picture of Akbar present on the wall during meals.

=== Criticism ===
Suhail Akbar's portrayal in the novels was criticized for being anti Muslim.

== Abdullah Smith Ababneh ("Smitty") ==
Abdullah Ababneh is a former Jordanian fighter pilot, first officer for the Phoenix 216, Royal Jordanian Air Force, Amman. His divorced wife and two children disappear in the Rapture. He is a principal Trib Force pilot assigned to Petra and witnesses the Glorious Appearing. He now resides near the Valley of Jehoshaphat, Israel.

== Al B. ("Albie") ==
Albie (no real name given, named for the town Al Basrah) is a Middle East black-market arms dealer who becomes a believer and a member of the Tribulation Force. He helps Rayford rescue Hattie Durham from a detention center in Colorado in The Mark, using the name Marcus Elbaz. He is killed trying to purchase help from another black market dealer named Mainyu Mazda. He later returns with the resurrected martyrs at the second coming of Jesus.

== Bruce Barnes ==
Before the Rapture, Bruce is the associate pastor at New Hope Village Church, serving with the then-senior pastor Vernon Billings. He has doubted the Bible for most of his life; though he has professed faith in Jesus Christ, he has never truly believed in his heart. When the Rapture takes place and his wife and three children are taken to Heaven, Bruce almost falls into depression and total disbelief. Despite his losses, however, he is determined to start anew. He goes to New Hope Village Church that night and meets a few other members who have also been left behind. He finds a video of the pastor explaining the Rapture, from which he learns that it is not too late to be saved, and commits his life to God.

Bruce befriends Rayford Steele, whom he supplies with a copy of the video. The two of them are soon joined by Rayford's daughter, Chloe, and Cameron "Buck" Williams, and together they form an inner core group, the Tribulation Force. Their mission is to help the lost find Christ and prepare for God's judgment that is to follow the peace agreement between the Antichrist and Israel. Bruce acts as a spiritual mentor and adviser to the Tribulation Force, explaining the foretold prophecies of what is to come in the final days. Their study reveals that the peace covenant with Israel will mark the beginning of the seven years' war with the Antichrist, known as the Tribulation.

Shortly after returning to the U.S. from a missions trip to India, Bruce is killed when the hospital he is being treated at for an overseas bug gets bombed by the Global Community in order to decimate a nearby rebel compound. He is the first of many casualties the Tribulation Force suffers during the seven-year Tribulation. Even though Bruce is killed relatively early in the Tribulation, the Force he helps establish becomes a driving presence during the global war. It is hinted later in the series that Bruce is poisoned by Nicolae Carpathia's agents and may have died prior to the actual hospital bombing. In the third film based on the books, Left Behind: World at War, Bruce dies from being infected with a virus, and most of the Tribulation Force (all except for Buck) is at his bedside when he dies.

Bruce is resurrected at the Glorious Appearing. In the Millennium World, he and his wife go on Rayford's missionary trip to Egypt to help spread the gospel. He is present at the final battle of the Millennium, watching from a safe distance in Jerusalem with the rest of the Tribulation Force.

In Left Behind: The Kids, Bruce mentors four teenagers, Judd, Lionel, Ryan, and Vicki, who are left behind at the Rapture.

In the original Left Behind films, Bruce is portrayed by Clarence Gilyard, and Arnold Pinnock. In the remake series, he is played by Lance E. Nichols in the remake, Charles Andrew Payne in Left Behind: Rise of the Antichrist and William Gabriel Grier in the spin-off Vanished – Left Behind: Next Generation

== Dr. Tsion Ben-Judah ==
Tsion Ben-Judah, pronounced "Zion", is a Jewish rabbinical scholar and former student of Chaim Rosenzweig. Ben-Judah is commissioned by the Israeli government three years before the Rapture to undertake a study as to how the Jews would recognize the Messiah when he comes. Ben-Judah begins to conclude that Jesus of Nazareth meets the descriptions of prophecy, but has not committed himself when Christ raptures his church.

Two weeks later, when United Nations secretary-general and Antichrist Nicolae Carpathia and a host of American and Israeli delegates arrive in Israel to sign a seven-year treaty of peace, and at the behest of Buck Williams, Ben-Judah guides Buck to the Western Wall so that he can speak with the two prophets, Eli and Moishe, men resurrected from biblical times to bear witness to Christ and begin converting 144,000 Jews to become witnesses for Christ.

The meeting with the two witnesses has a profound effect on Ben-Judah, who speaks Nicodemus's words to Jesus, while the two witnesses take turns speaking Jesus' words. Ben-Judah leaves the meeting with much to think and pray about. The next day, Carpathia and the Israelis sign the peace treaty, and shortly after, Ben-Judah makes a one-hour broadcast on GNN International to present his findings. At the end, he proclaims that Jesus is the Messiah and will be coming again soon.

Many Israelis and Jews worldwide are outraged at Ben-Judah, but he begins to teach and meet with Jews all around the world as more and more began to convert to Christ. Eighteen months later, his wife and teenage stepchildren are horribly slaughtered; Ben-Judah, the chief suspect, is forced into hiding. Buck is guided to him with hints from the two witnesses at the Wailing Wall, and secretly conducts Ben-Judah out of Israel by way of Egypt, to be flown back to the United States for exile and sanctuary.

Just before this, the Chicago-based Tribulation Force's own leader and teacher, Bruce Barnes, is killed by the Red Horse of the Apocalypse when World War III breaks out. Bombs hit the hospital where Barnes is hospitalized for a disease that stops his worldwide encouragement of Tribulation Saints. Ben-Judah takes his place to teach, now reaching out to a worldwide cyber-audience. Ben-Judah, believing himself to be protected by God's power, insists on returning to Israel to meet with most of the 144,000 witnesses in order to teach them. Only hours before the Antichrist's resurrection, Ben-Judah has an out-of-body experience where he witnesses the hosts of Heaven, and the archangel Michael battling Lucifer, in dragon form. The Dragon is cast down to Earth near the end of this experience.

He moves to Petra where Nicolae Carpathia drops two bombs and a missile just minutes after his arrival. There he resides until the Battle of Armageddon, when he leaves to help defend the Holy City. There, both he and Buck Williams are killed by Unity Army soldiers. He is resurrected at the Glorious Appearing, after having reunited with his wife and children in Heaven. In Kingdom Come, he and former fellow Trib Force members lead a missionary trip to Egypt, which Ben-Judah renames Osaze, meaning "loved by God" after turning its inhabitants from Ptah worship. At the end of the Millennium, Ben-Judah is welcomed into Heaven with the rest of the believers.

== Vicki Byrne ==
Vicki Byrne grows up in a trailer park, which she hates because people regularly make fun of her and the others who live there. Her parents smoke, drink, and fight constantly. Every Friday, Byrne has to babysit her sister Jeannie; however, she occasionally runs off to smoke, drink or do dope with her friends. When Vicki is twelve, a man asks to speak at the dance. At first the crowd is irritated, and then grows quiet as he tells all present that Jesus loves them enough to have died for them and that Jesus wants everyone to accept his gift of grace and eternal life. Byrne's parents and her sister, along with her brother Eddie in Michigan, all accept Jesus as their Lord and Savior, while a defiant Vicki refuses. Following her parents' conversion, she becomes even more rebellious and refuses to convert. One night, after returning from a party to a quiet house, she goes to bed and wakes up the next morning to her family missing. Though her best friend Shelly wonders what happened, Byrne knows the truth — Christ has come back for his own. She then accepts Christ upon meeting Bruce Barnes, Judd Thompson, Lionel Washington, and Ryan Daley. She spends the next seven years proselytizing, including interrupting a concert by Z-Van (lead singer of the Four Horsemen and one of Nicolae Carpathia's false messiahs) and speaking to the crowd of thousands. Judd falls in love with her very early in the series; the two are married around a year before the Glorious Appearing, shortly following her twentieth birthday.

== Nicolae Carpathia ==
Nicolae Jetty Carpathia
- Constituency: Global Community

Personal details
- Born: February 16 Cluj County, Romania
- Died: February 16 Har Megiddo, Israel
- Profession: Politician

Nicolae Jetty Carpathia is the primary antagonist in the Left Behind book series. Within the series, Carpathia is the Antichrist, and leader of the Global Community (GC), a world government which he ultimately marshals against the followers of Jesus Christ.

In the Left Behind films, Carpathia is portrayed by Gordon Currie, Randy LaHaye and Bailey Chase. In the Left Behind PC games, he is portrayed by Trevor Parsons.

=== Life ===
==== Early life and rise to power ====
According to the plot, Carpathia was born in Cluj County, Romania, the product of genetic engineering and artificial insemination. His mother, Marilena, is unwittingly convinced by a group of Luciferians, whose group she joins, to become the mother of a child who, they assure her, will change the face of the world. Marilena stays with her husband, Sorin, until the baby is born, insisting that her son keep the strong Carpathia name. (In the prequel novel The Rising, it is explained that the name Nicolae, when translated, means 'victory of the people', although this is far from Carpathia's actual goals. His middle name refers to the "jet-black" night on which he was born.)

Through his parents, Carpathia possesses a unique bloodline dating back to Ancient Rome, so he can actually claim to be a Roman descendant. This references both the early Christian belief that the Antichrist would come in the form of a Roman emperor, as well as the current premillennialist Christian view that the Antichrist will emerge from a "New Roman Empire".

As a young child, Carpathia shows remarkable intelligence and athletic ability, and also proves to be extraordinarily manipulative, able to bend others to his will with relative ease. His handlers arrange for his mother to be eliminated, and Nicolae himself eventually demands the dispatch of his "father", a key to his rise to power. With his advisers and counselors, Carpathia forms a successful import-export business which quickly makes him a millionaire. After he becomes a millionaire, he is then taken by a demon to a desert, probably the Judaean Desert, where he is forced to live without food and water for 40 days. In contrast to the temptation of Christ, Nicolae falls for all three temptations, thus fully confirming that he will soon be the Antichrist. After that, he is then returned to Romania. He quickly grows bored with business and finance and, guided by the "kingmaker" Leon Fortunato, sets his sights on politics.

At the age of 24, Carpathia steps into the political scene as a member of the lower house of the Parliament of Romania. Falling victim to Fortunato's blackmail, the President of Romania resigns, allowing Carpathia to assume power with the unanimous support of the country's parliament. He also finances an attempted invasion of Israel which is thwarted by God.

Shortly thereafter, in the chaos following the Rapture, Carpathia is appointed United Nations Secretary-General. From this office, he converts the U.N. into the Global Community, appointing himself as that government's Supreme Potentate.

After Carpathia establishes the Global Community, the governments of the United States, United Kingdom, and Egypt launch an uprising against him, resulting in WWIII. Carpathia allows his enemies to start the war so that the Community can "retaliate" by destroying them.

Carpathia orders cities around the world, including neutral ones, to be obliterated to serve as an example to his enemies. London, Chicago, and other cities are nuked, resulting in millions of casualties, and blamed on the rebels.

Having won the war, and with no government left to oppose him, Carpathia gains full dominion of the earth.

==== Death and resurrection ====
After three and a half years in power, Carpathia is assassinated by Chaim Rosenzweig, an Israeli botanist and statesman. He is killed by a lethal head wound from a sword which Rosenzweig had concealed. His demise is short-lived, however, as after three days of lying dead, Carpathia's body is indwelt by Satan himself, thus making Carpathia appear to rise from the dead and further cement his power. Four million people attend his funeral.

==== Final 3½ years ====
After his resurrection, Carpathia drops his peaceful facade and reveals himself to be a narcissistic and psychopathic tyrant. He has statues of himself built around the world, which all people are required to bow to. He then enforces the loyalty mark, the prophesied Mark of the Beast, which all are required to wear. Refusal to do either of these activities is made punishable by public execution. Carpathia has the Global Community motto written as "Hail Carpathia, our lord and risen king!". He then wages a genocidal purge against Christians, Jews, Muslims, and secular rebels, going as far as telling an officer in Desecration to behead enemy bodies, even if already dead.

To complete his quest for world domination, Carpathia creates the One World Unity Army, composed of all GC military presence on the planet. Their mission is to destroy the remnant stronghold of Petra and take over the city of Jerusalem as the world's new capital, following the supernatural destruction of New Babylon. He also gathers the armies of the world at the valley of Armageddon for the battle with Jesus Christ and his army.

In accordance with the series' interpretation of biblical prophecy, Carpathia is overthrown with the return of Jesus, who cast him, along with his false prophet Fortunato, into the Lake of Fire to suffer for all eternity. Before his eternal sentence is carried out, Satan is cast out of Carpathia, rendering Carpathia to his rotting corpse-like remains, the state his body would have been in had Satan not resurrected him prior. He then kneels before Christ and declares him the Christ after Jesus judged him for all his crimes and sins against humanity and God. He also admits, at the feet of Jesus, that his entire life was a waste and that he rebelled against a God that he never knew loved him. Unlike Fortunato, who attempted to struggle with Michael the Archangel out of his sentence, Carpathia accepted his fate out of his own guilt and shame, and simply covered his eyes as he passively allowed the archangel to throw him in.

==== One thousand years later ====
One thousand years later, a brief glimpse of Carpathia and Leon Fortunato is seen as the Lake of Fire opens to swallow up Satan. Carpathia is still writhing in agony as he is tortured in fire and brimstone, repeating over and over that Jesus is Lord. The scene closes, and Carpathia's suffering—along with that of his master and his underling—is resumed for all eternity.

=== Carpathianism ===
Carpathianism is a fictional religion established by Leon to worship Nicolae Carpathia, leaving it as the only legal religion on Earth. Failure to comply results in death. The religion lasts for three and a half years before meeting its downfall at the Second Coming of Christ.

Carpathianism draws heavily from the narratives and traditions of Christianity, Judaism, and Islam. After his death and resurrection, Carpathia proclaims himself God in the desecrated Temple of the Holy of Holies, an act that is considered blasphemous in all three Abrahamic religions. He orders golden statues of himself to be placed prominently and worshiped three times a day. This touches on the golden calf story found in both the Old Testament and the Quran. In reference to the Book of Revelation, Carpathia introduces the mandatory mark known as the Mark of the Beast.

=== Real-world trivia ===
Some aspects of Nicolae Carpathia appear to be based on historical Romanian president Nicolae Ceaușescu – in particular, his name, cult of personality, and strongarm tactics.

Carpathia is derived from the English name for Romania's Carpathian Mountains, and is not a Romanian name. The mountains are locally called the Munții Carpați, and an authentic surname derived from the mountains would be Carpatescu.

== Annie Christopher ==
Angela "Annie" Christopher grows up in an atheist home in Canada. After losing some friends in the rapture, she begins searching, but becomes a fan of Nicolae Carpathia. While in the air going to New Babylon to work for him, the Wrath of the Lamb earthquake hits, killing all her family.

She is described as having short black hair and being athletically built.

In New Babylon she becomes a believer and meets David Hassid. In Assassins, David introduces her to Mac McCullum and Abdullah Smith, Carpathia's pilots who are also believers. She and David get engaged but cannot marry until they escape.

On the day of Nicolae Carpathia's funeral and resurrection, she is killed by the ensuing storm – by a painless lightning strike. The death is not confirmed until the book The Mark, when Hannah Palemoon finds her body in the morgue and takes David to see it.

Annie is also mentioned in Left Behind: The Kids when Judd and Lionel are at Carpathia's funeral, and Judd witnesses her death by lightning.

== Ryan Daley ==
Ryan Daley is a fictional character from Left Behind: The Kids.

A distant relative of Chicago mayors Richard J. Daley and Richard M. Daley, Ryan is best friends with Rayford "Raymie" Steele Jr., Rayford Steele's son, and the two often have much fun together. His mother and father, unbelievers, die in vehicular accidents caused by events after the rapture. He is the last one of the four Young Trib Force charter members to become a believer, due to his atheist background and grief in his parents' loss. Ryan finds a dog and names it Phoenix shortly after joining the Force. He and Lionel often clash to the point of brawling, yet are still very close. Following the death of Bruce Barnes, Ryan is kidnapped along with a girl named Darrion Stahley. He helps Darrion escape her captors and she also becomes a believer. After her mother's death, Darrion remains with members of the Young Trib Force until the Glorious Appearing. Ryan accompanies Judd Thompson to Israel and saves the life of Thompson, who has been captured by the GC for having a tape containing the truth about the murders of Tsion Ben-Judah's family. Ryan dies a couple days after the Wrath of the Lamb earthquake, having had a chunk of debris fall on him, causing his legs to become paralyzed and a wound in his back to become badly infected, from which he dies soon afterward.

== Tyrola ("T") Mark Delanty ==
Tyrola Mark Delanty becomes a believer and a member of the Tribulation Force. He is in charge of the airstrip that Ken Ritz had used. Rayford Steele meets him when the plague of locusts strikes, attacking all unbelievers. T also helps Buck Williams and Chaim Rosenzweig escape from Israel on a plane that crashes in Greece, killing him.

== Hattie Durham ==
Before the Rapture, Hattie Durham is a senior flight attendant, young and beautiful, working for Pan-Continental Airlines. She seems to be attracted to Pan-Con pilot Rayford Steele, perhaps wanting an affair with him. Late into the night, halfway to London from O'Hare, many awake to find that loved ones and others have vanished, leaving behind everything material, ranging from clothes and hearing aids to tooth fillings. Terrified by the events, Hattie informs Rayford about the event, thinking he does not know what has just happened. When they return to Chicago, Hattie begs Rayford to stay with her, but he refuses, wanting to check on his family. A few days later she arrives at his house, pleading for him to come with her, but he tells her he found what he was missing, Jesus Christ, and that the disappearances was the Rapture. However, she declines, thinking he has gone crazy after losing his wife and son, and leaves without him.

Hattie, who convinces Buck to introduce her to Nicolae Carpathia, eventually becomes Carpathia's personal secretary, and later his lover. Rayford and the other members of the Tribulation Force attempt to convince her that Carpathia is evil, but she refuses to listen. After becoming pregnant with Nicolae's child and being engaged to him, Carpathia attempts to poison her, but the child takes the brunt of the poison and dies. Hattie is eventually sent to the Belgium Facility for Female Rehabilitation (BFFR, or "Buffer") when Carpathia realizes she would be a liability to him. She is rescued by members of the Tribulation Force. She is then convinced of the truth of God's Word, and she becomes a devout Christian. She is eventually killed by Leon Fortunato, who calls down a bolt of lightning to vaporize her.

Hattie is resurrected at the Glorious Appearing of Jesus Christ, to the great delight of Rayford and the rest of God's followers. She is awarded a crown from Jesus himself, who praises her for her bravery in the face of certain death. She also appears briefly in Kingdom Come, as she is among those present at Mac McCullum's thousandth birthday party and is assumedly with the rest of the Trib Force as they gather to watch the end of the Millennium. Hattie is played by Chelsea Noble in the films, Nicky Whelan in the 2014 film, and Kathryn Kohut in Left Behind: Rise of the Antichrist.

== Gerald Fitzhugh ==
Gerald Fitzhugh is the President of the United States at the time of the Rapture. In the first novel, he is shown to be openly welcoming of Nicolae Carpathia, but gradually becomes more suspicious.

In Tribulation Force, with his power and countries independence fading, Fitzhugh plans with the British and Egyptian governments to launch a worldwide offensive against Carpathia and the Global Community, with help from various militias. When a combined British and Egyptian attack on New Babylon backfires, the conflict escalates into World War III. Cities around the world are destroyed in the war, and Fitzhugh himself is killed by a Global Community blitzkrieg on Washington D.C.

In the film Left Behind: World at War, Fitzhugh is played by Louis Gossett Jr.

The character's name appears to be an allusion to John Fitzgerald Kennedy.

== Leon Fortunato ==
Leon Fortunato
- Left Behind character
- First appearance: The Regime
- Last appearance: Glorious Appearing
- Created by: Tim LaHaye and Jerry B. Jenkins

In-universe information
- Gender: Male
- Title(s): Global Community Supreme Commander (formerly); Most High Reverend Father
- Occupation: Politician
- Religion: Catholicism, later Carpathianism
- Nationality: Italian

Leon Fortunato is the False Prophet, and he is a key member of the inner circle of Nicolae Carpathia, businessman, financier, politician, and Antichrist.

In his native Italy, Leon grew up fascinated with the trappings of Catholicism, although never truly believing in any of the Church's teachings; Leon simply likes the glory. He is fond of dressing in ornate and flowing robes and strutting all over his college campus. After being expelled, Fortunato grows fond of becoming a kingmaker, preferring to work behind the scenes to elevate his chosen candidates to any positions of power they wanted. Carpathia, wanting to enter politics himself, employs Leon on his staff, and grows to value the man's counseling; although Leon tends to be clingy and sycophantic, he teaches Carpathia humility (or more specifically, how to feign humility), which proves to be very valuable on the world political stage.

When Carpathia creates the Global Community, he appoints Leon to the position of Supreme Commander, the deputy to Nicolae's Supreme Potentate.

Throughout his relationship with Carpathia, Fortunato continues to fawn over the man, a fact that seems to be driven home when Leon dies in the Wrath of the Lamb earthquake. He has been buried and crushed in the rubble of the GC headquarters complex and his mother is calling him home, when he hears a voice – Carpathia's – calling out "LEONARDO, COME FORTH!" in imitation of a command that Jesus Christ gave to Lazarus. Leon is revived, and becomes more faithful than ever to Carpathia, believing that Carpathia is a god incarnate. Like Nicolae, Leon regularly communicates with the 'spirit world'; it is implied that both men shared the same spiritual 'guide' – Satan himself.

Later, when Carpathia is assassinated by Dr. Rosenzweig and resurrected as prophesied, Fortunato becomes even more important, and is Carpathia's go-to man and second-in-command. Leon becomes the Most High Reverend Father of the new religion of Carpathianism. He is imbued with power from Lucifer and is able to kill believers (such as Annie Christopher) with the Satanic ability to call down fire from the sky, either as lightning from a cloudless blue sky (as he did in killing three opposing sub-potentates during Carpathia's funeral) or as a single ball of flame (in the slaying of Hattie Durham), and is officially identified as the False Prophet that aids the Antichrist. In The Remnant, he is given the task of training a legion of wizards, priests and miracle-workers, who are also bestowed with various similar demonic abilities.

Fortunato's "glory days" are short-lived, however, ending in Glorious Appearing with the return of Jesus. In Fortunato's final moments of life, he reveals his true self: a babbling, incoherent coward. He kneels before Jesus and acknowledges him as Lord without hesitation. As Jesus lays out his crimes against humanity and the will of God, Fortunato pleads for mercy and forgiveness, even attempting to reject Carpathia and Satan, and pledging allegiance to Jesus. However, it is already too late for Leon and Jesus sentences him to eternity in the lake of fire. Unlike Carpathia, who accepts his fate, Leon struggles with Michael as the archangel throws him into the lake of fire.

The world catches a final glimpse of both Carpathia and Fortunato at the end of the Millennium World, when Satan himself is thrown into the lake of fire. Fortunato writhes in pain, shouting "Jesus is Lord!" The scene closes and Fortunato's suffering is resumed for all eternity.

=== Critical reception ===
Leon Fortunato has been described as Nicolae Carpathia's sidekick. Because he is Italian American, he has been cited as an example of the cultural diversity of the novels' characters. In The Mark, Fortunato is revealed to be the Left Behind series' incarnation of the False Prophet described in the Book of Revelation. One critic has condemned the silliness of Fortunato's titles as being anti-Catholic and populist. There have also been complaints about the farcical characterization of Leon Fortunato when he suffers from the pain of a hemorrhoid in Desecration.

== David Hassid ==
David Hassid is assigned to Global Community Headquarters Palace, New Babylon, United Holy Land States as Director of Purchasing. He oversees all purchases for the GC and the hangar and cockpit crew of the Condor 216 and the Phoenix 216.

Hassid works in New Babylon in the global government headed by Supreme Potentate and Antichrist Nicolae Carpathia. He converts from Judaism to Christianity and is spotted by Mac McCullum in the GC shelter right after the Wrath of the Lamb earthquake.

Hassid works in communications and is considered one of the top computer experts alive. His service to the Tribulation Force is to confound communications, tip off the Trib Force and arrange for goods to be "mislaid" and end up in the hands of the Tribulation saints.

Immediately after Carpathia's assassination, Hassid has to work with artist Guy Blod, who is making a huge statue of Carpathia. Hassid and Blod clash, but eventually, Hassid realizes he must get along with Blod or risk discipline and possible exposure as a Tribulation saint; also, it is not very Christ-like to be promoting enmity. Hassid's love interest, Phoenix 216 cargo chief Annie Christopher, dies as a result of false prophet Leon Fortunato's Satan-imbued ability to call down lightning from heaven to kill any non-Carpathianist. David vomits on Carpathia during a meeting. Hassid begins grooming Chang Wong, a young man from China who is also very technically gifted, as his protégé and replacement when Hassid must leave; the mark of loyalty is now required of employees in New Babylon, and Chang, given the mark unwillingly, has both the mark of the Beast and the mark of God's on his forehead.

After his death is faked, Hassid starts setting up communications in Petra, to prepare for the remnant of Israel's arrival during the fifth year of the Tribulation.

Hassid is killed by two GC MIAs at Petra, before the remnant actually arrives in Petra.

== Judd Thompson Jr. ==
Judd Thompson, Jr is a fictional character and one of the four main protagonists in the Left Behind: The Kids series of novels by Tim LaHaye and Jerry B. Jenkins. He, along with, Vicki, Lionel, and Ryan, are the first original members of The Young Tribulation Force. Judd is born to a Christian family. His name comes from his father, which he has hated ever since. On the night on the rapture, Judd decides to run away. He steals money from his father's credit card and lies to both of his parents, telling them that he is going to the library to study. Instead, Judd goes to O'Hare Airport and boards a plane heading to London.

After hearing about the strange disappearances of his fellow passengers, Judd realizes that what he has been told in church is true. Afterwards, Judd gets off his plane and meets up with Bruce Barnes. Bruce is a pastor, believer, and the only member of the staff left behind. He initially meets other protagonists Vicki Byrne, Lionel Washington, and Ryan Daley. As the four take a liking to each other, they form The Young Tribulation Force.

He allows Vicki, Ryan, and Lionel to stay at his house until they are forced to flee because of the Global Community. Bruce and Judd go on a few international trips, the last of which is shortly before Bruce's death. Following the earthquake and Ryan's death, the Young Trib force live in a cave until they can escape to a safer hideout. Zeke then gives them a new ID. He resists going to the schoolhouse, as he and Vicki have a massive falling out. He eventually goes in order to warn the kids about Wormwood. Due to their disagreements, Vicki lets him and Lionel go to the Gala in Israel. The trip is meant to last a week but ends up lasting around three years. A girl in Israel falls in love with him; however, she gets shot. Before dying, she writes him a letter saying she feels like there is somebody back home that he loves. He realizes she is referring to Vicki. He proposes to Vicki after his return, and they marry about a year before the Glorious Appearing, where he and Vicki are both in Jerusalem.

== Peter Mathews ==
Peter Mathews is the archbishop of Cincinnati, Ohio, at the time of the Rapture. He is described as a very traditional Roman Catholic at this time, although he rapidly embraces dramatic changes to the faith after the Rapture. Shortly after the Rapture, Mathews participates in key meetings to establish the Global Community Faith (shortly after, it is renamed Enigma Babylon One World Faith) and is also elected to replace Pope John XXIV who has been raptured.

Calling himself Supreme Pontiff and Pontifex Maximus, Mathews becomes the leader of Enigma Babylon, adopts the name Peter the Second, and considers the new faith organization to be at least as important as the Global Community and himself an equal of Supreme Potentate and Antichrist Nicolae Carpathia.

Mathews is later assassinated—stabbed with icicles from an ice sculpture—by the ten "kings" that Carpathia appoints to lead the world under his rule. His body is then incinerated, and it is reported that he had died of a contagious disease that causes its victims to bleed out through the mucus membranes.

== Montgomery Cleburn ("Mac") McCullum ==
Montgomery "Mac" McCullum is a pilot for Carpathia, good friend of Rayford 'Ray' Steele, and chief Tribulation Force pilot assigned to Petra. He is a witness to the Glorious Appearing and resides near the Valley of Jehoshaphat.

== Walter Moon ==
Walter Moon

Global Community Supreme Commander
- In office The Mark – Desecration
- Leader: Nicolae Carpathia; GC Supreme Potentate
- Preceded by: James Hickman
- Succeeded by: Position Dissolved

Personal details
- Born: Unknown
- Died: New Bablyon
- Profession: Politician

Walter Moon is a supporting antagonist in the Left Behind series. He is a prominent member of the Global Community who is promoted to the role of Supreme Commander after Leon Fortunato's promotion to High Reverend Father of Carpathianism and Jim Hickman's death. Before that, he served as Director of Security for the Global Community. After his death, the Supreme Commander position is dissolved.

Moon begs Carpathia to be the first to bear his mark and swears that he will bear it with endless pride. In Desecration, he gets his wish when he receives the mark of the beast along with his fellow members of the Global Community cabinet – Suhail Akbar and Viv Ivins – at the Temple Mount a day before Nicolae Carpathia commits the abomination of desolation. He receives a dark negative six on his forehead for his mark of loyalty. Carpathia expresses his disappointment when he expresses some misgivings about Carpathia's plans to attack the Christians and Jews who are assembled at the Mount of Olives, Mizpe Ramon, Masada and Petra by referring to Micah's threat that an attack will bring back the plague of the sores or turn the waters of the world into blood. The final straw for Carpathia is his failure to promptly terminate a hijacked broadcast of Tsion Ben-Judah delivering a message from Global Community's own television network. Angered by the appearance of Ben-Judah on television, a choleric Carpathia shoots Moon to death when Moon's frantic pleas to the network fail to terminate the broadcast.

== Hannah Palemoon ==
Hannah Palemoon is a fictional character in the Left Behind series. She is a Native American nurse working for the Global Community in New Babylon. She meets David Hassid when he passes out from sunstroke while looking for Annie Christopher. Hannah later escapes New Babylon with David Hassid, Mac McCullum and Abdullah Smith. She and Leah also serve as nurses during Operation Eagle. After an e-mail feud with David, she goes with Rayford, Mac, and Leah Rose to the city of Petra to investigate a disturbance. She is grief-stricken to find that David has been killed by two MIA GC soldiers, and has a hand in killing both men so as to keep Petra safe for the Remnant to move in. She goes back to the US and stays with a co-op flyer and his wife until she moves to Petra with Leah, where she helps tend the wounded with her medical expertise. She is one of the Tribulation Force members still alive at the Glorious Appearing.

== Steve Plank ==
Prior to the Rapture, Plank is the executive editor of Global Weekly magazine, and the boss of Cameron "Buck" Williams. Within two weeks of the Rapture, Plank accepts a post as press secretary for rising international political leader Nicolae Carpathia, and nominates Buck to take his place as senior editor.

Plank falls under Carpathia's spell and serves him faithfully until he becomes surplus to Nicolae's needs. He disappears for several years, presumably lost in the Great Wrath of The Lamb earthquake when the Global Community Headquarters in New Babalyon collapsed.

Plank resurfaces shortly after the midpoint of the Tribulation, using the alias Pinkerton Stephens, and is a believer in Christ. Rayford Steele and Albie encounter him in The Mark working undercover as a GC operative in Pueblo, Colorado. He is badly disfigured and wears a prosthetic to hide the fact that most of his face is missing as a result of injuries caused by the Wrath of the Lamb earthquake. Though he is hideously disfigured, the seal of the believer is visible on his forehead.

After revealing his true identity to Rayford and Albie, he helps them rescue Hattie Durham from the very facility where he has been working undercover.

Plank next appears in The Remnant, when the GC brass order all personnel without Carpathia's mark of loyalty obtain it immediately. After agonizing in prayer, Plank surrenders himself to the GC, refusing to take the mark. Even while choosing to place his head on the guillotine at the loyalty mark processing center, Plank uses wit and disarming cooperation as he is positioned for execution, bantering good-naturedly with his executioners, and trading quips about the stand-in executioner owing him a favour for assisting in operating the guillotine.

Steve Plank is named for Steve Board, one of author Jerry B. Jenkins' early bosses while a journalist.

== Razor ==
Razor is a Mexican military officer in his mid-twenties at the San Diego Tribulation Force fortress. He is introduced in Armageddon shortly after Chloe Steele Williams disappears. He is very military-like, and refers to men that he speaks with as "Sirs," which he eventually quits doing after Cameron "Buck" Williams tells him enough times.

He acquired his name from a snowmobile accident in Minnesota before the Rapture when he hit some razor wire and should have died.

He leads a band of about four men and a woman at the safe house. They discovered Chloe's Uzi and ski mask near two platoons of Global Community Peacekeepers. By that point, they assume the worst and know she has been captured.

== Ken Ritz ==
Ken Ritz, a fictional character of the Left Behind series, is a private pilot. Once a commercial airline pilot, Ritz was sacked because he was too much of a stickler for safety. He went into charter business, and by the time of the Rapture, he owns a small fleet of aircraft based at Chicago-area airports.

The second day after the Rapture, Ritz provides Buck Williams with a flight as close to New York City as possible. The conversation they share is instrumental in the start of Ritz's journey to salvation, although the novels do not indicate any further services by Ritz to Buck until some 18 months into the Tribulation. Then, Ritz flies Buck to Israel where he locates and rescues Tsion Ben-Judah, and Ritz flies them safely back to America.

Ritz is badly injured in the Wrath of the Lamb earthquake, when an airplane wing hits the back of his head. However, given the urgency of the circumstances, he flies Buck to Minneapolis to rescue Chloe Steele Williams before she is taken by Global Community operatives to be used as a bargaining chip. He manages to fly Buck and Chloe back to Chicago, and is shortly afterward employed to take Buck to Denver to pluck Hattie Durham from the GC. On arrival at the safe house to begin the flight to Denver, he shows that he has become a believer.

In Apollyon, Ritz is killed by a GC bullet to the head while racing with Ben-Judah, Chloe, and Buck to board a waiting plane at Jerusalem Airport to return to the United States. The catalyst for the shooting is the detected theft of GC Chopper One to pluck the threesome from the roof of Israeli botanist and statesman Chaim Rosenzweig's house.

Later, Chloe and Buck name their child Kenneth Bruce Williams in honor of Ken. He is resurrected in Glorious Appearing with the other martyred saints.

== Leah Rose ==
Former head nurse at Arthur Young Memorial Hospital in Palatine, Illinois, she helps Cameron "Buck" Williams get Ken Ritz out without compromising the Tribulation Force's cover, and after helping deliver Hattie Durham's stillborn baby fathered by Antichrist Nicolae Carpathia, abandons her now-compromised job and must request sanctuary at the Trib Force safe house.

Leah and Rayford Steele clash as they attempt to work together. Leah's first Trib Force undercover mission, at the midpoint of the Tribulation, takes her to Belgium to try to communicate with Hattie at the Belgium Facility for Female Rehabilitation (BFFR), or "Buffer." There, she meets Ming Toy, another believer with a strategic position inside the Global Community. Ming helps Leah avoid suspicion and incarceration, and Leah returns to Illinois.

She helps out at Operation Eagle as a nurse, and goes to live with a co-op pilot and his wife when the Chicago safe house is compromised.

She and Hannah Palemoon move to Petra and help run the hospital there. Leah also helps Rayford Steele in Glorious Appearing after an almost fatal ATV wreck. She is among the few believers left alive when Jesus Christ returns to earth.

== Chaim Rosenzweig ==
Chaim Rosenzweig is an Israeli botanist and statesman, discoverer of a formula which makes the Israeli desert bloom, former Global Weekly Man of the Year. He is also the murderer of Carpathia, leader of the million-plus Jewish remnant at Petra, witness to the Glorious Appearing, and now resides near the Valley of Jehoshaphat.

Chaim is Carpathia's friend for the first half of the tribulation; Chaim believes in him with all of his heart. However, through infiltration of the GC Palace by the Trib Force and Buck and Tsion's conversations with him, Chaim is led to murder Carpathia. He fakes a stroke, gets a wheelchair, and hides a hand-filed blade in the handle. When Rayford Steele accidentally shoots the Saber, Carpathia staggers, trips, and falls backwards into the blade being held in Chaim's hands. Chaim later becomes a believer, and leads the Jewish Remnant at Petra under the alias "Micah" (an acronym of his name).

In the Left Behind films, he is portrayed by Colin Fox and David LeReaney.

== Irene Steele ==
Before the Rapture, Irene is married to the series' chief protagonist, Rayford Steele. Together they have two children, Chloe and Raymie. After becoming a born-again Christian, Irene becomes desperate for her family to have the same salvation she has. She eventually gets through to her son, Raymie, who becomes a Christian and helps her cope with Rayford's and Chloe's indecisiveness toward God. She even counsels Rayford's parents, who are struggling with Alzheimer's, leading them both to salvation before their deaths. Through the counseling of her friend Jackie, Irene tries to turn the rest of her family towards Christ, but to no avail.

Rayford becomes more and more distant over the years, and Irene suspects he is having an affair. Chloe leaves home to go to college, having never let go of her "show me" attitude. Just as Irene is at the height of her desperation, the Rapture occurs. Irene and Raymie are among the countless millions of believers who are taken up into the House of God, where the Bema Seat Judgment takes place. At first, Irene is nervous when her works are tested by the fire because of her short time as a Christian, but her efforts are ultimately praised by Jesus.

After the Marriage Supper of the Lamb, Irene and the rest of the raptured saints wait and enjoy life in Heaven. On Earth, the cosmic battle of the ages takes place as the Tribulation ravages the planet. Irene returns with the heavenly hosts at the Glorious Appearing of Christ, reuniting with her husband, her daughter, and her young grandson, Kenny Bruce Williams. She is also thrilled to meet Cameron "Buck" Williams, Chloe's husband.

In Kingdom Come, Irene and her husband lead a missionary trip to Egypt, where they lead many to salvation during the Millennium World. She is present at the final battle at the end of the Millennium where Christ overthrows evil once and for all and welcomes all believers into the Kingdom of Heaven for eternity.

== Rayford Steele ==
Rayford Steele is a former 747 pilot for Pan-Con Airlines and loses his first wife (Irene) and only son (Raymie Jr.) in the Rapture. Shortly after that, he becomes a born-again believer, begins working for Global Community, and flies Carpathia's private jet until his cover is blown. His daughter Chloe also becomes a believer, and he has a grandson, Kenny Bruce. He loses his second wife, Amanda, in a plane crash. Steele is an original member of the Tribulation Force and is wanted for supposedly murdering Nicolae Carpathia. He is a witness to the Glorious Appearing and now resides near the Valley of Jehoshaphat. He was portrayed by Brad Johnson in the films, Nicolas Cage in the 2014 film, and Kevin Sorbo in Left Behind: Rise of the Antichrist.

== Raymie Steele ==
Raymie is the second child and only son of Rayford and Irene Steele. He was raptured, along with his mother, when Jesus returned before the Tribulation. Throughout the Left Behind Series, he frequently comes to the mind of Rayford—who was left behind due to his unbelief. He is also the best friend of Ryan Daley. Ryan is a member of the Young Tribulation Force in the Left Behind The Kids Series.

In Kingdom Come, he works in Jerusalem with his older sister, Chloe Steele, who was executed during the Tribulation for her belief, and her husband, Buck Williams, who also died during the Tribulation during the final battle in Jerusalem. During the Millennium World, Chloe and Buck are in charge of a massive childcare center, whose speaking guests include Noah and King David.

Raymie founds the Millennium Force, a small group dedicated to sharing the Word of God with the undecideds during the Millennium World. When his nephew, Kenny Bruce Williams, attempts to infiltrate a Luciferian organization called The Other Light, Raymie becomes worried by the level of the devotion the "mole" is showing. He later kicks Kenny out of the Force after evidence surfaces that indicates that Kenny has "switched sides." Kenny is later vindicated, however, and Raymie is overjoyed to welcome his nephew back into the Force.

He is assumedly present at Cameron's estate during the final battle of the Millennium. He, like other believers, is welcomed into Paradise at the end of both the Millennium and time itself.

As he receives a glorified body, he never ages, while his nephew does.

== Jonathan Stonagal ==
Jonathan Stonagal is a powerful, corrupt, and highly influential American financier with links to Viv Ivins' Luciferian organization. Apart from controlling most of the world's largest financial institutions and being the richest man in history, he also owns the genetic engineering company that artificially inseminated Nicolae Carpathia's mother Marilena. As her son Nicolae comes of age, Stonagal becomes one of his mentors, financing his rise in the corporate world.

At his first meeting as United Nations Secretary-General (at the end of Left Behind Book 1), Carpathia executes Stonagal with a revolver, believing that his usefulness has expired. The same bullet that kills Stonagal also kills Joshua Todd-Cothran, the head of the London Stock Exchange, believed responsible for plotting an attempt on Buck Williams' life earlier in the book as well as murdering many of his acquaintances. Carpathia then brainwashes everyone in the room (except Williams, who is protected by God) into believing that Stonagal shot himself and Todd-Cothran in remorse for the assassinations.

In Tribulation Force (Book 2), Carpathia tells Williams that he has been named the sole beneficiary in Stonagal's will, though Stonagal's family members will receive massive payoffs to silence them. This effectively bestows on Carpathia the financial resources and clout needed for his intended takeover of the world's media and information networks, granting him a media monopoly.

The name Stonagal appears to be a pun on Rockefeller.

== Eleazar Tiberias ==
Eleazer Tiberias is one of the elders at Petra, who helps Micah (aka Chaim Rosenzweig) run the operations of the city of the remnant. Eleazar's wife converts to Christianity before dying of an illness, and Eleazar, who otherwise loves his wife greatly, rejects his dying wife's pleas to convert, and instead disowns her and slips into depression. The events of the Rapture happen; Eleazar listens to Tsion Ben-Judah's television broadcast on the Messiah and converts. Eleazar is one of the 144,000 evangelical converts in the book. Eleazar's daughter is Naomi Tiberias.

== Naomi Tiberias ==
Naomi Tiberias is the teenage daughter of Eleazar Tiberias, one of the elders at Petra, who help Micah (aka Chaim Rosenzweig) run the operations of the city of the remnant. Naomi's mother converts to Christianity before dying of an illness.

Naomi is one of the "techies" in Petra, and assists Chang Wong in setting up technology within Petra. After helping rescue Chang from New Babylon they become very close, but decide to postpone marriage until the Millennium Kingdom.

She and her father take in single women and families after the return of Christ.

== Joshua Todd-Cothran ==
Joshua Todd-Cothran is the head of the London Stock Exchange who, along with his colleague Jonathan Stonagal, is depicted as a highly influential financier. In the narrative, journalist Cameron "Buck" Williams suspects Todd-Cothran of orchestrating assassinations of professional acquaintances and framing Williams for the car bomb murder of Scotland Yard agent Alan Tompkins. Williams also suspects Todd-Cothran has framed him for the car bomb murder of Scotland Yard agent and close friend Alan Tompkins, who had grown suspicious of Todd-Cothran's practices.

At his first meeting as United Nations Secretary-General (at the end of Left Behind), Nicolae Carpathia executes Stonagal and Todd-Cothran with a single bullet that passes through Stonagal's head, then Todd-Cothran's. Carpathia explains to Buck that he is fulfilling his promise to take care of Buck's problem, knowing that Todd-Cothran is responsible for plotting the attempt on Williams' life earlier in the book as well as the assassinations. Carpathia then brainwashes everyone in the room (except Buck, who was protected by God) into believing that it was Stonagal who shot himself and Todd-Cothran in remorse for the assassinations.

== Ming Toy ==
Ming Toy is the older sister of Chang Wong. She was a former Global Community employee working at Buffer who is a believer.

She was formerly married but is left a widow during the early years of the Tribulation. She joins the Tribulation Force in The Mark, escaping Buffer when the "mark of loyalty" is tested on prisoners.

She travels to China under the guise of a Global Community Peacekeeper officer named Chang Chow in order to find her parents who have become believers, and discovers that while her mother was still alive, her father died a martyr.

She later falls in love with and marries Ree Woo in Armageddon. Toy makes it to the Glorious Appearing.

== Lionel Washington ==
His whole family are the most devout Christians he knows, and he pretends to go along with them. The only one he can connect with is his Uncle André, who goes from being drunk and a gambler one week to a "devout Christian" the next. All of his family disappears in the Rapture, except André, who dies after being shot by LeRoy Banks and is trapped in a fire in his apartment complex. Lionel becomes a Christian and acknowledges that Jesus has raptured his church. He spends the next seven years proselytizing, spending most of his time with Judd and Bruce Barnes. He has to amputate his left arm after it is crushed in a rock slide while he and Judd are traveling back to the rest of the Young Tribulation Force from their adventures in the Middle East. However, he gains it back when Jesus returns at the end of the series. He comes to stay in Petra after the marriage of Judd and Vicki, where he is best man. At the end of the series, he goes to Jerusalem with the other believers.

Lionel is the only primary character from the main protagonists in the Left Behind: The Kids series to appear in the adult novels. This occurs in Left Behind when he speaks to Buck Williams, who at the time works for the same paper as Lionel's mother, Lucinda Washington.

== Amanda White ==
Amanda White is the second wife of Rayford Steele, and marries him in World at War. They are engaged and married on the same day as Chloe and Buck.

She dies in a plane crash in Soul Harvest. She is thought to be subversive after death due to messages planted by Hattie Durham, who later clears Amanda's name when poisoned by Nicolae. She appears in Glorious Appearing with Rayford's first wife, Irene.

Sam Sorbo portrays Amanda in Left Behind: Rise of the Antichrist.

== Cameron ("Buck") Williams ==
Cameron ("Buck") Williams is an award-winning journalist and former senior publisher of Global Community Weekly, who becomes a believer before the murder of Jonathan Stonagal. He marries his wife, Chloe, in a double wedding with Rayford Steele (his new father-in-law) and Amanda White. He has one son, Kenny Bruce Williams. Williams is the author of the underground cyber-magazine The Truth. He dies less than 24 hours before the Glorious Appearing. He and his wife are gifted to teach children during the millennium in a place called Children of the Tribulation (COT), which is located in Israel; towards the end, their son Kenny expands it to Greece. He is portrayed in the films by Kirk Cameron, Chad Michael Murray in the 2014 film, and by Greg Parrow in Left Behind: Rise of the Antichrist.

== Chloe Steele Williams ==
Chloe Steele Williams, daughter of Rayford Steele and wife of Buck Williams, was a former college student. She loses her mother and brother in the rapture and becomes a believer in Christ. She marries Buck and has a son called Kenneth Bruce Williams, after Ken Ritz, the pilot, and Bruce Barnes, who leads Buck, Rayford, and Chloe (CEO of the International Commodity co-op) to Christ. She is beheaded shortly before the Battle of Armageddon. She is portrayed by Janaya Stephens in the films, Cassi Thomson in the 2014 film, and Sarah Fisher in Left Behind: Rise of the Antichrist.

== Kenneth Bruce Williams ==
Kenny Bruce Williams is the son of Cameron "Buck" Williams and Chloe Steele Williams, named after martyred believers Ken Ritz and Bruce Barnes. He is born during the Tribulation, in the book Apollyon. He is taken care of by his grandfather, Rayford Steele, when Buck goes to Jerusalem to help defend it in Armageddon. He is reunited with his parents in Glorious Appearing. Jesus promises Buck and Chloe that because they lost Kenny they would be repaid by the hundredfold. They start a massive daycare ministry called Children of the Tribulation (COT), which focuses on teaching children that Jesus is the only way. Kenny is the first child in COT.

Some ninety years later, Kenny is working at COT and is now living on his own. When one of the workers, Cendrillon Jospin, dies at one hundred, it creates an uproar among the believers since only unbelievers die. Not wanting anyone to follow Cendrillon's path, but knowing many will, Kenny, Raymie Steele, Bahira Ababneh, and Zaki Ababneh form the Millennium Force, a branch off of the Tribulation Force.

At Cendrillon's funeral, Kenny (who has the only non-glorified body of the four) meets Cendrillon's cousins from France, who are in deep with The Other Light (TOL), a secret organization that worships Lucifer. He goes undercover for the Millennium Force. He also meets Ekaterina Risto and falls in love with her. When a friend of Zaki, Qasim Marid, goes undercover for the Force without their permission, they all start to wonder where his loyalties lie. When Kenny goes to France, he meets up with the Johpins and their other cousin, Nicolette. They head to Jordan where Kenny is seen by Abdullah Smith. After being accused of switching loyalties, he is kicked out of the Millennium Force, deserted by Ekaterina, and hardly believed by his parents.

This causes Kenny's life to fall apart, and while he is extremely lonely, he trusts in God to deliver him in the end. Kat finally goes to talk to Kenny and realizes that he is innocent. Qasim is discovered as the real infiltrator at COT and fired, eventually dying at the age of one hundred along with the Johpins and Nicolette. Kenny later marries Kat and they have eight sons and six daughters. They go on to establish a branch of COT in Greece, as was Kat's lifelong dream.

As he is a natural, Kenny ages over the course of the Millennium, with both he and Kat unable to walk without walking sticks. Both Kenny and his wife are present at the final battle of the Millennium and they, along with all the other believers, are welcomed into heaven.

== Chang Wong ==
The brother of Ming Toy, he is 17 at the time of Global Community Supreme Potentate and Antichrist Nicolae Carpathia's temporary death. Chang is groomed by David Hassid to replace him as the Tribulation Force's mole in the GC Headquarters Palace in New Babylon. Hassid, who is a believer, cannot take the mark of the beast and so he flees, faking his death.

Chang is pressured to take the mark by his parents, who are Carpathia loyalists, but he violently protests as he is a believer in Jesus Christ. He is later drugged by his father, who forces the mark on him while he is incapacitated; Chang fears for his soul as a result, although he is reassured that he cannot be held responsible for taking the mark since it has been forced on him against his will.

Even though Chang appears to have the mark of loyalty, believers can still see the mark of God on him. He is able to continue as the Trib Force's mole until God strikes New Babylon with darkness; then he is rescued and relocated to Petra to work with the Remnant of Israel. There, he is prayed for by Tsion and others, and his mark of loyalty is miraculously removed by God.

Chang becomes romantically involved with Naomi Tiberias, but they decide to postpone marriage until a point beyond the Glorious Appearing.

== Gustaf Zuckermandel, Jr. (Zeke) ==
Gustaf Zuckermandel, Jr. (aka: Zeke or Little Zeke) is a fictional character in the Left Behind series. He is described as a "fleshy" young man in thick-soled, square-toed, black motorcycle boots, black jeans, black T-shirt, and black leather vest. He is the only son of Gustaf Zuckermandel Sr. (aka: "Big Zeke"). Zeke and his father are first introduced in Assassins.

After having lost his mother and two younger sisters in a fire the night of the rapture, he and his father are converted by a trucker stopping at their gas station. They start going to a secret church in Arlington Heights and running a black-market gas station. Zeke becomes a disguise specialist and master forger for the Tribulation Force and later joins them in Chicago after his dad is arrested for black marketeering. He transforms Chaim Rosenzweig into Micah in Desecration. He is one of the few believers left alive when Christ, with his armies, return to earth. Shortly after, he is reunited with his father, who returns from heaven with the armies of Christ.

He appears twice, albeit briefly, in the final novel, Kingdom Come, when he gives Abdullah Smith advice on how to go about infiltrating The Other Light, and later when both he and his father are present at Mac McCullum's thousandth birthday party.
