= Desecration (novel) =

Novel by Jerry B. Jenkins

Desecration: Antichrist Takes The Throne
- The Paperback Cover
- Author: Tim LaHaye and Jerry B. Jenkins
- Cover artist: Brian MacDonald
- Language: English
- Series: Left Behind Series
- Genre: Christian; Speculative Fiction; Post-apocalyptic fiction
- Publisher: Tyndale House Publishers
- Publication date: Tuesday, October 30, 2001
- Publication place: United States
- Media type: Print (hardback & paperback) also Audiobook
- Pages: 432
- ISBN: 0-8423-3226-X (hardback edition) & ISBN 0-8423-3229-4 (paperback edition)
- OCLC: 47045282
- Dewey Decimal: 813/.54 21
- LC Class: PS3562.A315 D47 2001
- Preceded by: The Mark
- Followed by: The Remnant

Desecration: Antichrist Takes the Throne is the ninth book in the Left Behind series. It was published on Tuesday, October 30, 2001, by Tyndale House. It was on The New York Times Best Seller list for 19 weeks, and was the best selling novel in the world in 2001. It takes place 42–43 months into the Tribulation and 25 days to a month into the Great Tribulation.

== Plot summary ==
Nicolae Carpathia is returning to Jerusalem to claim as his own the temple there and help begin the loyalty mark program. The Tribulation Force has called in contacts from around the world to help believing Jews in Israel escape to their place of refuge in the wilderness, Petra, in Operation Eagle. Rayford Steele and his assistants meet George Sebastian at their small airstrip at Mizpe Ramon in the Negev Desert, and he tries to give them arms to use against the Global Community (GC). Buck Williams is with Chaim Rosenzweig at a hotel in Jerusalem, leading up to Chaim's taking charge of the operation as a modern Moses. Chaim has an experience similar to the calling of Moses, as God speaks to him through Buck. Carpathia sets out on a mock journey along the Via Dolorosa on a pig, stopping at Golgotha and the Garden Tomb. Hattie publicly confronts him and is burned to death by Leon, the False Prophet.

Nicolae stages a gruesome and evil desecration of the temple. As millions take the Mark of the Beast, the first Bowl Judgment rains down as foul and loathsome sores appear on the bodies of all who have taken the mark, including Nicolae's inner circle. When the temple is defiled, millions of Jews and Gentiles rebel against Nicolae and many of them become believers.

The Tribulation Force launches "Operation Eagle". Leading them is none other than Dr. Chaim Rozensweig turned into a modern-day Moses, who, calling himself Micah, and along with Buck Williams, confronts Nicolae and leads the faithful to refuge. Meanwhile, David Hassid, the first to arrive at Petra, is murdered by two renegade GC soldiers left over from a confrontation between the Trib. Force and the GC. The second Bowl Judgment hits as all the oceans and seas turn into blood. Chang Wong settles into his role as the solitary Trib Force mole in New Babylon.

The prophetic "flood from the serpent's mouth" arrives in the form of a massive land offensive against those at Petra, but it is swallowed by the earth. Carpathia then kills Walter Moon for failing to take Tsion Ben-Judah off the air when Tsion was able to appear on the Global Community television when the Tribulation Force was able to hijack the network.

In Chicago, Chloe wanders off into the night and finds a group of believers (whom she eventually aids) hiding in a basement near the safe house. In Greece, the rescue of the two teenagers that Buck helped escape is attempted by the Trib Force's newest man: George Sebastian. One of the teens is replaced with a look-alike who kills the other teen, along with Lukas "Laslos" Miklos. George is captured and taken away. Returning to Chicago, members of the Force get their disguises together for various missions: Rayford and Abdullah to take Tsion to Petra, and Mac, Chloe, and Hannah heading to Greece to rescue George. Tsion Ben-Judah arrives at Petra to address the throng as the Antichrist launches an all-out attack against them.

The book ends with Nicolae hysterical as he believes he is about to wipe out one million believers, Rayford Steele and Tsion Ben-Judah among them.

== Characters ==
- Rayford Steele
- Cameron "Buck" Williams
- Chloe Steele Williams
- Dr. Tsion Ben-Judah
- David Hassid
- Mac McCullum
- His Excellency Global Community Potentate Nicolae Carpathia
- Most High Reverend of Carpathianism Leon Fortunato
- Dr. Chaim Rosenzweig aka: Micah
- Hattie Durham
- Leah Rose
- Kenny Bruce Williams
- Lukas "Laslos" Miklos, dies in this book
- Gustaf Zuckermandel Jr. (aka "Zeke" or "Z")
- Ming Toy
- Chang Wong
- Al B (aka: Albie)
- Abdullah Smith
- Viv Ivins
- Hannah Palemoon
- Pinkerton Stephens, aka Steve Plank
- Marcel Papadopoulos and Georgiana Stavros, freed by Buck from loyalty mark center, dies in this book

== Release ==
Desecration was first published in the United States on October 20, 2001, with a first run printing of 2.8 million copies. Stephen Scott noted that sales for the series and the latest novel had spiked after the September 11 attacks earlier that year.

Upon release the novel sold well and was the number one book on The New York Times Bestseller List from November 18 through December 2, 2001. It was also on the bestseller lists for USA Today and Publishers Weekly for its initial week of release. According to Publishers Weekly, Desecration was the bestselling novel of 2001, a spot that a journalist for The Orlando Sentinel had been held by John Grisham since 1994.

== Reception ==
Anne Byle of The Grand Rapids Press reviewed Desecration, stating that it was "fast-paced and full of action." A reviewer for the Santa Maria Times was also favorable, noting that it was an entertaining read that was occasionally slowly paced.

In his review in the San Francisco Chronicle, David Kipen criticized the series for what he saw as "cheap shots" at various people and topics such as the United Nation, further commenting that Desecration had terrible writing and that "the thriller form and fundamentalist Christianity just don't mix." John Keenan of the Omaha World-Herald was also critical of the writers' literary skill, while also stating that it was a "good, quick read".

== In popular culture ==
On the fourth episode of Season 4 of Glee, the Left Behind series, including the book Desecration, is discussed. The book was used to draw parallels between being left behind after the rapture and being left behind in life by those we love.
