= Riven (novel) =

2008 Christian novel by Jerry Jenkins

- First edition cover
- Author: Jerry B. Jenkins
- Publisher: Tyndale House Publishers
- Publication date: July 2008
- ISBN: 978-1-4143-0904-0

Riven is a Christian novel by American writer Jerry Jenkins, published by Tyndale House in 2008. It details the deathbed-conversion of a career criminal, and the involvement in it of a largely unsuccessful pastor turned prison-chaplain.

== Plot summary ==
=== Brady Darby's story ===
Sixteen-year-old Brady Wayne Darby and his eight-year-old brother Peter live in Touhy Avenue Trailer-Park with their alcoholic chain-smoking mother Erlene; Erlene's husband had abandoned her shortly after Peter's birth.

Brady, who dreams of buying a car and fleeing the trailer-park, has obtained a part-time job sweeping up the local launderette—from which he often takes a share of the coins in the machines' boxes to supplement his wages. At school, he is on the Football Team; however, he generally does not perform well academically, which causes him to be cut from the athletic squad—with a suggestion from the coach to try the Drama Club.

=== Thomas Carey's story ===
Forty six-year-old Thomas Carey, a pastor who has never been long at one church, finds a posting in Georgia. While going there, he and his wife Grace visit their twenty four-year-old daughter Ravinia, a law student at Emory University of whose spiritual position they have great concern.

The Careys are eventually driven out of this posting by the Selection Board chairman, who has decided hypocritically (as his own five sons have a combined-total of eight marriages) that Thomas Carey is a poor example of a Christian, having not raised Ravinia properly. They eventually move to Adamsville, OH where Carey is appointed as the chaplain of the Adamsville State Prison, a super-maximum-security facility which houses a death row. ASP's warden, Frank "Yanno" (so nicknamed due to his oft starting sentences with "yeah, no"—a nickname he dislikes to hear) LeRoy allows inmates condemned to death to choose their method of execution, assuming they will choose between:

- hanging (he boasts to Carey that ASP is one of the few prisons to still have a gallows)
- electrocution
- gas-chamber
- lethal-injection

When they reach Adamsville, Grace Carey is diagnosed as having a severe form of leukemia, for which inducing remission is possible for short-term, but not permanently.

=== Brady Darby's conversion ===
After Brady, now 30, is convicted of the horrific murder of twentythree-year-old Katie North (whom he believed to be in love with him), he is sentenced to death speedily—and though there is a mandatory appeals process which can take several (at least three) years, he informs his lawyer that he will be uncooperative so that his execution will be guaranteed. He is taken to ASP in Adamsville.

After his 90-day administrative-break-in period, Brady asks for a meeting with Carey, and is mailed a literature packet (which includes The Romans Road and a modern-English translation of the New Testament). Within a month, he asks for a personal visit from Carey so that he can "confess Christ with his mouth".

About six months into his time at ASP, Brady chooses the method of his execution—crucifixion, complete with thorn-crown and spear-pierce of his side after his death—which surprises not only Carey and Ravinia, but even Yanno who initially reacts that Brady must choose from the four methods he has in-situ. Ravinia is, however, able to persuade Yanno on this, as Brady's idea is to show exactly how ugly and cruel that first-century Roman punishment was. As Ohio's Director Of Corrections and its Governor argue against the appeals—successfully—and anti-death-penalty activists protest against the planned execution, the Government Of Israel donates a cross specifying it as "roughly of original Roman dimensions". Eventually, Brady's request to be crucified is granted—but his requests for thorn-crown and post-mortem piercing are denied.

As the date draws closer, Brady sees his mother claim on TV that she "had raised him to know Jesus" and that she is "glad he is coming back to his faith", and then wailing that she cannot fly from her current address in Florida to visit her son. The International Cable Network, which is covering the execution and its leadup, flies her to Adamsville for a visit. Brady, meanwhile, reads the Bible aloud for other inmates, hoping that some of them will also convert.
