= The Remnant (novel) =

Tenth book in the Left Behind series by Tim LaHaye and Jerry B. Jenkins

The Remnant: On the Brink of Armageddon
- The Paperback Cover
- Author: Tim LaHaye and Jerry B. Jenkins
- Cover artist: Julie Chen
- Language: English
- Series: Left Behind Series
- Genre: Christian novel Speculative Fiction; Post-apocalyptic fiction
- Publisher: Tyndale House Publishers
- Publication date: July 2002 (Hardback); February 2003 (Paperback)
- Publication place: United States
- Media type: Print (Hardback & Paperback) also Audiobook
- Pages: 432 pp (hardcover edition) & 432 p (paperback edition)
- ISBN: 0-8423-3227-8 (hardback edition); ISBN 0-8423-3230-8 (paperback edition)
- OCLC: 48951115
- Dewey Decimal: 813/.54 21
- LC Class: PS3562.A315 R46 2002
- Preceded by: Desecration
- Followed by: Armageddon

The Remnant: On the Brink of Armageddon is the tenth book in the Left Behind series written by Tim LaHaye and Jerry B. Jenkins and published in July 2002. It was on The New York Times Best Seller List for 19 weeks. It takes place from 43 months to 6 years into the Tribulation and a month to 2 1/2 years into the Great Tribulation.

== Plot ==
The Remnant begins immediately after the end of Desecration. The Great Tribulation unfolds, with one million believers gathered in Petra under the protection of God as Global Community Supreme Potentate and Antichrist Nicolae Carpathia continues to attack them and Armageddon approaches. Carpathia is ecstatic that he is about to attack the believers with massive amounts of conventional ordnance, a barrage that no one could survive without a miracle, yet all the believers do, not even feeling the flames that engulf their bodies. A final missile hits, opening a spring that drenches the fire. Afterwards, people talking to each other hear each other in their own language.

Chloe Steele Williams, Hannah Palemoon, and Mac McCullum all go to Greece disguised as GC officers to try to rescue George Sebastian. They gain information as to his whereabouts and begin searching that night. Meanwhile, Ming Toy leaves the safe house and under her new disguise (provided by Gustaf Zuckermandel, Jr. a.k.a. Z) attempts to return home to China to aid her parents. While on the way, she falls in love with a South Korean Pilot named Ree Woo (who later marries her). She discovers that both of her parents have become believers, but a strange man informs her that her father was killed. Chang Wong despairs for his safety and looks to escape New Babylon. After an arduous ordeal, George escapes his holders. He finds his way to the Co-op, where he meets up with the others and a miraculous escape is staged. Steve Plank refuses the Mark of the Beast and dies at the guillotine.

The new safe house is compromised, thanks in part to Chloe's venturing out in the previous book, and the Tribulation Force is forced to look for a new place. They manage to leave the now compromised safe house and the Chicago, Illinois, area just in time before Antichrist orders what remains of Chicago to be obliterated by a nuclear blast. The main Trib. Force members find a new safe house with George Sebastian in San Diego, California. Meanwhile, over the next two and a half years, the next two Bowl Judgments hit: the world's freshwater supply is turned into blood and the sun scorches with fiery heat. The three angels of Revelation 14 begin appearing all around the world, spreading their messages. Rayford moves back and forth between San Diego and Petra, while Tsion stays at Petra to teach the Jewish remnant there.

Antichrist sends scores of false messiahs and false teachers to deceive as many people as possible. Many people, including several at Petra, follow them only to meet horrible and gruesome deaths. The next Bowl Judgement hits, and a deep and painful darkness descends upon the throne and kingdom of the Antichrist in New Babylon. Chang plans to use the darkness to his advantage in order to finally escape. As the book ends, the final year of the Tribulation begins. God is leveling the playing field and setting the stage for Armageddon, the cosmic battle of the ages that will decide the fate of all that exists.

== Characters ==
- Rayford Steele
- Cameron "Buck" Williams
- Chloe Steele Williams
- Dr. Tsion Ben-Judah
- Mac McCullum
- His Excellency Global Community Potentate Nicolae Carpathia
- Most High Reverend of Carpathianism Leon Fortunato
- Dr. Chaim Rosenzweig aka: Micah
- Hattie Durham
- Leah Rose
- George Sebastian
- Kenny Bruce Williams
- Gustaf Zuckermandel Jr. (a.k.a. "Zeke" or "Z")
- Ming Toy
- Ree Woo
- Mr. and Mrs Wong
- Chang Wong
- Al B (aka: Albie)
- Abdullah Smith
- Viv Ivins
- Hannah Palemoon
- Steve Plank, a.k.a. Pinkerton Stephens, dies in this book
