= Jerry B. Jenkins =

American writer (born 1949)

- Born: Jerry Bruce Jenkins; September 23, 1949 (age 77); Kalamazoo, Michigan, United States
- Education: Moody Bible Institute (1967–68); Harper College (1968–70)
- Occupation: Writer
- Organizations: Christian Writers Guild (2001–2014); The Jerry Jenkins Writers Guild (2016–present)
- Spouse: Dianna Louise Whiteford (m. 1971)
- Children: 3, including Dallas
- Parents: Harry Philip Jenkins (father); Bonita Grace Thompson (mother)
- Writing career
- Partners: Robert G. Flood; Tim LaHaye; Sammy Tippit; Pat Williams; Chris Fabry
- Language: English
- Years active: 1973–present
- Genres: Biography; Christian eschatology; Biblical fiction; Contemporary Christian fiction
- Notable works: Left Behind series (1995–2007); Riven (2008)
- Website: jerryjenkins.com

Jerry Bruce Jenkins (born September 23, 1949) is an American writer. He is best known for the Left Behind series, written with Tim LaHaye. Jenkins also writes the novels following the TV series about Jesus, The Chosen. Jenkins has written more than 200 books, in multiple genres, such as biography, self-help, romance, mystery, and young adult fiction. Nineteen of his 130+ novels have explored eschatological themes and settings.

In 2016, Jenkins was described as a dispensationalist Christian by The Washington Post.

== Early life ==
Jenkins was born September 1949 to Harry Philip Jenkins and Bonita Grace Thompson of Kalamazoo, Michigan. In a 2008 interview with The Modesto Bee, Jenkins said his Christian faith was inspired by a Warner Sallman painting, guided by his mother. After graduating from Forest View High School, Jenkins attended Moody Bible Institute from 1967 to 1968, and Harper College from 1968 to 1970.

== Career ==
After suffering an injury playing sports, Jenkins began work as a sports reporter while he was still in high school. Before he could drive, Jenkins covered high school sports for local newspapers. He was paid US$1 (equivalent to $10.38 in 2025) per inch. While attending Moody Bible Institute, Jenkins served as night news editor for the institute's flagship radio station, WMBI-FM.

He served as Vice President of the Moody's publishing division from 1985 to 1988, and a writer-in-residence from 1988 onward. He was the managing editor of Moody Monthly from 1974 to 1979 and publisher from 1979 to 1981. Jenkins served as a member of Moody Bible Institute's Board of Trustees from 2001 to 2018.

Jenkins serves on Colorado Christian University's board of trustees. CCU's Armstrong Center, built in 2024, contains a reading room dedicated to Jenkins and his family.

=== As co-writer ===
Jenkins has written twenty as-told-to biographies and memoirs of prominent athletes and religious leaders, such as Hank Aaron, Bill Gaither, Walter Payton, Joe Gibbs, Mike Singletary, and Sammy Tippit. Jenkins called those titles his "sports personality" books. His credit as writer is given via an "as told to", "as told by", or "with Jerry B. Jenkins" attribution.

In an interview with Joanna Penn of The Creative Penn podcast, Jenkins explained he does not co-write, saying "if my name is on [the book] … I wrote every word." For works credited with Chris Fabry, such as The Wormlings (2007–08) series, Jenkins functioned as the editor, and Fabry was the sole writer. Jenkins said co-writing a book "is a nightmare," but can be successful if the roles among the credited writers are settled beforehand. His collaboration with Billy Graham resulted in In His Own Words (2018), published by Tyndale House, for which Jenkins received sole writing credit.

== Gil Thorp ==
The Dallas O'Neil and The Baker Street Sports Club (1986) series, and its follow up, the Dallas O'Neil Mysteries (1988–89), prompted Gil Thorp creator Jack Berrill to open discussions with Jenkins on creating a line of young adult books about Gil Thorp and the athletes at the fictional Milford High School. The Gil Thorp series was never realized, but following Berrill's death in 1996, Jenkins was recruited by Tribune to continue to comic strip as its writer, with Rod Whigham as artist. During his tenure as writer, Jenkins introduced a number of controversial storylines, including a young shomer Shabbat joining the Milford football team.

Jenkins's sons, Chad and Dallas, contributed to Gil Thorp by developing scenarios for their father to write. According to the Chicago Reader, Chad Jenkins wrote the strip from 2001 to 2004 without credit, which both Jenkins and his son say is not true. Chad served as a story consultant.

== Christian Writers Guild ==
In 1965, Norman Rohrer established the Christian Writers Guild (CWG). Rohrer offered a 48-part correspondence course intended to teach the craft of writing, as well as history and theology Rohrer believed were necessary to improve the quality of fiction and non-fiction writing intended for the Christian market. In 2001, Jenkins purchased the CWG, and Rohrer remained on staff as "Dean of Instruction". CWG transitioned from mail-based delivery, to an online platform. Jenkins recruited many of his friends and fellow writers to function as mentors to CWG members, and to expand the guild's offerings. In 2013, Jenkins developed the Christian Writers Guild Press intended to publish original works by CWG members. Jenkins was criticized for creating a "vanity press", despite lambasting such publishing schemes in the past and closed the operation before contracting with any writers.

According to literary agent Chip MacGregor, of MacGregor & Luedeke, Jenkins "was ready to return to his primary occupation and calling, that of full-time writing" by early-2014. Jenkins dissolved CWG in late-2014, which resulted in heavy criticism of both Jenkins and the CWG. Dennis E. Hensley told Christianity Today that Jenkins and the CWG had offered a "great service to developing writers." CWG's staff and mission were absorbed into a new organization called BelieversTrust, which operated until 2016.

Since 2016, Jenkins has taught an online writing course via his own platform, Jerry Jenkins Writers Guild.

== Left Behind ==
Jenkins and co-author LaHaye of the Left Behind series were profiled in a May 24, 2004 cover story in Newsweek magazine entitled "The New Prophets of Revelation". LaHaye, who conceived the series, handled the theological underpinnings of his end-of-the-world series, while Jenkins handled the writing. The Left Behind series includes 16 books which have sold over 63 million copies worldwide.

Jenkins has said, "I write the best I can. I know I'm never going to be revered as some classic writer. I don't claim to be C. S. Lewis. The literary-type writers, I admire them. I wish I was smart enough to write a book that's hard to read, you know?"

In 2018, Left Behind series was ranked No. 77 in The Great American Read poll sponsored by PBS.

== Personal life ==
Jenkins and his wife Dianna (née Whiteford), whom he married in 1971, reside in Black Forest, Colorado. He is the father of Dallas Jenkins, creator of The Chosen web television series; Chad Jenkins, the Sports Information Director at MidAmerica Nazarene University; and Michael Bruce Jenkins.

When asked about his Christian denomination, Jenkins has often answered "Jesus Christ". Alissa Wilkinson, of Christian Today, described Jenkins as a dispensationalist Christian in an editorial for The Washington Post.

== Works ==
=== Non-fiction ===
Title	Date	Publisher	ISBN	Notes
Sammy Tippit	1973	Moody	—	biography of Sammy Tippit
You CAN Get thru to Teens	1973	Victor Books	—	
VBS Unlimited	1974	Victor Books	—	
Bad Henry	1974	Chilton Company	—	biography of Hank Aaron; with Stanley C. Baldwin
The Story of the Christian Booksellers Association	1974	Thomas Nelson	—	
The Gingerbread Man	1974	Lippincott	0-87981-038-6	with Pat Williams
Light on the Heavy	July 1978	Victor	0-88207-769-4	
The Night the Giant Rolled Over	January 1981	Little Word	0-8499-0111-1	account of the 1976 Papua earthquake
The Power within You	May 1983	WJK	0-664-27008-5	with Pat Williams
The Men Behind Moody	November 1984	Moody	0-8024-5393-7	with Robert G. Flood
Teaching the Word, Reaching the World	February 1985	Moody	0-8024-8567-7	with Robert G. Flood
Rekindled	March 1985	Revell	0-8007-1417-2	with Pat Williams and Jill Williams
Keep the Fire Glowing	October 1986	Revell	0-8007-1498-9	with Pat Williams and Jill Williams
A Generous Impulse	October 1987	Moody	0-8024-2917-3	biography of George Sweeting
Kindling	October 1987	Thomas Nelson	0-8407-7606-3	with Pat Williams and Jill Williams
Hymns for Personal Devotions	July 1989	Moody	0-8024-3836-9	
Hedges	November 1989	Wolgemuth & Hyatt	0-943497-40-X	
Lessons Learned Early	April 1990	Moody	0-8024-4687-6	autobiography
Twelve Things I Want My Kids to Remember Forever	March 1991	Moody	0-8024-8756-4	
Just Between Us	October 1991	Revell	0-8007-1663-9	with Pat Williams and Jill Williams
Life Flies When You're Having Fun	April 1993	David C. Cook	1-56476-126-6	autobiography
Verbal Judo	June 1993	Morrow	0-688-12263-9	with George J. Thompson
Families	July 1993	Moody	0-8024-2595-X	as editor
Addicted to Recovery	June 1994	Harvest House	1-56507-185-9	with Gary Almy and Carol T. Almy
Winning at Losing	July 1995	Moody	0-8024-1737-X	
Homecoming	September 1997	Zondervan	0-310-21325-8	with Bill Gaither
Still the One	April 1998	Focus on the Family	1-56179-339-6	
And Then Came You	April 1998	Focus on the Family	1-56179-471-6	
As you Leave Home	August 1998	Focus on the Family	1-56179-132-6	
Perhaps Today	October 2001	Tyndale House (Note: Tyndale House publications are released on various dates to Christian bookstores and ministries, religious events, libraries, and to specialty booksellers. Dates are those attributed to Tyndale House by Books in Print.)	0-8423-3601-X	with Tim LaHaye
The Promise of Heaven	February 2003	Harvest House	0-7369-1085-9	with Tim LaHaye
God Always Keeps His Promises	September 2003	Harvest House	0-7369-1243-6	with Tim LaHaye
Jesus and the Hope of His Coming	January 2004	Harvest House	0-7369-1244-4	with Tim LaHaye
Embracing Eternity	November 2004	Tyndale House	0-8423-7122-2	with Tim LaHaye and Frank M. Martin
Writing for the Soul	July 18, 2006	F&W Media	1-58297-417-9	
In His Own Words	September 18, 2018	Tyndale House	978-1-4964-3643-6	with Billy Graham

=== Co-written works ===
Jenkins wrote the following memoirs and autobiographical works in which he received an "as told by" or "with Jerry B. Jenkins" attribution.

Title	Author(s)	Date	Publisher	ISBN
The World's Strongest Man (Note: Expanded edition published in 1990 as A Greater Strength, Revell.)	Paul Anderson	1975	Moody	—
Stuff It	Dick Motta	1975	Chilton Company	0-8019-5967-5
Three Behind the Curtain	Sammy Tippit	1975	Whitaker House	0-88368-068-8
Running for Jesus	Madeline Manning Jackson	1977	Word	0-87680-460-1
You, Me, He	Sammy Tippit	1978	Victor Books	0-88207-766-X
Home Where I Belong	B. J. Thomas	1978	W Publishing Group	—
Sweetness	Walter Payton	1978	Contemporary Books	0-8092-7544-9
Reproduced by Permission of the Author	Sammy Tippit	1979	Victor Books	0-88207-579-9
The Luis Palau Story	Luis Palau	November 1980	Fleming H. Revell	0-8007-1134-3
Meadowlark	Meadowlark Lemon	April 1987	Thomas Nelson	0-8407-4220-7
Carry Me	Christine Wyrtzen	August 1988	Moody	0-8024-2836-3
Commitment to Love	Deanna McClary	April 1989	Thomas Nelson	0-8407-7632-2
Out of the Blue	Orel Hershiser	August 1989	Wolgemuth & Hyatt	0-943497-57-4
Baby Mayfield	Larry Mayfield and Diane Mayfield	November 1989	Moody	0-8024-1116-9
Joe Gibbs: Fourth and One	Joe Gibbs	January 1991	Thomas Nelson	0-8407-7660-8
Singletary on Singletary	Mike Singletary	September 1991	Thomas Nelson	0-8407-7654-3
I Almost Missed the Sunset	Bill Gaither	August 1992	Thomas Nelson	0-8407-7573-3
No Matter What the Cost	Sammy Tippit	September 1992	Thomas Nelson	0-8407-7583-0
Miracle Man	Nolan Ryan	April 1993	Thomas Nelson	0-8499-3507-5
Field of Hope	Brett Butler	July 1997	Thomas Nelson	0-7852-7144-9
God's Secret Agent	Sammy Tippit	June 2001	Tyndale House	0-8423-5248-1
Game Plan for Life	Joe Gibbs	July 2009	Tyndale House	978-1-4143-2979-6
As Good as She Imagined	Roxanna Green	January 3, 2012	Worthy	978-1-61795-012-4
The Matheny Manifesto	Mike Matheny	February 3, 2015	Crown	978-0-553-44669-2

=== Fiction ===
Title	Date	Publisher	ISBN	Notes
The Operative	September 1987	Harper & Row	0-06-250410-X	
Rookie	March 1991	Wolgemuth & Hyatt	1-56121-039-0	
The Deacon's Woman and Other Portraits	February 1992	Moody	0-8024-1738-8	
Though None Go with Me	September 1999	Zondervan	0-310-21948-5	
'Twas the Night Before	October 1998	Viking Press	0-670-88176-7	
Hometown Legend	September 2001	Warner Faith	0-446-52902-8	
Holding Heaven	November 1, 2005	Integrity	1-59145-218-X	novella
Midnight Clear	October 2007	Tyndale House	978-1-4143-1659-8	with Dallas Jenkins
Riven	July 22, 2008	Tyndale House	978-1-4143-0904-0	
The Last Operative	July 1, 2010	Tyndale House	978-1-4143-0905-7	
Sudden Impact	March 5, 2013	Zondervan	978-0-310-73311-9	
I, Saul	August 27, 2013	Worthy	978-1-61795-006-3	with James MacDonald
Empire's End	June 9, 2015	Worthy	978-1-61795-007-0	
The Valley of the Dry Bones	May 31, 2016	Worthy	978-1-61795-008-7	

==== Margo Mystery (1979–1984) ====
A Margo Mystery series was published by Moody. The first novel, Margo (1979), was published by Jeremy Books, but later reprinted by Moody.

No.	Title	Date	Publisher	ISBN
1	Margo	January 1979	Jeremy Books (Note: Reprinted by Moody Publishers in 1980.)	0-89877-001-7
2	Karlyn	September 1980	Moody	0-8024-4312-5
3	Hilary	September 1980	Moody	0-8024-4313-3
4	Paige	May 1981	Moody	0-8024-4314-1
5	Allyson	August 1981	Moody	0-8024-4315-X
6	Erin	April 1982	Moody	0-8024-4316-8
7	Shannon	September 1982	Moody	0-8024-4317-6
8	Lindsey	February 1983	Moody	0-8024-4318-4
9	Meghan	February 1983	Moody	0-8024-4321-4
10	Janell	June 1983	Moody	0-8024-4322-2
11	Courtney	October 1983	Moody	0-8024-4323-0
12	Lyssa	January 1984	Moody	0-8024-4327-3
13	Margo's Reunion	September 1984	Moody	0-8024-4328-1

==== Jennifer Grey Mystery (1983–1985) ====
A Jennifer Grey Mystery series was published by Victor Books.

No.	Title	Date	ISBN
1	Heartbeat	January 1983	0-88207-287-0
2	Three Days in Winter	January 1983	0-88207-288-9
3	Too Late to Tell	January 1984	0-88207-615-9
4	Gateway	January 1984	0-88207-614-0
5	The Calling	January 1984	0-89693-392-X
6	Veiled Threat	January 1985	0-89693-331-8

==== The Soon Trilogy (2003–2005) ====
The Soon Trilogy was published by Tyndale House.

No.	Title	Date	ISBN
1	Soon	September 2003	0-8423-8406-5
2	Silenced	July 2004	0-8423-8410-3
3	Shadowed	September 2005	0-8423-8414-6

==== Jesus Chronicles (2007–2010) ====
The Jesus Chronicles series, written with Tim LaHaye, is a narrative retelling of the four canonical gospels. Published by Penguin's Putnam Adult imprint. Reprints from Center Point assigned numbers to the novels.

No.	Title	Date	ISBN
1	John's Story	November 21, 2006	0-399-15389-6
2	Mark's Story	October 9, 2007	978-0-399-15447-8
3	Luke's Story	February 19, 2009	978-0-399-15523-9
4	Matthew's Story	February 18, 2010	978-0-399-15621-2

==== Precinct 11 (2011–2012) ====
The Precinct 11 novels were published by Tyndale House.

No.	Title	Date	ISBN
1	The Brotherhood	January 25, 2011	978-1-4143-0907-1
2	The Betrayal	August 16, 2011	978-1-4143-0908-8
3	The Breakthrough	August 28, 2012	978-1-4143-0909-5

==== Dead Sea Chronicles (2018–2020) ====
The Dead Sea Chronicles series is based on and inspired by the work of Craig A. Evans. Published by Worthy.

No.	Title	Date	ISBN
1	Dead Sea Rising	November 13, 2018	978-1-61795-009-4
2	Dead Sea Conspiracy	November 10, 2020	978-1-5460-1422-5

=== Young adult fiction ===
Below is an incomplete list:

Title	Date	Publisher	ISBN
The Youngest Hero	April 3, 2002	Warner Faith	0-446-52903-6

==== Tara Chadwick (1984) ====
The Tara Chadwick Series was published by Moody in 1984. Reprinted in 1992, including new cover art and formatting.

No.	Title	Date	ISBN (Note: ISBN taken from reprints published in 1992.)
1	Springtime Discovery	June 1984	0-8024-8542-1
2	Time to Tell	June 1984	0-8024-8543-X
3	Operation Cemetery	June 1984	0-8024-8544-8
4	Scattered Flowers	June 1984	0-8024-8545-6

==== Bradford Family (1984–1986) ====
The Bradford Family Adventures series was originally published by Stanford Publishing, in 1984. Reprinted by Moody in 1990.

No.	Title	Date	ISBN
1	Daniel's Big Surprise	July 1984	0-87239-791-2
2	Two Runaways	July 1984	0-87239-792-0
3	The Clubhouse Mystery	July 1984	0-87239-793-9
4	The Kidnapping	July 1984	0-87239-794-7
5	Marty's Secret	July 1985	0-87239-941-9
6	Blizzard!	July 1985	0-87239-942-7
7	Fourteen Days to Midnight	July 1985	0-87239-943-5
8	Good Sport, Bad Sport	July 1985	0-87239-944-3
9	In Deep Water	July 1986	0-87403-091-9
10	Mystery at Raider Stadium	July 1986	0-87403-092-7
11	Daniel's Big Decision	July 1986	0-87403-093-5
12	Before the Judge	July 1986	0-87403-094-3

==== Dallas O'Neil (1986) ====
The Dallas O'Neil and the Baker Street Sports Club series was published by Moody in 1986.

No.	Title	Date	ISBN
1	The Secret Baseball Challenge	March 1986	0-8024-8232-5
2	The Scary Baseball Player	March 1986	0-8024-8233-3
3	The Mysterious Football Team	March 1986	0-8024-8234-1
4	The Weird Soccer Match	March 1986	0-8024-8237-6
5	The Strange Swimming Coach	September 1986	0-8024-8238-4
6	The Bizarre Hockey Tournament	September 1986	0-8024-8236-8
7	The Silent Track Star	September 1986	0-8024-8239-2
8	The Angry Gymnast	September 1986	0-8024-8235-X

==== Dallas O'Neil Mysteries (1988–1989) ====
The Dallas O'Neil Mysteries series is a sequel to the Dallas O'Neil and the Baker Street Sports Club (1986) series. Also published by Moody.

No.	Title	Date	ISBN
1	Mystery of the Kidnapped Kid	October 1988	0-8024-8376-3
2	Mystery of the Mixed-Up Teacher	October 1988	0-8024-8377-1
3	Mystery of the Missing Sister	October 1988	0-8024-8378-X
4	Mystery of the Scorpion Threat	October 1988	0-8024-8379-8
5	Mystery on the Midway	September 1989	0-8024-8385-2
6	Mystery of the Golden Palomino	September 1989	0-8024-8386-0
7	Mystery of the Skinny Sophomore	September 1989	0-8024-8387-9
8	Mystery of the Phony Murder	September 1989	0-8024-8388-7

==== Toby Andrews (1996) ====
The Toby Andrews and the Junior Deputies series was published by Moody.

No.	Title	Date	ISBN
1	House of Tunnels	July 1996	0-8024-1625-X
2	Man with a Terrible Secret	July 1996	0-8024-1626-8
3	The East Side Bullies	October 1996	0-8024-1627-6
4	The Neighborhood's Scariest Woman	October 1996	0-8024-1628-4

==== Global Air Troubleshooters (1996) ====
The Global Air Troubleshooters series was published by Multnomah Books in 1996. Reprinted as AirQuest Adventures by Zondervan in 2006.

No.	Title	Date	ISBN
1	Crash at Cannibal Valley	September 1996	0-88070-970-7
2	Terror in Branco Grande	September 1996	0-88070-971-5
3	Disaster in the Yukon	September 1996	0-88070-972-3

==== Red Rock Mysteries (2005–2006) ====
The Red Rock Mysteries series was written by Chris Fabry and edited by Jenkins. Published by Tyndale House. The series was reprinted in 2020, including new cover art and new text.

No.	Title	Date	ISBN
1	Haunted Waters	May 2005	1-4143-0140-5
2	Stolen Secrets	May 2005	1-4143-0141-3
3	Missing Pieces	May 2005	1-4143-0142-1
4	Wild Rescue	May 2005	1-4143-0143-X
5	Grave Shadows	September 2005	1-4143-0144-8
6	Phantom Writer	September 2005	1-4143-0145-6
7	Double Fault	September 2005	1-4143-0146-4
8	Canyon Echoes	September 2005	1-4143-0147-2
9	Instant Menace	March 2006	1-4143-0148-0
10	Escaping Darkness	March 2006	1-4143-0149-9
11	Windy City Danger	March 2006	1-4143-0150-2
12	Hollywood Holdup	March 2006	1-4143-0151-0
13	Hidden Riches	September 2006	1-4143-0152-9
14	Wind Chill	September 2006	1-4143-0153-7
15	Dead End	September 2006	1-4143-0154-5

==== Renegade Spirit (2006–2008) ====
The Renegade Spirit series was written by John Perrodin and edited by Jenkins. Published by Thomas Nelson's Integrity imprint. The premise is similar to The Soon Trilogy (2003–2005), written by Jenkins.

No.	Titles	Date	ISBN
1	The Tattooed Rats	October 3, 2006	1-59145-396-8
2	Demon's Bluff	April 10, 2007	978-1-59145-397-0
3	Seclusion Point	February 5, 2008	978-1-59554-401-8

==== The Wormlings (2007–2008) ====
The Wormlings series was written by Chris Fabry and edited by Jenkins. Published by Tyndale House.

No.	Title	Date	ISBN
1	The Book of the King	October 2007	978-1-4143-0155-6
2	The Sword of the Wormling	October 2007	978-1-4143-0156-3
3	The Changeling	October 2007	978-1-4143-0157-0
4	The Minions of Time	February 2008	978-1-4143-0158-7
5	The Author's Blood	February 2008	978-1-4143-0159-4

==== Thirteen (2016–2017) ====
The Thirteen science fantasy series was written by Trisha White Priebe and edited by Jenkins. Published by Barbour.

No.	Title	Date	ISBN
1	The Glass Castle	March 2016	978-1-63409-389-7
2	The Ruby Moon	October 2016	978-1-63409-903-5
3	The Paper Boat	April 2017	978-1-68322-178-4

=== Left Behind (1995–2007) ===
The Left Behind series, created and developed by Tim LaHaye, was published by Tyndale House. Thorndike Press, Turtleback Books, and others, offered reprints in various formats. Graphic novel adaptations of the series were published by Tyndale from 2001 to 2002. Tyndale also published devotional calendars for 2002 and 2003 which featured text from the novels. Prior to the release of Soul Harvest (1998), the novels were not numbered. Not all printings include a number stamp.

No.	Title	Date	ISBN
1	Left Behind	September 1995	0-8423-2911-0
2	Tribulation Force	September 1996	0-8423-2913-7
3	Nicolae	July 1997	0-8423-2914-5
4	Soul Harvest	June 1998	0-8423-2915-3
5	Apollyon	February 1999	0-8423-2916-1
6	Assassins	August 1999	0-8423-2920-X
7	The Indwelling	May 2000	0-8423-2928-5
8	The Mark	November 2000	0-8423-3225-1
9	Desecration	November 2001	0-8423-3226-X
10	The Remnant	May 2002	0-8423-3227-8
11	Armageddon	April 2003	0-8423-3234-0
12	Glorious Appearing	March 2004	0-8423-3235-9
13	Kingdom Come	April 2007	978-0-8423-6061-6

==== Prequel series (2005–2006) ====
Marketed as Before They Were Left Behind, the series retells events prior Left Behind (1995). The novels also function as prequels to Kingdom Come (2007), the final installment of the main series.

No.	Title	Date	ISBN
1	The Rising	February 2005	0-8423-6056-5
2	The Regime	October 2005	1-4143-0576-1
3	The Rapture	June 2006	1-4143-0580-X

==== Kids (1998–2003) ====
Left Behind: The Kids is a retelling of the main series from the point of view of four young survivors. The novellas were bound-up as the Young Trib Force (2003–2005) series. Reprints include updated text introduced in the Young Trib Force bind-ups.

No.	Title	Date	ISBN
1	The Vanishings	July 1998	0-8423-2193-4
2	Second Chance	July 1998	0-8423-2194-2
3	Through the Flames	July 1998	0-8423-2195-0
4	Facing the Future	July 1998	0-8423-2196-9
5	Nicolae High	September 1999	0-8423-4325-3
6	The Underground ‡	September 1999	0-8423-4326-1
7	Busted! ‡	March 2000	0-8423-4327-X
8	Death Strike ‡	March 2000	0-8423-4328-8
9	The Search ‡	July 2000	0-8423-4329-6
10	On the Run	July 2000	0-8423-4330-X
11	Into the Storm ‡	November 2000	0-8423-4331-8
12	Earthquake! ‡	November 2000	0-8423-4332-6
13	The Showdown ‡	February 2001	0-8423-4294-X
14	Judgment Day ‡	February 2001	0-8423-4295-8
15	Battling the Commander ‡	June 2001	0-8423-4296-6
16	Fire from Heaven ‡	June 2001	0-8423-4297-4
17	Terror in the Stadium ‡	October 2001	0-8423-4299-0
18	Darkening Skies ‡	October 2001	0-8423-4312-1
19	Attack of Apollyon	March 2002	0-8423-4313-X
20	A Dangerous Plan ‡	March 2002	0-8423-4314-8
21	Secrets of New Babylon	July 2002	0-8423-4315-6
22	Escape from New Babylon ‡	July 2002	0-8423-4316-4
23	Horsemen of Terror ‡	October 2002	0-8423-4317-2
24	Uplink from the Underground ‡	October 2002	0-8423-4318-0
25	Death at the Gala ‡	March 2003	0-8423-5789-0
26	The Beast Arises ‡	March 2003	0-8423-5790-4
27	Wildfire! ‡	May 2003	0-8423-5791-2
28	The Mark of the Beast ‡	May 2003	0-8423-5792-0
29	Breakout!	June 2003	0-8423-5793-9
30	Murder in the Holy Place ‡	June 2003	0-8423-5794-7
31	Escape to Masada ‡	September 2003	0-8423-5801-3
32	War of the Dragon ‡	September 2003	0-8423-5802-1
33	Attack on Petra ‡	January 2004	0-8423-5803-X
34	Bounty Hunters ‡	January 2004	0-8423-5804-8
35	The Rise of False Messiahs	May 2004	0-8423-5805-6
36	Ominous Choices ‡	May 2004	0-8423-5807-2
37	Heat Wave ‡	August 2004	0-8423-8347-6
38	The Perils of Love ‡	August 2004	0-8423-8348-4
39	The Road to War ‡	September 2004	0-8423-8349-2
40	Triumphant Return ‡	September 2004	0-8423-8350-6

‡ Includes previously uncredited contributions from Chris Fabry.

==== Non-fiction companions (1999–2005) ====
Jenkins co-wrote three companions with Tim LaHaye. Are We Living in the End Times? (1999) was not marketed as a Left Behind title; however, the book explored themes and settings depicted in the novels. These Will Not Be Left Behind (2003) is a retrospective of reader's experiences with the series, and how they "came to faith." Reprints of the companions use the same cover design and typeface as the main series.

Title	Date	ISBN	Notes
Are We Living in the End Times?	October 1999	0-8423-0098-8	
These Will Not Be Left Behind	July 2003	0-8423-6593-1	with Norman B. Rohrer
The Authorized Left Behind Handbook	February 2005	0-8423-5440-9	with Sandi L. Swanson

==== Young Trib Force (2003–2005) ====
Left Behind: The Young Trib Force bind-ups of The Kids (1998–2003) series, three or four novellas per volume. Chris Fabry wrote new material to link the novellas to the main sequence of novels. Several bind-ups included significant revisions to the original text, including reordering of events and character changes.

No.	Title	Date	ISBN
1	Taken	October 2003	0-8423-8351-4
2	Pursued	October 2003	0-8423-8352-2
3	Hidden	January 2004	0-8423-8353-0
4	Rescued	February 2004	0-8423-8354-9
5	Stung	July 2004	0-8423-8355-7
6	Frantic	July 2004	0-8423-8356-5
7	Shaken	February 2005	1-4143-0268-1
8	Unmasked	February 2005	1-4143-0269-X
9	Deceived	April 2005	1-4143-0270-3
10	Protected	April 2005	1-4143-0271-1
11	Hunted	May 2005	1-4143-0272-X
12	Arrived	May 2005	1-4143-0273-8
